= Monkey Island (disambiguation) =

Monkey Island is a series of adventure games.

Monkey Island may also refer to:

== Places ==
- Nanwan Monkey Island, a nature reserve in Hainan, China
- Sarushima or Monkey Island, Japan
- Angaur or Monkey Island, Palau
- Monkey Island, Bray, in the River Thames
- Monkey Island (Denver), Colorado, United States
- Morgan Island, South Carolina or Monkey Island
- Monkey Island, North Carolina, a remote, natural island in Currituck Sound, North Carolina
- Monkey Island, Oklahoma, a peninsula in the Grand Lake o' the Cherokees in northeast Oklahoma
- Monkey Island, Liberia, a group of uninhabited mangrove islands in the Farmington and Little Bassa rivers in Liberia
- Cayo Santiago or Island of the Monkeys, Puerto Rico
- Monkey Island, a monkey habitat on an island in the Homosassa River in Florida

== Zoo enclosures ==
- Monkey Island, an area that used to be in the Cleveland Metroparks Zoo
- Monkey Island, an area that used to be in the San Francisco Zoo
- Monkey Island, an area that was at the entrance of the Oklahoma City Zoo and Botanical Gardens from 1935 to 1998

== Other uses ==
- Monkey Island (album), a 1977 album by the J. Geils Band
- Monkey Island (book), a 1991 book about homelessness
- "Monkey Island", a 1966 song by the 13th Floor Elevators from The Psychedelic Sounds of the 13th Floor Elevators
- Monkey island, the flying bridge or open area on top of a surface ship
