= Desperate Characters =

Desperate Characters may refer to:

- Desperate Characters (novel), a 1970 novel by Paula Fox
- Desperate Characters (film), a 1971 American drama film, based on the novel
