= Craighead =

Craighead may refer to:

Surname

- Alexander Craighead (1705–1766), Scots-Irish American preacher
- Alison Craighead (born 1971), London-based visual artist
- Brander Craighead (born 1990), Canadian football player
- David Craighead (organist) (1924–2012), American organist
- David Hope, Baron Hope of Craighead, KT FRSE PC (born 1938), former first Deputy President of the Supreme Court of the United Kingdom
- Frank C. Craighead Sr. (1890–1982) American entomologist
- Frank and John Craighead (born 1916), twin American naturalists and conservationists
- Harold Craighead, American professor of applied and engineering physics at Cornell University in Ithaca, New York
- Jane Elizabeth Sophia Engelhard Craighead, wife of Charles W. Engelhard, Jr., American businessman
- John Craighead (born 1971), retired professional ice hockey right winger
- Lura Harris Craighead (1858-1926), American civic and patriotic worker, author, parliamentarian, clubwoman
- Thomas Craighead (politician) (1798–1862), American politician and lawyer from the state of Arkansas
- Thomas B. Craighead (minister), American Presbyterian minister and educator

Locations

- Craighead Caverns, extensive cave system located in Sweetwater, Tennessee
- Craighead County, Arkansas, county located in the U.S. state of Arkansas
- Craighead-Jackson House, historic two-story, brick house in Knoxville, in the U.S. state of Tennessee

Maritime

- USS Craighead (AK-175), Alamosa-class cargo ship commissioned by the U.S. Navy for service in World War II

== See also ==
- Craghead

Media related to Craighead at Wikimedia Commons
