= Languages of the Congo =

Languages of the Congo may refer to:

- Languages of the Democratic Republic of the Congo
- Languages of the Republic of the Congo
