= Paul Hervey Fox =

American playwright, novelist and screenwriter (1894–1956)

- Born: March 13, 1894; New York City, U.S.
- Died: November 1, 1956 (aged 62); Swarthmore, Pennsylvania, U.S.
- Occupations: Screenwriter; novelist; playwright
- Spouses: Elsie de Sola (m. 1923; divorced); Mary Fox
- Children: 4, including Paula Fox
- Relatives: Linda Carroll (granddaughter); Courtney Love (great-granddaughter); Douglas Fairbanks (cousin); Faith Baldwin (cousin); Frances Bean Cobain (great-great-granddaughter)

Paul Hervey Fox (March 13, 1894 – November 1, 1956) was an American playwright, novelist, and screenwriter. He wrote several films during the pre-Code era and Hollywood golden age, including Mandalay (1934), Grand Finale (1936), The Last Train from Madrid (1937), Safari (1940), A Gentleman at Heart (1942), and The Stars Are Singing (1953). He also published several novels and short stories, and wrote five Broadway plays.

Fox was the father of author Paula Fox, whose mother was Cuban writer Elsie Fox (née de Sola). He is the biological grandfather of Linda Carroll, and great-grandfather of her daughter, rock musician Courtney Love.

== Early life ==
Fox was born in New York City in 1894 to Winfield Douglas Fox and Mary Finch. Fox's paternal great-grandmother, Jane, immigrated to the United States from her native Nova Scotia, Canada. He was the cousin of writer Faith Baldwin and actor Douglas Fairbanks. Fox was raised in Yonkers, New York, and was "thrown out of three [different] colleges."

== Career ==
At age nineteen, Fox sold his first story to The Smart Set, a New York-based literary magazine.

Fox's play Odd Man Out premiered on Broadway in 1925. Between then and 1938, four more of his plays were performed in Broadway theaters, though he later joked: "My plays dimmed more Broadway stars and killed more good performers than there are in the Actors Home."

In 1928, Fox wrote the short story The Strange Case of Dr. Fell, which was published in a serialized form in Ghost Stories in four parts. Fox's play Soldiers and Women, which was staged on Broadway and ran for just under one year, led to him receiving a screenwriting job offer in California. He accepted the position, and relocated with wife Elsie to Los Angeles, where he quickly developed a drinking problem. Soldiers and Women was adapted into a feature film of the same name in 1930.

Fox's 1929 story Housebroken was adapted into a film of the same name in 1936. Fox wrote the story of the 1937 film The Last Train from Madrid with his then-wife, Elsie. Fox later told his daughter, Paula, that he had written the film "in a week, while Elsie... handed him Benzedrine tablets from the bed upon which she lay, doing crossword puzzles and lighting cigarette after cigarette." Fox was paid $10,000 for the story. Upon release, the film was lambasted by writer Graham Greene, who publicly deemed it "the worst movie I ever saw."

In 1935, Fox published the novel Sailor Town, which earned high praise, and was deemed by one unnamed English critic as "one of the best six novels to appear in the English language" that year. This was followed by The Antagonists, which followed a self-indulgent mathematics professor. In reviewing The Antagonists, critic E. E. Hollis of The Salt Lake Tribune noted Fox as a "distinctive talent" and praised the work.

In 1946, Fox published his third novel, Four Men. By this time, Fox had become disillusioned by his writing career in Hollywood, and left Los Angeles to return to the east coast.

== Personal life and death ==
Fox married Cuban writer Elsie de Sola in 1923, and they had a daughter, Paula Fox, born the same year. Fox and Elsie left Paula at a foundling hospital, but Elsie's mother reclaimed her shortly thereafter. Paula was raised by various relatives, friends, and paid caregivers, and grew up to become a writer. In 1944, Paula gave birth to a daughter, Linda Carroll, whom she gave up for adoption. Carroll became a therapist and the mother of musician Courtney Love (b. 1964).

After divorcing Elsie, Fox later remarried Mary Parke, twenty years his junior, with whom he had four other children.

Fox was an alcoholic.

Fox died in Swarthmore, Pennsylvania on November 1, 1956, aged 62.

== Filmography ==
Year	Title	Notes	Ref.
1930	Prince of Diamonds	Adaptation, additional dialogue	
1930	Soldiers and Women	Based on his play, originally titled The Soul Kiss	
1930	Ladies Must Play	Story	
1931	The Cuban Love Song	Additional dialogue	
1934	Mandalay	Story	
1936	House Broken	Story	
1936	Hideout in the Alps	Additional dialogue	
1936	Grand Finale	Story	
1937	The Last Train from Madrid	Story	
1938	Romance à la carte	Story	
1940	Safari	Story	
1942	A Gentleman at Heart	From his story Masterpiece	
1953	The Stars Are Singing	Story	

== Bibliography ==
Novels

- Sailor Town (1935, Henry Holt Publishing)
- The Antagonists (1937, Henry Holt Publishing)
- Four Men (1946, Charles Scribner's Sons)
- The Daughter of Jairus (1951, Little, Brown)

Plays

- Odd Man Out (1925; Broadway)
- Soldiers and Women (1929; Broadway)
- The Great Man (1931; Broadway)
- Foreign Affairs (1932; Broadway)
- If I Were You (1938; Broadway)

Short stories

- The Strange Case of Doctor Fell (1928, serialized in Ghost Stories)

== Sources ==
- Fox, Paula (2011). News from the World: Stories and Essays. New York City, New York: W. W. Norton & Company. ISBN 978-0-393-08219-7.
- Kear, Lynn; King, James (2009). Evelyn Brent: The Life and Films of Hollywood's Lady Crook. Jefferson, North Carolina: McFarland. ISBN 978-0-786-45468-6.
- Lahire, Bernard, ed. (2011). Ce qu'ils vivent, ce qu'ils écrivent: mises en scène littéraires du social et expériences socialisatrices des écrivains (in French). Paris, France: Archives contemporaines. ISBN 978-2-813-00050-7.
