= Frances Bean Cobain =

American visual artist (born 1992)

- Born: August 18, 1992 (age 34); Los Angeles, California, U.S.
- Other names: thespacewitch; Fiddle Tim
- Occupations: Visual artist; model
- Spouses: Isaiah Silva (m. 2014; div. 2017); Riley Hawk (m. 2023)
- Children: 1
- Parents: Kurt Cobain (father); Courtney Love (mother)
- Relatives: Linda Carroll (grandmother); Paula Fox (great-grandmother); Paul Hervey Fox (great-great-grandfather); Tony Hawk (father-in-law); Gupi (sibling-in-law)

Frances Bean Cobain (born August 18, 1992) is an American visual artist and model. She is the only child of Nirvana frontman Kurt Cobain and Hole frontwoman Courtney Love. She controls the publicity rights to her father's name and image.

== Early life ==
Frances Bean Cobain was born on August 18, 1992, at Cedars-Sinai Medical Center in Los Angeles, California to Kurt Cobain and Courtney Love. She was named after Frances McKee, the guitarist for the Scottish indie pop duo The Vaselines, not actress Frances Farmer, as has been commonly assumed. Former R.E.M. frontman Michael Stipe and actress Drew Barrymore are her godparents.

Cobain's sonogram photo – the origin of her middle name, as her father thought she looked like a kidney bean – was featured on the sleeve of Nirvana's 1992 single "Lithium".

Before Cobain's birth, rumors suggested that her mother used heroin during the pregnancy. This scandal intensified when Vanity Fair published Lynn Hirschberg's article "Strange Love", which alleged that Love admitted to using heroin even after learning of her pregnancy. Love and Kurt Cobain maintained that Vanity Fair took her words out of context. Eventually, child welfare services launched an investigation into their parenting abilities. The investigation was ultimately dismissed, but not without a significant amount of legal wrangling and Cobain being removed from her parents' custody for a short time, beginning when she was just two weeks old.

On April 1, 1994, when she was nearly 2 years old, Cobain visited her father at the Exodus Recovery Center, a rehab center in Marina del Rey, California, where they played together. This was the last time she saw her father alive; a week later, he was found dead at his home in Seattle. Cobain was subsequently raised by her mother, aunts, and paternal grandmother. She spent her early years in Seattle and Los Angeles, and was placed in her grandmother's care for a time after her mother's drug-related arrest in October 2003. Love regained custody of Cobain in 2005. Cobain is a childhood neighbor and close friend of Billie Lourd, daughter of Carrie Fisher and Bryan Lourd.

During her young adulthood, Cobain attended Bard College, where she studied art.

== Career ==
=== Modeling ===
In August 2006, she was photographed for Elle UK magazine in her father's famous brown cardigan and pajama pants as part of an article featuring children of rock stars in their parents' clothing. She explained, "I wore his pajamas because he got married in them to my mom in 1992 in Hawaii so I thought they would be cute if I wore them today. He was too lazy to put on a tux so he got married in pajamas!" In February 2008, she appeared in a photo spread for Harper's Bazaar dressed as Evita. Cobain modeled for Hedi Slimane for a web photo series released August 2, 2011. In 2016, she modeled alongside Alice Glass in a spread for Schön! magazine shot by Floria Sigismondi. In 2017, she was announced as the face of Marc Jacobs's Spring/Summer campaign for that year, shot by David Sims.

=== Artwork ===
In July 2010, Cobain debuted a collection of artwork titled Scumfuck under the pseudonym "Fiddle Tim" at the La Luz de Jesus Gallery in Los Angeles. On August 4, 2012, she participated in the group show 'MiXTAPE' under her real name. Artists were asked to pick a song and create art inspired by that song. Cobain chose the song "Black" by The Jesus and Mary Chain. The eclectic mix of songs chosen was featured for digital download on iTunes. Opening on June 7, 2017, through June 30, Cobain and artist Lindsey Way held a joint art exhibition titled "Ghosts For Sale" at Gallery 30 South in Pasadena.

=== Other ventures ===
According to Rolling Stone magazine, the title and cover photograph for the 2005 Nirvana rarities album Sliver: The Best of the Box were chosen by 13-year-old Cobain. Cobain worked as an intern for Rolling Stone magazine from June to August 2008. She was featured in the magazine years later, photographed by David LaChapelle. In 2009, it was reported that Cobain had turned down the role of Alice in Tim Burton's film Alice in Wonderland, while in 2013 it was revealed she had turned down the part of Bella Swan in Twilight.

Cobain appeared as a guest vocalist on the song "My Space" from the album Evelyn Evelyn by Evelyn Evelyn, which was released on March 30, 2010. Amanda Palmer from Evelyn clarified that Cobain was one of some 20 artists who sang the same line and whose voices were mixed together in the recording. Cobain was also an executive producer on the HBO movie about her father's life, Kurt Cobain: Montage of Heck, though she later denounced the film, calling the representation of her father "not what I wanted it to be". In 2019, she appeared as a special guest judge in one episode of RuPaul's Drag Race All Stars season 4.

== Personal life ==
On December 11, 2009, a California Superior Court in Los Angeles appointed Wendy O'Connor, her paternal grandmother, and Kimberly Cobain, her father's sister, Cobain's temporary co-guardians. On December 16, 2009, a judge issued a related temporary restraining order prohibiting Love from having any direct or indirect contact with her daughter. The papers were filed under the heading "motion to seal all documents... relating to a minor and allegations of domestic violence". Among those documents are Cobain's medical records, according to the filing.

On August 18, 2010, Cobain inherited 37% of her late father's estate. She controls the publicity rights to her father's name and image.

Cobain was ill on April 10, 2014, and therefore could not attend the Rock and Roll Hall of Fame Induction Ceremony for her father's band, Nirvana. Several of her family members spoke on stage at the event. Her godfather, Michael Stipe, gave the band's induction speech.

In an interview in 2015, Cobain said she was not a fan of grunge bands, instead preferring the music of artists such as Oasis, The Brian Jonestown Massacre, and Mercury Rev, but has said she likes the Nirvana songs "Territorial Pissings" and "Dumb".

During Cobain's divorce proceedings from Isaiah Silva, it was revealed she earned, from July 2016 until June 2017, $95,496 per month from royalties related to her father's estate, in addition to $6,784 per month in dividends ($102,280 total per month, $1.2 million per year). Her net worth was estimated at $11.3 million. Her father's estate was valued in 2014 as being worth $450 million.

On September 30, 2017, Cobain was aboard Air France Flight 066 when the aircraft experienced an engine explosion, forcing the pilot to make an emergency landing.

On February 13, 2018, she announced that she was celebrating two years of sobriety. She wrote, "The fact that I'm sober isn't really public knowledge, decidedly and deliberately. But I think it's more important to put aside my fear about being judged or misunderstood or typecast as one specific thing."

=== Marriages ===
Cobain married The Eeries' lead singer Isaiah Silva on June 29, 2014, though the wedding date was widely misreported as September 2015. By March 23, 2016, she had filed for divorce. The divorce was finalized November 30, 2017.

In 2021, Cobain began dating skateboarder Riley Hawk, the son of Tony Hawk. They married in Los Angeles on October 7, 2023, with R.E.M. lead singer Michael Stipe (Cobain's godfather) officiating the ceremony. The couple welcomed their first child together, a son named Ronin Walker Cobain Hawk, in September 2024.
