= Martin Greenberg =

Martin Greenberg may refer to:

- Martin Greenberg (publisher) (1918–2013), American book publisher, founder of Gnome Press
- Martin Greenberg (poet) (1918–2021), American poet and translator of Goethe
- Martin H. Greenberg (1941–2011), American anthologist and writer
- Martin L. Greenberg (born 1932), American politician and jurist
