= The Widow's Children =

Novel by Paula Fox

The Widow’s Children
- Book jacket of original edition
- Author: Paula Fox
- Language: English
- Publisher: Dutton
- Publication date: 1976
- Dewey Decimal: 813.54
- LC Class: PZ4.F7925 Wi

The Widow’s Children is a novel by American writer Paula Fox, first published in 1976. The book evoked bewilderment as well as praise when first published. Reissued once in 1986, it went out of print in 1990. A paperback was issued by publisher W. W. Norton in 1999. It is considered by many to be Fox's masterpiece.

== Title ==
The title is derived from a poem by Rainer Maria Rilke called "Widow".

== Characters ==
There are five characters, a cast that revolves around the first.

1. Laura Maldonada Clapper - A 55-year-old faded beauty, twice married and daughter of the widow Alma
2. Desmond Clapper - her alcoholic husband
3. Clara - her timid daughter
4. Carlos Maldonada - her openly gay brother, a failed music critic
5. Peter Rice - her old friend and book editor

== Plot ==
The book is broken into seven chapters of unequal length: "Drinks," "Corridor," "Restaurant," "The Messenger," "The Brothers," "Clara," and "The Funeral."

Alma, the matriarch of the family, has died in a nursing home the day before Laura & Desmond are scheduled to leave on a trip to Africa. Although Laura has been notified of this over the phone she decides to tell no one. That evening a bon voyage party is held with the rest of the characters attending. Starting in the Desmond's hotel room, the narrative follows the superficial talk and the corresponding intense associated currents of thought. Later, after traveling down a corridor, they move through the rainy New York city streets to a flashy hotel where the "light" conversation continues and the shifting tension between the principals intensifies. Laura, dramatically and unexpectedly has an emotional outburst, seemingly over nothing, and flees out into the streets. The rest go their separate ways. Later Laura arrives at the hotel completely drenched and emotionally spent. She seems to be on the verge of an emotional collapse. "What is it?" Desmond cries. "My mother is dead," Laura whispers. "She's dead..." At Desmond's request Peter visits Laura's two brothers, Carlos and Eugenio, to deliver the news. Laura has made it clear to Peter that she doesn't want Clara to be told of the death of her grandmother. "In a swirl of accusations and recriminations, thoughtless actions and sleep-deprived conversations, the final movement unrolls swiftly through a long dark night of the soul and into Alma's funeral the next day."

== Publication history ==
- 1976, USA, E.P. Dutton and Co., Inc. ISBN 0-525-23377-6, Hardback

Her fourth adult novel, The Widow’s Children was rejected by thirteen publishers before it was finally accepted by Dutton/Plume.

== Literary significance and reception ==
Although the plot seems simple, almost trivial, "what's important is what's going on underneath: what the characters don't say, to each other or to themselves; what they are thinking, what they feel; the long secret history of their uprooted, once Spanish, family. The intensity of those subterranean moments is part of what has kept the novel from dating. Even now it feels startlingly contemporary in its acceptance of multiple forms of sexuality, its sharp focus on the nature of identity and the costs of exile, and its grasp of what we now label "dysfunctional families."

"There is only a little more plot than there is in Woolf's The Waves, and, like The Waves, the swells and falls issue from an ensemble of endlessly interesting people—thinking about each other, reacting to each other, talking to (and arguing with) each other, trying to connect or to forsake connection. Because most of these people are related, it's also a novel about family, and that Pandora's box of rampant emotions. In bursts of energy, invention, absurdity, and passion, Fox lets those emotions fly out and injure or assuage where they will."
