= Faith Baldwin Romance Theatre =

American TV anthology series (1951)

Faith Baldwin Romance Theatre (also known as Faith Baldwin's Theatre of Romance) is a 1951 half-hour dramatic American television anthology series hosted by writer Faith Baldwin. The show aired from January 20 to October 20, 1951.

The program was sponsored by Maidenform. The trade publication Billboard reported that although ratings were good, the Weintraub agency and three of its clients decided to end "their attempt to program marginal time on Saturday morning" on ABC by canceling this program and two others.

Walter Abel and Sylvia Field starred in the premiere episode, "To My Beloved Wife". Other guest stars included Luise Rainer, Colleen Gray, Nina Foch, Jeffrey Lynn, Constance Bennett, John Carradine, and Joseph Schildkraut.

Other episodes included "The Sleeping Beauty", starring Ilona Massey, on October 6, 1951.

Jack Barry, Dan Enright, and Geoffrey Jones were the producers, and Charles Powers was the director. Abby Boretz and Ruby Sully were the writers.
