= Faith Baldwin =

American novelist (1893–1978)

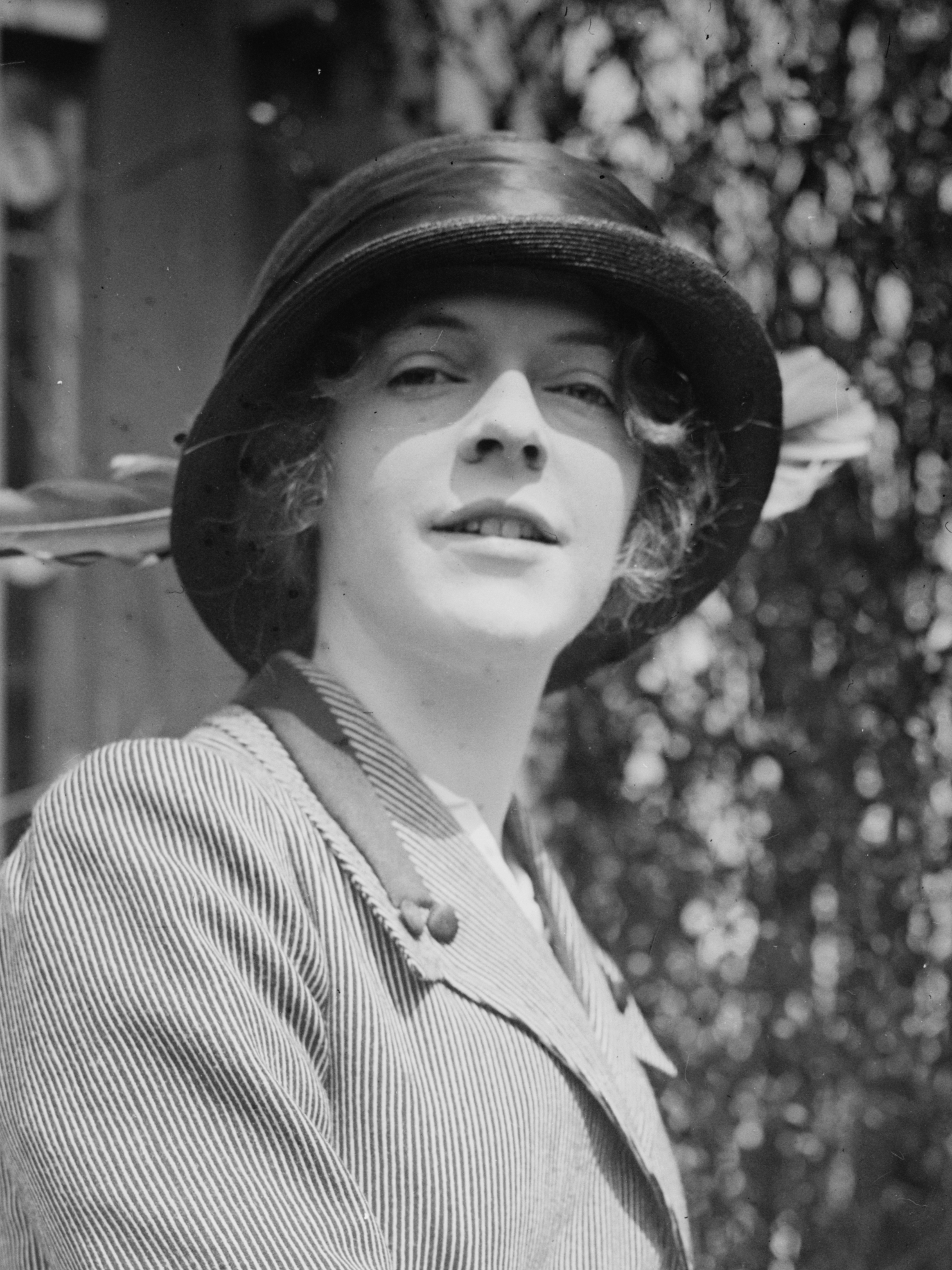
- Baldwin circa 1913
- Born: October 1, 1893; New Rochelle, New York, U.S.
- Died: March 18, 1978 (aged 84); Norwalk, Connecticut, U.S.
- Occupation: Novelist
- Spouse: Hugh Hamlin Cuthrell (m. 1920; died 1953)
- Children: 4
- Relatives: Paul Hervey Fox (cousin)
- Writing career
- Period: 1920s–1970s
- Genres: Romance, women's fiction

Faith Baldwin (October 1, 1893 – March 18, 1978) was an American writer of romance novels and other forms of fiction, often concentrating on women characters juggling career and family. The New York Times wrote that her books had "never a pretense at literary significance" and were popular because they "enabled lonely working people, young and old, to identify with her glamorous and wealthy characters".

== Early life ==
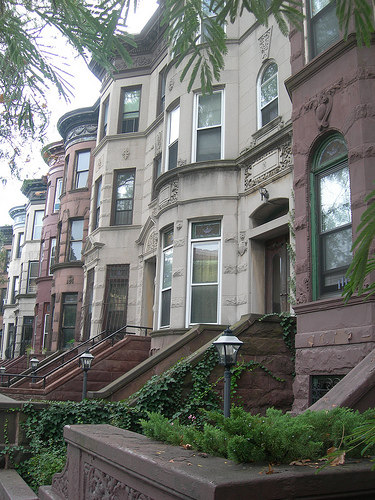
An example of a brownstone in Brooklyn Heights, similar to one at which Baldwin might have lived.

Faith Baldwin was born on October 1, 1893, in New Rochelle, New York, the daughter of a well-known trial lawyer, Stephen Baldwin, and Edith Finch Baldwin. Her cousin was screenwriter Paul Hervey Fox. After three years, her family moved to Manhattan and finally settled in Brooklyn Heights, an upper-middle-class neighborhood in New York City. In 1901, her younger sister Esther was born. In Brooklyn Heights, Baldwin lived an upscale childhood which would influence the settings and scenarios of her later work. She learned how to read at the age of three and wanted to become an actress, sending letters to actresses she admired and occasionally meeting them. According to Baldwin, her parents were startled by her reading at such an early age. She noted later in life that she never intended to become a writer despite her frequent practice, as she viewed acting as a way to become independent. Accustomed to an affluent lifestyle, Baldwin, in 1914, resided for two years in Europe, living with one of her mother's close friends in Dresden, Germany. She was sent to cooking school and learned German, even though World War I was raging. She later recalled, "Life didn't change for us because of the war. ... we continued to go to the opera." Baldwin returned to the United States in 1916, and after the U.S. entered the war, she began working for the War Camp Community Service. It was during her community service activities that she met Hugh H. Cuthrell, a Navy pilot and executive of Brooklyn Union Gas Company; they were married in 1920.

== Career ==
Baldwin's writing career began in earnest when her first novel, Mavis of Green Hill, was published in 1921 by Boston publisher Small, Maynard & Company. Six years later, in 1927, she sold her first serial to a magazine, Good Housekeeping. This led to more serials for "women's magazines" that published romance novels as six-part serials, and her popularity with the middle-class and working women audience quickly grew. Eventually she was able to command upwards of $55,000 for serialization rights to her novels, which appeared in publications such as Cosmopolitan, Good Housekeeping, and The Ladies Home Journal. In 1935, she was described as the newest of the "highly paid" women romance writers by Time magazine. Her popularity was at its peak in the 1930s, and in 1936 she earned over $300,000 (approximately equivalent to $4 million in 2005). In the 1950s, she was still going strong, with earnings over $2 million, sales over 10 million in all editions, and "one of the handful of living novelists to complete a five-foot shelf". In total, Baldwin wrote about 85 books, including 60 novels, two books of poetry, and countless dozens of short stories and magazine articles.

In 1951, Baldwin hosted a weekly television anthology program on Saturday afternoons, called Faith Baldwin Romance Theatre.

From 1958 to 1965, she wrote a column that was published in Woman's Day called "The Open Door". Baldwin continued to write until her death in 1978. She was often quoted by others, and her comments are now often found in books of quotes and on web sites that offer quotes. Several of her stories and novels were adapted to the big screen.

In the late 1960s, Baldwin's name was used in a dubious advertising campaign for the Famous Writers School, a correspondence school. She was listed as a "guiding faculty" member, along with other "faculty", including Bennett Cerf, Bergen Evans, Bruce Catton, Mignon G. Eberhart, John Caples, J. D. Ratcliff, Mark Wiseman, Max Shulman, Rudolf Flesch, Red Smith, and Rod Serling. The advertising drew sharp criticism and accusations as deceptive because the inattentive reader may have inferred from the ad copy that the listed famous writers personally reviewed and provided critiques of students' work, which was not true.

Later in life when asked about her life philosophy, Baldwin responded that her belief was simple: "It is in God and His spirit in mankind. It is in man and his struggle. It is in the Golden Rule and in the valor of men, however ignoble their shortcomings."

== Death ==
On March 18, 1978, Baldwin died at her home in Norwalk, Connecticut, of a heart attack. She was 84 years old.

== Personal life ==
In 1920, at the age of 27, Baldwin married Hugh H. Cuthrell in Brooklyn. He died in 1953. She had four children with Cuthrell: sons Hugh Jr. and Stephen, and daughters Hervey and Ann. Hugh H. Cuthrell later became president and chairman of the board of the Brooklyn Union Gas Company. Hugh Jr. died in a car accident in 1960. At her death, Baldwin was survived by her three other children as well as her sister, Esther.

For many years, Baldwin lived in a 14-room house in Norwalk, Connecticut, called Fabled Farm. Situated on 8 1/2 acres, the house, which was built in 1800, was both her home and studio.

== List of works ==
- Mavis of Green Hill (1921)
- Those Difficult Years (1925)
- Laurel of Stonystream (1923)
- Magic and Mary Rose (1924)
- Sign Posts (1924) poems
- Thresholds (1925)
- Three Women (1926)
- Departing Wings (1927)
- Alimony (1928)
- Betty (1928)
- Rosalie's Career (1928)
- Broadway Interlude (1929) (with Achmed Abdullah)
- Garden Oats (1929)
- Incredible Year (1929)
- Broadway Sensation (1930) (with Achmed Abdullah)
- Judy: A Story of Divine Corners (1930)
- Make-Believe (1930)
- The Office Wife (1929)
- Babs, A Story of Devine Corners (1931)
- Mary Lou, A Story of Divine Corners (1931)
- Skyscraper (1931)
- Today's Virtue (1931)
- District Nurse (1932)
- Girl on the Make (1932) (with Achmed Abdullah)
- Myra, A Story of Divine Corners (1932)
- Self-Made Woman (1932)
- Weekend Marriage (1932)
- Beauty (1933)
- Love's a Puzzle (1933)
- White Collar Girl (1933)
- American Family (1934)
- Honor Bound (1934)
- Innocent Bystander (1934)
- Within a Year (1934)
- Wife vs. Secretary (1935)
- The Puritan Strain (1935)
- Men Are Such Fools (1936)
- The Moon's Our Home (1936)
- Private Duty (1936)
- Heart Has Wings (1937)
- Manhattan Nights (1937)
- That Man Is Mine (1937)
- Twenty-Four Hours a Day (1937)
- Enchanted Oasis (1938)
- Hotel Hostess (1938)
- Rich Girl, Poor Girl (1938)
- Comet Over Broadway (1938)
- Career by Proxy (1939)
- High Road (1939)
- Station Wagon Set (1939)
- White Magic (1939)
- The High Road (1939)
- Arizona Star (1940)
- Letty and the Law (1940)
- Medical Center (1940)
- Rehearsal for Love (1940)
- Something Special (1940)
- And New Stars Burn (1941)
- Heart Remembers (1941)
- Temporary Address: Reno (1941)
- Blue Horizons (1942)
- Breath of Life (1942)
- Rest of My Life with You (1942)
- Washington USA (1943)
- You Can't Escape (1943)
- Change of Heart (1944)
- He Married a Doctor (1944)
- A Job for Jenny (1945)
- No Private Heaven (1946)
- Woman on Her Way (1946)
- Give Love the Air (1947)
- Sleeping Beauty (1947)
- An Apartment for Jenny (1947)
- Marry for Money (1948)
- Golden Shoestring (1949)
- For Richer, For Poorer (1949)
- Look Out for Liza (1950)
- Tell Me My Heart (1950) UK title
- The Whole Armour (1951)
- Juniper Tree (1952)
- Widow's Walk, Variations on a Theme (1954) poems
- Face Towards the Spring (1956)
- Many Windows: Seasons of the Heart (1958)
- Three Faces of Love (1958)
- Blaze of Sunlight (1960)
- Testament of Trust (1960)
- Harvest of Hope (1962)
- The West Wind (1963)
- Living by Faith (1964)
- Lonely Man (1964)
- The Lonely Doctor (1964)
- Search For Tomorrow (1966) – novel based on the long-running TV serial
- Evening Star (1966)
- There Is a Season (1966)
- Velvet Hammer (1969)
- Take What You Want (1971)
- Any Village (1972)
- One More Time (1972)
- No Bed of Roses (1973)
- New Girl in Town (1975)
- Time and the Hour (1975)
- Hold on to Your Heart (1976) UK title
- Thursday's Child (1976)
- Adam's Eden (1977)
