= Desperate Characters (film) =

1971 film by Frank D. Gilroy

- Theatrical release poster
- Directed by: Frank D. Gilroy
- Written by: Frank D. Gilroy
- Based on: novel Desperate Characters by Paula Fox
- Produced by: Frank D. Gilroy
- Starring: Shirley MacLaine; Kenneth Mars
- Cinematography: Urs Furrer
- Edited by: Robert Q. Lovett
- Music by: Ron Carter; Jim Hall; Lee Konitz
- Production company: ITC Entertainment
- Distributed by: Paramount Pictures
- Release date: September 22, 1971
- Running time: 97 minutes
- Country: United States
- Language: English
- Budget: $350,000

Desperate Characters is a 1971 American drama film produced, written, and directed by Frank D. Gilroy, who based his screenplay on the 1970 novel of the same name by Paula Fox.

== Plot ==
Sophie (Shirley MacLaine) and Otto Bentwood (Kenneth Mars) are an affluent, childless, middle-aged couple living a rigid, insular life in a newly gentrified Brooklyn brownstone. Sophie works from home as a French-to-English book translator, while Otto is a corporate attorney undergoing a stressful, acrimonious split from his long-time idealistic law partner, Charlie Russell (Gerald S. O'Loughlin). Though surrounded by material comfort, the Bentwoods are trapped in a deeply alienated, emotionally hollow marriage, and they find themselves increasingly paralyzed by a severe sense of urban paranoia and the visible decay of the changing New York City landscape around them.

The narrative unfolds over the course of a single tense weekend. While looking out her kitchen window, Sophie notices a stray white cat. Driven by a rare spark of compassion, she attempts to feed it, but the untamed animal violently bites her hand. Otto insists the cat is fine, but because it is the weekend, the couple cannot reach their regular doctor and are left to deal with an automated answering service. The incident leaves Sophie quietly terrified that she may have contracted rabies, a fear that serves as an ongoing metaphor for the internal toxicity and slow rot consuming her life and marriage.

As the weekend progresses, the couple's sense of insulation is repeatedly shattered by external intrusions that mirror their internal psychological instability. A rock is suddenly thrown through their bedroom window. Sophie receives an unsettling, obscene phone call. Later, a stranded Black man knocks on their door asking to use their telephone. Otto, driven by a mixture of deep-seated suspicion and white liberal guilt, reluctantly allows him in, eventually giving the man ten dollars just to make him leave.

The couple goes out to interact with their social circle, but these encounters only reinforce their existential malaise. Sophie has lunch with Claire (Sada Thompson), a close friend whose own marriage has crumbled into a passionless arrangement. At a party, Sophie runs into Francis Early (Michael Higgins), a man with whom she previously had a passionate six-month extramarital affair. When Charlie questions her about the end of the affair and how she is coping, Sophie numbly replies that she feels nothing but "fatigue, anemia, all the symptoms of irreversible loss."

Desperate to escape the claustrophobic dread of the city, Sophie and Otto drive out to their country summer home in the dead of winter. However, their brief moment of solace is destroyed when they arrive to find that the house has been aggressively broken into and completely vandalized. Their sense of violation is total; the security and privilege they thought they possessed has utterly failed to protect them. Returning home, they make love, but the act is devoid of tenderness and driven instead by cold, aggressive frustration.

On Monday morning, after Otto forces the capture and subsequent euthanization of the stray cat so it can be tested, the immediate threat of rabies is lifted. Yet, the psychological damage is done. The ultimate breakdown occurs when Otto receives another frantic phone call from his ex-partner Charlie, who yells out that he is "desperate." Overcome by a sudden explosion of pent-up, impotent rage, Otto echoes the shout, "He's desperate!" and violently hurls a bottle of ink against the wall. The film ends on this jarring image of destruction, leaving the couple frozen in their unresolved, quiet desperation.

== Cast ==
- Shirley MacLaine as Sophie Bentwood
- Kenneth Mars as Otto Bentwood
- Sada Thompson as Claire
- Jack Somack as Leon
- Gerald S. O'Loughlin as Charlie
- Chris Gampel as Mike Holstein
- Mary Alan Hokanson as Flo Holstein
- Robert Bauer as Young Man
- Carol Kane as Young Girl
- Michael Higgins as Francis Early
- Michael McAloney as Raconteur
- Wallace Rooney as Man on Subway
- Rose Gregorio as Ruth
- Elena Karam as Saleslady
- Nick Smith as The Caller
- Robert Delbert as Hospital Attendant
- Shauneille Perry as Woman Doctor
- Robert Bauer as Young Man
- Gonzalee Ford as Nurse
- Patrick McVey as Mr. Haynes
- L.J. Davis as Tom

== Production ==
Fox said she was paid $35,000 for the film rights and that the movie cost $350,000. Frank Gilroy wrote the script and showed it to a friend, the writer John Gay, who showed it to Shirley MacLaine. She wanted to make the film but Gilroy was reluctant at first until he met her. "Right away I could see that I had the wrong impression of her," said Gilroy. "She's a full-blown woman, very bright, nothing like the featherbrained twits she used to play."

Sir Lew Grade had signed Shirley MacLaine to make a TV series Shirley's World. She asked Grade to fund the film which she did for minimal payment and a share of the profits; Grade agreed. It was Grade's first feature film.

The movie was filmed over six weeks starting in October 1970. It was entirely shot on location in New York. The movie was followed by another MacLaine film financed by Grade, The Possession of Joel Delaney.

"No body got any money on it," said MacLaine. "I worked for $200 a week... I saw something of myself in that woman. The propensity for catatonia is in all of us. What she did was complain and then try and adjust. I'm sort of like that."

In 1970, Shirley MacLaine said she was 'embarrassed' by her nude scene in this film.

== Reception ==
Grade says the budget was so low he managed to recoup his money.

Fox said she liked Gilroy "a lot" but felt "there was something about the movie, it didn’t work." In particular, she felt Kenneth Mars "spoiled the whole movie, because he was too funny... The whole thing lacked a certain kind of inner gravity. And the part that was best in it was the Flynders part. But it wasn’t very good, it wasn’t successful."

=== Critical reception ===
Variety called it "a film of qualities and quality, a no-holds-barred look at the grim realities of the seemingly irreversible disintegration of physical and human values in American life."

In his review in The New York Times, Vincent Canby wrote "I must confess that Desperate Characters left me, if not unmoved, then unenriched. It's as if its cheerlessness had been bottled straight, without the additive that transforms recognizable experience into art...In every respect, the screenplay is a vast improvement over Gilroy's Pulitzer Prize-winning The Subject Was Roses. Its literary style, however, is similar, and it's a style to which I...find it difficult to respond. His characters talk in great chunks of theatrical exchanges, and monologues, which not only deny the splendid accuracy of the situations and the settings, but also somehow make me suspicious of the integrity of the characters. This is especially true of the supporting characters, who are always telling us too much, remembering too many details out of the past, nudging us for sympathy and never letting us discover them at our own speed...I have a feeling that the director has perfectly served the writer. That is to say that Gilroy has realized the movie he intended to make. I wish I liked it more."

Roger Ebert of the Chicago Sun-Times described it as "a terribly interesting and well-acted movie that does not deserve some of the criticism it's getting...Kenneth Mars offers a deeply felt, complex performance...Shirley MacLaine, as his wife, achieves one of the great performances of the year. She proves that we were right, when we saw her in films like The Apartment, to know that she really had it all, could go all the way with a serious role. Watching Miss MacLaine and Mars work together is enough to justify the movie, whatever you think of its urban paranoia."

TV Guide rates it 3½ out of a possible four stars and calls it a "well-written if somewhat stagey character study [with] one of Maclaine's best performances."

Stanley Kauffmann of The New Republic called this "a film of authenticity, of delicately realized intangibles: small-scale about large issues, truthful without settling for honest-to-God TV fact." He lists it as a "top film worth seeing" in late 1971. 9/25/71, Vol. 165 Issue 13, p24-34, 2p

== Awards and nominations ==
- 21st Berlin International Film Festival:
  - Silver Bear for Best Actress (Shirley MacLaine, co-winner with Simone Signoret)
  - Silver Bear for an outstanding single achievement (winner)
  - Silver Bear for Best Screenplay (winner)
  - UNICRIT Award (Frank D. Gilroy, winner)
  - Golden Bear for Best Picture (nominee)

== See also ==
- List of American films of 1971
