= Thomas Locker =

American painter

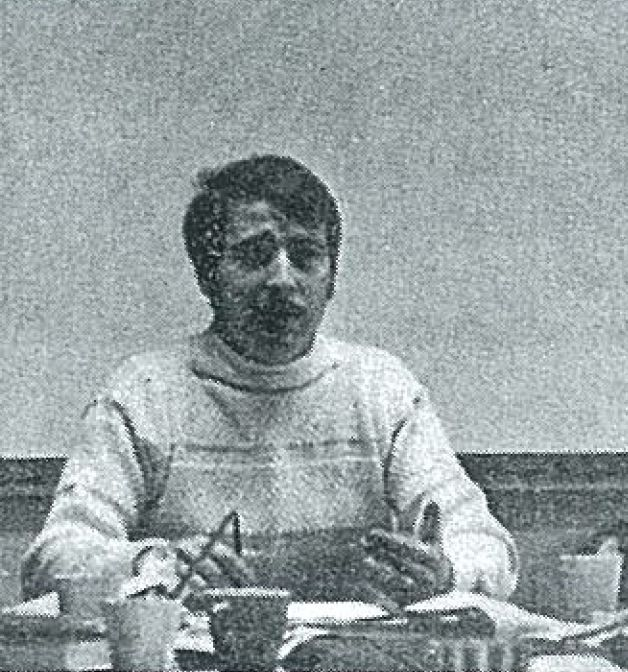
Thomas Locker teaching at Shimer College

Thomas Locker (June 26, 1937 — March 9, 2012) was an American landscape painter and award-winning illustrator, and author of children's literature His oil paintings follow in the tradition of the 19th-century Hudson River School of painting.

Born in New York City, Thomas Locker was raised in Washington D.C. where his father worked as a lobbyist. At age six he started training in traditional old-world techniques with painter Umberto Roberto Romano . At age seven, Locker won first prize in the children's division of the Washington Times-Herald annual art fair. Locker earned an A.B. in Art History at the University of Chicago and an M.A. from the American University, Washington DC. While at the University of Chicago he studied under professor Joshua C. Taylor , future director of the Smithsonian American Art Museum. After graduating, he studied art while travelling in Europe.

In 1964 Locker began his more than 75 solo exhibitions career, starting with the Banter Gallery, New York City. He painted 17th century Dutch-inspired oil landscapes, selling through Sears' The Vincent Price Collection, Chicago. During these years he also taught at Franklin College and Shimer College, while he and his wife raised their five children.

In 1982, Locker began bringing the world of fine painting to children and young adults, producing thirty-six popular illustrated books. He authored most of these books and illustrated with his Hudson River School style oil paintings. Several books were collaborative works with his second wife, chemistry teacher and weaving expert Candace Christiansen. Locker also illustrated books for other popular writers such as Jean Craighead George. Many of these books became staples of school libraries. Locker's works received numerous awards including the 1989 Christopher Award, the John Burroughs Medal, the 1984 New York Times Book Review Best Illustrated Children's Book and the ALA Notable Books for Children list.

Locker experienced a near-death aneurysm in 2002. After this he moved from the Hudson River Valley to the less populated Catskills and returned to full-time oil painting of the American landscape. He remained in Albany, N.Y. until his death in 2012, at the age of 74.

== Books ==
Narrative stories and/or history

- Where the River Begins (1984)
- The Mare on the Hill (1985)
- Sailing with the Wind (1986)
- Family Farm (1988)
- Anna and the Bagpiper
- The Ice Horse (1993) by Candace Christiansen; A boy ice harvests on the Hudson River
- Grandfather's Christmas Tree
- The Boy Who Held Back the Sea. A retelling of the traditional Dutch folktale (1993) Hans Brinker
- Washington Irving's Rip Van Winkle
- The Ugly Duckling as told by Marianna Mayer
- Calico and Tin Horns (1992) by Candace Christiansen; dramatization of the Anti-rent Wars
- The First Thanksgiving (2001), with Jean Craighead George

Narrative stories - art themes

- The Young Artist (1989)
- Miranda's Smile (1994)
- Rembrandt and Titus: Artist and Son; by Madeleine Comora
- Rembrandt and Titus Classroom Posters

Nature and Science

- To Climb a Waterfall (1995)
- Sky Tree: Seeing Science Through Art (1995)
- Water Dance (1997)
- Cloud Dance (2000)
- Mountain Dance (2001)
- Hudson: The Story of a River (2004), with Robert C Baron
- In Blue Mountains: An Artist's Return to America's First Wilderness (2000)

Literature and philosophy

- Snow Toward Evening: A Year in a River Valley / Nature Poems selected by Josette Frank (1990)
- Catskill Eagle by Herman Melville (1991)
- Home: A Journey through America (2000) literary selections of American writers, including Willa Cather and Henry David Thoreau
- Journey to the Mountaintop: On Living and Meaning (2007) A writer and a painter's reflections, journeying in the Catskill Mountains and Kaaterskill Falls.

Conservation

- Images of Conservationists (Series): Walking With Henry: Based on the Life and Works of Henry David Thoreau (2002)
- Images of Conservationists (Series): Rachel Carson: Preserving a Sense of Wonder
- Images of Conservationists (Series): John Muir: America's Naturalist
- Images of Conservationists (Series): Teacher's Guide to John Muir

Native American

- Thirteen Moons on Turtle's Back: A Native American Year of Moons (1992)
- The Land of Gray Wolf
- The Earth Under Sky Bear's Feet
- Between Earth & Sky: Legends of Native American Sacred Places

Interview

- The Man Who Paints Nature by Thomas Locker (Meet the Author series; Richard C. Owen Publishers)

=== Exhibition catalogs ===
- Exhibition catalog: "Thomas Locker: The New American Realism" (R.S. Johnson-International Gallery, Spring, 1972)
- Exhibition catalog: "Thomas Locker: American landscapes: [exhibition] September 16-October 4, 1980, Hammer Galleries, New York"
