= A Gentleman at Heart =

1942 film by Ray McCarey

- Directed by: Ray McCarey
- Written by: Harold Buchman; Lee Loeb; Paul Hervey Fox
- Produced by: Walter Morosco
- Starring: Cesar Romero; Carole Landis; Milton Berle
- Cinematography: Charles G. Clarke
- Edited by: J. Watson Webb Jr.
- Production company: Twentieth Century-Fox
- Distributed by: Twentieth Century-Fox
- Release date: January 16, 1942
- Running time: 66-70 minutes
- Country: United States
- Language: English

A Gentleman at Heart is a 1942 romantic comedy film starring Cesar Romero, Carole Landis, and Milton Berle. A bookie acquires an interest in an art gallery.

== Plot ==
Lucky Cullen (Milton Berle) gets into trouble when his boss, bookie Tony Miller (Cesar Romero), finds out that Lucky has bet (and lost) $5000 under a false identity. Tony gives Lucky 24 hours to settle the debt.

Lucky learns that he has inherited a Fifth Avenue art gallery from his uncle. When he and Tony check it out, however, Helen Mason (Carole Landis) informs them that the business is so far in debt it is worthless. Attracted to Helen, Tony cancels Lucky's debt in exchange for the gallery. He takes Helen out to dinner and gets her to start teaching him about art. When Tony finds gallery employee Stewart Haines (Richard Derr) kissing Helen, he sends Stewart on a buying trip to Europe.

Meanwhile, Lucky is pestered by "Genius" (Elisha Cook, Jr.), a struggling painter. Just to get rid of him, Lucky gives him $10 for his abstract paintings. Thrilled, Genius returns again and again with more of his work. To Lucky's surprise, a patron later buys Genius's work.

Trying to impress Helen, Tony buys a Rembrandt from Claire Barrington (Rose Hobart) for $20,000, only to have the gallery's art expert, Appleby (Francis Pierlot), unmask the painting as a very good fake. Tony confronts Claire and Gigi (J. Carrol Naish), the forger, and retrieves his money. Then he has an idea. Helen had told him about a missing Velasquez, Two Children in the Court. Tony gets Gigi to paint a copy. He then presents it to a thrilled Helen to sell at an auction at the gallery.

Tony becomes concerned when government buyer Finchley enters the bidding. He orders Lucky to buy the painting, but Helen stops him, and Finchley gets the work for $84,000. Further complications arise when Stewart returns from his trip with Don Fernando (Steven Geray) and the genuine painting. After Lucky kidnaps Don Fernando, a worried Tony buys the work for $100,000, then switches it with Gigi's forgery, only to have the government expert dismiss it as a bad copy. Helen insists that other experts be brought in. While they wait, Tony confesses the truth to her. Meanwhile, Gigi substitutes his (much better) forgery, and the new experts are satisfied it is genuine. To show Helen that he is not in it for the money anymore, Tony donates it to the government free of charge.

Tony gives the gallery to Helen and Stewart and returns to what he knows. Helen shows up at the racetrack and forgives him. Lucky then returns Tony's $100,000; he paid Don Fernando with counterfeit money.

== Cast ==
- Cesar Romero as Tony Miller
- Carole Landis as Helen Mason
- Milton Berle as Lucky Cullen
- J. Carrol Naish as Gigi
- Richard Derr as Stewart Haines
- Rose Hobart as Claire Barrington
- Jerome Cowan as Finchley
- Elisha Cook, Jr. as Genius
- Francis Pierlot as Appleby
- Chick Chandler as Louie
- Steven Geray as Don Fernando
- Matt McHugh as Joe
- Kane Richmond as Steve
- Syd Saylor as Lighthouse
- Charles Lane as Holloway
- William Halligan as Higgins
- Bertram Marburgh as Harrison, Art Expert
- LeRoy Mason as Frank
- Dell Henderson as Elliott
