= Soldiers and Women =

1930 film

- Directed by: Edward Sloman
- Written by: Dorothy Howell
- Based on: play, Soldiers and Women, by Paul Hervey Fox and George Tilton
- Produced by: Harry Cohn
- Starring: Aileen Pringle; Grant Withers; Walter McGrail
- Cinematography: Ted Tetzlaff
- Edited by: Leonard Wheeler
- Production company: Columbia Pictures
- Distributed by: Columbia Pictures
- Release date: April 30, 1930
- Running time: 69 minutes
- Country: United States
- Language: English

Soldiers and Women is a 1930 American pre-Code mystery crime film directed by Edward Sloman and starring Aileen Pringle, Grant Withers and Walter McGrail. Produced by Columbia Pictures, it is based on a 1929 stage play by Paul Hervey Fox and George Tilton. A print is preserved by the Library of Congress.

== Plot ==
As described in a film review, Captain Clive Branch of the United States Marine Corps is stationed with the garrison in Haiti, where he is conducting affairs with the wives of two fellow officers. When one of the husbands, after threatening to expose Branch, is mysteriously murdered in the dark, he comes under suspicion of the killing. However, the audience is led to believe that one of the wives is the murderer and the wrong man will pay the penalty. General Mitchell arrives to investigate, and blunders his way from one clue to another, each suggesting a motive indicating one person and then another. Finally, the clues show that the general's own daughter was the jealous person who fired the shot to save exposure from her own love affair. The kindly but sometimes dumb general, holds steadfast to justice and redeems his character.

== Cast ==
- Aileen Pringle as Brenda Ritchie
- Grant Withers as Captain Clive Branch
- Judith Wood as Helen Arnold
- Walter McGrail as Captain Arnold
- Emmett Corrigan as General Mitchell
- Blanche Friderici as Martha
- Wade Boteler as Sgt. Conlon
- Raymond Largay as Colonel Ritchie
- William Colvin as Doctor
- Sam Nelson as Pvt. Delehanty
