= The Slave Dancer =

1973 historical novel by Paula Fox

- The cover of the first edition of the book, published in 1973
- Author: Paula Fox
- Translator: Bruce Davis
- Illustrator: Eros Keith
- Cover artist: Eros Keith
- Language: English
- Genre: Historical novel
- Publisher: Bradbury Press
- Publication date: October 1973
- Publication place: United States
- Media type: Print (Hardback & Paperback)
- Pages: 176 pages
- ISBN: 0-87888-062-3
- OCLC: 804264
- LC Class: PZ7.F838 Sl

The Slave Dancer is a historical novel written by Paula Fox and published in 1973. It tells the story of a boy called Jessie Bollier who witnessed first-hand the savagery of the Atlantic slave trade. The book not only includes a historical account, but it also touches upon the emotional conflicts felt by those involved in transporting the slaves from Africa to other parts of the world. It tells the story of a thirteen-year-old boy, Jessie Bollier, who is put in a position which allows him to see the African slave trade in person. Jessie is captured from his New Orleans home and brought to an American ship. There he is forced to play the fife in order to keep the other slaves dancing, and thus strong when they arrive at their destination. The book received the Newbery Medal in 1974.

== Plot ==
It was the beginning of 1842 in New Orleans. In the rain, drunken riverboat workers and slaves alike are celebrating. Jessie Bollier lives in the area with his mother and sister. One evening while he is walking home, Jessie is kidnapped. After he is captured, he is taken to the ship 'The Moonlight', a slaver. During the crossing to Africa, Jessie tries to learn as much about the ship and the way things are done there as he can. The captain, Cawthorne, seems mad, the first mate, Nicholas Spark is cruel, and the sailors are concerned solely with making money through the slave trade. When they get to Africa they travel the coast and the captain uses a small boat to go and meet with the African chiefs who are selling people into slavery.

Jessie cannot believe the treatment of the enslaved people that he observes. Once they are taken onto the ship, they are packed as tightly as possible into the hold, ending up on top of one another. Whenever a slave becomes ill they are thrown overboard at once so that the illness will not spread to other slaves. Many of them are still alive when they are tossed into the water, where they are eaten by sharks or drown. Jessie is shocked by what is going on, but tries to keep himself focused on staying alive and getting home to his family, if he ever will. As the journey to America continues, Jessie realizes how much he hates everything around him, including the slaves, as they represent his own enslavement on the ship. He refuses to play the fife and goes to his quarters. He is immediately taken back on deck and flogged for being disobedient. The flogging only makes him think more about everything that is going on around him. He sees the sailors with the same lack of pity they have for the slaves. He hates himself for playing the fife and being part of the entire situation. The journey continues and conditions worsen. The crew is drunk much of the time, the ship dirty, and discipline lax. A slave attacks Nicholas Spark, one of the ship's mates, and Spark shoots and kills him. For this offence, Spark is thrown overboard. The only concern the sailors show is for the loss of the profit that the sale of the slave would have brought them.

When the ship is nearing Cuba, another ship approaches it and the captain becomes afraid of what it might represent, as both British and American ships patrol to guard against the slave trade. The crew begins throwing its chains, and then the slaves, into the ocean waters. Jessie can do nothing to stop this, as much as he might like to. He sees even very young children being thrown overboard. He does manage to get a young boy of his own age back to the slave hold, where they hide while their ship sails past the other ship. A fierce storm then arises. After a few days, Jessie and the boy come out of the hold and discover that the ship is sinking. The crew members are either dead or missing. The pair then uses part of the mast to float on, and they manage to swim to shore. Jessie and the boy end up in Mississippi, where they are found by an escaped slave.

The slave is an old man who is living in the woods of Mississippi. His name is Daniel. He gives them food and helps them regain their health. He then makes arrangements for some other people to take the enslaved boy (whose name is Ras) to the north, where he can be free. He gives directions to Jessie so that he can walk back to New Orleans, which should take three days. The man asks Jessie not to mention him to anyone, as that could lead to the man being recaptured and returned to a life of slavery. Jessie walks back home to his mother and sister, and everything sets back to normal, except for one thing, himself. He no longer holds aspirations of becoming rich because he wants nothing to do with anything that might have any connection to slavery. In time, he decides to become an apothecary and moves to Rhode Island, a state where there are no slaves. He sends for his mother and sister to join him and settles into a quiet life. He does miss things about the South, and wonders what became of Ras (the enslaved boy) whom he had befriended, but never learns anything more about him. In the Civil War he fights for the North. He marries and has a family of his own. One legacy of his experience on the slave ship is that he can no longer stand to hear music, as it reminds him of the dancing of the slaves.

== Reception ==
Kirkus Reviews said of the book: "...each of the sailors is sharply individualized, the inhuman treatment of the captives is conveyed straight to the nose and stomach rather than the bleeding heart, and the scenes in which Jessie is forced to play his fife to '"dance the slaves"' for their morning exercise become a haunting, focusing image for the whole bizarre undertaking." Author and academic Julius Lester wrote in The New York Times, "This novel describes the horrors of the Middle Passage, but it does not re-create them, and if history is to become a reality, the reader must live that history as if it were his own life. In 'The Slave Dancer' we are only spectators and we should have been fellow sufferers—as slave traders and slaves." In a retrospective essay about the Newbery Medal-winning books from 1966 to 1975, children's author John Rowe Townsend wrote, "In its superficial aspect, The Slave Dancer is a sea-adventure story; yet the true adventure of Jessie Bollier is a spiritual adventure into the most terrible depths of human nature."

Awards
Preceded by Julie of the Wolves	Newbery Medal recipient 1974	Succeeded by M. C. Higgins, the Great
