= Julie's Wolf Pack =

1997 novel by Jean Craighead George

- First edition
- Author: Jean Craighead George
- Illustrator: Wendell Minor
- Series: Julie of the Wolves
- Genre: Children's novel, survival fiction
- Publisher: HarperCollins
- Publication date: 1997
- Publication place: United States
- Media type: Print (hardcover)
- Pages: 191 pp
- ISBN: 0-06-027406-9
- OCLC: 36245584
- LC Class: PZ7.G2933 Ju 1997
- Preceded by: Julie

Julie's Wolf Pack is a 1997 novel written by Jean Craighead George. It is the second sequel to the Newbery Medal winner Julie of the Wolves after Julie, and the last in the Julie of the Wolves trilogy. It is the only book in the series whose story is told from the viewpoint of the wolves themselves, rather than from Julie's point of view.

== Background ==
One day, while looking for wolves from an airplane on the North Slope of Alaska, the idea for a third book in the Julie of the Wolves series occurred to Jean.

== Summary ==
The story is focused more on the wolves. Each part deals with Kapu the black wolf leading his pack, and then his daughter Sweet Fur Amy taking over with her mate Storm Call. The book is divided into three parts.

With the caribou now returned to Kangik, Kapu and his pack—known as the Avaliks—plan to hunt and regain their strength. Kapu, son of Amaroq, has been alpha since his father′s death in the first book, and has managed to hold his status since. When the story starts, the pack consists of himself, his mate Aaka, his brother and beta Zing, his and Aaka′s daughter Sweet Fur Amy (referred to as Amy in the previous book), Kapu and Zing′s mother Silver, and her mate Raw Bones, the former alpha of the Colville River. Raw Bones continuously tries to usurp Kapu′s position as alpha male, but Kapu beats him back every time, occasionally with the help of Zing, Aaka, and more recently, Sweet Fur Amy.

Kapu plans to have the pack hunt caribou throughout the year, so that they will regain their strength. In spite of Kapu's insistence that the pack will not have pups during this time, Silver is impregnated by Raw Bones. Kapu knows Raw Bones did it as an act of defiance, but nonetheless helps his mother and the rest of the pack prepare for the birth. Sweet Fur Amy plans to become the pups' babysitter once they′re born.

Silver gives birth to a litter consisting of two pups, a male and a female. But since Silver had not eaten enough meat while pregnant, she was not able to produce enough milk, and the two pups, named No Growl and Tiny Whimper, become weak. The wolf pack fear that the pups will more than likely not be able to survive the harsh Arctic wilderness. They assume the worse for them. But then Julie arrives, hoping to see the pups, and convinces Kapu, Zing, and Silver to allow her to take them home with her so she and her family can nurse them. When they do, Julie assures them that she′ll return them to their pack when they are strong enough.

With Julie and her family raising them, No Growl and Tiny Whimper—renamed Nutik (“jumper”) and Uqaq (“to talk”)—become strong and healthy. Kapu and his pack remain close to Julie′s home, intent on retrieving the pups when the time come. Complications arise when Silver begins to grow weak, a rival pack move onto the Avalik territory, and the arrival of a strange white wolf known as Ice Blink.

The Avaliks are forced to leave Silver behind so they can confront the rival pack, the wolves of Nuka River. In the fight that occurs between Kapu and the Nuka pack's alpha, Low Wind, Sweet Fur Amy and Aaka capture two Nuka wolves and bring them over to their side. The wolves, Storm Call and his sister Lichen, are the offspring of Low Wind and his mate Moon Seeker. The Avalik wolves accept them into their pack, and they return to Kangik, where they come across Ice Blink and Silver′s now-lifeless body. Ice Blink offers to join the pack, but Kapu shoots her offer down, sensing something off about her. But after a while, since their pack numbers are low, Kapu reluctantly allows her to join.

Kapu and Sweet Fur Amy then go off to retrieve Nutik and Uqaq, but they only make off with Uqaq before Julie stops them, explaining that the pups need to be inoculated against rabies. She had heard talk about a wolf from Canada who could be infected with the rabies virus; the wolf in question is later revealed to be Ice Blink. Sweet Fur Amy lets Nutik go and returns to where the rest of the pack are inspecting Uqaq. As Silver is dead, and Raw Bones is showing no paternal instinct for his daughter, Sweet Fur Amy takes it upon herself to raise Uqaq. She, Uqaq, and Storm Call stay behind to wait for Nutik while Kapu and the other wolves go off to remark their territory. Unfortunately, Nutik stays with Julie and her family for too long; Julie finds it impossible to return him to Sweet Fur Amy. She is saddened by this, but she nonetheless leads Uqaq and Storm Call away. The trio spend the winter hunting caribou together.

As March comes around, both Aaka and Ice Blink go into heat. Aaka and Kapu mate, but Ice Blink, who feels she is not ready for pups yet, allows Raw Bones to court her. They travel to his old territory near the Colville River, which by now has been taken over by a pack from the mountains. The wolves ambush the two, and it is here that Ice Blink succumbs to rabies and bites the alpha female Cloud Berry, passing the disease on to her. She dies hours later, and Raw Bones returns to the Avaliks.

Aaka gives birth to a litter of seven pups, but four of them die during the summer (two fall from a cliff to their deaths, and two more are killed by a bear). Though tragic, Kapu understands that death is common in the wilderness. The pups are mourned, and life goes on.

In the winter, a lone wolf named Wind Voice joins the pack, and the wolves return to Raw Bones's old territory to find it vacant of wolves (Ice Blink′s rabid infection wiped them out). The Avaliks expand their territory so that it includes this land, to Raw Bones′s obvious delight. The second part ends when Kapu gets caught in a trap, sedated by the trappers who learned that Kapu was needed for a scientific experiment, and carried off.

The third part begins with dissension rising after Kapu′s capture, and it falls to Sweet Fur Amy to lead the pack. Raw Bones attempts to fight her for the role as alpha, but she continues to put him in his place. When it comes time for pups to be conceived, Sweet Fur Amy refuses to mate, knowing that the pack would fight and split up if she were to be confined to the den. Uqaq instead becomes a mother for the first time, mating with Wind Voice. At her father's coaxing, she has her nine pups at his treasured den by the Colville River. However, as she had been human-raised, Uqaq finds herself having difficulty caring for her pups, who tussle and nurse relentlessly. Overwhelmed, she abandons them. It falls to Sweet Fur Amy, Storm Call, Lichen, and Aaka to raise the pups, but they only manage to keep three of the nine alive. Raw Bones takes the opportunity to fight Sweet Fur Amy while she is bringing food home to the pups one day. Fed up with his behavior, she fights and drives him away. Humiliated entirely, Raw Bones leaves the Avaliks and spends the rest of his days as a lone wolf. The pack continues on with their life.

Elsewhere, the scientific experiment that involved Kapu is completed, and the people involved consider sending him to a zoo, but Julie pleads with them to return Kapu to his family. Eventually, Kapu is released from captivity as Julie marries Peter and Sweet Fur Amy and Storm Call become parents to a litter of six pups. The book ends with Kapu reuniting with Aaka.

== Wolf Packs ==
- The Avalik Pack: The name of the wolf pack that first appeared in Julie of the Wolves and later in Julie. After his father Amaroq′s death, Kapu becomes the alpha male of the pack. Aaka becomes his alpha female. After part two, he is succeeded by his eldest pup Sweet Fur Amy, who becomes mates with Storm Call. Kapu′s brother Zing holds his position as beta male throughout the book.
  - Other members of this pack include Uqaq, Lichen, Cotton Grass, Long Face, Wind Voice, Big Ears, Bird Egg, and Owl Feathers. Raw Bones, the second mate of Silver (and introduced in Julie), is driven out of the pack in part three.
  - Five other pups of Kapu and Aaka—Grappler, Smiler, White Toes, Black Lips, and Nameless Moonlight—die before reaching adolescence, as do six of Uqaq's pups with Wind Voice.
- Nuka River Pack: The rivals of the Avalik wolves. They are led by Low Wind and Moon Seeker, the parents of Storm Call and Lichen, who join the Avaliks. In part three, the pack is fewer in number, Low Wind has gone missing, and Moon Seeker has taken on a new mate; the Avaliks suspect that Ice Blink may have spread her rabies to the Nukas.
- Mountain Pack: A wolf pack that moved into Raw Bones′ territory when he was away from it too long. They were led by Snow Driver (mistakenly called Storm Driver) and Cloud Berry. Ice Blink infects the pack with rabies, and they are wiped out. Their territory as well as Raw Bones' are taken over by the Avaliks.
- Lower Colville River Pack: Aaka′s former pack. Led by Storm Alarm and Star Gentian.
- Philip Smith Mountain Pack: Led by Sedge Ears and Alder Whisper. Ice Blink attempted to join this pack in part two, but was declined.
- Canadian Pack: The pack Ice Blink hails from. She had led the pack with her mate Bear Scratcher before the rabies killed him, two of their sons, and the remaining pack members.

== Reception ==
J. D. Biersdorfer of The New York Times wrote, "Jean Craighead George has spent decades observing and recording the life styles of the wild and wolfish, and her love for the subject matter is clearly evident in the smooth assuredness of her narrative." Deborah Abbott of the Chicago Sun-Times wrote, "Read alone, or as part of the trilogy, this book captivates."
