= Languages of the Republic of the Congo =

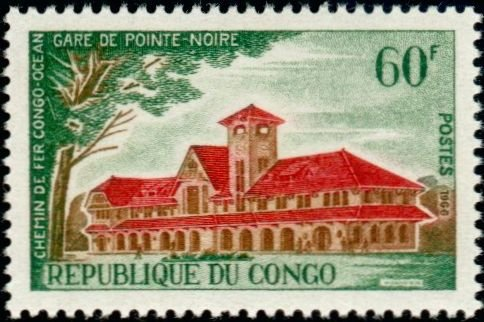
- Congolese stamp with text in French
- Official: French
- National: Kituba, Lingala
- Indigenous: many Southern Bantoid languages
- Vernacular: Français populaire africain
- Foreign: English; Portuguese
- Signed: Nigerian Sign Language
- Keyboard layout: French AZERTY

The official language of the Republic of Congo is French. Other languages are mainly Bantu languages, and the two national languages in the country are Kituba and Lingala, followed by Kongo languages, Téké languages, and more than forty other languages, including languages spoken by Pygmies, which are not Bantu languages.

Republic of Congo is a Francophone country, and in 2024, a study found that French was spoken by 3.89 million people out of a total of 6.33 million (61.4 %).

A 2006 study found that French was spoken by 30% of the Congolese population. According to a study by Omar Massoumou, 88% of those in Brazzaville aged over 15 could write simple phrases in French.

According to Laval University, because of civil wars that rocked the country, French became a "haven language" for various armed factions. For example, speakers who are incompetent in Kituba and Kikongo (especially those in the north), and Lingala (especially those in the south) prefer to speak French for security reasons. For fear of revealing their ethnicity, the Congolese go to French, which helps preserve their anonymity. (See also: African French)

Kituba (or Munukutuba) is a Kikongo-based creole, understandable by the users of different dialects of Kikongo. This language is used by 50.35% of the Congolese population who live along the Congo-Océan railway line which connects Brazzaville to Pointe-Noire in the south of the country.

Lingala, the river language, is the language of President Denis Sassou-Nguesso, and is spoken mainly in the north and east of the country. This is the language which has grown most quickly in the past few years in the Congo.

Batekes form 16.9% of the population and are mostly found in the Plateaux Department, in the Cuvette-Ouest (where they are known as Mbéti and Tégué), Niari, Bouenza and the Pool region.

Ladi (pronunciation : Lari or Ladi) is the language mostly spoken in the Pool region and in the south of Brazzaville.

The dominant sign language is Nigerian Sign Language, influenced by local gestures and conventions.

== Writing system ==
Congolese languages are written using the international African alphabet. Nevertheless, in the Republic of Congo, the sometimes approximate French orthography is used for Congolese languages. This use of French spelling for Congolese languages is a legacy of French colonization. For example:

- Luango / Lwango → Loango
- Lubomo → Loubomo
- Luingi / Lwingi → Louingui
- Mbanza-Ndunga → Mbandza-Ndounga
- Kibosi → Kibossi
- Nge / Ngeye → Ngue / Ngueye
- Nkakamueka → Kakamoeka
- Buenza / Bwenza → Bouenza
- Buansa / Bwansa → Bouansa
- Lekumu → Lekoumou
- Likuala / Likwala → Likouala
- Weso → Ouesso

Etc.

However, the standardisation of Kikongo began before the 20th century.

== Notes and references ==
- Omer Massoumou et Ambroise Jean-Marc Queffélec, Le français en République du Congo sous l'ère pluripartiste (1991-2006), Paris, Éditions des archives contemporaines - Agence universitaire de la Francophonie, 2007, 451 p.
- Jean-Alexis Mfoutou, La langue française au Congo Brazzaville Manifestation de l'activité langagière des sujets parlants, Éd. L'Harmattan, 2007, ISBN 978-2-296-03348-1, 540 pages.
