= Jean Craighead George =

American writer (1919–2012)

Jean Carolyn Craighead George
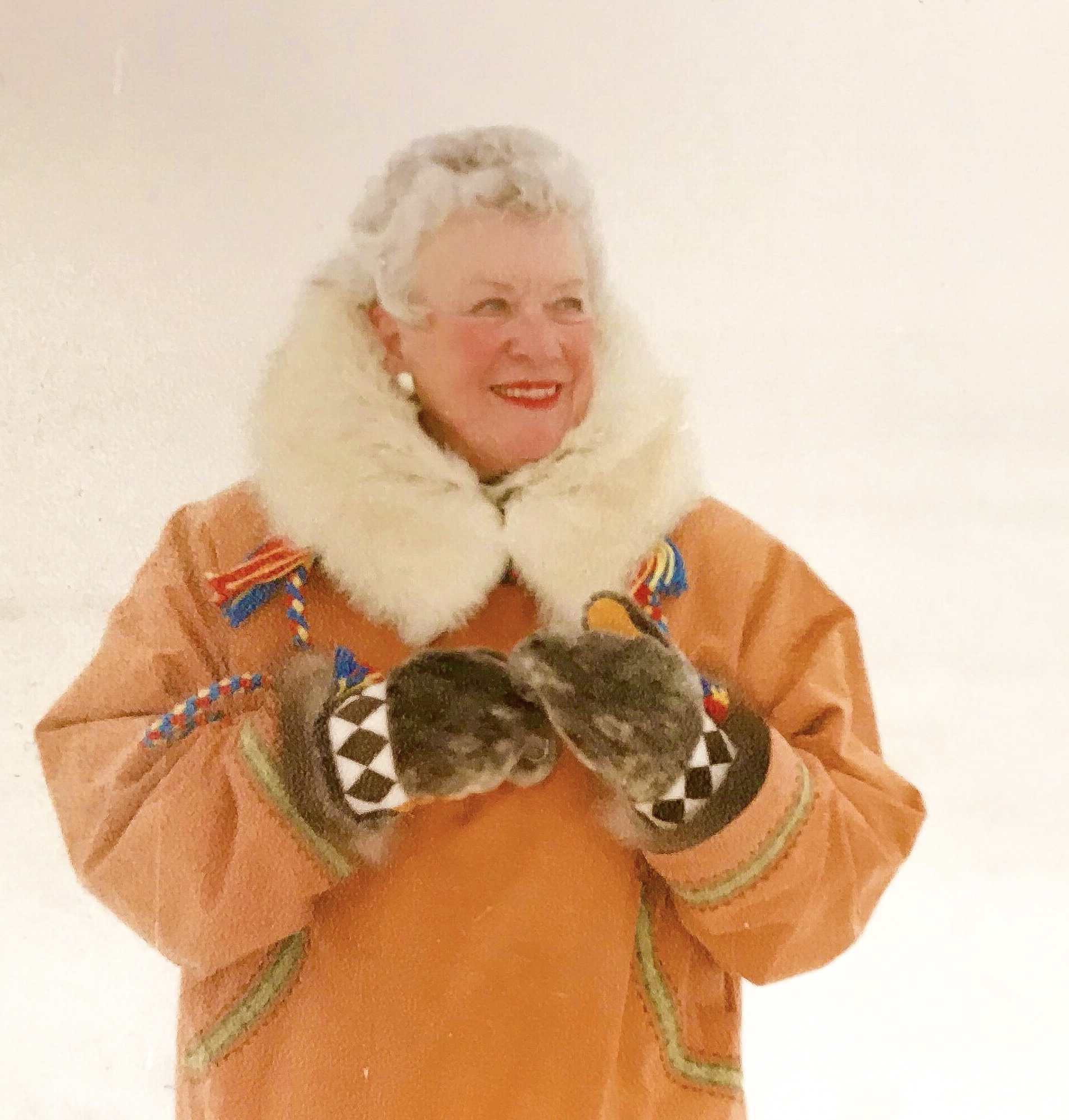
- Craighead George in Barrow, Alaska, 1994
- Born: July 2, 1919; Washington, D.C., U.S.
- Died: May 15, 2012 (aged 92); Valhalla, New York, U.S.
- Occupation: Writer
- Awards: Newbery Medal; 1973

Jean Carolyn Craighead George (July 2, 1919 – May 15, 2012) was an American writer of more than one hundred books for children and young adults, including the Newbery Medal-winning Julie of the Wolves and Newbery Honor My Side of the Mountain. Common themes in George's works are the environment and the natural world. Beside children's fiction, she wrote at least two guides to cooking with wild foods and one autobiography published 30 years before her death, Journey Inward.

For her lifetime contribution as a children's writer she was U.S. nominee for the biennial, international Hans Christian Andersen Award in 1964.

== Biography ==
Jean Carolyn Craighead was born on July 2, 1919, in Washington DC. She was raised in a family of naturalists. Her mother, Carolyn Johnson Craighead, father Frank Craighead Sr. as well as her two brothers Frank and John were students of nature. On weekends they camped in the woods near Washington, climbed trees to study owls, gathered edible plants, and made fish hooks from twigs. Her first pet was a turkey vulture. George centered her life around writing and nature.

George graduated in 1940 from Pennsylvania State University with degrees in both English and science. In the 1940s she was a member of the White House Press Corps and a reporter for The Washington Post. From 1969 to 1982 she was a writer and editor at Reader's Digest. She married John Lothar George in 1944, and they divorced in 1963. Her first novels were written in collaboration with him, and she provided the illustrations for them, done in black and white watercolors or inks. A later editor encouraged her to use other illustrators for her books.

Two of George's novels for children were My Side of the Mountain, a 1960 Newbery Medal runner-up, and its 1990 sequel On the Far Side of the Mountain. In 1991, George became the first winner of the Knickerbocker Award for Juvenile Literature from the School Library Media Section of the New York Library Association, which was presented to her for the "consistent superior quality" of her literary works.

The inspiration for Julie of the Wolves evolved from two specific events during a summer she spent studying wolves and tundra at the Arctic Research Laboratory of Barrow, Alaska. She explained, "One was a small girl walking the vast and lonesome tundra outside of Barrow; the other was a magnificent alpha male wolf, leader of a pack in Denali National Park. They haunted me for a year or more as did the words of one of the scientists at the lab: 'If there ever was any doubt in my mind that a man could live with the wolves, it is gone now. The wolves are truly gentlemen, highly social and affectionate.'" George won the annual Newbery Medal from the American Library Association for Julie, recognizing the year's "most distinguished contribution to American literature for children". She also won the Deutscher Jugendliteraturpreis in 1975 for its German-language edition Julie von den Wölfen, one of only two such double wins (with Scott O'Dell and Island of the Blue Dolphins).

George was a mother of three and a grandmother. The 2009 Dutton Children's Books Pocket Guide to the Outdoors is credited to "Jean Craighead George; with Twig C. George, John C. George, and T. Luke George". Daughter Twig C. George had previously written a few children's books about animals. Over the years, George kept one hundred and seventy-three pets, not including dogs and cats, in her home in Chappaqua, New York. "Most of these wild animals depart in autumn when the sun changes their behaviour and they feel the urge to migrate or go off alone. While they are with us, however, they become characters in my books, articles, and stories."

George died on May 15, 2012, at the age of 92 from complications of congestive heart failure, according to Twig George, at the Westchester Medical Center in Valhalla.

== Works ==
- 1948 Vulpes the Red Fox (American Woodland Tales series, with husband John L. George, illustrated by Jean George)
- 1949 Vison the Mink (American Woodland Tales series, with John L. George, illustrated by Jean George)
- 1950 Masked Prowler, The Story of a Raccoon (American Woodland Tales series, with John L. George, illustrated by Jean George)
- 1952 Meph, the Pet Skunk (American Woodland Tales series, with John L. George, illustrated by Jean George)
- 1954 Bubo, the Great Horned Owl (American Woodland Tales series, with John L. George, illustrated by Jean George)
- 1956 Dipper of Copper Creek (American Woodland Tales series, with John L. George, illustrated by Jean George)
- 1957 The Hole in the Tree (as by Jean George, writer and illustrator)
- 1958 Snow Tracks (as by Jean George, writer and illustrator)
- 1959 My Side of the Mountain (Mountain series #1, as by Jean Craighead George, writer and illustrator) (ISBN 0-14-034810-7)
- 1962 The Summer of the Falcon (illustrated by George)
- 1963 Red Robin, Fly Up! (picture book, photos by Ellan Young)
- 1964 Gull Number 737 (illustrated by George)
- 1964 Marvels and Mysteries of Our Animal World (Jean George editor and contributor)
- 1965 Spring Comes to the Ocean (illustrated by John Wilson)
- 1966 Hold Zero! (illustrated by George)
- 1967 The Moon of the Owls (The Thirteen Moons series #1, picture book illustrated by Jean Zallinger)
- 1967 The Moon of the Bears (The Thirteen Moons series #2, picture book illustrated by Mac Shepard)
- 1967 The Moon of the Salamanders (The Thirteen Moons series #3, picture book illustrated by John Kaufmann)
- 1967 The Moon of the Monarch Butterflies (The Thirteen Moons series #5, picture book illustrated by Murray Tinkelman)
- 1968 The Moon of the Fox Pups (The Thirteen Moons series #6, picture book illustrated by Kiyoaki Komoda)
- 1968 The Moon of the Wild Pigs (The Thirteen Moons series #7, picture book illustrated by Peter Parnall)
- 1968 The Moon of the Mountain Lions (The Thirteen Moons series #8, picture book illustrated by Winifred Lubell)
- 1968 Coyote in Manhattan (illustrated by John Kaufmann)
- 1969 The Moon of the Chickarees (The Thirteen Moons series #4, picture book illustrated by Don Rodell)
- 1969 The Moon of the Deer (The Thirteen Moons series #9, picture book illustrated by Jean Zallinger)
- 1969 The Moon of the Alligators (The Thirteen Moons series #10, picture book illustrated by Adrina Zanazanian)
- 1969 The Moon of the Gray Wolves (The Thirteen Moons series #11, picture book illustrated by Lorence Bjorklund)
- 1969 The Moon of the Winter Bird (The Thirteen Moons series #12, picture book illustrated by Kazue Mizumura)
- 1969 The Moon of the Moles (The Thirteen Moons series #13, picture book illustrated by Robert Levering)
- 1969 New York in Maps (listed as Toy Lasker and Jean George)
- 1970 Beastly Inventions: A Surprising Investigation Into Just How Smart Animals Really Are (illustrated by George)
- 1971 Who Really Killed Cock Robin? (Ecological Mystery #1)
- 1971 All Upon a Stone (picture book illustrated by Don Bolognese)
- 1972 Julie of the Wolves (Julie series #1, illustrated by John Schoenherr and Julek Heller in 1976) (ISBN 0-06-440058-1)
- 1972 Everglades Wildguide (Official National Park Handbook #143, illustrated by Betty Fraser) (ISBN 0-06-446194-7)
- 1974 All Upon a Sidewalk (picture book illustrated by Don Bolognese)
- 1975 Hook a Fish, Catch a Mountain
- 1976 Going to the Sun
- 1978 The Wentletrap Trap (picture book illustrated by Symeon Shimin)
- 1978 The Wounded Wolf (picture book illustrated by John Schoenherr)
- 1978 The American Walk Book
- 1979 River Rats, Inc.
- 1980 The Cry of the Crow (ISBN 0-06-440131-6)
- 1982 Journey Inward (autobiography)
- 1982 The Grizzly Bear With the Golden Ears (picture book illustrated by Tom Catania) (ISBN 0-06-021966-1)
- 1982 The Wild, Wild Cookbook (illustrated by Walter Kessell)
- 1983 One Day in the Desert (One Day series #1)
- 1983 The Talking Earth
- 1984 One Day in the Alpine Tundra (One Day series #2)
- 1985 How to Talk to Your Animals
- 1986 One Day in the Prairie (One Day series #3)
- 1986 How to Talk to Your Cat (chapter book, originally included in 1985's How to Talk to Your Animals, illustrated by George)
- 1986 How to Talk to Your Dog (chapter book, originally included in 1985's How to Talk to Your Animals, illustrated by George)
- 1987 Water Sky (illustrated by George)
- 1988 One Day in the Woods (One Day series #4)
- 1989 Shark Beneath the Reef
- 1990 One Day in the Tropical Rainforest (One Day series #5)
- 1990 On the Far Side of the Mountain (Mountain series #2, illustrated by George) (ISBN 0-14-131241-6)
- 1990 The Big Book for Peace (illustrated by Ted Rand)
- 1991 The Moon of the Mountain Lions (The Thirteen Moons #8, new edition of picture book illustrated by Ron Parker)
- 1991 The Moon of the Alligators (The Thirteen Moons #10, new edition of picture book illustrated by Michael Rothman)
- 1991 The Moon of the Gray Wolves (The Thirteen Moons #11, new edition of picture book illustrated by Sal Catalano)
- 1992 The Missing 'Gator of Gumbo Limbo (Ecological Mystery #2)
- 1992 The Moon of the Salamanders (The Thirteen Moons #3, new edition of picture book illustrated by Marlene Hill Werner)
- 1992 The Moon of the Chickarees (The Thirteen Moons #4, new edition of picture book illustrated by Don Rodell)
- 1992 The Moon of the Fox Pups (The Thirteen Moons #6, new edition of picture book illustrated by Norman Adams)
- 1992 The Moon of the Wild Pigs (The Thirteen Moons #7, new edition of picture book illustrated by Paul Mirocha)
- 1992 The Moon of the Deer (The Thirteen Moons #9, new edition of picture book illustrated by Sal Catalano)
- 1992 The Moon of the Winter Bird (The Thirteen Moons #12, new edition of picture book illustrated by Vincent Nasta)
- 1992 The Moon of the Moles (The Thirteen Moons #13, new edition of picture book illustrated by Michael Rothman)
- 1993 The Fire Bug Connection (Ecological Mystery #3) (ISBN 0-06-440474-9)
- 1993 The First Thanksgiving (picture book illustrated by Thomas Locker) (ISBN 0-698-11392-6)
- 1993 The Big Book for Our Planet (co-editor and contributor)
- 1993 Dear Rebecca, Winter is Here (picture book illustrated by Loretta Krupinski) (ISBN 0-06-443427-3)
- 1993 The Moon of the Owls (The Thirteen Moons #1, new edition of picture book illustrated by Wendell Minor)
- 1993 The Moon of the Bears (The Thirteen Moons #2, new edition of picture book illustrated by Ron Parker)
- 1993 The Moon of the Monarch Butterflies (The Thirteen Moons #5, new edition of picture book illustrated by Kam Mak)
- 1994 Julie (Julie series #2) (ISBN 0-06-440573-7)
- 1994 Animals Who Have Won Our Hearts (illustrated by Christine Herman Merrill)
- 1995 Everglades (picture book illustrated by Wendell Minor) (ISBN 0-06-446194-7)
- 1995 There's an Owl in the Shower
- 1995 Acorn Pancakes, Dandelion Salad and 38 Other Wild Recipes (abridgement of 1982's The Wild, Wild Cookbook, illustrated by Paul Mirocha)
- 1995 To Climb a Waterfall (picture book illustrated by Thomas Locker)
- 1996 The Tarantula in My Purse and 172 Other Wild Pets (ISBN 0-06-446201-3)
- 1996 The Case of the Missing Cutthroats, An Ecological Mystery #4 (reissue of 1975's "Hook a Fish, Catch a Mountain")
- 1997 Julie's Wolf Pack (Julie series #3) (ISBN 0-06-027406-9)
- 1997 Look to the North, A Wolf Pup Diary (picture book illustrated by Lucia Washburn) (ISBN 0-06-023641-8)
- 1997 Arctic Son (picture book illustrated by Wendell Minor)
- 1998 Dear Katie, the Volcano is a Girl (picture book illustrated by Daniel Powers) (ISBN 0-7868-0314-2)
- 1998 Giraffe Trouble (picture book illustrated by Anna Vojtech) (ISBN 0-7868-5066-3)
- 1998 Elephant Walk (picture book illustrated by Anna Vojtech)
- 1998 Gorilla Gang (picture book illustrated by Stacey Schuett)
- 1998 Rhino Romp (picture book illustrated by Stacey Schuett)
- 1999 Frightful's Mountain (Mountain series #3, illustrated by George) (ISBN 0-525-46166-3)
- 1999 Morning, Noon, and Night (picture book illustrated by Wendell Minor)
- 1999 Incredible Animal Adventures (reissue of 1994's Animals Who Have Won Our Hearts, illustrated by Donna Diamond)
- 1999 Snow Bear (picture book illustrated by Wendell Minor)
- 2000 How to Talk to Your Cat (picture book illustrated by Paul Meisel, abridged from 1986's chapter book of same title)
- 2000 How to Talk to Your Dog (picture book illustrated by Paul Meisel, abridged from 1986's chapter book of same title)
- 2001 Nutik, the Wolf Pup (Julie series #4, picture book illustrated by Ted Rand) ISBN 0-06-028164-2)
- 2001 Nutik and Amaroq Play Ball (Julie series #5, picture book illustrated by Ted Rand) (ISBN 0-06-028166-9)
- 2001 Autumn Moon (Seasons of the Moon #1, compilation of The Thirteen Moons books #9, 10, and 11)
- 2001 Winter Moon (Seasons of the Moon #2, compilation of The Thirteen Moons books #12, 13, 1, and 2)
- 2002 Cliff Hanger (Outdoor Adventures series #1, picture book illustrated by Wendell Minor) (ISBN 0-06-000260-3)
- 2002 Frightful's Daughter (Mountain series #4, picture book illustrated by Daniel San Souci)
- 2002 Tree Castle Island (illustrated by George)
- 2002 Spring Moon (Seasons of the Moon #3, compilation of The Thirteen Moons books #3, 4, and 5)
- 2002 Summer Moon (Seasons of the Moon #4, compilation of The Thirteen Moons books #6, 7, and 8)
- 2003 Fire Storm (Outdoors Adventures series #2, picture book illustrated by Wendell Minor) (ISBN 0-06-000263-8)
- 2004 Snowboard Twist (Outdoors Adventures series #3, picture book illustrated by Wendell Minor)
- 2004 Charlie's Raven
- 2006 Luck, the Story of a Sandhill Crane (picture book illustrated by Wendell Minor)
- 2007 Frightful's Daughter Meets the Baron Weasel (Mountain series #5, picture book illustrated by Daniel San Souci)
- 2008 Goose and Duck (picture book illustrated by Priscilla Lamont)
- 2008 The Wolves are Back (picture book illustrated by Wendell Minor)
- 2009 The Cats of Roxville Station (illustrated by Tom Pohrt)
- 2009 Pocket Guide to the Outdoors (Dutton Children's Books), with Twig C. George, John C. George, and T. Luke George; cover says "Based on My Side of the Mountain"
- 2009 The Last Polar Bear (picture book illustrated by Wendell Minor)
- 2009 The Buffalo Are Back (picture book illustrated by Wendell Minor)
- 2010 The Eagles Are Back (picture book illustrated by Wendell Minor)
- 2010 A Special Gift for Grammy (picture book illustrated by Steve Johnson)
- 2014 Ice Whale
- 2014 Galapagos George (picture book illustrated by Wendell Minor)
- 2018 Shadow: The Cougar of Flat Creek (picture book illustrated by John D. Dawson) - available via Jean's website
- 2021 Crowbar: The Smartest Bird in the World (picture book illustrated by Wendell Minor)
