= Linda Carroll =

American writer

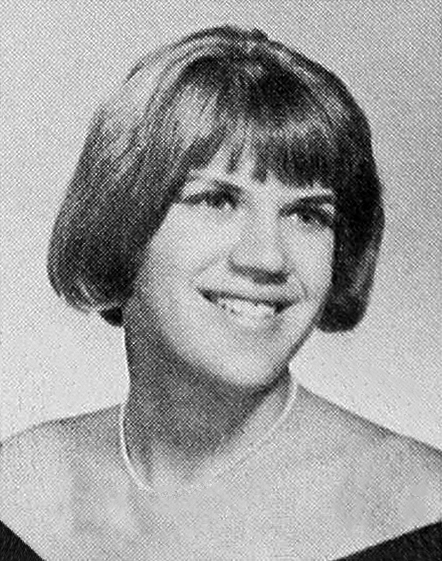
- High school yearbook portrait, 1962
- Born: Linda Anne Risi; April 7, 1944 (age 82); San Francisco, California, U.S.
- Education: University of Oregon (B.A., 1971); Oregon State University (M.S., 1978)
- Occupations: Writer, therapist, counselor
- Years active: 1980–present
- Spouses: Hank Harrison (m. 1963; div. 1970); Frank Rodríguez (m. 1970; div. 1972); Tim Barraud (m. 1972)
- Children: 5, including Courtney Love
- Parent: Paula Fox (mother)
- Relatives: Frances Bean Cobain (granddaughter); Paul Hervey Fox (grandfather)

Linda Carroll (born Linda Anne Risi; April 7, 1944) is an American writer, marriage counselor, and family therapist. She is also the mother of Courtney Love. Carroll received national attention in 1993 when one of her patients, the fugitive Katherine Ann Power, turned herself in to authorities after spending twenty-three years eluding police. Carroll is best known professionally as a couples therapist and as an author of three books, the latest being Love Cycles: The Five Essential Stages of Lasting Love, in 2014.

Born and raised in San Francisco, Linda Carroll now lives in Corvallis, Oregon, with her veterinarian husband, Tim Barraud. She is the mother of singer and musician Courtney Love, and the daughter of novelist Paula Fox.

== Biography ==
Carroll was born on April 7, 1944, in San Francisco, California, to writer Paula Fox, who was 20 years old at the time. Carroll was conceived of a short-lived relationship between Fox and an unnamed man. Fox lived under the roof of acting coach Stella Adler at the time, as did then unknown actor Marlon Brando. There have been persistent rumors that Brando was in fact Carroll's father, although neither Brando nor Fox ever commented on the matter. Carroll did not meet her birth mother until later in life. Carroll's maternal grandfather was screenwriter Paul Hervey Fox, and her grandmother, Elsie Fox (née de Sola) was a Cuban writer.

Fox gave Carroll up for adoption at birth. She was adopted by optician Emil "Jack" and Louella Risi, a Catholic family of part Italian descent, and raised in the Pacific Heights neighborhood of San Francisco. Later in life, she took the surname Carroll following the death of her friend Judy Carroll. Linda graduated from high school in 1961.

She married writer and publisher Hank Harrison in 1963 in Reno, Nevada and gave birth to daughter Courtney Michelle Harrison on July 9, 1964. Within years of Courtney's birth, both Carroll's adoptive parents died. She divorced Harrison after 18 months of marriage, alleging that he had given her the drug LSD, and brought her daughter Courtney with her to Marcola, Oregon. She had two other daughters with her second husband, Frank Rodríguez.

After finishing her bachelor's degree in Oregon in the 1970s, she moved to New Zealand. She returned to Oregon in the 1980s, received a master's degree in counseling, and began practicing as a therapist. Carroll and her veterinarian husband, Tim Barraud, began to teach a couples course based on the Imago work of Harville Hendrix, the PAIRS training of Dr. Lori Gordon, and their own insights, study, and practices.

As an adult, Carroll found that her birth mother is the novelist Paula Fox (her grandmother was screenwriter Elsie Fox). In 2006, her memoir Her Mother's Daughter: A Memoir of the Mother I Never Knew and of My Daughter, Courtney Love, was published by Doubleday. Love's agent called the book a work of "vicious and greedy fiction", and said, "We find it astonishing that any mother should write such a book. This is especially true in the case of Ms Carroll, who abandoned her daughter when she was a seven-year-old and whom Ms Love thus barely knows at all." Linda Carroll, however, contends in her memoir that she left Courtney with a friend for just two months at age nine while she was looking for a home in New Zealand and that Courtney remained with her until she emancipated herself at age 16. Linda Carroll and Courtney became estranged.

"Far from a celebrity memoir, Her Mother's Daughter," Booklist, the review journal of the American Library Association wrote, "Despite the suggestive subtitle, Carroll's memoir is far less tell-all than it is her personal recollections of growing up feeling alienated from her adoptive family, her peers, and her religion. ... A thoughtful memoir of one woman's coming-of-age in the turbulent 1960s and 1970s."

As of 2015, Carroll has five children and ten grandchildren.

== Works ==
- Her Mother's Daughter: A Memoir of the Mother I Never Knew and of My Daughter, Courtney Love. Doubleday. 2006. ISBN 978-0-3855-1247-3.
- Remember Who You Are: Seven Stages on a Woman's Journey of Spirit. Conari Press. 2008. ISBN 978-1-5732-4367-4.
- Love Cycles: The Five Essential Stages of Lasting Love. New World Library. 2014. ISBN 978-1-6086-8300-0.
