= Masked Prowler, The Story of a Raccoon =

1950 novel by Jean Craighead George

- First edition (publ. E. P. Dutton)
- Language: English
- Publisher: E. P. Dutton
- Publication date: 1950
- LC Class: QL795.R15 G4

Masked Prowler, The Story of a Raccoon (1950) is a children's novel written by John and Jean George and illustrated by Jean George, more famously known by her later novels as Jean Craighead George.

This is the chronicle of Procyon, from his birth, mother's lessons, and adventures with his littermates, to his solitary adolescence, mating, hibernation, and encounters with humans. The humans are secondary characters, mainly Minnesota farmers, hunters, and storytellers, who help put Procyon's history in perspective. Even more so than with their first novel, Vulpes, the Red Fox, the Georges do not present an anthropomorphic world; the names of the animal characters are taken from their Latin scientific names: e.g., the raccoon is Procyon lotor, and Procyon's mate here is named Lotor. Only the humans are given moral traits (the good farmer Gib and his hired hand, Joe, vs. the Luke brothers who hunt animals out of season); the animals are presented realistically, without sentimentality, simply struggling to survive. As such, it is an early example of xenofictive ecological fiction.
