= Grand Finale (film) =

1936 film

- Directed by: Ivar Campbell
- Written by: Vera Allinson; Paul Hervey Fox
- Produced by: Anthony Havelock-Allan
- Starring: Mary Glynne; Guy Newall
- Cinematography: Ernest Palmer
- Production company: British and Dominions
- Distributed by: Paramount British Pictures
- Release date: September 1936
- Running time: 71 minutes
- Country: United Kingdom
- Language: English

Grand Finale (also known as Finale) is a 1936 British comedy film directed by Ivar Campbell. It was written by Vera Allinson and Paul Hervey Fox, and made at Shepperton Studios as a quota quickie for distribution by Paramount Pictures.

== Preservation status ==
The British Film Institute National Archive holds a collection of ephemera and stills but no film or video materials.

== Plot ==
Young journalist Peter Trench falls in love with model Pat Mainwaring, who is shortly to wed pompous businessman Sir Thomas Portland. Unable to convince her to change her plans, he confides in his father Hugo, who was a co-respondent when Portland divorced Lina, his first wife. Hugo hatches a plan to get Portland interested in Lina again, which succeeds.

== Cast ==
- Mary Glynne as Lina Parsons
- Guy Newall as Hugo Trench
- Eric Cowley as Sir Thomas Portland
- Glen Alyn as Pat Mainwaring
- Douglas Rhodes as Peter Trench
- Kim Peacock as editor

== Reception ==
The Monthly Film Bulletin wrote: "The film is complicated and not very funny. The dialogue drags out the situations and is not good. The acting, for the most part, does not surmount the handicaps imposed by the story and the dialogue."

Kine Weekly wrote: "The story displayed in this picture still has its niche on the stage, but it is far too dependent on dialogue and theatrical tricks and characters ever to be translated into successful screen entertainment. The film may for quota purposes in small halls, but here its market abruptly ends."
