= Frank and John Craighead =

American naturalist and conversationist duo

- Born: August 14, 1916; Washington, D.C., U.S.
- Died: Frank: October 21, 2001 (aged 85); Jackson, Wyoming, U.S. John: September 18, 2016 (aged 100); Missoula, Montana, U.S.
- Education: University of Michigan
- Occupations: Conservation, falconry, grizzly bear biology
- Years active: 1934–1976

Frank Cooper Craighead Jr. (August 14, 1916 – October 21, 2001) and John Johnson Craighead (August 14, 1916 – September 18, 2016), twin brothers, were American conservationists, naturalists, and researchers who made important contributions to the studies of falconry and grizzly bear biology. The brothers were born in Washington, D.C., where both graduated from Western High School in 1935. The brothers began collecting and identifying animals and plants they found alongside the Potomac and soon expanded their interests to birds and hawks. They traveled west in 1934 to begin studying falconry. After World War II, during which they were employed as survival trainers, they each married and resumed their work in falconry. During the 1950s, the Craighead brothers expanded their work to other animals, including many species living in and around Yellowstone, and eventually separated.

In 1959 their careers merged again, this time to begin a 12-year study of grizzly bears in Yellowstone since the animals were considered threatened by increased human activity. However, a 1971 disagreement with the National Park Service ended their Yellowstone studies. Fortunately, their work continued elsewhere in Montana, including the Scapegoat Wilderness. After 1976, their work was mostly confined to field guides and educating the public about environmentalism. Their work in field ecology continued until Frank's death in 2001 from Parkinson's disease.

In 1998, the National Audubon Society named the brothers among the top 100 conservationists of the 20th century. John won the Wildlife Society's Aldo Leopold Memorial Award in the same year.

== Early life ==
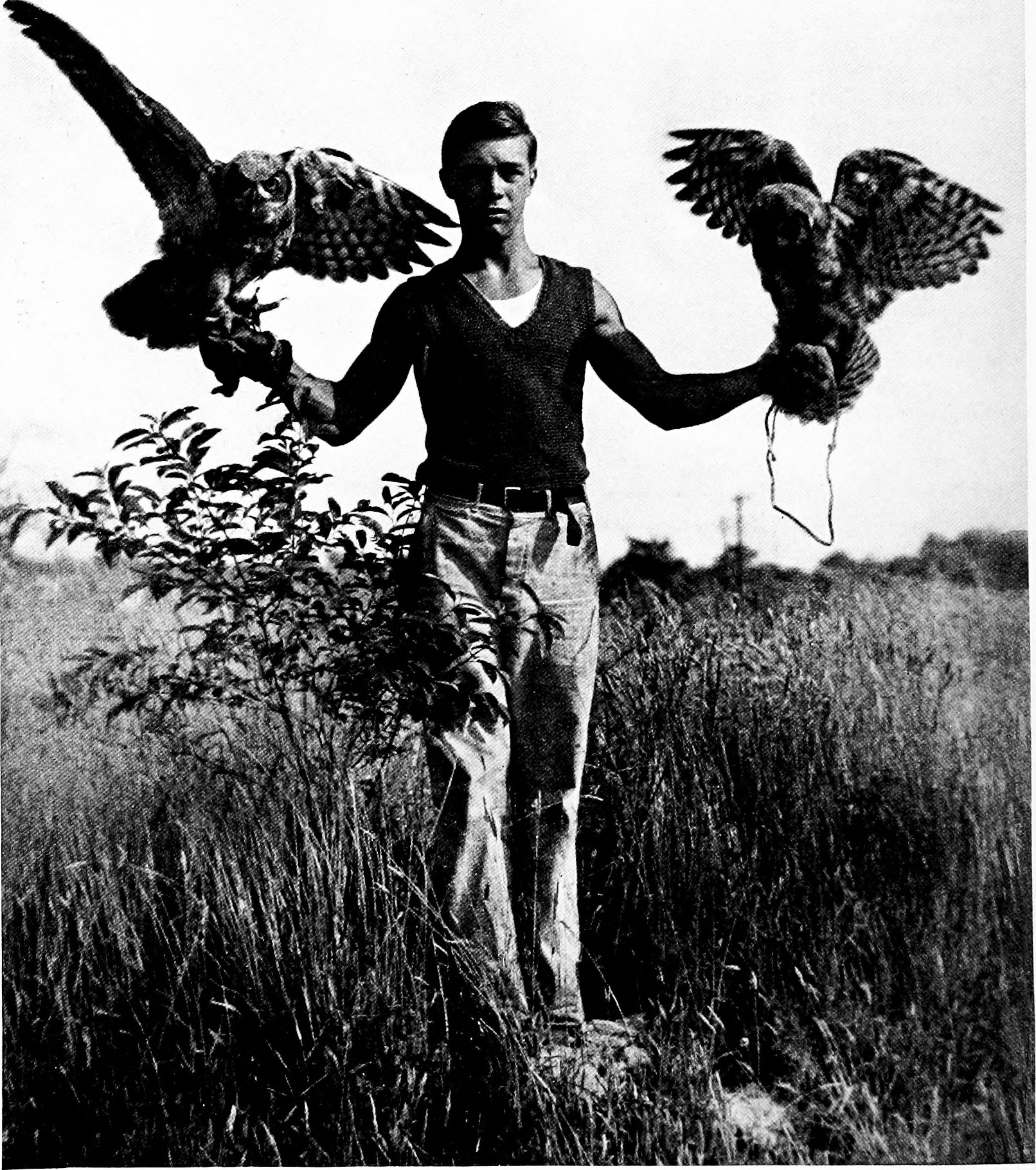
Frank training a pair of great horned owls

Frank Cooper Craighead and John Johnson Craighead were born in Washington, D.C., on August 14, 1916. Their father, Frank Craighead Sr., was an environmentalist and founder of the modern environmentalist Craighead family. Their mother, Carolyn Jackson Craighead, was a biologist technician. Their sister, Jean Craighead George, wrote books with nature and environmental themes for children and young adults, including the award-winning books My Side of the Mountain (a Newbery Honor Book) and Julie of the Wolves (the 1973 Newbery Award winner) . The twin brothers, almost identical to one another, spent much of their time collecting animals and plants along the banks of the Potomac while out of school, but their breakthrough with wildlife came in 1927, when they raised a baby owl at their home. Their interest in hawks and owls grew. By the early 1930s, they regularly visited hawk and owl nests all along the Potomac. Eventually, after high school, they moved to Pennsylvania and attended Pennsylvania State University, graduating with science degrees in 1939.

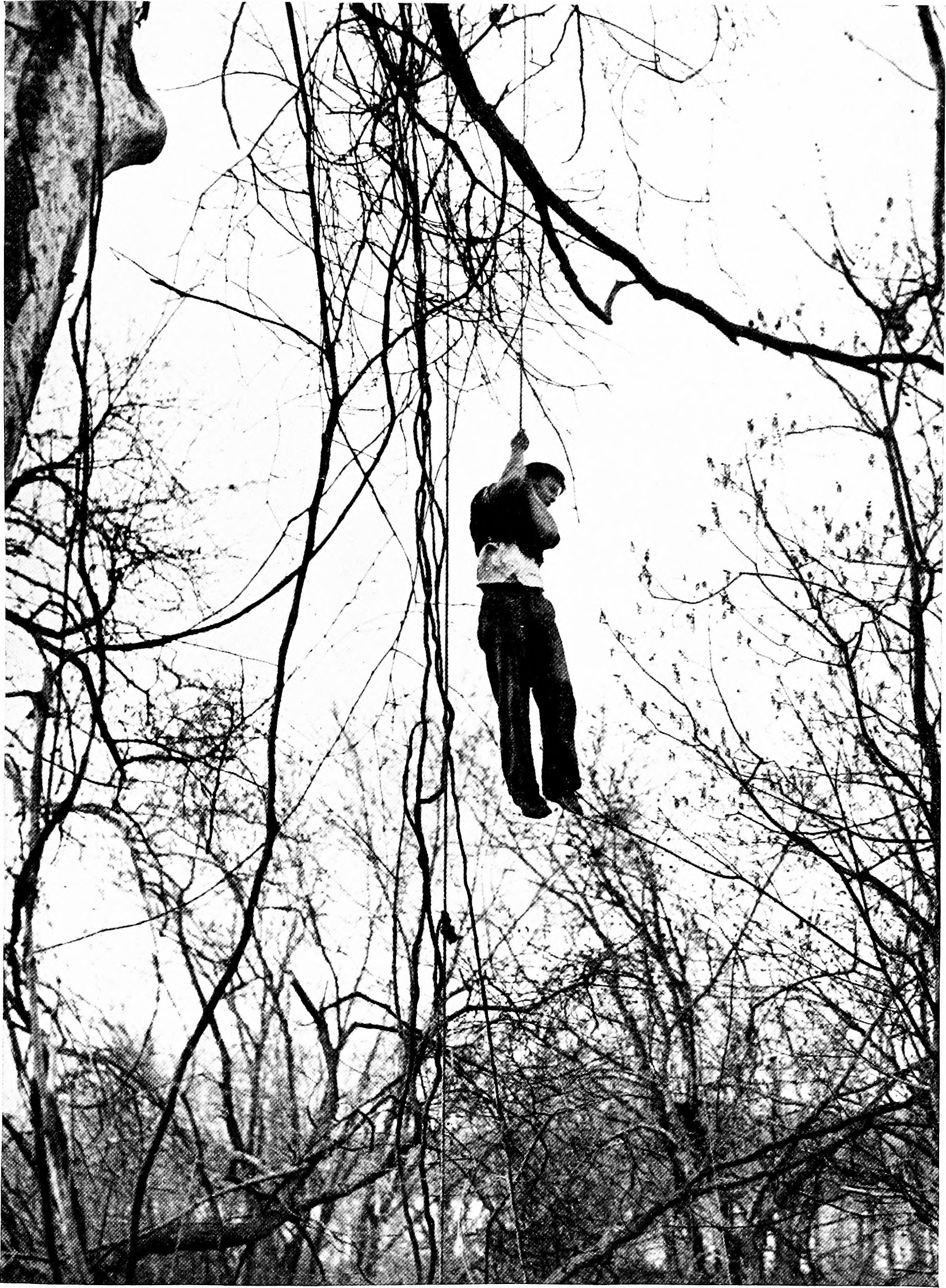
John descending from photographing birds

At age 20, the brothers wrote their first article for National Geographic Society, published in the July 1937 issue, Adventures with Birds of Prey. Between 1937 and 1976, they wrote a total of 14 articles for the magazine. During World War II, R. S. Dharmakumarsinhji, an Indian prince living in Bhavnagar who was impressed by the Craigheads' articles invited the brothers to visit India. There, they learned about Indian ways of life and documented falconry in India. The brothers returned home in 1942, as they missed home and their falconry studies in America. They also became deeply opposed to killing animals after participating in Indian hunts during their stay. In America, the brothers continued survival training until 1950. In 1940, both brothers received two degrees from the University of Michigan: their master's of science degrees in 1949 and Ph.D.s in wildlife management in 1949. They wrote their dissertations on raptors. The dissertation was titled “Hawks, Owls and Wildlife." During this time, they researched wildlife in Wyoming and Montana, writing Cloud Gardens in the Tetons in 1948 and Wildlife Adventuring in Jackson Hole in 1956.

== Later career ==
In 1950, Frank and John worked as survival consultants to the Strategic Air Command, and in 1951 they organized survival training schools for the Air Force at Mountain Home and McCall, Idaho. From 1953 to 1955, Frank conducted classified defense research. His log home in Moose wasn't winterized, so the family lived in various places around the Jackson Hole valley, including stays on the Murie Ranch, the old Budge house in Wilson, and a house in Jackson. Frank and John went their separate ways in the early 1950s, when John accepted a permanent position with the University of Montana to lead the Montana Cooperative Wildlife Research Unit and Frank decided to work outside of academia. From 1955 to 1957, he managed the Desert Game Range outside Las Vegas, Nevada, for the USFWS. This was the era of nuclear testing, and Frank had great concerns about the effects of radiation. However, his efforts to measure and document radiation levels on the refuge were not encouraged by the federal government.

=== Grizzly bears ===
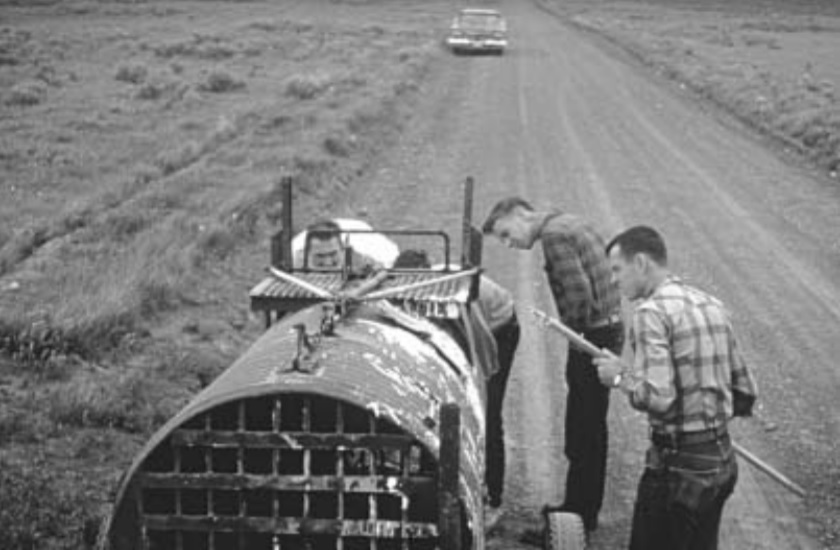
The Craigheads trap a grizzly bear in Yellowstone, 1961

In 1959, Frank and John's careers merged again. At the request of Yellowstone National Park, they began a 12-year study of grizzly bears. Frank would drive from Pennsylvania, arriving in Yellowstone early in the spring and staying until late in the fall when the bears denned. Esther, Frank's wife, waited until the kids were out of school and then drove to Moose for the summer. In late August, she would load up the station wagon and drive back to Boiling Springs. By 1966, the long cross-country drives had become too much. Frank added indoor plumbing to his cabin on Antelope Flats, and he and Esther moved to Moose, Wyoming permanently. The brothers became famous in radio tracking and studying the grizzlies and black bears, by satellite, pioneered tranquilization, and studied the negative effects of grizzlies wandering outside the park boundaries. The Craigheads tagged 30 grizzlies in their first year and 37 in their second. Eventually, over 600 bears were tagged with radio transmitters and studied. The brothers were often treed or chased by bears, but no injuries occurred. They went through the tragedy of seeing a bear die after being tagged in 1963. The fact that many bears died at age five or six after human encounters persuaded the Craigheads to ask park officials to enforce animal rules more strictly.

In 1971, the Park Service planned to erase human effect on the park by closing the artificial food supplies (dumps) that the grizzlies depended on, which resulted in more aggressive bears being killed after many fatal maulings in the 1970s. This action was prompted by the events of August 1967, during which two women were mauled to death by bears in the park. The Craigheads were barred from doing any more work in the park by 1971 for speaking against this and for rejecting a new clause in their work contract that required them to gain approval from the National Park Service before doing any further work. However, they continued to do bear research in Montana until the 1980s.

== Writing the National Wild & Scenic River Act ==
The brothers, especially Frank, were deeply concerned about preserving the West's rivers. After educating the public about how vital rivers were for water, recreation and fishing, they created the Craighead Environmental Research Institute in 1955 for the "protection and study of wildlife and wilderness." The Institute paved the way for clean water protection and President Johnson signing the National Wild and Scenic Rivers bill of 1965. The Craigheads ended their active research after Frank's log cabin in Moose burned down in 1978.

== Personal lives ==
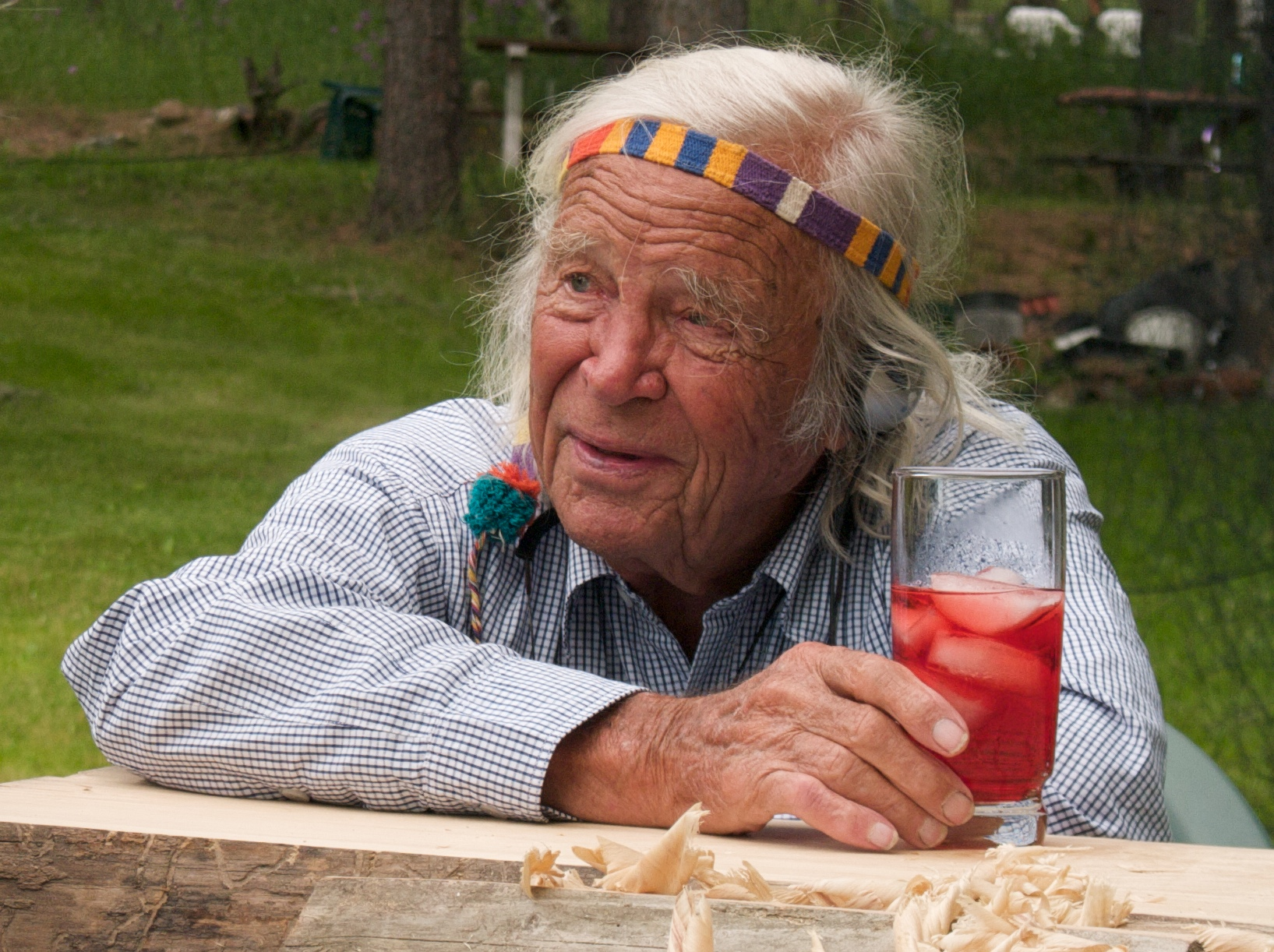
John in Missoula, 2008

Frank married Esther Craighead in 1945. Meanwhile, John had married Margaret Smith, a mountain climber and daughter of a Grand Teton National Park ranger. Frank and Esther, and John and Margaret built identical log cabins on their property in Moose, and began families. John and Margaret had a son named Johnny. While Frank was completing his various field studies during the late 1940s and early 1950s, he and Esther had three children - Lance, Charlie, and Jana. They were all born in Jackson at the old log cabin.

Frank's health deteriorated due to Parkinson's disease he had been diagnosed with in 1987, during his second marriage and seven years after Esther died, and he died in 2001 at the age of 85. The Craighead institute has offices in both Bozeman and Moose and is run by Frank's son Lance. Frank's papers are now held by the library at Montana State University.

John Craighead lived in Missoula, Montana. He turned 100 in August 2016. He died in South Missoula a little over a month later, on September 18, 2016.

== Selected publications ==
- Track of the Grizzly, Frank Craighead, 1982
- How to Survive on Land and Sea (Physical Education), 1984
- Life with an Indian Prince, 1940–41
- Hawks, Owls and Wildlife, 1958
