= Julie (George novel) =

1994 novel by Jean Craighead George

- First edition
- Author: Jean Craighead George
- Illustrator: Wendell Minor
- Series: Julie of the Wolves
- Genre: Children's novel
- Publisher: HarperCollins
- Publication date: 1994
- Publication place: United States
- Media type: Print (hardcover)
- Pages: 226 pp
- ISBN: 0-06-023528-4
- OCLC: 28798256
- LC Class: PZ7.G2933 Ju 1994
- Preceded by: Julie of the Wolves
- Followed by: Julie's Wolf Pack

Julie is a children's novel by Jean Craighead George, published in 1994, about a young Iñupiaq girl experiencing the changes forced upon her culture from outside. It is the second book in a trilogy by George, after Julie of the Wolves (1973) and before Julie's Wolf Pack (1997).

== Background ==
Jean Craighead George said that her son, Craig, had moved to Barrow, Alaska, and that Jean had visited Craig and his family almost every year, learning about the people and the country from Craig and his Inuit friends. Eventually, she felt compelled to write a sequel to Julie of the Wolves.

== Plot summary ==
The story begins ten minutes after the last book ends and is divided into three parts: Kapugen, the Hunter; Amy, the Wolf Pup; Miyax, the Young Woman.

Julie has spent many months in the wilderness. During that time, she survived by relying on her culture's traditions and being accepted by a pack of wolves. However, she has now decided to return to human society and her father's home.

She's is not prepared for all the changes that have occurred, as her father has given up many of the old ways. Most upsetting is that he is willing to shoot wolves in order to protect the village's muskox herd.

Julie returns to the wolf pack and witnesses a new cub, whom she names Amy after her pen pal in San Francisco. Throughout the story, Julie learns to reconcile the old ways with the new, while struggling to protect her wolf pack.

== Reception ==
Hazel Rochman of The New York Times wrote, "As in the first book, what's glorious is the lyrical nature writing."
