= Adam Giede Böving =

Danish-American entomologist

- Born: 1869; Vendsyssel, Denmark
- Died: 1957 (aged 87–88); Washington, D. C.
- Citizenship: Danish; American
- Education: University of Copenhagen
- Scientific career
- Fields: Entomology
- Workplaces: University of Copenhagen Zoological Museum; Smithsonian Institution

Adam Giede Böving (July 31, 1869 – March 16, 1957) was a Danish-American entomologist and zoologist. He was a specialist in the study of the larvae of the order Coleoptera and the author of a series of descriptions on their early stages of development.

== Biography ==
Adam Böving was born at Sæby in Vendsyssel, Denmark. He was the eldest child of Niels Orten Mathias Bøving (1838-1923) and Louise Augustine Ottilia (Gjede) Bøving (1838-99. His father was a school headmaster and later church vicar. After matriculation from Aalborg University, he continued his studies of zoology at the University of Copenhagen where he earned his Ph.D. in 1888. From 1902 to 1903 he worked as assistant curator of entomology in the University of Copenhagen Zoological Museum of Copenhagen.

He immigrated to the United States in 1913 to become a member of the Bureau of Entomology, a division of United States Department of Agriculture (USDA). While working there he became a specialist in the larvae of Coleoptera. From 1939 he was a research associate of the Smithsonian Institution, and retired from USDA in 1945. He wrote and illustrated a number of books principally describing early stages of Coleoptera development. He became an honorary member of the Entomological Society of America in 1939 and a member of the Academy of Sciences in 1948. He was president 1923-24 of the Entomological Society of Washington and from 1924 to 1932 served as vice president of the Washington Academy of Science.

== Selected works ==
- Natural History of the Larvae of Donaciinae (1910)
- Coleoptera Papers (1913)
- Larvae of North American Beetles of the Family Cleridae (1920) with A. B. Champlain
- Biology of Embaphion Muricatum (1921) with Joseph Sanford Wade
- The Pacific Flathead Borer (1929) with H. E. Burke
- Beetle Larvae of the Subfamily Galerucinae (1929)
- An Illustrated Synopsis of the Principal Larval Forms of the Order Coleoptera (1931) with Frank C. Craighead, Sr.
