= Julie of the Wolves =

1972 novel by Jean Craighead George

- First edition cover
- Author: Jean Craighead George
- Illustrator: John Schoenherr; Julek Heller (1976, UK)
- Cover artist: Schoenherr
- Series: Julie of the Wolves
- Genre: Children's novel, survival fiction
- Publisher: Harper & Row
- Publication date: 1972
- Publication place: United States
- Media type: Print (hardcover)
- Pages: 170 pp (first ed.)
- ISBN: 0-06-021943-2
- OCLC: 578045
- LC Class: PZ7.G2933 Ju
- Followed by: Julie

Julie of the Wolves is a children's novel by Jean Craighead George, published by Harper in 1972 with illustrations by John Schoenherr. Set on the Alaska North Slope, it features a young Inuk girl experiencing the changes forced upon her culture from outside. George wrote two sequels that were originally illustrated by Wendell Minor: Julie (Note: Julie's Choice in the UK) (1994), which starts 10 minutes after the first book ends, and Julie's Wolf Pack (1997), which is told from the viewpoint of the wolves.

== Background ==
In 1971, Jean Craighead George and her son Luke went on a trip to Barrow, Alaska, to do research on wolves for an article for Reader's Digest. As they flew into the Barrow airport, she and her son spotted a young Inuk girl on the tundra, whom her son said "looked awfully little to be out there by herself".

At the Barrow Arctic Research Lab, George observed scientists who were studying wolves and attempting to break their communication code. She allegedly witnessed a man bite the wolf on the top of its nose and communicate with it in soft whimpers, and "the incident stayed with George". George herself successfully communicated with a female wolf. Upon remembering the Inuk girl walking by herself on the tundra that she and her son Luke saw on their way to Barrow, she decided to write a book about a young girl surviving on her own in the tundra by communicating with wolves. The character of Miyax/Julie is based on an Inuk woman named Julia Sebevan, who taught George "about the old ways of the Inuits [sic]".

In the process of writing the novel, George went through three drafts, and used numerous titles including "The Voice of the Wolf"; "Wolf! Wolf?"; "Wolf Girl"; "The Cry of the Wolf"; and "Wolf Song".

Readers and students communicated to George their desire to read more about Julie "several years ago", but George felt that she "did not know enough about the Eskimo culture". It was only after her son, Craig, moved to Alaska that George "felt ready" to write the sequel Julie. Julie's Wolf Pack was written only after George had learned more about the relationships of wolves in a pack.

The story has three parts: first her present situation (Amaroq, the Wolf), then a flashback (Miyax, the Girl), and finally a return to the present (Kapugen, the Hunter).

== Plot summary ==
Julie/Miyax (My-yax) is an Inuk girl torn between modern Alaska and the old Inuit tradition. After her mother's death, Miyax is raised by her father, Kapugen (Kah-Pue-Jen). In his care, Miyax becomes an intelligent and observant girl at one with the Arctic tundra. Miyax goes to live with her great-aunt Martha, a distant and cold woman, after Martha obtains paperwork showing that Miyax must attend school because she is nine years old. Her father is conscripted and reluctantly tells her to go with Martha. Soon after, her father goes out on a seal hunt and does not return. Search parties find four pieces of his boat washed ashore, but there is no sign of him. He is presumed dead.

As an orphan, Miyax is never more than an unwanted guest in Martha's house. So at age 13, Miyax accepts a marriage to a boy named Daniel, as it will allow her to leave her aunt’s house. However, Miyax soon realizes that life with Daniel is no better, if not worse than her life with Martha. Daniel has an unspecified type of intellectual disability. After being mercilessly teased by his friends about it, he becomes abusive towards Miyax and attempts to sexually assault her. Caught in an unbearable situation, Miyax runs away in the hope of being able to stay with her pen-pal in San Francisco, California.

Miyax realizes that she has no way of reaching her friend and finds herself lost in the Arctic wild with only her own strength and knowledge between her and death. Miyax happens upon a wolf pack and is able to coexist with them. She learns to communicate with the wolves to receive food and water, and over time, they become like family. When Miyax finds a way to return to her old Inuit way of life, she is torn between the choice of staying with the wolves or going back to her home.

== Reception ==
The book was awarded the Newbery Medal in 1973, and was a nominee under the Children's Books category in the 1973 National Book Awards. Mary Ellen Halvorson describes the book as "uniquely sensitive" and "wonderfully educational" in a review for The Prescott Courier. The book also won the 1975 German Youth Literature Award. In a retrospective essay about the Newbery Medal-winning books from 1966 to 1975, children's author John Rowe Townsend wrote, "The details of the girl's relationship with the wolves are totally absorbing, but as a story the book seems to me to be slightly deficient."

The inclusion of Julie of the Wolves in elementary school reading lists has been challenged several times due to parental concerns regarding the attempted rape of the main character. One of these incidents occurred in March 1996, when the book was removed from the sixth grade reading list in Pulaski Township, Pennsylvania, at the behest of parents who "complained of a graphic marital rape scene in the book". It is number 32 on the American Library Association list of the 100 Most Frequently Challenged Books of 1990–1999.

2003 edition cover

In 2004, Martha Stackhouse, an Iñupiaq teacher, reviewed the book. Stackhouse points out the many inaccuracies in the book's portrayal of Iñupiat life, culture and language. She also criticizes the author's harmful emphasis on exemplifying thin body types among girls. Her review was published on the Alaska Native Knowledge Network and subsequently republished by Debbie Reese's American Indians in Children's Literature with the title "Not Recommended".

== Publication history ==
- 1972, USA, Harper and Row, ISBN 0-06-021943-2, Pub date 1972, Hardcover
- 1974, USA, HarperCollins, ISBN 0-06-440058-1, Pub date February 10, 1974, Paperback
- 1985, USA, HarperTrophy ISBN 0-06-021943-2, Pub date 1985, Paperback
- 1977, Canada, Fitzhenry & Whiteside, 0-88-902374-3, Pub date 1977, Paperback
- 1997, USA, HarperTrophy ISBN 0-06-440058-1, Pub date June 6, 1997, Paperback
- 2003, USA, HarperTeen ISBN 0-06-054095-8, Pub date September 16, 2003, Paperback

Since its first publication, Julie of the Wolves has also been published in at least thirteen other languages, including Spanish, French, Arabic, Turkish, Chinese, and Japanese.

== Film, TV or theatrical adaptations ==
Julie of the Wolves has been adapted into a musical play, directed by Peter Dalto and written by Barbara Dana, with music by Chris Kubie and choreography by Fay Simpson. The musical stars Briana Sakamoto as Julie, and a workshop production was held on May 16, 2004, at The Northern Westchester Center for the Arts' Kaufman Theater. As of November 2005, Kubie notes on his website that "the journey of Julie Of The Wolves (the musical) continues as the writer Barbara Dana, prepares yet another rewrite."

Jean Craighead George announced in November 2007 that the book is being adapted into a film by Robert and Andy Young Productions Inc. Andy Young traveled to Nunavut in 2008 with the intention of finding a young Inuk or Inupiaq to play the role of Julie, but stated in April 2008 that he was in discussion with a non-Inuk to play the role because they "didn't find the person that we felt was going to breathe the right kind of feeling into the story", and because they had resistance from would-be investors to using a first-time actress for the film. Young had also intended to shoot the film in Nunavut, but is considering shooting in Alaska because of the lack of roads joining Nunavut to Southern Canada as well as the area's "limited financial incentives for filmmakers from outside the territory".

== Notes ==
Awards
Preceded by Mrs. Frisby and the Rats of NIMH	Newbery Medal recipient 1973	Succeeded by The Slave Dancer
