= Martin Greenberg (poet) =

American poet and translator (1918–2021)

- Born: February 3, 1918
- Died: May 19, 2021 (aged 103)
- Occupation: Poet
- Spouse: Paula Fox (m. 1962; died 2017)
- Children: 1

Martin Greenberg (February 3, 1918 – May 19, 2021) was an American poet and translator.

== Life ==
Greenberg was the son of a Jewish couple, immigrants from Lithuania. He was born in Norfolk, Virginia, in February 1918. His elder brother, Clement Greenberg, was an influential art critic in the United States from the 1950s to 1970s. Martin graduated from the University of Michigan and then served in the United States Army during World War II as a staff sergeant. On June 9, 1962, he married Paula Fox. Martin had a son, David, from a previous marriage and three stepchildren; Linda, Adam and Gabriel. His translations have appeared in The New Criterion. He died in Brooklyn, New York, in May 2021 at the age of 103.

== Awards ==
- 1989 Harold Morton Landon Translation Award

== Works ==
=== Translations ===
- Martin Greenberg (March 2001). "Four poems by Rainer Maria von Rilke". The New Criterion. Archived from the original on 2011-06-13.
- Johann Wolfgang von Goethe (1992). Faust: A Tragedy, Part One. Translator Martin Greenberg. Yale University Press. ISBN 978-0-300-05656-3.
- Johann Wolfgang von Goethe (1998). Faust. Part two. Translator Martin Greenberg. Yale University Press. ISBN 978-0-300-06826-9.
- von Kleist, Heinrich (1960). The Marquise of O: and other stories. Translator Martin Greenberg. Criterion Books. ISBN 0-14-044359-2.
- von Kleist, Heinrich (1988). Five Plays. Yale University Press. ISBN 0-300-04238-8.
- Kafka, Franz; Brod, Max (1948). Max Brod (ed.). The Diaries of Franz Kafka: 1914-1923. Translator Joseph Kresh, Hannah Arendt, Martin Greenberg. Schocken Books.

=== Non-fiction ===
- The Terror of Art: Kafka and Modern Literature. Basic Books. 1968.
- The Hamlet Vocation of Coleridge and Wordsworth. University of Iowa Press. 1986. ISBN 9781587290961.
