= The Eeries =

American rock band

- Genres: Alternative rock
- Years active: 2012–present
- Labels: Interscope
- Members: Isaiah Silva; Brandon Sweeney; Eliot Lorango; Nadir Maraschin; Mark Lear

The Eeries are an American rock band formed in 2012 with members from Fullerton, California; Munster, Indiana; Torrance, California, and the town of Schio near Venice, Italy. Their single "Cool Kid" charted at number 33 on the Alternative Songs chart.

== History ==
The Eeries have released one self-titled EP via Interscope Records. On December 9, 2014, The Eeries performed their single "Cool Kid" on Late Night with Seth Meyers.

== Band members ==
- Isaiah Silva - lead vocals/guitars
- Brandon Sweeney – lead guitar/backup vocals
- Eliot Lorango – bass/backup vocals
- Nadir Maraschin – drums
- Mark Lear – banjo string test lead

== Discography ==
Extended plays

- The Eeries (2014)
