= Desperate Characters (novel) =

Book by Paula Fox

- First edition
- Author: Paula Fox
- Language: English
- Genre: Novel
- Set in: Brooklyn, New York
- Publisher: Harcourt Brace
- Publication date: 1970
- Publication place: United States
- Media type: Print
- Pages: 156
- ISBN: 0-393-35110-6

Desperate Characters is a 1970 novel by Paula Fox.

== Plot ==
Sophie and Otto Bentwood are a childless, upper-middle class married couple who live in a brownstone in Brooklyn. She is a translator, he an attorney, currently preoccupied by the acrimonious break-up of his long-time business partnership. The action of the novel unfolds in a single long weekend following an incident in which a stray cat bites Sophie on the hand. Though she refuses to see a doctor, Sophie worries incessantly that she may have contracted rabies.

Sophie attends a party, lunches with a friend, shops for kitchen appliances, and drives with Otto to their country home. On a night-time walk with Otto's partner, Charlie Russell, she inadvertently confesses to having had an affair. A series of disquieting events – a rock thrown through a bedroom window, a mysterious phone call, the vandalism of the country house – unnerve the Bentwoods, heightening the fragility of their emotional states and their marriage.

On Monday morning, Sophie announces aloud, with "extraordinary relief", "God, if I am rabid, I am equal to what is outside." Shortly afterwards, however, it is established that she is not rabid. Yet on the telephone to an acquaintance, Sophie lashes out; and when Otto arrives home from work, to a phone call from Charlie, he finally has an outburst of rage, hurling against the wall a bottle of ink with which Sophie had planned to write a letter to her mother.

== Title ==
The title, Desperate Characters, comes from a sentence in Henry David Thoreau’s Walden: “The mass of men lead lives of quiet desperation.”

In the novel, Charlie and Sophie discuss Charlie's "desperation," and Otto tells Sophie that he and Charlie had recently argued over the Thoreau quote. Charlie had written the quote down, in order to stare at it, and called it "a prime example of middle-class self-love." This began a fierce argument between the two men. In the final scene, the motif of desperation returns: Charlie, demanding to speak to Otto on the telephone, yells out that he's desperate, and Otto shouts, "He's desperate!" before throwing the ink bottle at the wall.

== Themes ==
In Martha Conway's words, Desperate Characters "has at its center the social upheaval—real or imagined" of the 1970s. Signs of the collapse of the social order intrude into the Bentwoods' lives, mirroring the impending collapse of their marriage. Although Sophie and Otto never actually suffer any severe harm over the weekend, this is itself a source of tension, creating unease and foreboding. The suspense comes from the anticipation – both the Bentwoods' and the reader's – of "implosion."

Franzen has also suggested that Desperate Characters should be "read in the context of a contemporary art scene whose aim is the destruction of order and meaning." The Bentwoods, highly cultured and literate, are tormented by "an overload of meaning," which ultimately resembles the absence of any meaning: they are "oppressed and finally overwhelmed by the way in which the most casual words and tiniest incidents feel like 'portents.'" Sophie and Otto's outbursts on Monday, therefore, are read as the Bentwoods "revolting against an unbearable, almost murderous sense of the importance of their words and thoughts."

The novel also alludes to class and racial tensions – such as in a scene in which the Bentwoods uneasily allow a black man to use their home telephone. Fox has said of the novel, "There’s a kind of muted drumbeat, which is what racial tension always sounds like to me, except when it explodes."

== Publication history ==
Desperate Characters fell out of print until its 1980 reissue by Godine, which included an afterword by Irving Howe. After another period out of print, it was reissued in 1999 by W.W. Norton, with a preface by Jonathan Franzen. The 1999 reissue was inspired by the publication in Harper’s of "Why Bother?", in which Franzen lauds the novel. It has been translated into Spanish, Italian, German, Swedish, French, Portuguese, Greek, and Slovak.

== Critical reception ==
The novel received generally good reviews both upon its release and in subsequent printings. Howe, in his afterword to the 1980 reissue, placed it within "a major American tradition, the line of the short novel exemplified by Billy Budd, The Great Gatsby, Miss Lonelyhearts and Seize the Day": a tradition in which "everything—action, form, language—is fiercely compressed, and often enough, dark-grained as well." In his preface to the new edition, Franzen called it the greatest realist novel of the postwar era.

== Adaptations in other media ==
The book was made into a movie starring Shirley MacLaine in 1971. Fox did not like the movie: "The whole thing lacked a certain kind of inner gravity."

== Appearances in popular culture ==
The book was referenced in the first season of the Netflix series You, alongside its literary basis, You.
