= Paula Fox =

American author (1923–2017)

- Born: April 22, 1923; New York City, U.S.
- Died: March 1, 2017 (aged 93); New York City, U.S.
- Occupation: Writer
- Spouses: Howard Bird (m. 1940, divorced); Richard Sigerson (m. 1948, divorced); Martin Greenberg (m. 1962)
- Children: 3; including Linda Carroll (Note: Fox is also the birth mother of Linda Carroll (b. 1944), who was adopted by an Italian Catholic family. In turn, Carroll is the mother of Courtney Love. • "MOTHERS & DAUGHTERS: Courtney Love's mom, Linda Carroll, reflects on her daughter and her own birth mother", Neva Chronin, San Francisco Chronicle, Sunday, February 5, 2006. Retrieved 2012-02-27.)
- Parent: Paul Hervey Fox (father)
- Relatives: Courtney Love (granddaughter); Frances Bean Cobain (great-granddaughter)
- Writing career
- Period: 1966–2011
- Genres: Children's literature; novels, memoirs
- Notable works: Desperate Characters; The Slave Dancer; Borrowed Finery (memoir)
- Notable awards: Newbery Medal; 1974; Hans Christian Andersen Award; 1978

Paula Fox (April 22, 1923 – March 1, 2017) was an American author of novels for adults and children and of two memoirs. Fox won the Newbery Medal in 1974 for her novel The Slave Dancer. She also won the Hans Christian Andersen Award in 1978 and won a 1983 National Book Award in category Children's Fiction (paperback) for A Place Apart. In the mid-1990s, she enjoyed a revival as her adult fiction was championed by a new generation of American writers. In 2011, she was inducted into the New York State Writers Hall of Fame.

Fox is the biological mother of writer Linda Carroll and the biological grandmother of musician Courtney Love.

== Early life ==
Paula Fox was born in New York City on April 22, 1923. Her mother, Elsie De Sola, was a Cuban screenwriter. Her father, Paul Hervey Fox, was a writer as well.

Elsie De Sola Fox rejected Paula at birth, and she and her husband left Paula at a foundling home. Paula's maternal grandmother, Candelaria de Sola, rescued her. Unable at the time to provide a home for Fox herself, Candelaria gave the infant to Reverend Elwood Corning and his bedridden mother in Balmville, New York. Corning treated Fox kindly and taught her important lessons.

When Fox first visited her parents at age five, her mother openly scorned her. As Fox wrote in her memoir Borrowed Finery, the reunion was so traumatic that she sensed that if her mother "could have hidden the act she would have killed me." Fox would later refer to her mother as a "sociopath."

Fox was raised by a succession of relatives, friends, and paid caregivers. She attended high school for only five months.

Fox attended the Columbia University School of General Studies from 1955 to 1958.

== Career ==
Fox worked for years as a teacher and tutor for troubled children. Only in her 40s did she begin her first novel, Poor George, about a cynical schoolteacher who finds purpose—and ruin—in mentoring a vagrant teenager. The novel was received well (Bernard Bergonzi in the New York Review of Books calling it "the best novel I've read in a long time") but sold poorly, a pattern that all her adult novels would follow. Desperate Characters came next with Alfred Kazin calling it a "brilliant performance" and "quite devastating" while Lionel Trilling described it as "a reserved and beautifully realized novel".

For her contributions as a children's writer, Fox won the biennial, international Hans Christian Andersen Award in 1978, the highest international recognition for a creator of children's books. She also won several awards for particular children's books including the 1974 Newbery Medal for her novel The Slave Dancer; (Note: Beside winning the Newbery Medal for The Slave Dancer in 1974, Fox was a runner-up for One-Eyed Cat in 1985. Runner-up books are termed Newbery Honor Books and may display a silver seal.) a 1983 National Book Award in category Children's Fiction (paperback) for A Place Apart; (Note: Before winning the 1983 children's paperback fiction award for A Place Apart, Fox was a finalist for the overall National Book Award, Children's Literature with Blowfish Live in the Sea in 1971 and The Little Swineherd in 1979. • "National Book Awards – 1970". NBF. Retrieved 2012-02-08. (Select 1971 and 1979 from the top left menu.)) and the 2008 Deutscher Jugendliteraturpreis for A Portrait of Ivan (1969) in its German-language edition Ein Bild von Ivan. (Note: Besides winning the overall Children's Book prize in 2008 (Ein Bild von Ivan; A Portrait of Ivan, 1969), Fox made the Deutscher Jugendliteraturpreis Youth Book shortlist in 1988 (Der Schattentänzer; The Slave Dancer, 1974) and Children's Book shortlist in 2002 (Paul ohne Jacob; Radiance Descending, 1997, featuring a brother's Downs syndrome). For the latter and another book by Fox (Jenseits der Lügen; The Eagle Kite, 1995, featuring a father's homosexuality and AIDS) Cornelia Krutz-Arnold won a special prize for translation in 2002. • (Paula Fox, all listings). DJLP.) Her six novels went out of print in 1992. In the mid-1990s, she enjoyed a revival as her adult fiction was championed by a new generation of American writers.

In 2011, Fox was inducted into the New York State Writers Hall of Fame. She was championed by the author Jonathan Franzen, who saw that some of her books were re-issued.

== Personal life and death ==
In 1943, Fox was living in the household of famed acting coach Stella Adler and became friendly with Marlon Brando, another of Adler's students who was living there. She became pregnant and gave the child, Linda Carroll, up for adoption. There have been persistent rumors that Brando was in fact Carroll's father, although neither Brando nor Fox ever commented on the matter. Carroll, who became an author and psychotherapist, is the mother of musician Courtney Love. Frances Bean Cobain is Fox's great-granddaughter.

Fox married Richard Sigerson, by whom she had two sons. She later married literary critic and translator Martin Greenberg.

Fox was mugged in Jerusalem in 1996 and suffered a head injury that affected her ability to write.

Fox died at age 93 in Brooklyn on March 1, 2017.

== Adaptations ==
A 1993 Portuguese feature film, Coitado do Jorge, was based on Poor George. Desperate Characters was made into a movie starring Shirley MacLaine in 1971.

== Works ==
=== Children's fiction ===
- 1966 Maurice's Room (illustrated by Ingrid Fetz)
- 1967 How Many Miles to Babylon? (illus. Paul Giovanopoulos)
- 1967 A Likely Place (illus. Edward Ardizzone)
- 1968 Dear Prosper (illus. Steve McLachlin)
- 1968 The Stone-Faced Boy (illus. Donald A. Mackay)
- 1969 Hungry Fred (illus. Rosemary Wells)
- 1969 The King's Falcon (illus. Eros Keith)
- 1969 Portrait of Ivan (illus. Saul Lambert)
- 1970 Blowfish Live in the Sea
- 1973 Good Ethan (illus. Arnold Lobel)
- 1974 The Slave Dancer (illus. Eros Keith)
- 1978 The Little Swineherd and Other Tales (1996 edition illus. Robert Byrd)
- 1980 A Place Apart
- 1984 One-Eyed Cat
- 1986 The Moonlight Man ISBN 0-02-735480-6
- 1987 Lily and the Lost Boy (also as The Lost Boy) ISBN 0-531-08320-9
- 1988 The Village by the Sea (also as In a Place of Darkness)
- 1991 Monkey Island
- 1993 Western Wind
- 1995 The Eagle Kite (also as The Gathering Darkness)
- 1997 Radiance Descending
- 1999 Amzat and His Brothers: Three Italian Tales

=== Memoirs ===
- 2001 Borrowed Finery
- 2005 The Coldest Winter: A Stringer in Liberated Europe

=== Adult fiction ===
- 1967 Poor George
- 1970 Desperate Characters
- 1972 The Western Coast
- 1976 The Widow's Children
- 1984 A Servant's Tale
- 1990 The God of Nightmares
- 2011 News from the World: Stories and Essays

== See also ==
- List of Cuban American writers
- List of Famous Cuban-Americans
