= Monkey Island, Liberia =

River island group in Liberia

Monkey Island
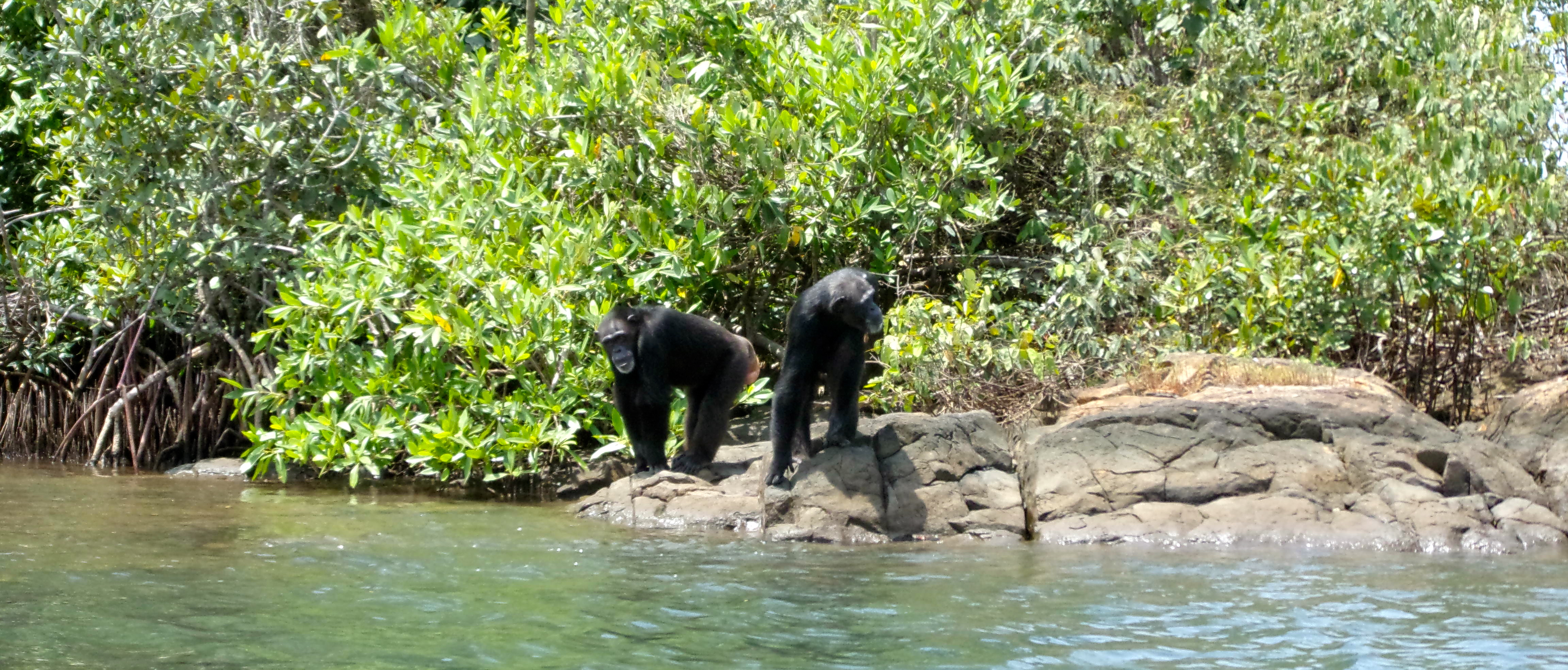
- Chimpanzees on Monkey Island, Liberia
- Interactive map of Monkey Island

Geography
- Location: Liberia
- Total islands: 6

Monkey Island is a cluster of six uninhabited mangrove islands in the Farmington and Little Bassa rivers in Liberia. They serve as an informal sanctuary for a group of chimpanzees that were used in biomedical research conducted by the New York Blood Center from the 1970s until 2005.

== Geography ==
The islands lie in the Marshall Wetlands, defined by the confluence of the Little Bassa and Farmington rivers in Grand Bassa County, Liberia, where they empty into the Atlantic Ocean. The islands are not individually named; however, the chimpanzees' carers have given them numerical designations: Island 5, located in the Farmington River, and Islands 1, 1A, 2, 3, and 4 in the Little Bassa river.

The area is characterized by mature mangrove forests, with savanna and secondary forests further inland.

== Chimpanzees ==
Beginning in 1974, the Vilab II research facility, backed by the New York Blood Center and the Liberian Institute for Biomedical Research, conducted hepatitis and other infectious disease experiments on chimpanzees in Liberia. After research was discontinued in 2005, the chimpanzees, unable to survive in the wild, were relocated to Monkey Island. Carers funded by the NYBC provided food and water for the chimpanzees daily, as the islands lack food and drinkable water. The New York Blood Center withdrew its support in 2015, which led to international outcry from animal welfare organizations, scientists, and the public. In 2017, the New York Blood Center agreed to give $6 million to the Humane Society of the United States, which had been providing emergency care, to ensure the future welfare of the chimpanzees.
