= Frank C. Craighead Sr. =

American entomologist

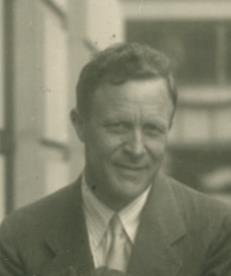
Frank C. Craighead

Frank Cooper Craighead Sr. (1890-1982) was an American entomologist and naturalist, who specialized among other subjects on the larvae of Coleoptera.

Craighead worked as principal entomologist for the United States Department of Agriculture and (co)authored many books on various environmentalist subjects, but is probably best known for the book "An illustrated synopsis of the principal larval forms of the order Coleoptera" that he co authored with Adam Giede Böving in 1930 with some 20 subsequent editions until 1953.

== Personal life ==
Craighead married the biologist technician Carolyn Johnson and together they had three children, twin sons and a daughter. The twins Frank and John became renowned naturalists in their own right as well (famous for their work on grizzly bears). The daughter, Jean Carolyn, became a well known author of books with nature and environmental themes for children and young adults.
