= Monkey Island (book) =

1991 novel by Paula Fox

- Cover of the 2016 Open Road Media edition
- Author: Paula Fox
- Language: English
- Publication date: 1991

Monkey Island is a 1991 children's novel by Paula Fox. It deals with family breakdown and homelessness.

== Plot ==
11-year-old Clay Garrity's dad, an art director, is out of work; Clay's mother trained for a good job - but it wasn't enough, especially with a baby coming. Unable to cope, Dad disappeared; now, without warning, Clay's distraught mother has also abandoned him, leaving him in an unsavory welfare hotel. When a neighbor suggests calling the police, Clay bolts, afraid that becoming a foster child would mean losing his mother forever. He lands in a park with Buddy, a hard-working young black man who can't earn enough for a rent deposit, and Calvin, a retired teacher who lost everything in a fire. Weeks later, their fragile existence is destroyed by an invasion of raging toughs ("the stump people") who demolish their meager, hard-won amenities and scatter the park's inhabitants. Indirect results include Calvin's death; Clay, weak from malnutrition and exposure, is hospitalized.

== Reception ==
Kirkus Reviews called the novel "an absorbing, profoundly disturbing but ultimately hopeful story." Publishers Weekly said that "Once again Fox displays her remarkable ability to render life as seen by a sensitive child who has bumped up against harsh circumstances."
