= Éditions des archives contemporaines =

French academic publishing house

- Parent company: Contemporary Publishing International
- Status: Active
- Founded: 1972
- Country of origin: France
- Distribution: Global
- Imprints: Éditions scientifiques GB (Gordon & Breach)
- Official website: archivescontemporaines.com

Éditions des archives contemporaines are a major French academic publishing house founded in 1972, existing in its current form since 2001. It incorporates Éditions scientifiques GB (Gordon & Breach), a French scientific publishing imprint. It is notable for its frequent collaboration with Agence universitaire de la Francophonie in publishing the results of French academic research. Éditions des archives contemporaines has published a number of monographs of research produced by the Centre d'études de recherches comparées sur la création at the École normale supérieure de Lyon.
