= Courtney Love discography =

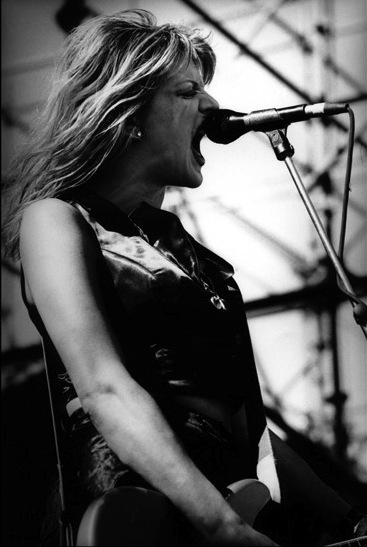
- Studio albums: 1
- Soundtrack albums: 3
- Singles: 5
- Music videos: 2
- Other collaborations: 3

This is a comprehensive listing of official releases by Courtney Love, best known as the lead vocalist of the alternative rock band Hole. Aside from her numerous releases with Hole, Love has released one solo studio album, five singles, and appeared in several musical collaborations.

Love's musical career started with a brief position as a singer in Faith No More. Love also founded the all-female group Babes in Toyland with Kat Bjelland, though she was kicked out of the band. Love formed Hole in 1989, and the band released their debut album Pretty on the Inside in 1991. Love married Nirvana frontman Kurt Cobain in 1992, and the same year their child Frances Bean Cobain was born. The band's next album, Live Through This, was released in 1994 a week after Cobain's death. Live Through This became the band's best-selling album, topped the annual Village Voice Pazz & Jop critic's poll and was listed by Time in a 100 best albums list. Hole's third album, Celebrity Skin, had lower U.S. sales than Live Through This, but received critical acclaim, and the album's title track garnered them their first No. 1 single on the Modern Rock Tracks chart.

In 2001, Love formed the band Bastard with Hole drummer Patty Schemel, though the group quickly dissolved after recording several demos. Love and guitarist Eric Erlandson disbanded Hole in 2002 amidst a lawsuit from Universal Music Group against the band for breach of contract. Love released her first solo album, America's Sweetheart, in 2004 to underwhelming sales. In 2009, Love re-formed Hole with new members, releasing the album Nobody's Daughter, which had originally been conceived as a solo album in 2006. In 2013, Love stated that she was again abandoning the Hole moniker, and was returning to recording and performing under her own name as a solo artist. She revealed she had recorded a total of twelve new songs, including the tracks "This Is War", "Wedding Day", and "California", all of which she planned to release on her purported second album, the tentatively titled Died Blonde. In April 2014 "You Know My Name"/"Wedding Day" was released as a double A-side single and garnered praise.

In February 2015, two tracks Love contributed to Fox's hit television series Empire were featured on the show's soundtrack: "Walk Out On Me" and "Take Me to the River" were both produced by Timbaland. Courtney played the role of Empire Record's biggest star "Elle Dallas", a hard rock/soul diva who is determined to make a comeback. Both tracks were received well by the fans and press alike.

== Studio albums ==
Title	Details	Peak chart positions							
Title	Details	US	AUS	AUT	FRA	GER	NZ	SWE	UK
America's Sweetheart	Release date: February 10, 2004; Label: Virgin Records; Formats: CD, music download	53	40	62	85	49	26	13	56

== Singles ==
Single	Year	Peak chart positions			Album
Single	Year	US Alt	UK	UK Ind	Album
"Mono"	2004	18	41	—	America's Sweetheart
"Hold On to Me"	2004	39	—	—	America's Sweetheart
"You Know My Name" / "Wedding Day"	2014	—	—	34	Non-album single
"Honour" (with Ginger Wildheart)	2015	—	—	—	Non-album single
"Miss Narcissist" / "Killer Radio"	2015	—	—	—	Non-album single
"—" denotes releases that did not chart

== Soundtrack contributions ==
Song	Year	Album
"I Stalked Him"	2004	Mayor of the Sunset Strip
"Love, Love, Love" (duet with Roddy Bottum)	2005	Adam & Steve
"Walk Out On Me"	2015	Empire: Original Soundtrack from Season 1
"Mother"	2020	The Turning: Original Motion Picture Soundtrack

== Guest appearances ==
Song	Year	Album
"Rio Grande" (duet with Michael Stipe)	2013	Son of Rogues Gallery: Pirate Ballads, Sea Songs & Chanteys
"Rat a Tat" (Fall Out Boy featuring Courtney Love)	2013	Save Rock and Roll
"Song to the Siren" (070 Shake featuring Courtney Love)	2024	Petrichor

== Other appearances ==
Song	Year	Notes
"Take Me to the River"	2015	Recorded for Empire

== Videography ==
=== Music videos ===
Song	Year	Director
"Mono"	2004	Chris Milk
"You Know My Name"	2014	Maximilla Lukacs

== See also ==
- Hole discography
