= Courtney Love filmography =

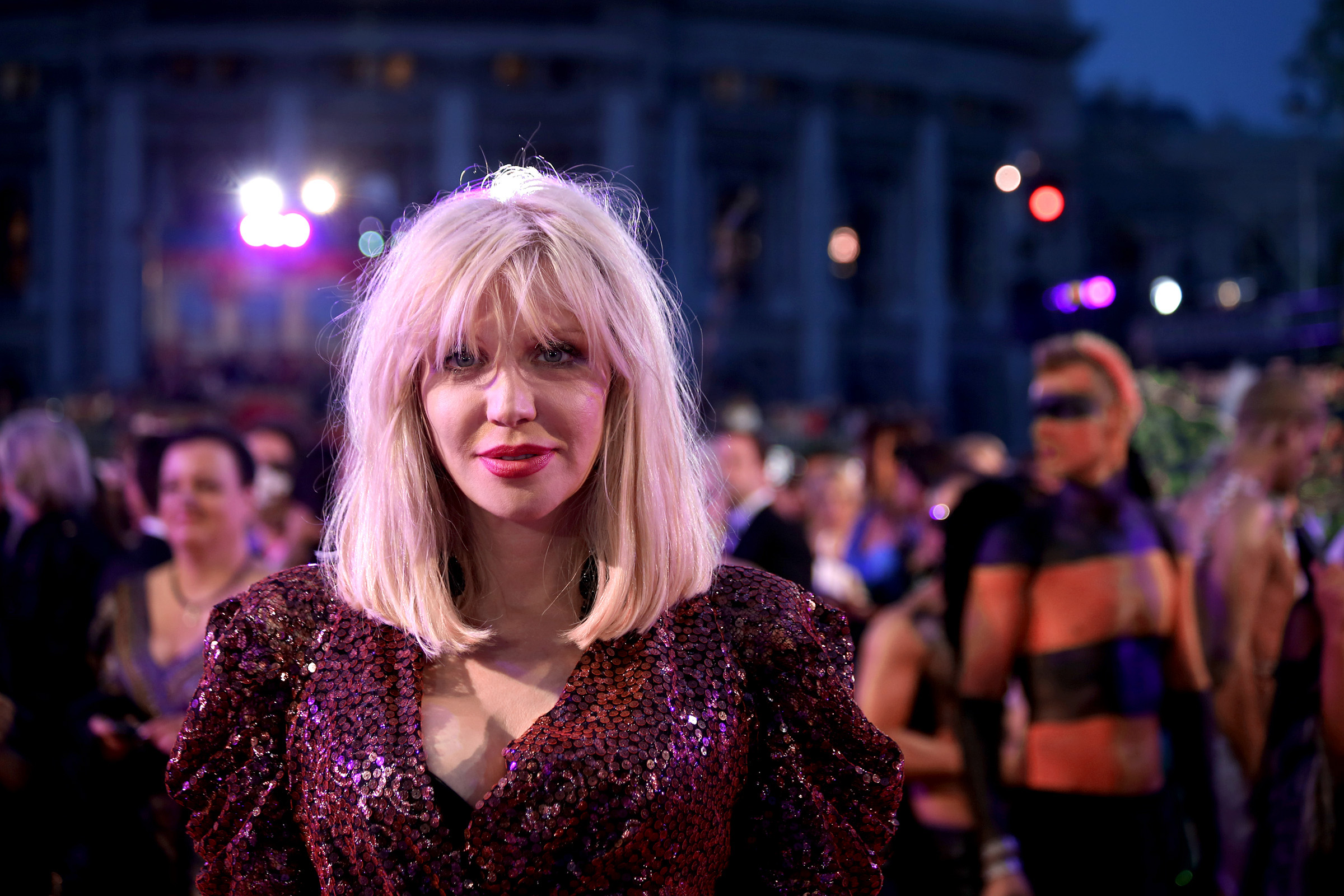
Love attending an event in 2014.

Courtney Love is an American musician and actress who began her professional career in film in 1986 with a supporting role in Alex Cox's Sid and Nancy (1986); she had prior studied film with experimental director George Kuchar at the San Francisco Art Institute in 1984, and appeared in one of Kuchar's short films. After pursuing music and having a successful career as the frontwoman of alternative rock band Hole, Love also had intermittent roles in films, most notably receiving critical attention for her performance as Althea Flynt in Miloš Forman's 1996 biopic The People vs. Larry Flynt, which earned her a Golden Globe Nomination for Best Actress, as well as awards from the Boston, Chicago, New York, and Los Angeles film critics associations. Love later appeared among an ensemble cast in 200 Cigarettes (1998), as well as in a leading role in Man on the Moon (1999) alongside Jim Carrey, for which she received critical recognition. She later appeared in several independent films and short subjects as well as the thriller Trapped (2002) alongside Charlize Theron and Kevin Bacon, and Julie Johnson (2001), for which she received an award for Best Actress at Los Angeles' gay and lesbian Outfest film festival.

In 2014, Love joined the cast of the FX series Sons of Anarchy for the show's seventh and final season in a recurring role; this marked Love's debut role in a television series. Subsequent television work included appearances on the ABC-TV nighttime soap Revenge as well as the hit Lee Daniels drama Empire. In 2018, Love made a supporting appearance in director Justin Kelly's JT LeRoy.

Love has also appeared in a multitude of documentary films as both an interviewee as well as in archival and live footage, including the Sonic Youth documentary subject 1991: The Year Punk Broke (1992); Not Bad for a Girl (1995), which focused on women in alternative music; and Hit So Hard (2011), which documented the life of Love's bandmate, drummer Patty Schemel. A documentary of Love's life, Antiheroine, will premiere at the Sundance Film Festival in 2026.

== Films ==
Year	Title	Role	Director	Notes	Ref.
1984	Club Vatican	Girl	George Kuchar	Short film	
1986	Sid and Nancy	Gretchen	Alex Cox		
1987	Straight to Hell	Velma	Alex Cox		
1988	Tapeheads	Norman's Spanker	Bill Fishman	Uncredited	
1996	Basquiat	Big Pink	Julian Schnabel		
1996	Feeling Minnesota	Rhonda	Steven Baigelman		
1996	The People vs. Larry Flynt	Althea Leasure Flynt	Miloš Forman		
1999	200 Cigarettes	Lucy	Risa Bramon Garcia		
1999	Man on the Moon	Lynne Margulies	Miloš Forman		
2000	Beat	Joan Vollmer Burroughs	Gary Walkow		
2001	Julie Johnson	Claire	Bob Gosse		
2002	Trapped	Cheryl	Luis Mandoki		
2005	Trailer for a Remake of Gore Vidal's Caligula	Caligula	Francesco Vezzoli	Short film	
2011	Courtney in Wonderland	Herself	Jason Bell	Short film	
2015	Kansas City Choir Boy	Athena	Kevin Newbury	Stage	
2015	The Long Home	Pearl	James Franco	Unreleased	
2017	Menendez: Blood Brothers	Kitty Menendez	Fenton Bailey; Randy Barbato	Television film	
2018	JT LeRoy	Sasha	Justin Kelly		

== Television ==
Year	Series	Role	Notes	Ref.
1998-2010	Behind the Music	Herself	2 episodes	
2003	The Osbournes	Herself	1 episode	
2005	Comedy Central Roast of Pamela Anderson	Herself		
2014	Sons of Anarchy	Ms. Harrison	Recurring role; 4 episodes	
2015	The Hopes	Chase Hope	Television short	
2015	Empire	Elle Dallas	2 episodes	
2015	Revenge	White Gold	Guest star; 3 episodes	
2016	Anna Faris is Unqualified	Herself	Guest star	
2017	A Midsummer's Nightmare	Titania	Featured role; TV movie/backdoor pilot	
2018	RuPaul's Drag Race	Herself (guest judge)	1 episode ("Tap That App")	
2021	Bruises of Roses	Lead performer	1 episode	
2024	Courtney Love's Women	Host	BBC Series	
2024	Never Mind the Buzzcocks	Panelist	1 episode	

== Documentaries ==
Year	Documentary features	Role	Notes	Ref.
1993	1991: The Year Punk Broke	Herself		
1995	Not Bad for a Girl	Herself		
1997	Off the Menu: The Last Days of Chasen's	Herself		
1998	Kurt & Courtney	Herself		
1999	Clara Bow: Discovering the "It" Girl	Herself	Voice-over narrator	
2000	Bounce: Behind the Velvet Rope	Herself		
2001	Eminem: Behind the Mask	Herself		
2001	Last Party 2000	Herself		
2003	Mayor of the Sunset Strip	Herself		
2006	The Return of Courtney Love	Herself	Produced for Channel 4	
2011	Hit So Hard	Herself		
2011	Bob and the Monster	Herself		
2012	Sunset Strip	Herself		
2015	Kurt Cobain: Montage of Heck	Herself		
2025	Broken English	Herself		
2026	Antiheroine	Herself		

== Music videos ==
Year	Songs	Artist(s)	Notes
1988	"I Wanna Be Sedated"	Ramones	Uncredited
1992	"Garbadge Man"	Hole	
1993	"Beautiful Son"	Hole	Unreleased
1994	"Miss World"	Hole	
1994	"Doll Parts"	Hole	
1995	"Violet"	Hole	
1995	"Softer, Softest"	Hole	MTV Unplugged performance
1996	"Gold Dust Woman"	Hole	Recorded for The Crow: City of Angels soundtrack
1998	"Celebrity Skin"	Hole	
1998	"Malibu"	Hole	
1999	"Awful"	Hole	Live footage
2000	"Be a Man"	Hole	Released for Any Given Sunday soundtrack
2004	"Mono"	Courtney Love	
2011	"Samantha"	Hole	
2014	"Rat a Tat"	Fall Out Boy	
2014	"You Know My Name"	Courtney Love	
2018	"Tattooed in Reverse"	Marilyn Manson	

== See also ==
- Courtney Love discography
- List of awards and nominations received by Courtney Love

== Sources ==
- Hemmer, Kurt (2006). Encyclopedia of Beat Literature. New York: Facts on File. ISBN 978-0-8160-4297-5. OCLC 907149008.
- Mitchell, Claudia; Reid-Walsh, Jacqueline (2007). Girl Culture: An Encyclopedia (Two Volumes). Greenwood Publishing. ISBN 978-0-313-33908-0. OCLC 173659637.
