= Folksinger (disambiguation) =

A folk singer or folksinger is a person who sings traditional or contemporary folk music.

Folksinger may also refer to:

- Folksinger (Dave Van Ronk album), a 1962 album by Dave Van Ronk
- Folk Singer (album), a 1964 album by Muddy Waters
- Folksinger (Phranc album), a 1985 album by Phranc
- "Folksinger" (Phranc song), 1989
- "The Folk Singer" (Tommy Roe song), 1963
- "The Folk Singer" or "Folk Singer", a 1968 song by Johnny Cash
- The Belafonte Folk Singers
- Folksingers 'Round Harvard Square, a 1959 album featuring Joan Baez and Bill Wood
- My Son, the Folk Singer, a 1962 album by Allan Sherman
