= Brother Clyde (album) =

Studio album by Brother Clyde
- Released: August 10, 2010
- Genre: Alternative rock
- Length: 37:35
- Label: Fontana/Buena Vista
- Producer: Billy Ray Cyrus

Singles from Brother Clyde
- 1. "Lately" Released: June 29, 2010

Brother Clyde is the debut studio album from alternative rock group Brother Clyde. It is the first side-project from country music singer Billy Ray Cyrus. The album features duets with Cyrus' son Trace Cyrus as well as Dolly Parton, who Cyrus said "wanted to rock." It was released on August 10, 2010. Its first single, "Lately", which features rapper King Phaze, was issued to digital retailers on June 29, 2010, and a music video, which was directed by Cyrus, was released for the song in July 2010.

== Background ==
While the original line up for the band included Billy Ray Cyrus, John Waite, Jeffrey Steele and Phil Vassar, the artists' schedules became too busy for the band to meet up and record material for their debut album. However, in 2009, Cyrus was filming Christmas in Canaan and he came across Morris Joseph Tancredi. The two began to talk about music and Tancredi played Cyrus a song he had written, called "Lately." Cyrus immediately took a liking to the song and asked Tancredi if he had any more material. Soon after, Cyrus met with Samantha Maloney, Jamie Miller, Dan Knight and Dave Henning. The five of them soon became the new line up for Brother Clyde, with Cyrus as the head of the band.

The group then began recording material for their debut album. "Lately" was released to radio and digital retailers as their first single on June 29, 2010. It also features rapper King Phaze.

== Critical reception ==
Allmusic reviewer Thom Jurek said that the album sounded like a dated-sounding alternative rock record which contains some inspired, well-crafted songs, and mostly honest emotional performances. Jurek also went on to say that the collaboration with Dolly Parton was one of the best cuts on the album

== Track listing ==
No.	Title	Writer(s)	Length
1.	"Lately" (with King Phaze)	Jonathan Rivera, Morris Joseph Tancredi	3:50
2.	"Lie to Me"	Billy Ray Cyrus, Tancredi	4:00
3.	"Waiting"	Cyrus, Tancredi	3:50
4.	"Slip Away"	Cyrus, Tancredi	3:05
5.	"Crawl"	Jamie Arentzen, Stacy Jones	3:18
6.	"Son of a Gun"	James Dean Hicks, Jamie Houston	4:11
7.	"How Long"	Cyrus, Tancredi	4:14
8.	"Alive" (with Trace Cyrus)	Cyrus, Trace Cyrus, Tancredi	4:18
9.	"The Right Time" (with Dolly Parton)	Cyrus, Dolly Parton, Tancredi	3:34
10.	"I Walk the Line"	John R. Cash	3:08

== Personnel ==
- Jamie Arentzen - instrumentation
- Billy Ray Cyrus - guitar, lead vocals, background vocals
- Trace Cyrus - vocals on "Alive"
- Mike Estes - guitar
- Owen Hale - drums
- James Dean Hicks - background vocals
- Jamie Houston - guitar, background vocals
- Stacy Jones - instrumentation
- King Phaze - vocals on "Lately"
- Ed King - guitar
- Don Kirkpatrick - guitar
- Fred Kron - keyboards
- Al Moody - bass guitar
- Johnny Neil - keyboards
- Dolly Parton - vocals on "The Right Time"
- Michael J. Sagraves - harp
- Morris Joseph Tancredi - bass guitar, drums, acoustic guitar, electric guitar
- Ted Wadhams - bass guitar
- Denny Westin Jr. - drums
- Jason D. Williams - piano

== Chart performance ==
Chart (2010)	Peak position
U.S. Billboard Top Heatseekers	40
