= Sharkmuffin =

Rock band from New York City

- Origin: Brooklyn, New York City, U.S.
- Genres: Garage punk, garage rock, surf rock, grunge
- Years active: 2012-present
- Labels: Dazzleships Records, State Capital Records, Little Dickman Records, Exploding in Sound
- Members: Tarra Thiessen; Natalie Kirch
- Website: www.sharkmuffin.com

Sharkmuffin is an independent DIY rock band from New York City.

== History ==
Sharkmuffin is a garage rock "glam grunge" trio from Brooklyn, New York City, New York. The band is composed of guitarist and vocalist Tarra Thiessen and bassist and vocalist Natalie Kirch. Thiessen and Kirch have been the sole consistent members of the band, with a revolving door of drummers over the years including Jordyn Blakely, Janet LaBelle, Kim Deuss and Patty Schemel. Their music is described as "Brooklyn garage noise pop" and "blitzkrieg bop, rust-tinged rock and acid-soaked surf monster punk," and classified as grunge, psychedelic and hard rock. Sharkmuffin cites influence from Nirvana and the Ramones. The group formed at a Jersey Shore beach house, and released three EPs in 2013, Sharkmuffin, 1097 and She-Gods of Champagne Valley, with Dazzleships Records.

The single "Mondays" was released on 7 July 2015, and was featured on the radio station NPR's podcast All Songs Considered, who note that it is "coated thick on the beachy vocals." They released their debut ten-track album Chartreuse on 7 August 2015, which featured former Hole drummer Patty Schemel. Noisey calls the album "catchy garage jams with a pop edge." The title-track is described by The Aquarian Weekly, as "the sound of a thousand hornets[,] tearing through dangerous curves of unabridged and psychedelic dervish raunch." Drummer Sharif Mekawy and guitarist Davey Jones joined Sharkmuffin on tour in support of the album. Tsuki, Sharkmuffin's second album, was released with Little Dickman Records on 5 May 2017, and features drummer Kim Deuss. The song "Scully is a Sharkmuffin" was mostly improvised and recorded live, and is their "ode to The X-Files." A review from Speak Into My Good Eye compares the album to the music of the Ronettes, Tacocat, Screaming Females and Chastity Belt, and says they are "supremely tight [with] a driving hooky sound that produces these intense little earworms that you never want to slip your mind." Touring in support of the album featured drummer Drew Adler and guitarist Chris Nunez.

In July 2017, Sharkmuffin released an eight-track split cassette tape with the Off White, entitled Sharkmuffin & the Off White with Little Dickman Records. A second pressing of Tsuki was released on Little Dickman Records, which contained two new tracks with drummer Jordyn Blakely, in July 2018. The song "Big" was featured in the Showtime comedy series Shameless episode, "Black-Haired Ginger," which originally aired on 7 October 2018. A concept record, the five-track EP Gamma Gardening releases on cassette tape with Exploding in Sound on 5 April 2019. It is a science-fiction narrative about Serpentina, a receptionist at a gene editing laboratory, mother-to-be, and space dominatrix. Sharkmuffin toured the U.K. and Europe in support of the EP with Jordyn Blakely on drums.

== Band members ==
- Tarra Thiessen
- Natalie Kirch
- Rosie Slater

Past members & collaborators

- Janet Labelle
- Patty Schemel
- Kim Deuss
- Jordyn Blakely
- Davey Jones
- Drew Adler
- Chris Nunez
- Sharif Mekawy
- Jordyn Blakely

== Discography ==
Albums

- Chartreuse (2015)
- Tsuki (2017)

Singles & EPs

- Sharkmuffin (2013)
- 1097 (2013)
- She-Gods of Champagne Valley (2013)
- Red (2016)
- Sharkmuffin & the Off White (2017)
- Gamma Gardening (2019)
