= Milkman (disambiguation) =

A milkman is a person who delivers milk in bottles or cartons to houses.

Milkman may also refer to:

- Cowman (profession), a person responsible for milking
- Slang for a man who lactates: see Male lactation
- Milkman (novel), a 2018 novel by Anna Burns
- The Milkman, a 1950 American, black and white film
- The Milkman (1932 film), a 1932 Flip the Frog cartoon
- Milkman (rapper) (1989–2026), Mexican rapper, producer and composer
- Milkman (Phranc album), 1998
- Milk Man (Deerhoof album), 2004
- "Milkman", a song by Aphex Twin from Girl/Boy EP

== See also ==
- Alaska Milkmen, an old name for the basketball team Alaska Aces
- Lechero, a character in the American television series Prison Break
- Melkman or Melky Cabrera (born 1984), Dominican baseball player
