= Pablo Picasso (song) =

Song by the Modern Lovers

from the album The Modern Lovers
- Released: August 1976
- Recorded: April 1972
- Genre: Proto-punk
- Length: 4:15
- Label: Beserkley
- Songwriter: Jonathan Richman
- Producer: John Cale

"Pablo Picasso" is a song written by Jonathan Richman for the proto-punk group the Modern Lovers. The song was recorded in April 1972 at Whitney Studios in Los Angeles, and produced by Velvet Underground member John Cale, but was not released until August 1976, on the Modern Lovers' self-titled debut album, as the fourth track. The recording featured Richman on lead guitar and vocals, Ernie Brooks on a second guitar, Jerry Harrison on bass and David Robinson on drums, with Cale playing the repetitive hammered piano part.

The central character of the song is the charismatic 20th century artist Pablo Picasso. With dry wit, the lyrics suggest that women never rejected Picasso's romantic advances, despite his short stature. "Well he was only five foot three but girls could not resist his stare / Pablo Picasso was never called an asshole / Not in New York". In a 1980 interview, Richman stated that the song was inspired by his own adolescent "self-consciousness" with women.

== Cover versions ==
=== On recordings ===
- 1975 – John Cale, on his album Helen of Troy (released before the original version)
- 1979 – Catholic Discipline on their album Underground Babylon, a collection of live recordings
- 1984 – Burning Sensations on the Repo Man soundtrack
- 1991 – Phranc's version of the song, which substitutes Gertrude Stein as the central character; it appears on her album Positively Phranc
- 1998 – Television Personalities on Don't Cry Baby... It's Only a Movie
- 1999 – The Mentally Ill on the album Strike the Bottom Red
- 2003 – David Bowie, on his album Reality; a live version recorded at Riverside Studios, Hammersmith, London on 8 September 2003 was released on the 'Tour Edition' of Reality
- 2007 – Blue Peter, on their album Burning Bridges, recorded live in 1980
- 2007 – Four Year Beard on the album Hero: The Main Man Records Tribute to David Bowie (2007)
- 2012 – The Tellers on the album A Tribute to Repo Man
- 2018 – Jack White for a live Spotify Singles release
- 2024 – Chatterbox on the album When the Creatures Crawl

=== Live performances ===
- 1976 – Talking Heads live at Max's Kansas City.
- 1985 – Crystal Zoom performing at the Windsor Castle in Auckland, 29th June 1985.
- 1998 – Siouxsie Sioux - the Creatures with John Cale during their 1998 US double bill tour.
