= Wedding Day (song) =

Single by Courtney Love

from the album Died Blonde
- A-side: "You Know My Name"
- Released: May 4, 2014
- Recorded: 2014 at Atrium Studios in Calabasas, California
- Genre: Alternative rock, hard rock
- Length: 3:03
- Label: Cherry Forever
- Songwriter(s): Courtney Love, Micko Larkin
- Producer(s): Michael Beinhorn

Courtney Love singles chronology
"Hold On to Me" (2004)	"You Know My Name" / "Wedding Day" (2014)	"Miss Narcissist" (2015)

"Wedding Day" is a song by the American alternative rock musician Courtney Love. It is the first single from her upcoming second studio album Died Blonde, and was released on May 4, 2014, packaged as a double A-side single with the song "You Know My Name".

Originally intended for release as a single backed with the song "California", "Wedding Day"'s lyrics explore the end of a relationship. It was written by Love and guitarist Micko Larkin and recorded alongside "You Know My Name" at Atrium Studios in Calabasas, California in early 2014 with producer Michael Beinhorn.

"You Know My Name"/"Wedding Day" was released on Love's independent record label Cherry Forever Records, under license to Kobalt Label Services, and was supported by a well received eight-date tour of the United Kingdom. Critical reception to "Wedding Day" was also largely positive and the single placed in the Independent Singles Chart in the UK upon its release.

== Origin and recording ==
Love first mentioned "Wedding Day" in an interview with BUST in May 2013 where she described the song as "impeccably great as a slab of really raw rock with an insane hook". Love intended to release the song within two months on iTunes "like an old-school single" with the recently penned song "California" as a B-side; the plan was later abandoned. Following a short tour of the United States, Love intended to release the single in December and told Fashion magazine that "Wedding Day" was written after the frustration and anger of a recent break-up, explaining: "I got dumped, and [the lyric] 'Break my neck on my wedding day' just came out of me. I wondered about getting married. I’ve been asked twice before and said no. I just haven’t made that Jackie [Kennedy Onassis] move yet."

"Wedding Day" was written by Love and guitarist Micko Larkin. It was recorded in early 2014 at Atrium Studios in Calabasas, California and produced by Michael Beinhorn, who had previously produced Celebrity Skin (1998) and Nobody's Daughter (2010) by Love's former band Hole.

== Release and reception ==
"Wedding Day", along with "You Know My Name", is Love's first solo release in a decade, since America's Sweetheart (2004) and its two supporting singles: "Mono" and "Hold On to Me". The song premiered on Anja Caspary's radio programme Radio Affair on Radio Eins in Germany on April 28, 2014 and was later made available for stream on Love's official YouTube channel. "Wedding Day" was released as a double A-side single, also featuring "You Know My Name", on May 4, 2014 on Cherry Forever Records, under exclusive license to Kobalt Label Services. It was made available worldwide as a digital download on iTunes, and a neon pink 7" limited to 3,000 copies was released in the United Kingdom on May 26, 2014.

Love supported the release of "You Know My Name"/"Wedding Day" with an eight-date tour of the United Kingdom, beginning at the O_{2} Shepherds Bush Empire in London on May 11 and concluding at Think Tank in Newcastle upon Tyne on May 22. On the opening night of the tour, Love debuted "Wedding Day" live—performing it as the opening song—and received warm reviews from various publications. "You Know My Name"/"Wedding Day" entered the UK Independent Singles Chart at number 34, as well as the Independent Singles Breakers Chart at number 8.

Critical response to "Wedding Day" was largely favorable. Writing for Consequence of Sound, Alex Young said that it was "another, equally potent piece of rock music" following "You Know My Name", and Exclaim! writer Alex Hudson described the song as being "filled with barbed alt-rock riffs, and Love's vocals switch between a sneer and a raw scream". Chris Martins of Spin referred to "Wedding Day" as "a curdled bowl of snarled vocals, grinding guitar, and pounding rhythm" in which Love "sounds plenty authoritative".

== Track listing ==
Digital download and 7"

1. "You Know My Name" (Love, Larkin, Dailey) – 2:44
2. "Wedding Day" (Love, Larkin) – 3:03

== Chart positions ==
Chart (2014)	Peak position
UK Independent Singles Chart	34
UK Rock and Metal Singles Chart	18
UK Independent Singles Breakers Chart	8

== Release history ==
Region	Date	Format	Label	Catalog
Worldwide	May 4, 2014	Digital download	Cherry Forever	CFR001
United Kingdom	May 26, 2014	7"	Cherry Forever	CFR001VL
