= Tap That App =

- RuPaul's Drag Race episode
- Episode no.: Season 10; Episode 3
- Presented by: RuPaul
- Original air date: April 5, 2018

Guest appearances
- Courtney Love (guest judge); Nico Tortorella (guest judge)

Episode chronology
| ← Previous "PharmaRusical" | Next → "The Last Ball on Earth" |
- RuPaul's Drag Race season 10

"Tap That App" is the third episode of the tenth season of the American television series RuPaul's Drag Race. It originally aired on April 5, 2018. The episode's main challenge tasks contestants with filming advertisements for dating apps. Courtney Love and Nico Tortorella are guest judges. Yuhua Hamasaki is eliminated from the competition after placing in the bottom two and losing a lip-sync contest to "Celebrity Skin" by Hole.

== Episode ==
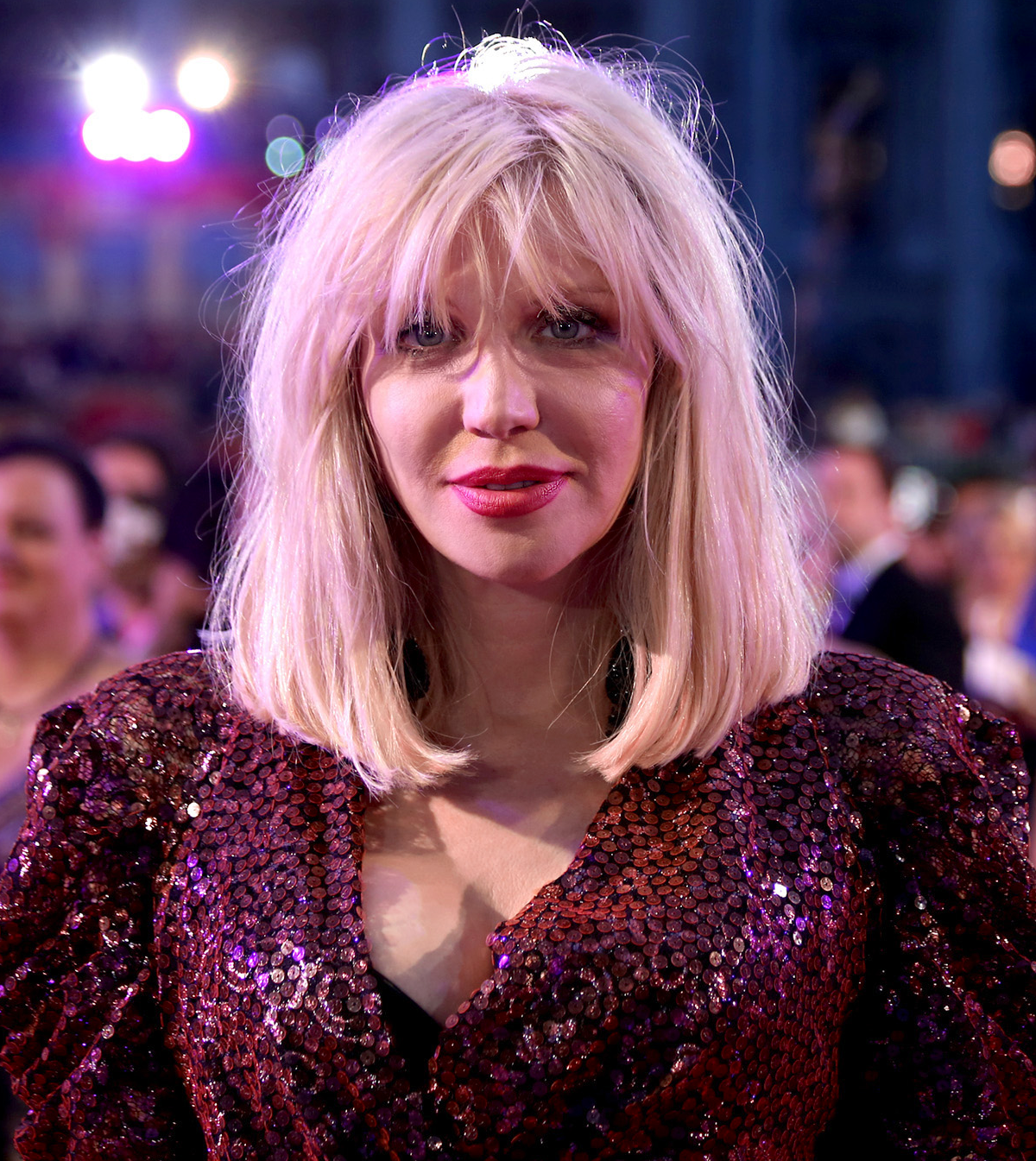
Courtney Love (pictured in 2014) is a guest judge.

The contestants return to the Werk Room after the elimination of Kalorie Karbdashian-Williams on the previous episode. On a new day, RuPaul greets the group and reveals the mini-challenge, which tasks contestants with performing in screen tests for RuPaul's Chocolate Bar campaign. The contestants have 20 minutes to get into "quick drag". Blair St. Clair, Monét X Change, and Monique Heart are declared the winners of the mini-challenge. As winners, the three contestants become team captains and select fellow teammates.

RuPaul reveals the main challenge, which tasks contestants with writing and acting in advertisements to promote three new dating apps. Following are the apps (with descriptions) and team members:

- End of Days, an app for doomsday preppers: Blair St. Clair, Eureka, Miz Cracker and The Vixen
- Fibstr, an app for pathological liars: Dusty Ray Bottoms, Kameron Michaels, Mayhem Miller and Monique Heart
- Madam ButtrFace, an app for people with better bodies than faces: Aquaria, Asia O'Hara, Monét X Change, and Yuhua Hamasaki

The contestants break into groups and begin to collaborate on their respective advertisements. The groups then film with Michelle Visage and Carson Kressley, with support from members of the Pit Crew. Back in the Werk Room, the contestants prepare for the fashion show. Aquaria and The Vixen get into an argument, before the group is interrupted by the presence of a spider. Blair St. Clair describes her experience growing up in a religious household. Dusty Ray Bottoms discusses her experience with coming out to her family, undergoing an exorcism, and going through conversion therapy. Dusty Ray Bottoms and Monét X Change describe some of their religious beliefs and practices. Aquaria and The Vixen continue to argue. Aquaria leaves the Werk Room.

On the main stage, RuPaul welcomes fellow judges Visage and Kressley, as well as guest judges Courtney Love and Nico Tortorella. RuPaul shares the runway category: "Feathers". The contestants present their looks in the fashion show, then the group and judges watch the three advertisements. The judges deliver their critiques, then deliberate. Asia O'Hara is deemed the winner of the main challenge. Mayhem Miller and Yuhua Hamasaki place in the bottom two and face off in a lip-sync contest to "Celebrity Skin" (1998) by Hole. Mayhem Miller wins the lip-sync and Yuhua Hamasaki is eliminated from the competition.

== Production ==
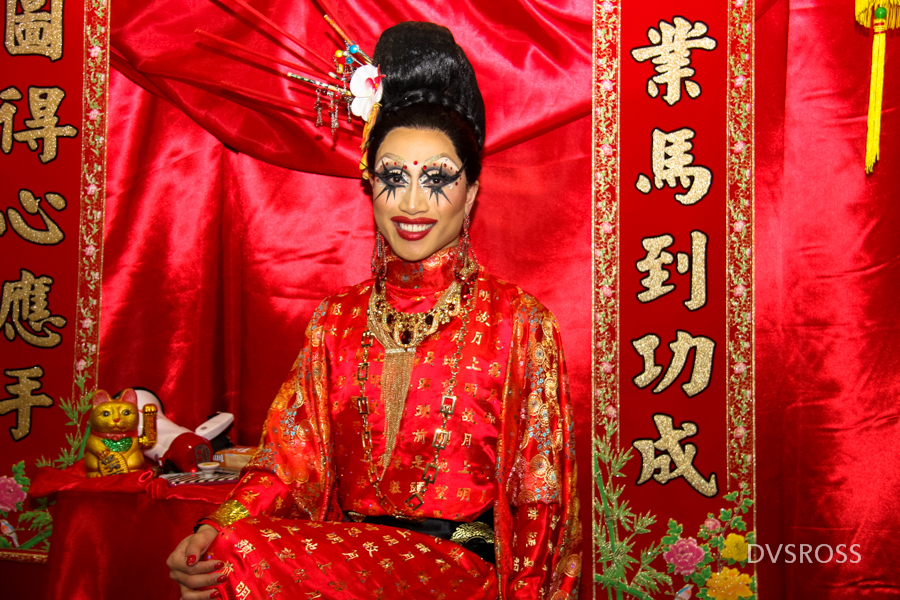
On the episode, Yuhua Hamasaki (pictured at RuPaul's DragCon LA in 2018) is eliminated from the competition.

"Tap That App" originally aired on April 5, 2018. The episode sees conflict between Aquaria and The Vixen. In the Werk Room, Dusty Ray Bottoms discusses her experience with conversion therapy.

According to Out magazine, "At the end of her lip sync performance to Hole's "Celebrity Skin" - right when the lyrics went 'You want a piece of me?' - Mayhem Miller started to deliberately pluck off the black and pink feathers from her outfit. After an electrifying performance during that entire lip sync, this final stunt buried down any chances of Mayhem being sent home that episode."

The Vixen discusses racism on the corresponding episode of RuPaul's Drag Race: Untucked.

=== Fashion ===
For the fashion show, Blair St. Clair wears a white outfit and a blonde wig. Miz Cracker's dress is blue with gold accents. Her headpiece resembles a bird nest. Eureka had a black dress and a tall blonde wig. The Vixen's dress has peacock feathers. She also has a headpiece. Monique Heart wears a phoenix-inspired white dress with gold feathers. She has a blonde wig.

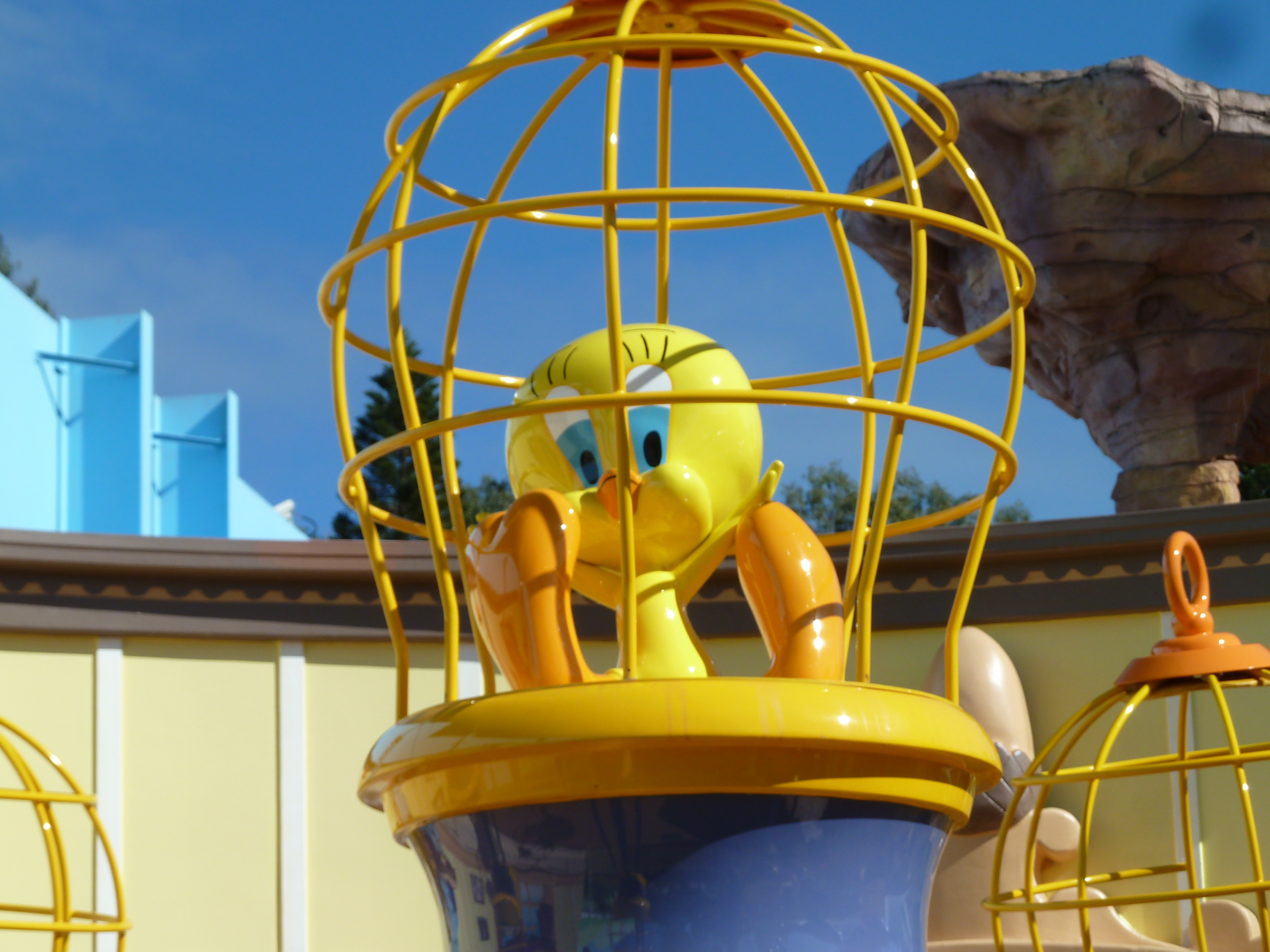
For the fashion show, Asia O'Hara wears a look inspired by the fictional cartoon character Tweety (pictured is a statue of the canary at Warner Bros. Movie World in Gold Coast, Australia in 2015).

Mayhem Miller's dress is pink and black. Dusty Ray Bottoms has a showgirl-inspired green-and-white dress and a red wig. Kameron Michaels has a black-and-gold outfit with wings, and she has horns on the top of her head. Monét X Change has a red outfit and a blonde wig. Asia O'Hara wears a Tweety-inspired yellow outfit with a black headpiece. Yuhau Hamasaki has a black dress and a red wig. She has multiple crows attached to her outfit. Aquaria wears a white outfit and her look gives the illusion of arrows having been shot through her body.

== Reception ==
Oliver Sava of The A.V. Club gave the episode a rating of 'A-'. Sava also said "Celebrity Skin" was their "favorite lip sync assassination" of the season. Rhuaridh Marr of Metro Weekly described the episode's mini-challenge as "bizarre". Joey Guerra of the Houston Chronicle opined, "Much of this episode, though, also felt off-kilter. The mini-challege was really silly, even by mini-challenge standards. And I just wasn't very interested in the dating app main challenge or the pointless drama between The Vixen and Aquaria."

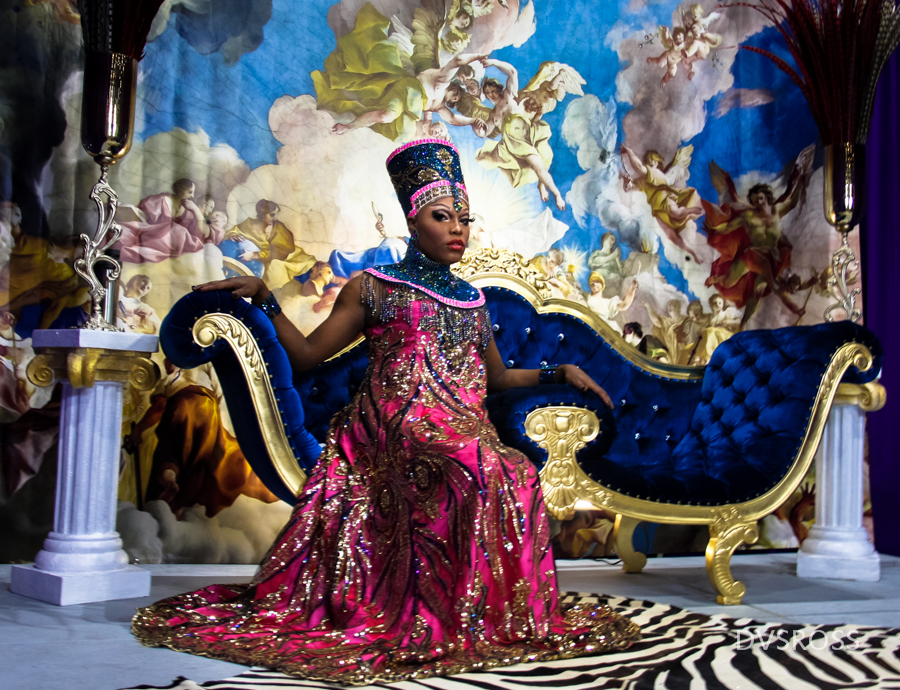
Asia O'Hara (pictured at RuPaul's DragCon LA in 2018) won the main challenge and received praise for her performance and fashion show presentation.

Asia O'Hara received praise for her main challenge performance and fashion show presentation. Ryan Shea of Instinct magazine said: "Episode three showed her really stepping her game up, by easily winning the Tap That App challenge by using one of the funniest faces I've ever seen on RPDR plus her feather-inspired runway look which was also able to find its funny by Asia consistently blowing the hair out of her face." Billboard's Christine Werthman wrote about Asia O'Hara: "She had me at Tap That App. Hilarious. And when she's not making an intentionally busted face, she's gorgeous, even when dressed as Big Bird." The website's Stephen Daw ranked Love's appearance number 46 in a 2018 list of the show's 50 "best musical moments". Daw wrote, "The starlet was stunned by the talent she saw on the stage, and got to see one of the best lip syncs in the show's history between Mayhem Miller and Yuhua Hamasaki to her classic Hole song".

Sam Damshenas of Gay Times ranked the outfits presented by Monique Heart, Asian O'Hara, and Kameron Michaels twelfth, ninth, and first, respectively, in a list of the top thirteen runway looks of the season. In 2019, writers for Decider said "Tap That App" was among episodes offering a "string of absolutely bizarre maxi challenges". Sam Brooks ranked "Celebrity Skin" number 141 in The Spinoff's 2019 "definitive ranking" of all 162 lip-sync contests on the show to date. Bernado Sim ranked Mayhem Miller's lip-sync performance number 18 in Out's 2022 list of the "best lip syncs with stunts in 'RuPaul's Drag Race' herstory".

== See also ==
- Courtney Love filmography
