= You Know My Name (Courtney Love song) =

Single by Courtney Love
- A-side: "Wedding Day"
- Released: May 4, 2014
- Recorded: 2014
- Studio: Atrium Studios in Calabasas, California
- Genre: Punk rock; hardcore punk
- Length: 2:44
- Label: Cherry Forever
- Songwriters: Courtney Love; Micko Larkin; Shawn Dailey
- Producer: Michael Beinhorn

Courtney Love singles chronology
"Hold On to Me" (2004)	"You Know My Name" / "Wedding Day" (2014)	"Miss Narcissist" (2015)

"You Know My Name" is a song by the American alternative rock musician Courtney Love. It was released on May 4, 2014 on Cherry Forever Records, packaged as a double A-side single with the song "Wedding Day".

Featuring themes of public fame and notoriety, "You Know My Name" was written by Love, guitarist Micko Larkin and bassist Shawn Dailey. It was recorded alongside "Wedding Day" at Atrium Studios in Calabasas, California in early 2014 with producer Michael Beinhorn. The single was released on Love's own independent record label Cherry Forever, under license to Kobalt Label Services, and was supported by a well received eight-date tour of the United Kingdom.

Critical reception to "You Know My Name" was largely positive and the single placed in the UK Independent Singles Chart upon its release. An accompanying music video, directed by Maximilla Lukacs, features Love performing "You Know My Name" as a character abandoned on her wedding day inspired by Miss Havisham from Charles Dickens' 1861 novel Great Expectations.

== Origin and recording ==
"You Know My Name" was written by Courtney Love, guitarist Micko Larkin and bassist Shawn Dailey. It was recorded in early 2014 at Atrium Studios in Calabasas, California and produced by Michael Beinhorn, who had previously produced Celebrity Skin (1998) and Nobody's Daughter (2010) by Love's former band Hole. The song features Mötley Crüe member Tommy Lee on drums.

In a television interview with BBC Breakfast, Love noted that the main themes of "You Know My Name" were fame and notoriety, referring to it as "a really simple, sweary, fast in-your-face song" about her public reputation. She described how she was inspired to write the song after repeated listens to The Rolling Stones' 1968 song "Sympathy for the Devil", which left her "feeling quite like a rock villainess".

== Release and reception ==
"You Know My Name" is Love's first solo release in a decade, since America's Sweetheart (2004) and its two supporting singles: "Mono" and "Hold On to Me". The song premiered on Steve Lamacq's radio programme on BBC Radio 6 Music on April 22, 2014 ahead of Love's British tour, and was later made available for stream on Love's official YouTube channel. "You Know My Name" was released as a double A-side single, also featuring the song "Wedding Day", on May 4, 2014 on Cherry Forever Records, under exclusive license to Kobalt Label Services. It was made available worldwide as a digital download on iTunes, and a neon pink 7" limited to 3,000 copies is due to be released in the United Kingdom on May 26, 2014.

Love supported the release of "You Know My Name"/"Wedding Day" with an eight-date tour of the United Kingdom, beginning at the O_{2} Shepherds Bush Empire in London on May 11 and concluding at Think Tank in Newcastle upon Tyne on May 22. On the opening night of the tour, Love debuted "You Know My Name" live and received warm reviews from various publications. "You Know My Name"/"Wedding Day" entered the UK Independent Singles Chart at number 34, as well as the Independent Singles Breakers Chart at number 8.

Critical reception to "You Know My Name" was largely favorable. TIME writer Nolan Feeney described the song as "a thrilling punk workout" and noted that "just when the track seems to reach its peak, it ignites with a forceful hook: 'All this world is burning up / It's time that you retire.' Good thing she hasn't." Writing for Stereogum, Michael Nelson referred to "You Know My Name" as "old-school, no-frills, no-fat punk rock with a huge, knockout hook on the chorus and a perfectly shredded vocal performance that only gets stronger as it gets more ragged", adding "this … is Courtney at her best". Chris Martins of Spin said that "it's the perfect mix of punk angst, metal shred, and melodic might" and concluded the song was "a bona fide ripper", while Rolling Stone surmised that the song "finds Love in full beast mode" and Entertainment Weekly drew comparisons between Love and Bob Dylan.

== Music video ==
Love in the "You Know My Name" video; the imagery and Love's fashion design drew comparisons to the 2006 film Marie Antoinette

Love originally planned for the music video to "You Know My Name" to be directed by David LaChapelle. Love had a budget set aside for the video which subsequently "took a big hit" and she was unable to afford LaChapelle. After considering Steven Klein as a potential director, Love choose Maximilla Lukacs to direct the video.

Lukacs shot directed the music video for "You Know My Name" in April 2014. Love shared updates from the video shoot on various social media accounts, including Instagram where she uploaded teaser clips describing the themes of the video. Love stated that her intention was to "look like an old Victorian doll crossed with a Dickensian character called Miss Havisham, who got abandoned on her wedding day at the altar and lived to be a hundred". The character portrayed by Love is represented by Lukacs' recurring motif of "hyper-feminine" and "surreal" imagery, which Love "literally destroys". Love stated that she "thought it would be really for [Lukacs]" to derive from her standard directing style as "[she] has never done really hard-core before".

The music video was released on YouTube on May 6, 2014. It was preceded by a short behind the scenes video chronicling the filming of "You Know My Name". In the video, Love "wrecks a fancy room while wearing a white dress and white makeup, surrounded by rose petals" while performing parts of the song on a black Fender Jaguar HH. Stereogum writer Michael Nelson commented that the video's imagery was reminiscent of Sofia Coppola's 2006 film Marie Antoinette, while Jacques Peterson of PopDust stated that the "glitter, disco balls, broken glass, and vintage couture" featured in the video "walks the same thin line between decadence and destruction" that featured in Hole's earlier music videos.

== Track listing ==
- Digital download and 7"
1. "You Know My Name" (Love, Larkin, Dailey) – 2:44
2. "Wedding Day" (Love, Larkin) – 3:03

== Credits and personnel ==
Technical personnel credits adapted from "You Know My Name"/"Wedding Day"'s liner notes.

Musicians

- Courtney Love – vocals, guitar
- Micko Larkin – guitar
- Shawn Dailey – bass
- Tommy Lee – drums

Technical

- Michael Beinhorn – production, engineering, mixing
- Mike Balboa – engineering, Pro Tools editing, mixing
- Smiley Sean – engineering, Pro Tools editing
- Peter Lyman – mastering

== Charts ==
Chart (2014)	Peak position
UK Independent Singles Chart	34
UK Independent Singles Breakers Chart	8
US Hot Rock Songs	27

== Release history ==
Region	Date	Format	Label	Catalog
Worldwide	May 4, 2014	Digital download	Cherry Forever	CFR001
United Kingdom	May 26, 2014	7"	Cherry Forever	CFR001VL
