= Hold On to Me (Courtney Love song) =

Single by Courtney Love

from the album America's Sweetheart
- Released: March 29, 2004
- Recorded: 2003
- Studio: Studio Miraval (Le Val)
- Genre: Alternative rock
- Length: 3:45
- Label: Virgin
- Songwriter: Courtney Love
- Producer: Matt Serletic

Courtney Love singles chronology
| "Mono" (2004) | "Hold On to Me" (2004) | "You Know My Name" / "Wedding Day" (2014) |

"Hold On to Me" is a song by American singer Courtney Love from her debut studio album America's Sweetheart (2004). It was released as the second single from the album on March 30, 2004, by Virgin Records. The single was released nearly a month after the album's lead single, "Mono", failing to garner any notable commercial success.

== Background and production ==
"Hold on to Me" was one of the earliest songs written for America's Sweetheart, known to be written and performed as early as 2001. The song was one of the few that were featured on the original version of America's Sweetheart, prior to its rerecording. The final version of the song – as featured on the album and single release – was recorded at Studio Miraval, a chateau in the south of France, in 2003.

The single never saw a proper release due to events in Love's personal life that prevented her from promoting the single and making a video for it. Love's former Hole bandmate, Samantha Maloney, played drums on the track, and the song was on the list of the album's tracks that weren't registered for copyright collect, according to BMI and ASCAP's websites, however, this was resolved in 2006.

== Track listing ==
- Limited CD single and promo CD
1. "Hold on to Me" (radio edit)
2. "Hold on to Me" (album version)

== Charts ==
| Chart (2004) | Peak position |
|---|---|
| US Alternative Airplay (Billboard) | 39 |

== Release history ==
| Region | Date | Formats(s) | Label(s) | Ref(s). |
|---|---|---|---|---|
| United States | March 29, 2004 | Alternative radio | Virgin | |
