= Goofyfoot =

EP by Phranc
- Released: August 18, 1995
- Recorded: Olympia, Washington in 1995
- Genre: Surf rock, folk rock
- Length: 15:34
- Label: Kill Rock Stars
- Producer: Warren Bruleigh, Phranc

Phranc chronology
Positively Phranc (1991)	Goofyfoot (1995)	Milkman (1998)

Professional ratings
Review scores
Source	Rating
Allmusic	link
Rolling Stone	(not rated) - January 1996

Goofyfoot is an EP by folk singer-songwriter Phranc, released in 1995.

Recorded in Olympia, Washington with session musicians including Donna Dresch and Tobi Vail, as well as members of Satan's Pilgrims, Goofyfoot is an independent tribute to the surfer-punk ethic of the Californian coast. It covers "Mrs. Brown You've Got a Lovely Daughter" and "Ode to Billie Joe" as well as the popular live favourite "Bulldagger Swagger".

== Track listing ==
1. "Surferdyke Pal" (Phranc) – 2:38
2. "Mrs. Brown You've Got a Lovely Daughter" (Trevor Peacock) – 3:11
3. "Bulldagger Swagger" (Phranc) – 2:49
4. "Ode to Billy Joe" (Bobbie Gentry) – 4:20
5. "Goofyfoot" (Phranc) – 2:46

== Personnel ==
- Phranc - Producer, vocals, guitar
- Warren Bruleigh - Producer
- Kaia Kangaroo - Guitar
- Dave Pilgrim - Guitar
- Scott Pilgrim - Guitar
- Donna Dresch - Bass guitar
- John Pilgrim - Bass guitar
- Patty Schemel - Drums
- Tobi Vail - Drums
- John Goodmanson - Engineer
- Tom Smurdon - Assistant engineer
- Greg Calbi - Mastering
- Carol Chen - Art direction, design

== Release details ==
Country	Date	Label	Format	Catalog
	1995	Kill Rock Stars		KRS 233
