= Live Through This Tour =

1994–95 concert tour by Hole

- Tour by Hole
- Poster for 1994 date at the Hollywood Palladium
- Start date: August 26, 1994
- End date: September 3, 1995

Hole concert chronology
- Pretty on the Inside Tour (1991–1992); Live Through This Tour (1994–1995); Beautiful Monsters Tour (1998–1999)

The Live Through This Tour was an international concert tour by the American alternative rock band Hole, spanning late 1994 through 1995, in support of their second studio album, Live Through This. The tour included dates in 14 countries and was widely documented in the media due to frontwoman Courtney Love's raucous stage behavior throughout, which divided critics.

Initially planned to begin in the early summer of 1994, the tour was postponed after the death of the band's bassist, Kristen Pfaff, on June 16 that year. In August, the band hired Canadian bassist Melissa Auf der Maur, and commenced the tour, with their first date being the 1994 Reading Festival. The tour was also highly anticipated as it marked Love's first public performance since the suicide of her husband, Kurt Cobain, in April. During the first week of the band's North American dates, Hole opened for Nine Inch Nails (who were simultaneously on the Self Destruct Tour) before proceeding as a headlining act. Supporting acts included Madder Rose, the Melvins, and Veruca Salt.

The tour was subject of a series of legal troubles for Love as well, involving physical altercations between herself, crowd members, and other musicians. In addition to Love receiving death threats at some performances, she was arrested twice during the tour, and pleaded guilty to punching Kathleen Hanna at a Lollapalooza date. She was also unsuccessfully sued by two male concertgoers who alleged she struck them during a performance in Florida in March 1995.

== Overview ==
Days before the release of Hole's second album, Live Through This, frontwoman Courtney Love's husband, Nirvana frontman Kurt Cobain, committed suicide in their Seattle home. The Live Through This Tour was slated to begin in the summer of 1994, but was temporarily halted after the death of the band's bassist, Kristen Pfaff, of a heroin overdose.

On August 19, 1994—one week before the band's scheduled debut performance at the Reading Festival—the group hired Melissa Auf der Maur, a Canadian bassist from Montreal. The first week of the tour after the Reading Festival had Hole as a supporting act for Nine Inch Nails before they embarked as a headliner for the following concerts. In 1995, the band made appearances at several Big Day Out festival dates, and went on to join Lollapalooza in North America, performing with the traveling festival throughout the summer of 1995 alongside Sonic Youth and Cypress Hill.

== Reception ==
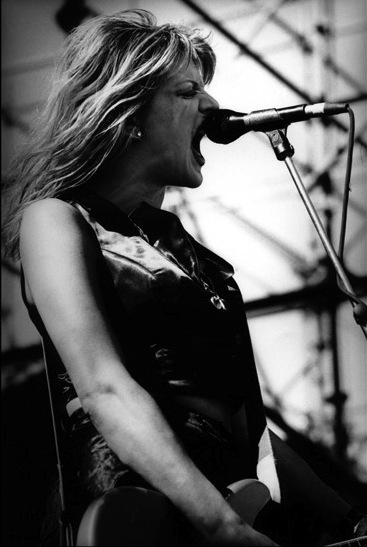
Love performing with Hole at the 1995 Big Day Out, Melbourne

Critical response to the Live Through This Tour varied, with some local critics lambasting Love's performances. Reviewing their opening performance of the tour at the 1994 Reading Festival, critic John Peel wrote that Love's disheveled appearance "would have drawn whistles of astonishment in Bedlam," and that her performance "verged on the heroic ... Love steered her band through a set which dared you to pity either her recent history or that of the band ... the band teetered on the edge of chaos, generating a tension which I cannot remember having felt before from any stage." New York Times critic Jon Pareles gave a favorable review of the band's fall 1994 concert in New York City, describing the music as "fierce, exploding from restrained verses to vehement choruses."

Reviewing a September 26, 1994 performance in Asbury Park, New Jersey, Eric Deggans lambasted the band, writing that "Love's seeming disinterest in relating to the crowd or delivering a show ultimately sabotaged what could have been a legendary experience... Love and her musicians charged through the songs with an urgency that suited their angry, disillusioned message." Journalist Natasha Kassulke, reviewing an October 1994 performance in Madison, Wisconsin, criticized Love's behavior during the concert, writing that "Ninety minutes was all it took to reduce Courtney Love, the angry bleached-blonde singer... into a half-naked, modern day Ophelia."

Jon Casmir, reviewing a January 1995 date in Sydney, Australia, similarly found Love's onstage antics offensive, noting that she "picked up one of the plastic baby dolls strewn around the stage, mimed giving birth, then threw it straight into the audience," though he conceded that "in all likelihood, this was one of those shows which will burn into myth, the subject of reminiscence and folklore for a long time to come." Casmir concluded that "For someone who wants to avoid the circus that surrounds the Cobain mythology, [Love] went out of her way to give the gawkers a freak show."

Love's tendency to ramble between songs was noted by numerous reviewers. Drummer Patty Schemel recalled: "It was hard [for Courtney] to continually try to push those feelings down. Certain things would remind her [of Kurt], and a lot of times onstage it would come out."

In a retrospective, VH1 referred to the tour as "a series of emotionally-charged shows that were part therapy, part eulogy, and completely legendary."

== Legal and safety troubles ==
At the band's October 1994 appearance at the WFNX Birthday Bash event in Boston, the radio station received an anonymous call from a person threatening to shoot Love to death onstage during the event. Prior to the concert's commencement, a man was ejected from the club after a gun was found in his possession.

The tour went on to garner significant media attention, largely related to a series of subsequent legal troubles involving Love; in January 1995, en route to Melbourne to commence the band's Australian tour dates, she was arrested for disrupting a Qantas Airways flight after getting into an argument with a stewardess. Six months later, on July 4, 1995 at a Lollapalooza date in George, Washington, Love punched Bikini Kill singer Kathleen Hanna in the face after alleging she had made a joke about her daughter. She pleaded guilty to an assault charge and was sentenced to anger management classes. On July 31, Love walked offstage in the middle of a set after someone threw shotgun shells at her during the band's Lollapalooza performance in Burgettstown, Pennsylvania, suggestive of her husband, Cobain's, suicide.

Further media attention came in November 1995 when two male teenagers attempted to sue Love for allegedly punching them during a concert they attended in Orlando, Florida in March 1995. The judge ultimately dismissed the case on grounds that the teens "weren't exposed to any greater amount of violence than could reasonably be expected at an alternative rock concert." Commenting on her legal troubles and performances during this period, Love stated that she was abusing Rohypnol at the time, and could not recall much of the tour.

== Other acts ==
Supporting

- Veruca Salt
- Melvins
- Wool
- Milk Money
- Helium
- Marilyn Manson
- Madder Rose
- Miranda Sex Garden

Supported

- Nine Inch Nails (August 29, 1994–September 5, 1994 U.S. dates)

== Tour dates ==
Date	City	Country	Venue	Ref.
Europe
August 26, 1994	Reading	England	Reading Festival	
North America
August 29, 1994	Cleveland	United States	The Nautica (Note: Supporting Nine Inch Nails on their Self Destruct Tour.)	
August 30, 1994	Cleveland	United States	The Nautica	
September 1, 1994	Toronto	Canada	Phoenix Theatre	
September 2, 1994	Clarkston	United States	Pine Knob Music Theatre	
September 3, 1994	Chicago	United States	UIC Pavilion	
September 5, 1994	Saint Paul	United States	Roy Wilkins Auditorium	
September 11, 1994	Seattle	United States	Mercer Arena	
September 14, 1994	Seattle	United States	Moore Theatre	
September 21, 1994	New York City	United States	The Academy of Music	
September 23, 1994	Providence	United States	Lupo's Heartbreak Hotel	
September 24, 1994	Asbury Park	United States	The Stone Pony	
September 26, 1994	Philadelphia	United States	Trocadero Theatre	
September 27, 1994	Charlottesville	United States	The Crossroads	
September 28, 1994	Washington, D.C.	United States	WUST Music Hall	
September 30, 1994	Virginia Beach	United States	The Abyss	
October 1, 1994	Blacksburg	United States	Commonwealth Ballroom	
October 2, 1994	Atlanta	United States	The Masquerade	
October 4, 1994	Pittsburgh	United States	The Metropol	
October 6, 1994	Montreal	Canada	The Spectrum	
October 7, 1994	Boston	United States	The Avalon	
October 8, 1994	New Haven	United States	Toad's Place	
October 10, 1994	Rochester	United States	Horizontal Boogie Bar	
October 11, 1994	Buffalo	United States	The Marquee	
October 14, 1994	Columbus	United States	Newport Music Hall	
October 15, 1994	Detroit	United States	Saint Andrew's Hall	
October 16, 1994	Cincinnati	United States	Bogart's	
October 18, 1994	Indianapolis	United States	Eastwood Theatre	
October 19, 1994	Louisville	United States	Thunderdome	
October 21, 1994	Chicago	United States	The Metro	
October 22, 1994	Madison	United States	Paramount Music Hall	
October 23, 1994	Minneapolis	United States	First Avenue	
October 25, 1994	Columbia	United States	The Blue Note	
October 26, 1994	St. Louis	United States	Mississippi Nights	
October 28, 1994	Memphis	United States	New Daisy Theatre	
October 29, 1994	New Orleans	United States	Rendon Inn	
October 31, 1994	Houston	United States	Numbers	
November 1, 1994	Austin	United States	Liberty Lunch	
November 2, 1994	Dallas	United States	Deep Ellum	
November 4, 1994	El Paso	United States	Metropolis	
November 5, 1994	Tempe	United States	Minder Binder's	
November 6, 1994	Las Vegas	United States	Huntridge Theatre	
November 8, 1994	San Diego	United States	SOMA	
November 9, 1994	Los Angeles	United States	Hollywood Palladium	
November 12, 1994	Palo Alto	United States	The Edge	
November 13, 1994	San Francisco	United States	The Fillmore	
November 14, 1994	Seattle	United States	Moore Theatre	
November 15, 1994	Vancouver	Canada	Commodore Ballroom	
November 16, 1994	Portland	United States	La Luna	
November 30, 1994	Minneapolis	United States	Target Center	
December 1, 1994	Chicago	United States	UIC Pavilion (Note: Twisted Christmas event.)	
December 2, 1994	Cleveland	United States	Agora Theatre and Ballroom	
December 4, 1994	Boston	United States	Orpheum Theatre	
December 5, 1994	New York City	United States	Madison Square Garden (Note: Z100 Jingle Ball event.)	
December 8, 1994	San Jose	United States	San Jose State Event Center (Note: K.O.M.E. "Almost Acoustic Christmas" event.)	
December 9, 1994	Berkeley	United States	Berkeley Community Theatre (Note: Live 105 Green Christmas Concert.)	
December 10, 1994	Los Angeles	United States	Universal Amphitheatre (Note: KROQ Almost Acoustic Christmas event.)	
December 12, 1994	San Diego	United States	San Diego Civic Theatre (Note: 91X Acoustic X-Mas event.)	
Australia
January 13, 1995	Melbourne	Australia	The Palace Complex	
January 14, 1995	Sydney	Australia	Selina's Coogee Bay Hotel	
January 16, 1995	Fremantle	Australia	Metropolis Fremantle	
January 18, 1995	Adelaide	Australia	Thebarton Theatre	
New Zealand
January 20, 1995	Auckland	New Zealand	Mount Smart Stadium (Note: Big Day Out festival date.)	
Australia
January 22, 1995	Melbourne	Australia	Melbourne Showgrounds	
January 24, 1995	Brisbane	Australia	The Roxy Theatre	
January 26, 1995	Sydney	Australia	Sydney Showground	
Asia
January 29, 1995	Osaka	Japan	Shinsaibashi Club Quattro	
January 30, 1995	Nagoya	Japan	Nagoya Club Quattro	
January 31, 1995	Tokyo	Japan	Shinjuku Liquid Room	
February 2, 1995	Tokyo	Japan	Shinjuku Liquid Room	
February 3, 1995	Tokyo	Japan	Shinjuku Liquid Room	
North America
February 15, 1995	New York City	United States	Roseland Ballroom	
February 16, 1995	New York City	United States	Irving Plaza (Note: Lifebeat benefit concert with John McEnroe and Blind Melon.)	
March 9, 1995	Raleigh	United States	Ritz Raleigh	
March 10, 1995	Charlotte	United States	Ritz Capri	
March 12, 1995	Tampa	United States	USF Special Events Center	
March 13, 1995	Fort Lauderdale	United States	The Edge	
March 14, 1995	Orlando	United States	The Edge	
March 16, 1995	Memphis	United States	New Daisy Theatre	
March 19, 1995	Denver	United States	Mammoth Events Center	
March 20, 1995	Salt Lake City	United States	Saltair Pavilion	
Europe
March 31, 1995	Paris	France	Le Bataclan	
April 4, 1995	Toulouse	France	Le Bikini	
April 5, 1995	Barcelona	Spain	Sala Zeleste	
April 6, 1995	Madrid	Spain	Sala Aqualung	
April 8, 1995	Montpellier	France	Rockstore	
April 10, 1995	Milan	Italy	City Square	
April 13, 1995	Zürich	Switzerland	Rote Fabrik	
April 15, 1995	Munich	Germany	Terminal 1, Munich-Riem_Airport	
April 16, 1995	Stuttgart	Germany	LKA Longhorn	
April 17, 1995	Frankfurt	Germany	Volksbildungsheim	
April 19, 1995	Hamburg	Germany	Docks	
April 21, 1995	Cologne	Germany	Live Music Hall	
April 22, 1995	Berlin	Germany	Tempodrom	
April 24, 1995	Amsterdam	Netherlands	Paradiso	
April 25, 1995	Brussels	Belgium	Luna Theatre	
April 26, 1995	London	England	Virgin Megastore (Note: Acoustic in-store set.)	
April 27, 1995	Wolverhampton	England	Wolverhampton Civic Hall	
April 29, 1995	Sheffield	England	Octagon Centre	
April 30, 1995	Manchester	England	Manchester Academy 1	
May 1, 1995	Glasgow	Scotland	Barrowland Ballroom	
May 3, 1995	Nottingham	England	Rock City	
May 4, 1995	London	England	Brixton Academy	
May 6, 1995	Bordeaux	France	Rock School Barbey	
May 7, 1995	Rennes	France	L'Espace	
May 8, 1995	Paris	France	Le Bataclan	
May 10, 1995	London	England	Shepherd's Bush Empire	
North America
June 17, 1995	Irvine	United States	Irvine Meadows Amphitheatre (Note: KROQ Weenie Roast 1995.)	
July 4, 1995	George	United States	The Gorge Amphitheatre	
July 5, 1995	Vancouver	Canada	Thunderbird Stadium	
July 8, 1995	Greenwood Village	United States	Coors Amphitheatre	
July 10, 1995	Bonner Springs	United States	Sandstone Amphitheatre	
July 11, 1995	Maryland Heights	United States	Riverport Amphitheatre	
July 12, 1995	Noblesville	United States	Deer Creek Music Center	
July 14, 1995	Columbus	United States	Polaris Amphitheatre	
July 15, 1995	Tinley Park	United States	New World Music Theater	
July 18, 1995	Cincinnati	United States	Riverbend Music Center	
July 19, 1995	Independence Township	United States	Pine Knob Theatre	
July 20, 1995	Clarkston	United States	Pine Knob Music Theatre	
July 22, 1995	Cuyahoga Falls	United States	Blossom Music Center	
July 23, 1995	Barrie	Canada	Molson Park	
July 25, 1995	Mansfield	United States	Great Woods Center	
July 26, 1995	Hartford	United States	Meadows Music Theater	
July 28, 1995	New York City	United States	Downing Stadium	
July 29, 1995	New York City	United States	Downing Stadium	
July 30, 1995	Camden	United States	Blockbuster-Sony Center	
July 31, 1995	Burgettstown	United States	Star-Lake Amphitheater	
August 2, 1995	Ranson	United States	Charles Town Racetrack	
August 5, 1995	Atlanta	United States	Lakewood Amphitheatre	
August 6, 1995	Raleigh	United States	Walnut Creek Amphitheatre	
August 9, 1995	Austin	United States	South Park Meadows	
August 10, 1995	Dallas	United States	Starplex Amphitheatre	
August 12, 1995	Phoenix	United States	Desert Sky Pavilion	
August 14, 1995	Irvine	United States	Irvine Meadows Amphitheatre	
August 17, 1995	Sacramento	United States	Cal Expo Amphitheatre	
August 18, 1995	Mountain View	United States	Shoreline Amphitheatre	
Europe
August 25, 1995	Reading	England	Little John's Farm	
August 26, 1995	Hasselt	Belgium	Domein Kiewit (Note: Pukkelpop festival.)	
North America
September 3, 1995	Tuktoyaktuk	Canada	Molson Polar Beach Party (Note: Promotional event for Molson Brewery.)	

== Sources ==
- "Courtney Love". Behind the Music. Viacom Media Networks. June 21, 2010. VH1.
