= Brother Clyde =

American alternative rock supergroup

- Origin: Los Angeles, California
- Genres: Alternative rock
- Years active: 2009–2010
- Labels: Buena Vista, Fontana
- Past members: Billy Ray Cyrus; Jeffrey Steele; John Waite; Phil Vassar; Jamie Miller; Dan Knight; Dave Henning; Samantha Maloney
- Website: myspace.com/brotherclyde

Brother Clyde was an alternative rock musical supergroup, formed in 2009 by country music singer Billy Ray Cyrus. The band initially was to consist of Cyrus, Jeffrey Steele, John Waite and Phil Vassar. However, in June 2010, Cyrus announced a new line-up for the band, as well as the release of its debut single, "Lately." The group released its self-titled debut album on August 10, 2010.

== History ==
Brother Clyde was formed in late 2009, when country music singer-songwriter Jeffrey Steele, pop singer John Waite, and country singer Phil Vassar recruited Billy Ray Cyrus into the band. The supergroup was announced through Cyrus' Twitter account, and reported on several music blogs.

However, in June 2010, Cyrus announced the new line-up for the band, excluding its three original members, which has led to some criticism due to the fact that the original members recruited Cyrus to the band, which has led some people in the music community to believe that Cyrus took control of the band. Cyrus also released information on their debut single, "Lately", as well as the upcoming release of its self-titled debut album, Brother Clyde.

"Lately" was released to radio on June 29, 2010, and the group's debut album was released on August 10, 2010, via Fontana Records. Cyrus produced the album himself, and wrote or co-wrote most of the songs with a "rock-n-roll attitude". The music video for "Lately" premiered on July 20, 2010. Cyrus also directed the music video.

To promote the release of the album, Brother Clyde performed "Lately" on the August 3, 2010 episode of Lopez Tonight.

== Band members ==
- Billy Ray Cyrus (vocals, guitar; 2009–2010)
- Jamie Miller (guitar; 2010)
- Dan Knight (guitar; 2010)
- Dave Henning (bass; 2010)
- Samantha Maloney (drums; 2010)

== Discography ==
=== Studio albums ===
Title	Album details	Peak positions
Title	Album details	US Heat
Brother Clyde	Release date: August 10, 2010; Label: Fontana/Buena Vista; Formats: CD, music download	40

=== Singles ===
Year	Single	Album
2010	"Lately" (featuring King Phaze)	Brother Clyde

=== Music videos ===
Year	Video	Director
2010	"Lately"	Billy Ray Cyrus
