= Upset (band) =

American rock/punk band

- Origin: Los Angeles, California, United States
- Genres: Punk rock Pop punk
- Years active: 2013–2019
- Label: Lauren Records Don Giovanni
- Past members: Ali Koehler; Lauren Freeman; Patty Schemel; Nicole Snyder; Jenn Prince; Chris Juarez; Rachel Gagliardi

Upset was an American rock band from Los Angeles, formed in 2013. The band originally consisted of Ali Koehler on lead vocals and rhythm guitar, Jenn Prince on lead guitar and backing vocals, Chris Juarez on bass, and Patty Schemel on drums. After the recording and release of their debut album, She's Gone, Prince and Juarez departed the band to work on other projects, with Lauren Freeman and Rachel Gagliardi respectively replacing them. Koehler was the former drummer of the bands Best Coast and Vivian Girls. Schemel rose to prominence as the drummer of Hole and also played for the band Death Valley Girls. The band released their debut album on Don Giovanni Records on October 29, 2013. They released two further albums, 76 in 2015 and a self-titled record in 2019 before quietly disbanding. Koehler rejoined a reunited Vivian Girls that same year, who also released a new album in 2019.

== Discography ==
=== Albums ===
Year	Title	Label	Format
2013	She's Gone	Don Giovanni Records	12" vinyl LP, CD, Digital
2015	76	Lauren Records	10" vinyl, CS, Digital
2019	Upset	Lauren Records	12” vinyl LP, Digital
