= Pretty on the Inside Tour =

1991 concert tour by Hole

- Tour by Hole
- Flyer for Toronto date at The Rivoli
- Start date: June 1991
- End date: December 22, 1991

Hole concert chronology
- Pretty on the Inside Tour (1991); Live Through This Tour (1994–1995)

The Pretty on the Inside Tour was the first international concert tour by American alternative rock band Hole in promotion of their debut album, Pretty on the Inside. The tour began in the summer of 1991, and concluded in December of that year. The tour largely had Hole as a supporting act, with them performing as an opener for Mudhoney's European tour, as well as The Smashing Pumpkins in the United States.

== Overview ==
In anticipation of the release of Hole's debut studio album, Pretty on the Inside (1991), the group embarked on an international concert tour in promotion of the record. The tour began in July 1991 in Los Angeles. For the first European leg of the tour, Hole was a supporting act for Mudhoney. The band returned to North America in the fall and toured in the United States and Canada before returning to Europe in November 1991.

The band opened for Nirvana at several European dates, including in Ghent, Belgium and Nijmegen, Netherlands. During this time, frontwoman Courtney Love became romantically involved with Nirvana frontman Kurt Cobain; the two had previously been acquainted in May 1991.

The band returned to the United States in mid-December 1991, appearing as a supporting act for the West Coast tour of The Smashing Pumpkins, supporting their debut album, Gish.

== Reception ==
Sam Batra of The Guardian wrote of the band's London date in December 1991: "There's no pretending that [Love] is in control. This is the sound of living on the edge and consequently working it out in splurges of furious noise seems to be the only articulation that has any authenticity," adding that "it's as if every flurry of noise unravels itself, breaks down as it struggles within the confines of a genre that is predominately male. Hole will burn themselves out. See them before they lose it willfully." Adam Sweeting, reviewing the University of London Union performance, noted that the band's songs seem to be "teetering on the edge of collapse, [while] Love pouts, whispers, and shrieks... the volume of the voice is startling." Richard Cromelin of the Los Angeles Times observed of the band's supporting performance at a Los Angeles Smashing Pumpkins concert that the crowd "didn’t take to Courtney Love’s powerful howls of anguish." At the end of the show, Love "ordered the band to a halt and hurled her guitar to the ground," after which guitarist Eric Erlandson demolished his guitar by smashing it against the floor.

== Other acts ==
Supporting

- Hi Dummy
- Drag
- The Tunnel Frenzies (Manchester International II)
- Daisy Chainsaw
- Therapy?

Supported

- Buffalo Tom
- Dinosaur Jr.
- Mudhoney (August 9–22, 1991 dates)
- Nirvana
- The Smashing Pumpkins (December 16–22, 1991 dates)

== Tour dates ==
Date	City	Country	Venue	Ref.
North America
June 23, 1991	Los Angeles	United States	Hollywood Palladium	
June 28, 1991	Seattle	United States	The Off Ramp	
June 29, 1991	Vancouver	Canada	The Cruel Elephant	
July 1, 1991	Calgary	Canada	Republik	
July 4, 1991	Minneapolis	United States	Uptown Bar	
July 5, 1991	Madison	United States	O’Cayz Corral	
July 6, 1991	Chicago	United States	Avalon Niteclub	
July 7, 1991	Los Angeles	United States	Jabberjaw	
July 8, 1991	Kalamazoo	United States	Club Soda	
July 11, 1991	Montreal	Canada	Les Foufounes Électriques	
July 12, 1991	Boston	United States	The Rathskeller	
July 15, 1991	New York City	United States	CBGB	
July 18, 1991	Philadelphia	United States	Khyber Pass	
July 19, 1991	Hoboken	United States	Maxwell's	
July 20, 1991	Washington, D.C.	United States	The 9:30 Club	
July 22, 1991	Richmond	United States	Twisters	
July 23, 1991	Charlotte	United States	Milestone Club	
July 24, 1991	Athens	United States	40 Watt Club	
July 25, 1991	Atlanta	United States	The Masquerade	
July 31, 1991	Austin	United States	The Cannibal Club	
August 1, 1991	Dallas	United States	Trees	
Europe		United States		
August 9, 1991	Windsor	England	The Old Trout Pub	
August 11, 1991	London	England	Astoria Theatre	
August 12, 1991	London	England	Astoria Theatre	
August 13, 1991	Brighton	England	The Zap	
August 14, 1991	Wolverhampton	England	Wulfrun Hall	
August 15, 1991	Newcastle upon Tyne	England	Riverside	
August 16, 1991	Glasgow	Scotland	Queen Margaret Union	
August 18, 1991	Manchester	England	International II	
August 19, 1991	Bristol	England	Bierkeller Theatre	
August 20, 1991	Sheffield	England	The Leadmill	
August 21, 1991	Birmingham	England	Goldwyns	
August 22, 1991	London	England	New Cross Venue	
North America
October 25, 1991	Los Angeles	United States	The Palace	
October 27, 1991	Los Angeles	United States	The Palace	
October 29, 1991	Chicago	United States	Unknown	
October 30, 1991	Kalamazoo	United States	Club Soda	
November 1, 1991	Toronto	Canada	The Rivoli	
November 6, 1991	Cambridge	United States	Tower Records	
November 7, 1991	Boston	United States	The Rathskeller	
November 8, 1991	New York City	United States	CBGB	
November 9, 1991	Philadelphia	United States	Khyber Pass	
November 11, 1991	Carrboro	United States	Cat's Cradle	
November 15, 1991	Austin	United States	Emo's	
Europe
November 21, 1991	London	England	The Underworld	
November 23, 1991	Ghent	Belgium	Vooruit Concertzaal	
November 24, 1991	Nijmegen	Netherlands	Doornroosje	
November 25, 1991	Nancy	France	Bar La Plage	
November 26, 1991	Paris	France	La Cigale	
November 27, 1991	Villeurbanne	France	Transbordeur	
November 28, 1991	Mezzago	Italy	Bloom	
December 2, 1991	Frankfurt	Germany	Cooky's	(Note: Two further shows were scheduled in Germany on December 20 and 21, 1991, in Dortmund and Bremen, respectively, but were cancelled.)
December 3, 1991	Berlin	Germany	The Loft	(Note: Two further shows were scheduled in Germany on December 20 and 21, 1991, in Dortmund and Bremen, respectively, but were cancelled.)
December 4, 1991	Cologne	Germany	Rose Club	(Note: Two further shows were scheduled in Germany on December 20 and 21, 1991, in Dortmund and Bremen, respectively, but were cancelled.)
December 4, 1991	Hamburg	Germany	Markthalle	(Note: Two further shows were scheduled in Germany on December 20 and 21, 1991, in Dortmund and Bremen, respectively, but were cancelled.)
December 6, 1991	Groningen	Netherlands	Vera	
December 7, 1991	Utrecht	Netherlands	Tivoli	
December 8, 1991	Amsterdam	Netherlands	Melkweg	
December 10, 1991	Newport	Wales	TJ's	
December 11, 1991	Exeter	England	Lemongrove	
December 12, 1991	London	England	University of London Union	
December 13, 1991	Leeds	England	Duchess of York	
December 14, 1991	Glasgow	Scotland	The Mayfair	
December 15, 1991	Manchester	England	The Boardwalk	
North America
December 16, 1991	San Diego	United States	Sound FX	
December 17, 1991	Los Angeles	United States	Whisky a Go Go	
December 19, 1991	San Francisco	United States	I-Beam	
December 20, 1991	Sacramento	United States	Cattle Club	
December 22, 1991	Portland	United States	The Underground	

== Sources ==
- Crawford, Anwen (2014). Hole's Live Through This. 33 1/3. New York: Bloomsbury USA. ISBN 978-1-623-56377-6. OCLC 883749105.
- Prato, Greg (2010). Grunge Is Dead: The Oral History of Seattle Rock Music. Toronto: ECW Press. ISBN 978-1-554-90347-4.
- True, Everett (2006). Nirvana: The Biography. London: Omnibus Press. ISBN 978-0-306-81554-6.
