= Positively Phranc =

Studio album by Phranc
- Released: 1991
- Recorded: 1991
- Genres: Folk, folk punk, punk pop
- Length: 30:42
- Label: Island
- Producers: Warren Bruleigh, Phranc

Phranc chronology
I Enjoy Being a Girl (1989)	Positively Phranc (1991)	Goofyfoot (1995)

Positively Phranc is an album by the American musician Phranc, released in 1991. Phranc promoted the album by touring with Morrissey. Phranc was dropped by Island Records after the album's release.

== Production ==
"Gertrude Stein" is Phranc's cover version of Jonathan Richman's "Pablo Picasso"; D.J. Bonebrake played drums on the song. "Tipton" is a tribute to transgender jazz musician Billy Tipton. "Surfer Girl", a duet with Syd Straw, is a cover of the Beach Boys song. "Outta Here" is about the deaths of friends due to AIDS. Dave Alvin played guitar on "Hitchcock". Two Nice Girls sang on "I'm Not Romantic".

== Critical reception ==
Professional ratings
Review scores
Source	Rating
AllMusic	3/5 stars
Robert Christgau	(choice cut)
The Encyclopedia of Popular Music	3/5 stars
MusicHound Rock: The Essential Album Guide	3.5/5 stars
Martin C. Strong	6/10
The Tampa Tribune	2/4 stars

The Gazette wrote that "Phranc proves that all anyone really needs is six strings and a point of view." The Chicago Tribune opined that Positively Phranc "is miles ahead of her first two albums, offering wit, a sense of balance, musical diversity and polished artistry that simply wasn't there before."

Trouser Press noted that the album "intermittently brings tasteful electric accompaniment into the picture while narrowing the lyrical focus to mostly concentrate on romance." Entertainment Weekly lamented that "Phranc pens ironic little ditties, high on giggles but low on the insights that should come out of a lesbian's daily life in the straight world." Robert Christgau considered "'64 Ford" to be the album's best track.

== Track listing ==
All tracks composed by Phranc; except where indicated

1. "I Like You"
2. "I'm Not Romantic"
3. "'64 Ford"
4. "Hitchcock"
5. "Tipton"
6. "Dress Code"
7. "Why?"
8. "Gertrude Stein" (Jonathan Richman)
9. "Surfer Girl" (Brian Wilson)
10. "Outta Here"

== Personnel ==
- Phranc – Producer, vocals, guitar
- Warren Bruleigh – Producer

== Release details ==
Country	Date	Label	Format	Catalog
	1991	Island	CD	422-848 282-2
			Cassette	422-848 282-4
	1992	PolyGram	CD	848282
