= Folksinger (Phranc album) =

Studio album by Phranc
- Released: 1985
- Recorded: 1985
- Genre: Folk
- Length: 41:06
- Label: Rhino
- Producer: Phranc

Phranc chronology
Folksinger (1985)	I Enjoy Being a Girl (1989)

Folksinger is an album by folk singer-songwriter Phranc, released in 1985.

Phranc's first solo LP fused elements of her punk rock past with acoustic folk music. She covers Bob Dylan's "The Lonesome Death of Hattie Carroll," comments on the image of girl groups ("Everywhere I Go (I Hear the Go Go's)"), and relays the personal tragedy of suicide in "Lifelover."

Folksinger was released on Rhino Records, and was licensed to Island Records in 1990. "Everywhere I Go (I Hear the Go-Go's)" is a bonus track on the Island version.

== Critical reception ==
Professional ratings
Review scores
Source	Rating
AllMusic	4/5 stars
Robert Christgau	A−
The Encyclopedia of Popular Music	3/5 stars
MusicHound Rock: The Essential Album Guide	2.5/5 stars
Spin Alternative Record Guide	9/10

AllMusic wrote that "acoustic folk music had yet to be embraced by the punk/new wave underground, making Folksinger a watershed album." Trouser Press wrote that "Phranc’s not a timeless melodicist, but her wry lyrical observations and attractive singing make Folksinger a fine effort." The New York Times wrote that the songs "tend to be too slight and specific for repeated listening; they don't have the resonances of 'Hattie Carroll.'"

== Track listing ==
All tracks composed by Phranc, except where indicated

1. "One of the Girls" – 4:56
2. "Noguchi" – 2:56
3. "Mary Hooley" – 4:02
4. "Ballad of the Dumb Hairdresser" – 3:24
5. "Caped Crusader" – 2:16
6. "Female Mudwrestling" – 2:12
7. "The Lonesome Death of Hattie Carroll" (Bob Dylan) – 4:26
8. "Amazons" – 2:34
9. "Liar Liar" – 1:58
10. "Handicapped" – 1:30
11. "Carolyn" – 4:27
12. "Lifelover" – 2:36
13. "Everywhere I Go (I Hear the Go Go's)" – 2:46

== Personnel ==
- Phranc – producer, vocals, guitar

== Release details ==
Country	Date	Label	Format	Catalog
	1985	Island	CD	422-846 358-2
			LP	422-846 358-1
			cassette	422-846 358-4
	1990	PolyGram	CD	846358
