= I Enjoy Being a Girl (album) =

Studio album by Phranc
- Released: 1989
- Recorded: 1989
- Genres: Folk, folk rock
- Length: 34:56
- Label: Island
- Producer: Victor DeLorenzo

Phranc chronology
Folksinger (1985)	I Enjoy Being a Girl (1989)	Positively Phranc (1991)

I Enjoy Being a Girl is an album by the American musician Phranc, released in 1989. She supported the album with a North American tour.

== Production ==
The album was produced by Victor DeLorenzo. "I Enjoy Being a Girl" is a cover of the 1958 Rodgers and Hammerstein composition from Flower Drum Song. "M-A-R-T-I-N-A" is about Martina Navratilova. "Bloodbath" criticizes Ronald Reagan and Margaret Thatcher. "Myriam and Esther" is dedicated to Phranc's grandmothers. "Rodeo Parakeet" is about Phranc's bird that enjoys riding on dogs. "Toy Time" is a tribute to Toys "R" Us.

The album cover art was in part inspired by a photo of Alice Faye. Orson Bean wrote the liner notes.

== Critical reception ==
Professional ratings
Review scores
Source	Rating
AllMusic	4.5/5 stars
Robert Christgau	B
The Encyclopedia of Popular Music	3/5 stars
Houston Chronicle	4/5 stars
Orlando Sentinel	4/5 stars
Spin Alternative Record Guide	6/10

The Calgary Herald determined that the "heavy-handed protest anthems are the album's weaker entries." The Globe and Mail deemed the album "a delightful piece of work: funny, committed, romantic and charming."

The Washington Post wrote that Phranc "has a warm but not particularly lovely voice, and her strumming is basic at best, but she's a folk singer in the true sense of the word—she seizes her inspiration of the moment and makes music about it." The Houston Chronicle praised the "earnest, endearing quality not unlike Jonathan Richman."

AllMusic wrote that "'Myriam and Esther', a traditional folk ballad with a distinctly female perspective, is the type of earnest song that only Phranc seems able to pull off in post-modern times."

== Track listing ==
All tracks composed by Phranc; except where indicated

1. "Folksinger" – 2:05
2. "I Enjoy Being a Girl" (Oscar Hammerstein, Richard Rodgers) – 3:16
3. "Double Decker Bed" – 2:02
4. "Bloodbath" – 2:54
5. "Individuality" – 2:31
6. "Rodeo Parakeet" – 3:01
7. "Take Off Your Swastika" – 3:30
8. "Toy Time" – 2:34
9. "M-A-R-T-I-N-A" – 2:36
10. "Myriam and Esther" – 3:41
11. "Ballad of Lucy + Ted" – 4:19
12. "Moonlight Becomes You" (Johnny Burke, Jimmy Van Heusen) – 2:27

== Personnel ==
- Phranc – producer, vocals, guitar
- Victor DeLorenzo – producer
- Connie Grauer– backing vocals, arranger, keyboards
- Jimmy Eanelli – bass guitar, 12-string guitar
- Brian Ritchie – mandolin
- Kim Zick – percussion, drums
- Scott Leonard – engineer

== Release details ==
Country	Date	Label	Format	Catalog
	1989	Island	CD	422–842 579-2
			LP	422–842 579-1
			Cassette	422-842-579-4
	1990	PolyGram	CD	842579
