= Antiheroine (film) =

2026 documentary film

- Directed by: James Hall; Edward Lovelace
- Produced by: Melanie Archer; Jon Lullo; Julia Nottingham; Hattie Bridges Webb
- Cinematography: Magda Kowalczyk
- Edited by: Jinx Godfrey; Daniel Lapira; Dan Setford
- Music by: Nikky French
- Production company: Dorothy Street Pictures
- Release date: January 27, 2026 (Sundance)
- Running time: 98 minutes
- Countries: United States; United Kingdom
- Language: English

Antiheroine is a 2026 documentary film which explores the life of musician Courtney Love since her 2019 move to London, focusing on her sobriety and newly-recorded music. It was directed by James Hall and Edward Lovelace.

== Reception ==
Metacritic, which uses a weighted average, assigned the film a score of 71 out of 100, based on four critics, indicating "generally favorable" reviews.

In a positive review, David Rooney of The Hollywood Reporter wrote, "In allowing their subject to tell her own story, Lovelace and Hall make it clear that Love refuses to see herself as a victim. She owns the charges of being abrasive, rude, scrappy, ferociously ambitious and a complicated figure in music history."

Chase Hutchinson of TheWrap wrote that the film is "thoughtful" and "engaging".
