= Miss Narcissist =

Single by Courtney Love
- B-side: "Killer Radio"
- Released: May 18, 2015
- Genre: Alternative rock
- Length: 3:09
- Label: Ghost Ramp
- Songwriters: Jake Sinclair; Courtney Love

Courtney Love singles chronology
"You Know My Name" / "Wedding Day" (2014)	"Miss Narcissist" (2015)

"Miss Narcissist" is a song by American alternative rock musician Courtney Love. Written by Love and Jake Sinclair, it was released as a standalone single by the independent label Ghost Ramp.

It was initially released as a digital download on May 18, 2015, and then subsequently issued on 7" vinyl later the same year. The physical release features the track "Killer Radio" as a b-side.

== Release ==
The single debuted as a digital download on May 18, 2015, when Love was accompanying Lana Del Rey as an opening act on her Endless Summer Tour, and was performed live during these shows.

== Artwork ==
The album's cover art was hand-drawn by Love herself.

== Track listing ==
- Digital download
1. "Miss Narcissist" – 3:09
- 7" vinyl
1. "Miss Narcissist" – 3:09
2. "Killer Radio"

== Release history ==
Region	Date	Format	Label
Worldwide	May 18, 2015	Digital download	Crush Records
Worldwide	Summer 2015	7"	Ghost Ramp
