= Milkman (Phranc album) =

Studio album by Phranc
- Released: November 3, 1998
- Recorded: Los Angeles, California in 1998
- Genre: Folk, folk rock
- Length: 26:51
- Label: Phancy Records
- Producer: Warren Bruleigh, Phranc

Phranc chronology
Goofyfoot (1995)	Milkman (1998)

Professional ratings
Review scores
Source	Rating
AllMusic	3/5 stars
Los Angeles Times	3/4 stars

Milkman is an album by the folk singer-songwriter Phranc, released in 1998. It was her first album in seven years; she had spent several years putting on her Neil Diamond tribute act, Hot August Phranc.

The album was nominated for a GLAAD Media Award, in the "Outstanding Music - Album" category.

== Production ==
"Gary" is a song about Phranc's brother, who was murdered in 1991. "Ozzie and Harriet" tells of a one-on-one faltering relationship. "Tzena, Tzena" is sung in Yiddish.

The album title references Phranc's fondness for regularly wearing a milkman's uniform.

== Critical reception ==
The Los Angeles Times wrote that "with its minimalist, sincere folk-pop tunes, Phranc’s first album in seven years integrates the humor and pain in her recent life."

== Track listing ==
All tracks composed by Phranc; except where indicated

1. "Twirly" – 1:48
2. "The Handsome Cabin Boy" (Traditional) – 3:04
3. "Ozzie and Harriet" – 3:37
4. "Yer the One" – 1:42
5. "They Lied" – 2:26
6. "Where Were You?" – 4:28
7. "Gary" – 2:31
8. "Cuffs" – 3:48
9. "Lullaby" – 1:59
10. "Tzena, Tzena" (Traditional) – 1:28

== Personnel ==
- Phranc - Producer, vocals, arranger, guitar
- Warren Bruleigh - Producer
- Anna Waronker - Backing vocals
- Phil Parlapiano - Accordion
- Steve McDonald - Bass guitar
- Tal Bergman - Drums
- Jimmy Sloan - Engineer
- Jeff Skelton - Assistant engineer
- Bill Inglot - Mastering
- Dave Schultz - Mastering
- Howie Idelson - Design
- Rocky Schenck - Photography
