= Phranc =

American singer

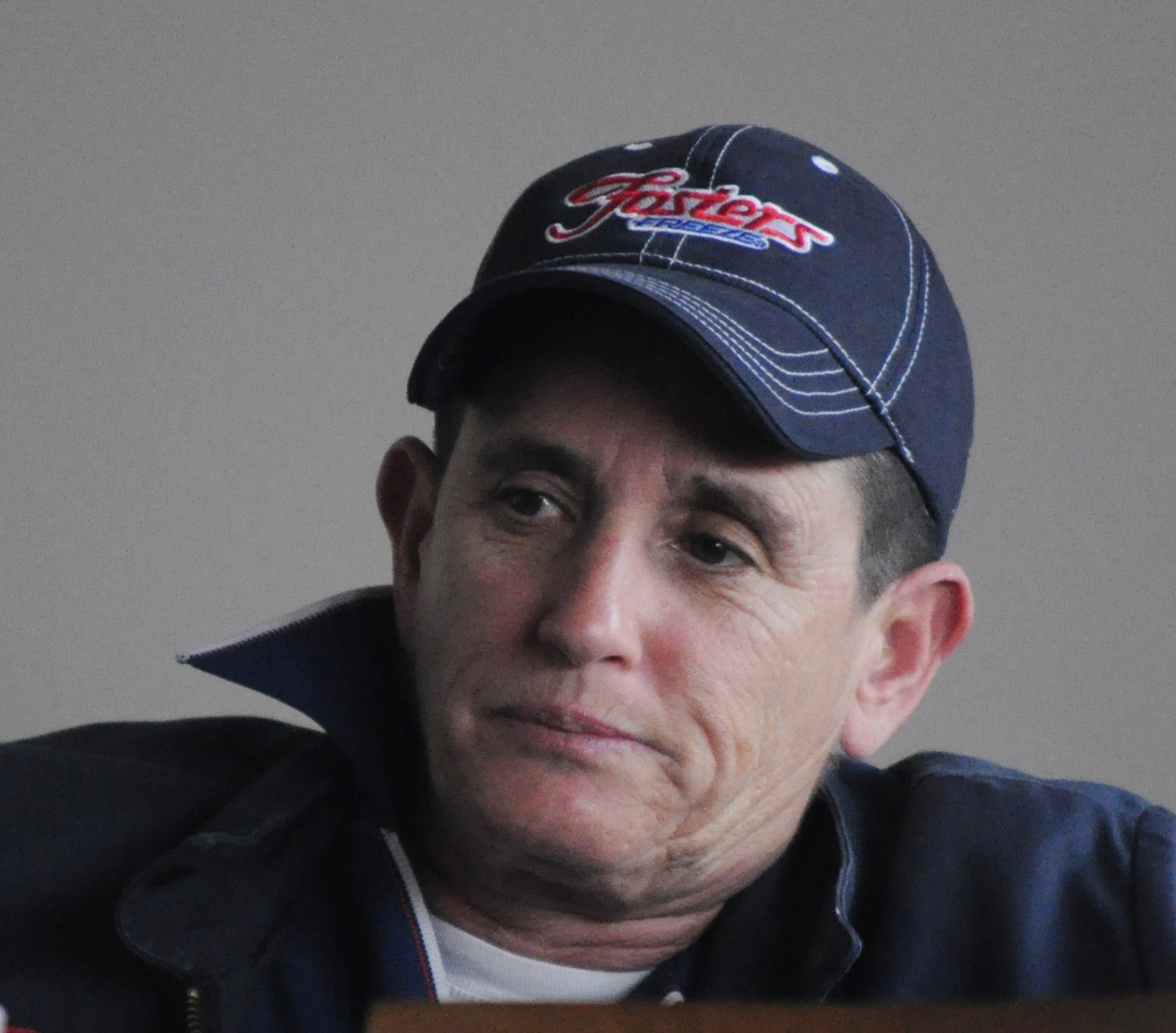
- Phranc at Work It!, a conference at USC on gender, race, and sexuality in pop music

Background information
- Born: Susan Gottlieb; August 28, 1957 (age 69); Santa Monica, California, U.S.
- Genres: Punk rock, folk
- Occupation: Singer-songwriter
- Instruments: Vocals, guitar
- Years active: 1970s–present
- Website: http://www.phranc.la/

Phranc (born Susan Gottlieb; August 28, 1957), is an American singer-songwriter whose career began playing in several bands in the late 1970s Los Angeles punk rock scene. Her musical style later shifted during the 1980s as a solo artist, into a self-proclaimed "All-American Jewish lesbian folksinger."

== Biography ==
Phranc was born Susan Gottlieb in Santa Monica, California, and grew up in Mar Vista, Los Angeles. She began her performing career in the late 1970s and early 1980s punk scene in Los Angeles. She had a bleached blonde crewcut and wore male attire, creating an androgynous persona for her first band, Nervous Gender, which formed in 1978. The writer V/D wrote of her for the punk fanzine Slash, "On stage, Phranc looks like a 14-year-old runaway from a boys' reform school." The band was influential in the development of what later came to be known as 'electropunk'. In 1980 she left Nervous Gender to join the punk band Catholic Discipline, in which Craig Lee (Bags) and Claude Bessy, journalist for Slash punk fanzine, were the lead singers. Phranc appears with Catholic Discipline in the 1980 documentary The Decline of Western Civilization. She was also in Castration Squad, a feminist, all-female punk band which also featured Dinah Cancer of 45 Grave, Elissa Bello of The Go-Go's, Alice Bag of the Bags, Tracy Lea of Redd Kross, and Shannon Wilhelm.

In the 1980s, Phranc pursued a solo career. She performs in Paul Morrissey's film Madame Wang's (1981) as Phranque. She began playing an acoustic guitar and released Folksinger on Rhino Records in 1985. She opened for music acts such as The Smiths, Hüsker Dü, Violent Femmes, and Billy Bragg. She styled herself the "All-American Jewish Lesbian Folksinger" and with a wry sense of humour released the LP I Enjoy Being a Girl in 1989 on Island Records, appearing on the cover with her trademark 'flat top' hair style. Describing a live performance, Adam Block wrote "Phranc's unnerving androgyny (expressed with easy confidence) and her fervent opinions (couched in sly, laconic wit) make her a fascinating performer." Her third full-length recording, released in 1991, was Positively Phranc.

Phranc was an important influence on the Queercore movement, being acknowledged as such by Team Dresch in their song for her, "Uncle Phranc." In the 1990s many queercore bands and musicians involved in queercore music began collaborating with her. She appeared as a guest on the Team Dresch LP/CD Captain My Captain and, as well, members of Team Dresch, Tobi Vail of Bikini Kill, Patty Schemel of Hole and others have played with Phranc on her EP Goofyfoot and other songs. Phranc performs and is interviewed in the queercore documentary She's Real, Worse Than Queer by Lucy Thane, and she has appeared frequently at queercore events such as Olympia's Homo-a-go-go festival. In the 1990s Phranc performed "Hot August Phranc", performing as Neil Diamond. On her full-length CD of 1998, Milkman, she is joined by Steve MacDonald of Redd Kross, who plays bass. Her most recent releases, including Milkman, appear on her own independent record label, Phancy Records.

The 2001 documentary film, Lifetime Guarantee, directed by Lisa Udelson, chronicled Phranc's side job as a Tupperware demonstrator and manager. The documentary showed that despite Phranc's stature, her work ethic, and engagement with the sales force, Tupperware did not recognize her contributions to the company. Phranc was still selling Tupperware in 2008, but as of 2013 her online store was closed.

She still performs occasionally, but spends more time working on creative visual art projects, including her Cardboard Cobbler sculptures. In December 2007 she had a solo art show at Cue Art Foundation in New York City curated by Ann Magnuson; The New York Times review compared her work to Claes Oldenburg and Andy Warhol. Phranc had her first major West Coast solo show, at Craig Krull Gallery, June 18 to July 23, 2011, an exhibition made of beach themed cardboard and craft paper works. She continues to work in her Santa Monica studio and is represented by Krull.

Phranc was absent from her blog and Facebook from late 2011 to Spring 2014. Phranc announced in April 2014 that she had been prevented from participating in online activities due to an injury.

In 2023 Phranc's retrospective The Butch Closet was held at Craig Krull Gallery in Santa Monica. It was a multi-disciplinary show that included new and old work as well as ephemera, home movies, merchandise and artfacts from her music and visual art career spanning over 40 years. It included pieces like drawings of food, vacuums, and toothpaste that Phranc did while working at the Women's Building in the 1970s, as well as current work like a reproduction of her Slash magazine t-shirt and her 1960s Lambchop Halloween costume.

== Personal life ==
Phranc lives in Santa Monica, California with her partner and children.

== Discography ==
=== Albums ===
- Folksinger (1985), Rhino
- I Enjoy Being a Girl LP (1989), Island
- Positively Phranc LP (1991), Island
- Goofyfoot 10" EP (1995), Kill Rock Stars
- Milkman LP (1998), Phancy

=== Singles ===
- "Amazon" (1985), Stiff
- "The Lonesome Death of Hattie Carroll" (1986), Stiff
- "Bulldagger Swagger" b/w "Hillary's Eyebrows" 7" single (1994), Kill Rock Stars

=== Compilations ===
- "My Favorite Women Newscasters" on The Best of the Radio Tokyo Tapes (Chameleon 8608, 1987)
- Some Songs (1997)
- Hang Ten Double CD on American Pop Project, Phranc with Satan's Pilgrims
- "Dumb Hairdresser" on Milkshake – A CD to Benefit the Harvey Milk Institute (1998), timmi-kat ReCoRDS
- "Tupperware Lady" on Kat Vox: A CD to Celebrate 20 Years of timmi-kat ReCoRDS (2011), timmi-kat ReCoRDS

== Exhibitions ==
=== Solo exhibitions ===
- 2023 The Butch Closet, Craig Krull Gallery, Santa Monica, CA
- 2018 Swagger, Craig Krull Gallery, Santa Monica, CA
- 2018 The Great Outdoors, Friesen Gallery, Ketchum, ID
- 2018 Toys, Craig Krull Gallery, Santa Monica, CA
- 2014 It Happened in Sun Valley, Friesen Gallery, Ketchum, ID,
- 2014 Winter, Craig Krull Gallery, Santa Monica, CA, 2013
- 2011 Phranc & Co. Out West General Store, Museum of the American West, Autry National Center, Los Angeles, CA
- 2011 Phranc of California, Craig Krull Gallery, Santa Monica, CA
- 2007 Phranc, CUE Art Foundation, New York City
- 2006 Cardboard Cupcake, 12 Birthday celebration, 18 Street Arts Center, Santa Monica, CA
- 2006 Phranc of California, Eastside Studios, Los Angeles, CA
- 2006 Paper Play, W/ Alison Bechdel, Pine Street Art Works – Burlington, VT
- 2005 Carnalville, cardboard sign installation w/ TEADA, 18th Street Arts Center, Santa Monica, CA
- 2004 The Cardboard Cobbler "Valentines" 18th Street Art Center, Santa Monica, CA
- 1994 Storefront Installation "Phranc-O-Mat", Creative Time, 42nd Street Arts Project, New York, NY
- 1992 Brief Encounter, Three dimensional pop art show, Highways, Santa Monica, CA

=== Group exhibitions ===
- 2014 Incognito 10, Santa Monica Museum of Art, Santa Monica, CA
- 2014 Filtered: What Does Love Look Like?, Friesen Gallery Fine Art, Ketchum, ID
- 2013 Compass-Navigating the Journey to Self-Identity, Orange County Center for Contemporary Art, Santa Ana, CA
- 2013 This Side of the 405, Ben Maltz Gallery, Otis College of Art and Design, Los Angeles, CA
- 2013 #three, The Archer School for Girls, Los Angeles, CA
- 2010 The Man I Wish I Was, A.I.R. Gallery, Brooklyn, NY
- 2009 Support, Frederieke Taylor Gallery, New York, NY
- 2008 This Side Up: The Art of Cardboard, San Jose Museum of Art, San Jose, CA
- 2008 Grandmasters, Honoring Sheila DeBretteville, The Art Directors Club, New York, NY
- 2008 Pink and Bent, Leslie/Lohman Gallery, New York, NY
- 2007 Welcome Home, Arena 1 Gallery, Santa Monica, CA
- 1999 Forming: The early days of PUNK, Track 16 Gallery, Santa Monica, CA
- 1994 Group Show, White Columns, New York
- 1978 Books, Posters, Postcards, w/Cindy Marsh, The Woman's Building, Los Angeles, CA
