= Samantha Maloney =

American musician (born 1975)

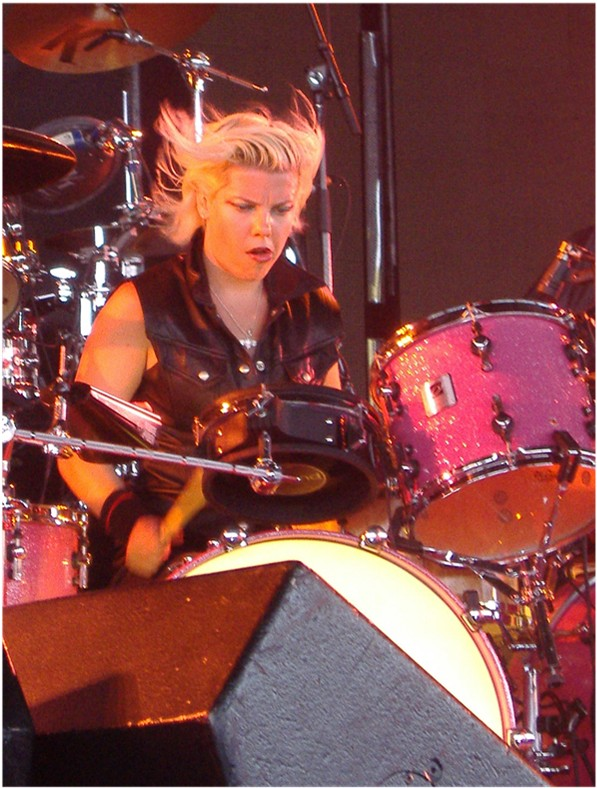
- Samantha Maloney on tour with Peaches in 2006.

Background information
- Born: December 11, 1975 (age 50); New York City, New York, U.S.
- Genres: Hard rock; electronic; alternative rock
- Occupations: Musician; songwriter; Survivor advocate
- Instrument: Drums
- Labels: Equal Vision; Columbia; Geffen; Beggars XL

Samantha Maloney (born December 11, 1975) is an American musician, survivor advocate and drummer. Maloney is the co-founder of Survivor Strategies, a survivor-centered law firm and CEO of the non-profit Sexual Predator Accountability Institute (SPAI). Maloney first gained recognition as the drummer in the alternative rock band, Hole and later toured internationally with artists including Motley Crüe, Eagles of Death Metal and Peaches.

== Early career ==
Maloney received her first drum-kit at the age of five. At the age of fourteen she enrolled at Fiorello H. LaGuardia High School of Music & Art and Performing Arts in New York City, and for the next three years studied percussion extensively. Maloney's formal training and immersion in New York’s music scene laid the groundwork for her later work across rock, metal, and alternative music.

== Music career ==
=== Shift (1993–1998) ===
When Maloney was in 11th grade, she joined the post-hardcore band, Shift, as a replacement drummer. She became its permanent drummer at age sixteen.

With Shift, she recorded the 1994 EP Pathos and the albums Spacesuit (1995) and Get In (1997), released on Equal Vision Records and Columbia Records, and toured in support of these releases.

=== Hole (1998–2000) ===
In 1998, Maloney audutioned in Los Angeles for the role of drummer in Hole, replacing Patty Schemel. After joining the band, Maloney toured extensively with Hole, at the height of their popularity, performing in arenas across the United States, Europe, Japan, and Australia, and appearing on television and in magazines, as well as Hole's recordings and videos.

=== Mötley Crüe (2000–2002) ===
When Hole went on hiatus in 2000, Maloney was invited to fill in for drummer Randy Castillo, (who was out of action due to a duodenal ulcer) on Mötley Crüe's New Tattoo tour. Maloney performed lived on tour with the band and appears on the bonus Live in Salt Lake City disc of New Tattoo and on the 2002 concert DVD, Mötley Crüe: Lewd, Crüed & Tattooed.

=== The Chelsea projects (2004-2009) ===
Maloney began working on solo material in the early aughts. In 2004, Maloney, formed The Chelsea with Melissa Auf der Maur, Paz Lenchantin, and Radio Sloan. They played a few gigs before disbanding.

Maloney later assembled Courtney Love’s live band, Love also calledThe Chelsea, for performances supporting Love’s 2004 solo album America’s Sweetheart, contributing to songwriting and drumming to the studio recordings and touring with the group.

In 2009, Maloney co‑founded Chelsea Girls, a cover band with Allison Robertson, Jill Janus, and Corey Parks, performing rock standards and featuring guest appearances by musicians such as Lemmy and Carmen Electra.

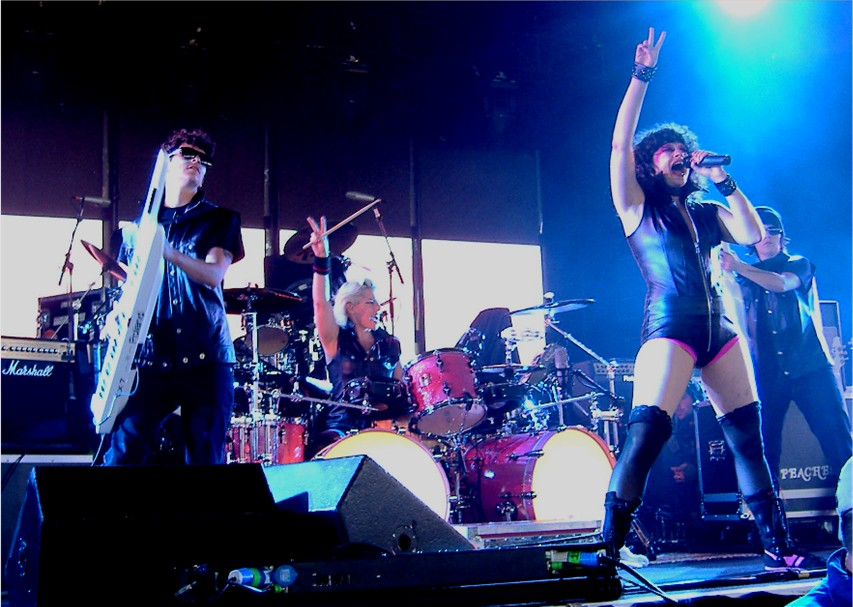
Maloney (second from left) performing with Peaches and the Herms in 2006.

=== Eagles of Death Metal & Peaches (2005-2007) ===
In 2005, Maloney was approached by Josh Homme to drum for his side-project Eagles of Death Metal. Maloney toured internationally with the band, opening for Queens of the Stone Age.

From 2006 to 2007, Maloney wrote, recorded and performed with Peaches in her live band the Herms, alongside JD Samson and Radio Sloan, in support of Peaches’ 2006 album Impeach My Bush.

=== Other musical work ===
In 2001, Maloney worked on The Desert Sessions Vol. 7 & 8 with Josh Homme, Mark Lanegan, and Chris Goss.

Maloney recorded and toured with Billy Ray Cyrus’s rock band Brother Clyde whose self‑titled album was released in 2010..

Maloney was manager for the Los Angeles-based teenage rock band Cherri Bomb, which eventually became Hey Violet. Maloney stepped down from the role in 2012.

== Filmography ==
In 2001, Maloney contributed music for Daryl Hannah's documentary about a stripper called Stripnotes.

In June 2003, Maloney and Scott Ian from Anthrax composed music for the Mr. Show movie Run Ronnie Run as "Titanica". During this time Maloney also added live drums to the score for the film Black Hawk Down.

In 2007, Maloney hosted, wrote, and produced the digital series, All Access on ManiaTV! for two seasons interviewing musicians such as Katy Perry, members of Crystal Method and Marily Manson, Sia, Gavin Rossdale and more. In 2008, Maloney guest starred as "Sam", Lew Ashby's chauffeur on three episodes of the Showtime series Californication.

She played the part of Maureen Tucker in the 2006 film Factory Girl, starring Sienna Miller as Edie Sedgwick.

In 2012, Maloney hosted the five-episode series on Vevo, You Play Like a Girl. The title was a play on the sexist insult, turning it into a badge of honor. Each episode featured Maloney mentoring a female musician. In 2013, Maloney was one of the judges on the reality series, Next Great Family Band.

In 2021, Maloney was featured in Mark Lo's documentary, Count Me In, about drummers, streaming on Netflix.

== Survivor advocacy ==
Maloney became VP of A&R at Warner Music Group in 2014 and laid off in 2017. She experienced and reported harassment and misconduct during her tenure at Warner Music Group. Maloney entered into a settlement and nondisclosure agreement in connection with those claims. She said in 2026, "I realized I had to leave the music industry in order to change it."

In 2024, Maloney co‑founded the legal and policy strategy firm Survivor Strategies with former California state senator Joe Dunn. Some of the work includes Maloney advocating for the release of documents linking Jeffrey Epstein to Ireland and Irish institutions. In the wake of Epstein‑file disclosures referencing LA28 chair Casey Wasserman, Maloney and Caroline Heldman, urged for greater scrutiny.

== Discography ==
=== With Shift ===
- Pathos EP (1994)
- Spacesuit (1995)
- Get In (1997)

=== With Mötley Crüe ===
- New Tattoo (2000) (Bonus “Live in Salt Lake City” disc)
- Lewd, Crüed & Tattooed (DVD) (2002)

=== With Courtney Love ===
- America's Sweetheart (2004)

=== With Peaches ===
- Impeach My Bush (2006)

=== With Brother Clyde ===
• Self Titled (2010)
