= America's Sweetheart (album) =

Studio album by Courtney Love
- Released: February 10, 2004
- Recorded: 2001–2003
- Studio: Studio Miraval; Le Val; Provence-Alpes-Côte d'Azur; France
- Genre: Alternative rock; hard rock; punk rock
- Length: 46:39
- Label: Virgin
- Producer: Josh Abraham; James Barber; Matt Serletic

Singles from America's Sweetheart
- 1. "Mono" Released: February 16, 2004; 2. "Hold On to Me" Released: March 29, 2004

America's Sweetheart is the debut studio album by American alternative rock musician Courtney Love, released worldwide on February 10, 2004 by Virgin Records. Her first official release after her former band Hole's break-up, the album's sound diverged significantly in musical and lyrical content to Hole's three previous studio albums: Pretty on the Inside (1991), Live Through This (1994) and Celebrity Skin (1998). The recording process of the album began in summer 2001 in Los Angeles, California, however, was affected drastically by a number of personal and legal issues by Love; including her drug problems, the disbandment of Hole, the controversy surrounding Nirvana's upcoming box set, and legal problems with various record labels. In spring 2003, Love traveled to southern France to re-record the album, however, according to Love, she "just wanted to be in a château for six months and do drugs." The album had three main producers, one of whom, James Barber, was Love's partner at the time.

Following recording, America's Sweetheart was further delayed due to Virgin's insistence on multiple changes to the songs and artwork. Upon its release, it received little promotion, with the main source of media exposure being a music video for the album's first single, "Mono," and Love's highly publicized drug issues. America's Sweetheart received mixed reviews and was a commercial failure, selling 86,000 copies in its first three months, and with Love further citing the album as "a mistake." In more recent years, both Love and producer Linda Perry have referred to the album as "le disaster" and "ruined because [Love] was coked out," respectively. The album featured drumming from former Hole drummer Patty Schemel, as well as guest instrumentation and vocals from Emilie Autumn.

== Background and history ==
Though the original recordings for America's Sweetheart were made at a château in the south of France in 2003, the concept of Love's first solo album was conceived as early as 2001, when rough versions of songs later to appear on America's Sweetheart were being recorded. Critics who had heard the recordings referred to the tracks as "her best recordings yet." Also around this time, Love began doing live performances, notably at both Ventura's Majestic Theater and the Hollywood Bowl in October 2001, at which early versions of songs (such as "But Julian, I'm A Little Bit Older Than You" and "All the Drugs") were performed.

The recording sessions for the album featured Love working with producer Linda Perry and lyricist Bernie Taupin, and amounted to a total of 32 songs, including a cover of "Bette Davis Eyes" by Kim Carnes.

Non-US versions of the album feature – though uncredited – Brody Dalle and Kim Deal on a different recording of "Sunset Strip" (with slightly altered lyrics), singing and playing guitar. Dalle claims she is also a co-writer of the song. Despite being initially offended by the lack of credit, Dalle was happy to be uncredited due to the album's subsequent mixed reception.

=== Record deal and controversy ===
In 2001, during rough recordings of the album, Love was rumoured to have been offered a deal by Interscope Records and the Universal Music Group that amounted to $18 million. However, recordings from the 2003 sessions were distributed to four different record labels after their completion. Although it seemed likely that Love was to sign with UK label Poptones, instead she signed to Virgin Records, who offered her a $20 million record deal. However, upon purchasing the album, Virgin demanded that the album be re-recorded so it would make their fiscal-year deadline of March 31. Love, who was in rehab for drug addiction at the time, was brought back and forth from her health center by Virgin Records and subsequently, her recovery from addiction did not improve and she became overwhelmed by compulsory work. Aside from it all, Love later revealed to Rolling Stone that she "never saw a penny" from the advance that Virgin Records supposedly paid her for America's Sweetheart.

Also, amidst the several controversies surrounding America's Sweetheart's release, Love accused Virgin Records of putting the final product out before it was finished. According to her, the record company chose the songs, the cover, the recorded vocals and the final arrangements without her participation: "...I made five good songs. I had twelve songs, but they're not on the album. I had no creative control." Furthermore, according to BMI and ASCAP's websites, four of the songs on the album ("But Julian I'm a Little Bit Older Than You", "Almost Golden" and both singles, "Mono" and "Hold on to Me") weren't officially registered for copyright collect. By late 2006, the legal status of all of them seemed to have been corrected.

== Music and composition ==
Love, on various occasions, has stated her disappointment with the album. She demonstrated her extreme regret about the record in a September 2006 interview:

"The sound on America's Sweetheart sucked beyond words. The production was a nightmare. Linda and I had written some really good songs, but they were rendered lazily and sound like shit. The art was horrific and not my idea and the label didn't back it at all. I was busy taking drugs to dull the pain of having lost everything and made a shit album to boot [...] the producer didn't know what he was doing and he just spent my money. It almost had a moment of being Exile on Main Street – almost – but that's like almost winning a race. You either do or you do not. And in this case it's a delightfully written record in parts and sonically untenable with two of the most pretentious songs I have ever written. I was so druggy I thought it'd be cute to rip off "(Smells Like) Teen Spirit" on "I'll Do Anything." Believe it or not, "All the Drugs", "Sunset Strip", "Mono" and "But Julian..." are all good songs. They just were produced crap and the songs weren't taken further than demo status. The art still makes me seethe. At least make it look cool, and instead there's me as a Playboy pinup. I love Olivia's art but that was personal for me – not art for a record."

In the documentary The Return of Courtney Love, co-writer Linda Perry referred to America's Sweetheart by saying "a lot of heart went in to and it got ruined because her [Courtney] and her friend were coke'd out." In 2010, while addressing the Oxford Union, Love referred to the album as a "really crap record" and reasoned that drug issues were to blame for its content.

In 2004, before the final production and release of the album, Love asked ex-Hole drummer Samantha Maloney to travel to France after drummer Patty Schemel left the album's recording sessions for a second time. After adding drum takes to the album, Maloney travelled back to the US and was put in charge of assembling Love's live band, which later became known as The Chelsea. After auditions, Maloney reconnected with guitarist Radio Sloan, found guitarist Lisa Leveridge, bassist Dvin Kirakosian, and the four women formed the core of Love's backing band. Violinist Emilie Autumn later joined the band.

== Commercial performance ==
America's Sweetheart is usually regarded as a commercial failure. In the US, the album debuted at number fifty-three on the Billboard 200, selling 33,000 copies. This figure was significantly lower than Love's last album, Hole's Celebrity Skin, which debuted at number nine. In its first three months, the album sold 86,000 copies, which was equivalent to Celebrity Skin's first week sales.

The first single taken from the album, "Mono", was released in February 2004 and the song experienced some radio airplay, peaking at number 18 in the Billboard charts and number 41 in the UK. The album's second single, "Hold on to Me", peaked at number 39 on the billboard Modern Rock Tracks, and was a minor hit in several countries.

== Reception ==
Professional ratings
Aggregate scores
Source	Rating
Metacritic	59/100
Review scores
Source	Rating
AllMusic	2.5/5 stars
The A.V. Club	D
Entertainment Weekly	A−
The Guardian	3/5 stars
NME	6/10
Pitchfork	4.0/10
Rolling Stone	2/5 stars
Spin	A−
USA Today	2.5/4 stars
The Village Voice	A−

Critical response to America's Sweetheart was mixed. Stephen Thomas Erlewine of AllMusic stated that "since her solo debut is so sloppy and predictable [...] it suggests her music is more bluster than meaning" and that "[Love is] trying to snarl like it's 1994, yet wrapping herself in a glossy production from 1998 while relying on songs that are an amalgam of bad L.A. punk and bad L.A. metal." NME also published a mixed review stating that the album "sounds slight and rather ragged" but "never less than compelling" and that "the production covers everything in a superficial glosshile." Pitchfork Media reacted negatively to the album, stating that "America's Sweetheart demonstrates a fairly monstrous decline in both quality and conviction" and that it was "retaining all the dated grunge crunch." Similarly, Rolling Stone magazine's Rob Sheffield suggested that, "for people who enjoy watching celebrities fall apart, America's Sweetheart should be more fun than an Osbournes marathon." In The Village Voice, Robert Christgau wrote positively of the record, believing Love had "delivered an album as invigorating in its contempt for rock professionalism as Neil Young's Tonight's the Night." Spin critic Charles Aaron was also impressed by the album, referring to it as a "jaw-dropping act of artistic will", while Caroline Sullivan from The Guardian noted the lyrics as the strong point of the album calling them "hedonistic to the last" and "some of the baldest ever recorded."

== Track listing ==
No.	Title	Writer(s)	Producer(s)	Length
1.	"Mono"	Courtney Love; Linda Perry; Patty Schemel; Larry Schemel	Josh Abraham	3:39
2.	"But Julian, I'm a Little Bit Older Than You"	Love; P. Schemel; L. Schemel	Abraham	2:48
3.	"Hold On to Me"	Love	Matt Serletic	3:45
4.	"Sunset Strip"	Love; Perry; P. Schemel; Jerry Best	Abraham	5:32
5.	"All the Drugs"	Love; P. Schemel; Best; Chris Whitemyer	James Barber	4:31
6.	"Almost Golden"	Love; Barber	Barber	3:25
7.	"I'll Do Anything"	Love; Perry; P. Schemel; Best	Abraham	3:01
8.	"Uncool"	Love; Perry; P. Schemel; Best; Bernie Taupin	Serletic	4:37
9.	"Life Despite God"	Love; Perry; P. Schemel; Best	Barber	4:16
10.	"Hello"	Love; Perry; P. Schemel; Best	Abraham	3:10
11.	"Zeplin Song"	Love; Perry	Barber	2:48
12.	"Never Gonna Be the Same"	Love; Perry; P. Schemel; Best	Barber	5:07
Total length:				46:39

Japanese edition bonus track
No.	Title	Writer(s)	Length
13.	"Fly"	Love; Perry; P. Schemel; Best	2:43
Total length:			49:22

== Personnel ==
- Courtney Love – vocals, guitars, drawings, additional production
- Scott McCloud – guitars
- Lisa Leveridge – additional guitars
- Brody Dalle – additional guitars (uncredited)
- Jerry Best – bass guitar
- Patty Schemel – drums
- Samantha Maloney – additional drums
- Emilie Autumn – violin
- Chris Whitemyer – additional instruments
- Joe Gore – additional instruments
- Josh Abraham – producer
- James Barber – producer
- Matt Serletic – producer
- Jamie Candiloro – engineer
- Greg Collins – engineer
- Ryan Williams – engineer
- Joe Zook – engineer, mixing
- Chris Lord-Alge – mixing
- David Thoener – mixing
- Andy Wallace – mixing
- Olivia De Berardinis – artwork
- David LaChapelle – photography

== Charts ==
Chart performance
Chart (2004)	Peak position
Australian Albums (ARIA)	40
Austrian Albums (Ö3 Austria)	62
Canadian Albums (Nielsen SoundScan)	49
Dutch Alternative Albums (Alternative Top 30)	30
French Albums (SNEP)	85
German Albums (Offizielle Top 100)	49
Italian Albums (FIMI)	60
Japanese Albums (Oricon)	24
New Zealand Albums (RMNZ)	26
Scottish Albums (OCC)	55
Swedish Albums (Sverigetopplistan)	13
UK Albums (OCC)	56
US Billboard 200	53
