= Mono (Courtney Love song) =

Song by Courtney Love

Single by Courtney Love

from the album America's Sweetheart
- B-side: "Fly"
- Released: February 16, 2004
- Recorded: 2003
- Studio: Studio Miraval (Le Val)
- Genre: Alternative rock; punk rock
- Length: 3:39
- Label: Virgin
- Songwriters: Courtney Love; Linda Perry; Patty Schemel; Larry Schemel
- Producer: Josh Abraham

Courtney Love singles chronology
"Mono" (2004)	"Hold on to Me" (2004)

Music video
- "Mono" on YouTube

"Mono" is the debut single released by Courtney Love, as a solo artist. Released the week after its parent album, America's Sweetheart, the single was overshadowed by issues Love was undergoing in her personal life – namely her drug addiction and legal problems – and was a subsequent commercial failure. A promotional music video for the song was also created.

== Background and production ==
"Mono" was one of the first songs recorded during the sessions for America's Sweetheart, and was written by Love, Linda Perry, former Hole bandmate, Patty Schemel and her brother, Larry Schemel. The song was recorded at Studio Miraval, a chateau in the south of France, in 2003.

The alternate version of "Mono" – featured on the maxi single release – contains a sample of dialogue from the 1963 movie Cleopatra as spoken by actors Elizabeth Taylor and Richard Burton.

== Music video ==
Directed by Chris Milk, the promotional music video for "Mono" received major airplay on British music channels such as The Box, The Hits, TMF and Chart Show TV during Summer 2004. The music video featured a "sleeping beauty" theme.

== Track listings and formats ==
- CAN / EU CD Single / EU 7" Vinyl
1. "Mono" – 3:39
2. "Fly" – 2:56
- EU Maxi / UK CD Single
1. "Mono" – 3:39
2. "Fly" – 2:56
3. "Mono" (Alternate Version) – 3:41
4. "Mono" (Video) – 3:39

== Charts and sales ==
Chart (2004)	Peak position
UK Singles (OCC)	41
US Alternative Airplay (Billboard)	18

Region	Certification	Certified units/sales
United Kingdom	—	70,000
United States	—	30,000
