= Kinderwhore =

American 1990s clothing style

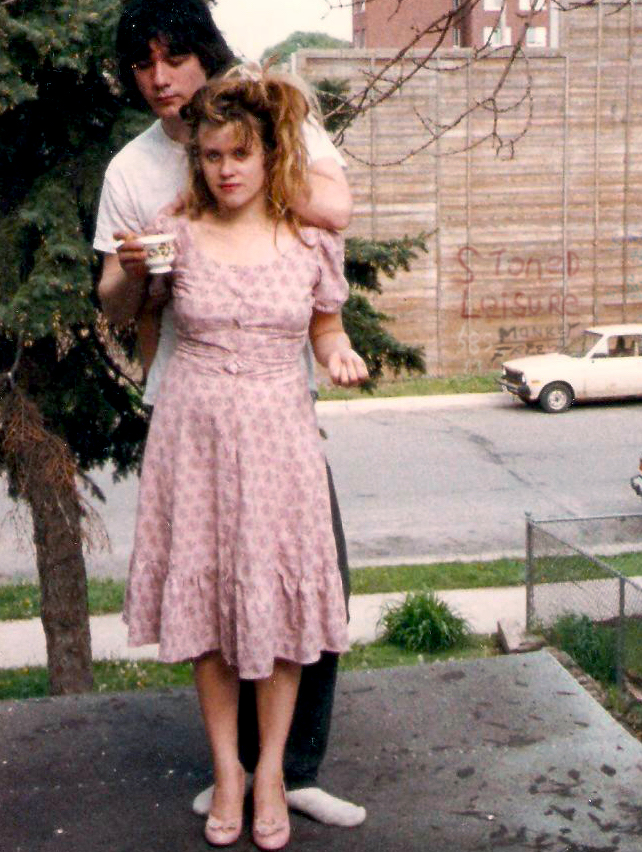
Kat Bjelland wearing a kinderwhore outfit in 1992

Kinderwhore is a fashion style most notably worn by some female grunge and alternative rock musicians in the US during the early to mid-1990s. The style is characterized through the combination of cute, feminine fashion items like babydoll and Peter Pan collared dresses, with more adult aspects like smudged red lipstick and dark eye makeup. It has its origins in the mid-1980s band Pagan Babies, which featured future Babes in Toyland vocalist/guitarist Kat Bjelland and future Hole vocalist/guitarist Courtney Love, who lived together and shared clothes. Following the band's disbandment, the two's subsequent bands achieved significant mainstream success and led to the fashion being popularised amongst the general public and being referenced by high fashion designers including Marc Jacobs.

== Fashion ==
Kinderwhore fashion is based around a childlike fashion silhouette and accessories in combination with punk fashion's "rips and tears". Common items include torn, ripped tight or low-cut babydoll and Peter-Pan-collared dresses, knee-socks, heavy makeup with dark eyeliner, slip dresses, ripped tights, bleached hair, smudged red lipstick, lingerie, cardigans, barrettes, and leather boots or Mary Jane shoes.

Mish Way described it as "intentionally taking the most constraining parts of the feminine, good-girl aesthetic, inflating them to a cartoon level, and subverting them to kill any ingrained insecurities." She further noted that although the look was very feminine, when its exponents performed onstage they "stood tall and confident, they threw their guitars around like weapons, and screamed out whip-smart feminist lyrics. These women were questioning the cultural importance of typical beauty through costume and the stage." Fashion academic Morna Laing likened the style to a same-sex form of drag by "exaggerating the contradictory demands of ideal femininity; betraying its constructed-ness; subverting it from within".

Interviewed in 1994, Love commented:

I would like to think—in my heart of hearts—that I'm changing some psychosexual aspects of rock music. Not that I'm so desirable. I didn't do the kinder-whore thing because I thought I was so hot. When I see the look used to make one more appealing, it pisses me off. When I started, it was a What Ever Happened to Baby Jane? thing. My angle was irony.

== History ==
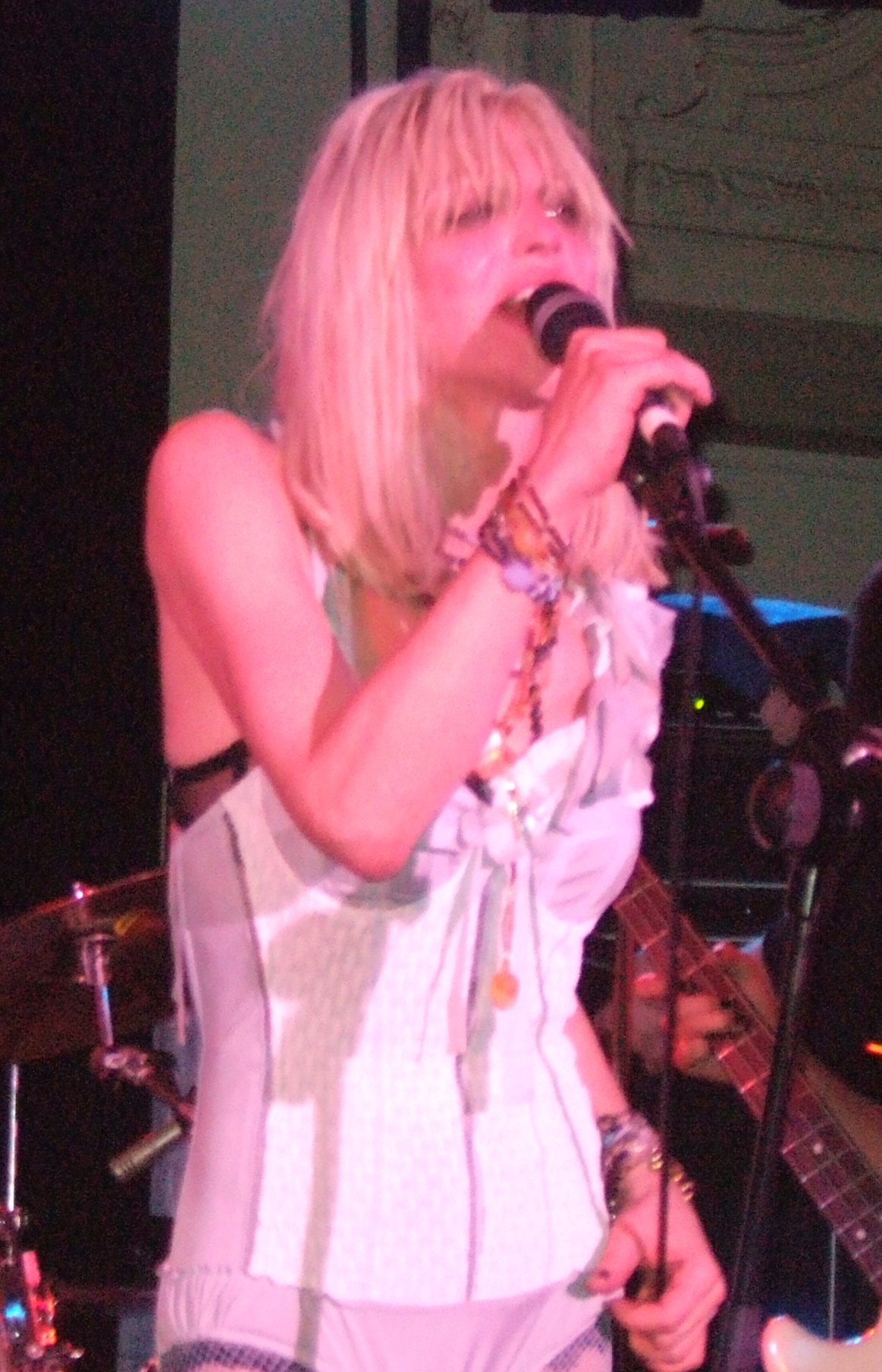
Courtney Love helped to popularize the fashion style

In the mid–1980s, musicians Kat Bjelland and Courtney Love shared an apartment together while playing in the band Pagan Babies. During this time, the pair would often borrow one another's clothes. Both are generally credited by publications including i-D, the Guardian and Rolling Stone as inventing the kinderwhore fashion style, however both dispute the other's involvement. In interviews, Love credited the inspiration for the style as coming from KatieJane Garside of Daisy Chainsaw and Christine Amphlett of Divinyls. Furthermore, during this period, many of the style's prominent characteristics such as vintage clothing, velvet and 1970s polyester were cheap and easily accessible. i-D observed that the name "kinderwhore" was coined by Melody Maker journalist Everett True, whereas the Guardian credited the term to Bjelland.

Following the 1987 disbandment of Pagan Babies, Bjelland formed Babes in Toyland and Love formed Hole, and both continued to sport this look. In the 1990s, these groups received significant mainstream success. As early as 1992, the style was beginning to slip into mainstream and high fashion, with Perry Ellis' 1992 Grunge collection, by Marc Jacobs embracing elements of kinderwhore. The Guardian specifically cited the 1994 music video for Hole's song "Miss World" as when "The look went viral." Soon, major fashion magazines like Seventeen and Sassy featured editorials on how to achieve the look.

=== Legacy ===
With the rise of the soft grunge fashion trend in the 2010s, kinderwhore received a revived interest. Meadham Kirchhoff's spring/summer 2012 collection was inspired by the style, with its runway show being opened by introducing a group of women dressed as Courtney Love during Hole 1996 Reading Festival performance, with Jeremy Scott's fall/winter 2014 collection and Yves Saint Laurent's Resort 2016 collections also embracing this influence. Furthermore, brand including Urban Outfitters, Forever 21 and Free People began putting an emphasis on many of the items that defined kinderwhore fashion, as did Kanye West and Kim Kardashian's childrenswear collection the Kids Supply. In 2019, designer Batsheva Hay cited Courtney Love's "kinderwhore aesthetic" as inspiration. Hay said Love's look "was so of that time but she was also so ahead of her time".

The style received a minor revival in the early 2020s through videos posted on the video sharing application TikTok and mainstream musicians including Olivia Rodrigo taking influence from its aesthetics for her debut album Sour (2021). The 2020 novel Dead Rock Stars by the English author Guy Mankowski depicts a fictional Kinderwhore band called Cherub, whose lead singer Emma draws from the Kinderwhore aesthetic of "Hollywood glamour of tiaras and satin dresses... with a twisted, girlish sensibility." Mankowski added, "I was influenced by the urge that such artists had to use their body to offer a message, with them making the very most of the textual space that comes with being in a band."

== See also ==
- Grunge fashion
- Heroin chic
- Soft grunge
- Lolita fashion
