= Courtney Love =

American rock musician (born 1964)

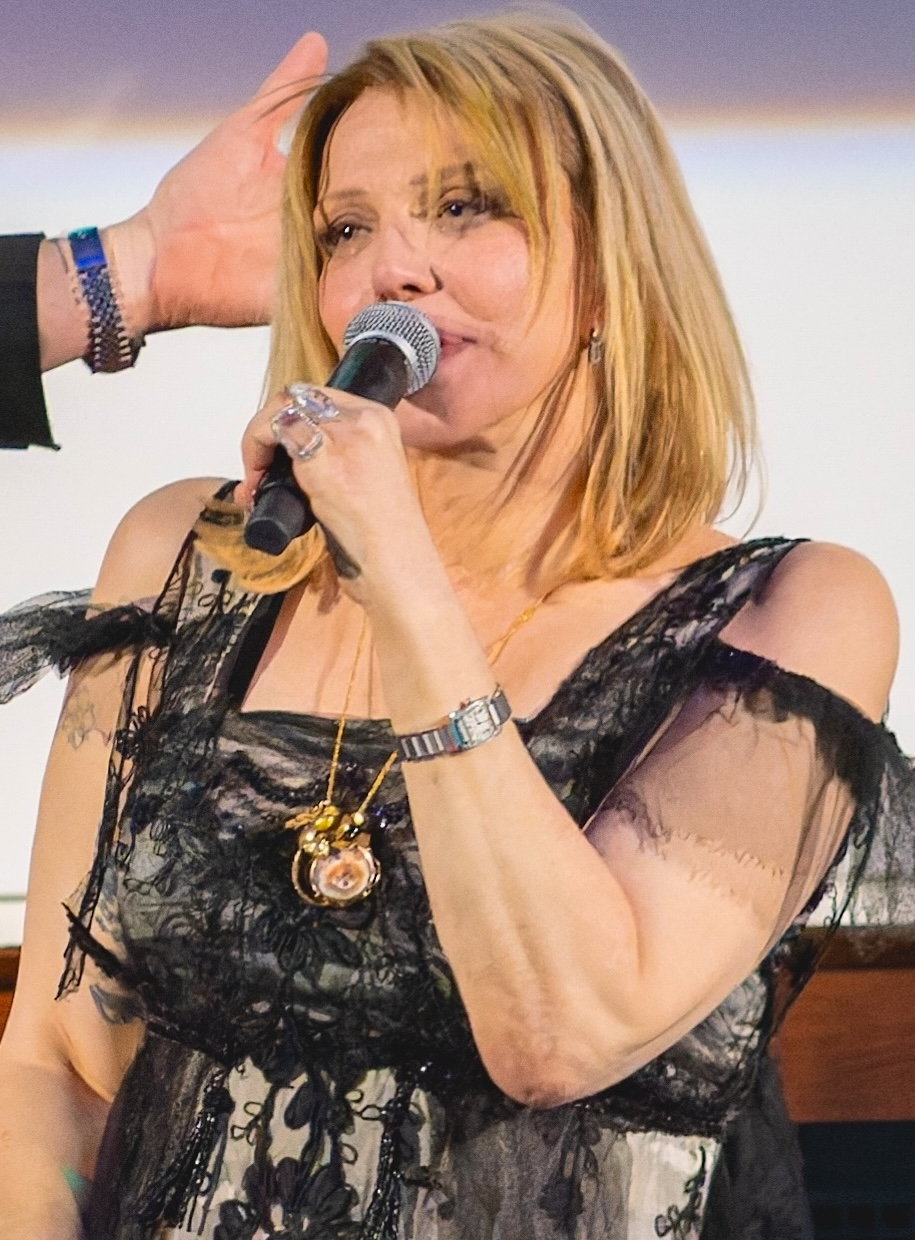
- Love in 2025
- Born: Courtney Michelle Harrison; July 9, 1964 (age 62); San Francisco, California, U.S.
- Other names: Courtney Rodriguez; Courtney Menely; Courtney Love Cobain
- Occupations: Singer; musician; songwriter; actress
- Years active: 1981–present
- Notable work: Discography; filmography
- Spouses: James Moreland (m. 1989; ann. 1989); Kurt Cobain (m. 1992; died 1994)
- Children: Frances Bean Cobain
- Mother: Linda Carroll
- Relatives: Paula Fox (grandmother); Paul Hervey Fox (great-grandfather)
- Awards: Full list
- Musical career
- Origin: Portland, Oregon, U.S.
- Genres: Alternative rock; punk rock; noise rock; grunge; power pop
- Instruments: Vocals; guitar
- Labels: Sympathy for the Record Industry; Caroline; DGC; Virgin; Ghost Ramp
- Formerly of: Hole; Sugar Babydoll; Pagan Babies; Faith No More

Courtney Michelle Love (née Harrison; born July 9, 1964) is an American singer, guitarist, songwriter, and actress. A prominent figure in the alternative and grunge scenes of the 1990s, Love has had a career spanning four decades. She rose to prominence as the lead vocalist and rhythm guitarist of the alternative rock band Hole, which she formed in 1989. Love has drawn public attention for her uninhibited live performances and confrontational lyrics, as well as her highly publicized personal life following her marriage to the Nirvana frontman Kurt Cobain.

Love had an itinerant childhood, but was primarily raised in Portland, Oregon, where she played in a series of short-lived bands and was active in the local punk scene. After briefly being in a juvenile hall, she spent a year living in Dublin and Liverpool before returning to the United States and pursuing an acting career. She appeared in supporting roles in the Alex Cox films Sid and Nancy (1986) and Straight to Hell (1987) before forming the band Hole in Los Angeles with guitarist Eric Erlandson. The group received critical acclaim from underground rock press for their 1991 debut album Pretty on the Inside, produced by Kim Gordon, while their second release, Live Through This (1994), was met with critical accolades and multi-platinum sales. In 1995, Love returned to acting, earning a Golden Globe Award nomination for her performance as Althea Leasure in Miloš Forman's The People vs. Larry Flynt (1996), which established her as a mainstream actress. The following year, Hole's third album, Celebrity Skin (1998), was nominated for three Grammy Awards.

Love continued to work as an actress into the early 2000s, appearing in big-budget pictures such as Man on the Moon (1999) and Trapped (2002), before releasing her first solo album, America's Sweetheart, in 2004. The subsequent several years were marred with publicity surrounding Love's legal troubles and drug relapse, which resulted in a mandatory lockdown rehabilitation sentence in 2005 while she was writing a second solo album. That project became Nobody's Daughter, released in 2010 as a Hole album but without the former Hole lineup. Between 2014 and 2015, Love released two solo singles and returned to acting in the network series Sons of Anarchy and Empire.

== Life and career ==
=== 1964–1982: Childhood and education ===
Courtney Michelle Harrison was born July 9, 1964, at Saint Francis Memorial Hospital in San Francisco, the first child of psychotherapist Linda Carroll (née Risi) (Note: Love's mother, Linda Carroll, though the biological daughter of Paula Fox, was adopted at birth by Jack and Louella Risi, an Italian-American family from San Francisco.) and Hank Harrison, a publisher and road manager for the Grateful Dead. Her parents met at a party held for Dizzy Gillespie in 1963, and the two married in Reno, Nevada, after Carroll discovered she was pregnant. Carroll, who was adopted at birth, is the biological daughter of novelist Paula Fox. The identity of Love's maternal biological grandfather is unknown. Her matrilineal great-grandparents were screenwriters Elsie Fox (née de Sola de Carvajal), a Cuban immigrant, and Paul Hervey Fox. Phil Lesh, the founding bassist of the Grateful Dead, was Love's godfather. According to Love, she was named after Courtney Farrell, the protagonist of Pamela Moore's 1956 novel Chocolates for Breakfast. Love is of mixed Cuban, English, Welsh, Irish, Ashkenazi Jewish, and German ancestry. She was baptized a Roman Catholic. Through her mother's subsequent marriages, she has two younger half-sisters, three younger half-brothers (one of whom died in infancy), and one adopted brother.

In 1970, Love's parents divorced after her mother and one of her father's girlfriends testified that Hank dosed her with LSD when she was a toddler. Carroll also alleged that Hank threatened to abduct his daughter and flee with her to a foreign country. Though Hank denied these allegations, his custody was revoked. Carroll relocated with Love to Oregon, residing in Marcola while completing a psychology degree at the University of Oregon. There, Carroll married schoolteacher Frank Rodríguez, who legally adopted Love. Love attended a Montessori school in Eugene, where she struggled academically and socially. She has said that she began seeing psychiatrists at "like, [age] three. Observational therapy. TM for tots. You name it, I've been there." At age nine, a psychologist noted that she exhibited signs of autism, among them tactile defensiveness and nonverbal behavior.

In 1972, Love's mother divorced Rodríguez, remarried to sportswriter David Menely, and moved the family to Nelson, New Zealand. Love was enrolled at Nelson College for Girls, but soon expelled for misbehavior. In 1973, Carroll sent Love back to Portland, Oregon, where she was raised by her former stepfather and other family friends. At age 14, Love was arrested for shoplifting from a Woolworth store at Lloyd Center and remanded at Hillcrest Correctional Facility, a juvenile hall in Salem, Oregon. While at Hillcrest, she became acquainted with records by Patti Smith, the Runaways, and the Pretenders. She was intermittently placed in foster care throughout late 1979 until becoming legally emancipated in 1980, after which she remained staunchly estranged from her mother.

After her emancipation, Love spent two months in Japan working as a topless dancer, but was deported after her passport was confiscated. She returned to Portland, working as a DJ at a gay disco and a dancer at Mary's Club, adopting the surname Love to conceal her identity; she later adopted Love as her surname. Love said she lacked social skills as a teenager, and learned them while frequenting gay clubs and spending time with drag queens. During this period, she briefly enrolled at Portland State University, studying English and philosophy. She later commented that, had she not found a passion for music, she would have sought a career working with children.

Before Liverpool, my life doesn't count. Ian McCulloch and Julian Cope taught me a great deal. I owe them a lot. Liverpool had been a great school to become a rock star.

— Love on her time in Liverpool

In 1981, Love was granted a small trust fund that had been left by her maternal grandparents. She used that money to travel to Dublin, Ireland, where her biological father was living, and audited theology courses at Trinity College. She later received honorary patronage from Trinity's University Philosophical Society in 2010. While in Dublin, Love met musician Julian Cope of the Teardrop Explodes at one of the band's concerts. Cope took a liking to Love and eventually allowed her and a friend to stay at his Liverpool home in his absence. Cope's roommate, musician Pete de Freitas, was initially hesitant to allow the girls to stay, but acquiesced as they were "alarmingly young and obviously had nowhere else to go". Cope writes of Love frequently in his 1994 autobiography, Head-On, in which he refers to her as "the adolescent".

In July 1982, Love returned to the United States. In late 1982, she attended a Faith No More concert in San Francisco and convinced the members to let her join as a singer. The group recorded material with Love as a vocalist, but fired her; according to keyboardist Roddy Bottum, who remained Love's friend in the years after, the band wanted a "male energy".

Love returned to working abroad as an erotic dancer, briefly in Taiwan, and then at a taxi dance hall in Hong Kong. By Love's account, she first used heroin while working at the Hong Kong dance hall, having mistaken it for cocaine. While still intoxicated, Love was pursued by a wealthy male client who requested that she return with him to the Philippines, and gave her money to purchase new clothes. She used the money to purchase an airfare back to the United States.

=== 1983–1987: Early music projects and film ===
At age 19, through her then-boyfriend's mother, film costume designer Bernadene Mann, Love took a job at Paramount Studios cleaning out the wardrobe department of vintage pieces that had suffered dry rot or other damage. During this time, Love became interested in vintage fashion. She subsequently returned to Portland, where she formed short-lived musical projects with her friends Ursula Wehr and Robin Barbur (namely Sugar Babylon, later known as Sugar Babydoll). (Note: There are several different versions in circulation of how Sugar Babydoll (and later, Pagan Babies) formed. The version told in the E! True Hollywood Story as told by Kat Bjelland fails to mention the alternate names of the group, though Love's 1998 biography by Poppy Z. Brite notes the shift in name from Sugar Babylon to Sugar Babydoll.) Love briefly fronted Faith No More for their first TV appearance in 1984: she sang with a Siouxsie Sioux-style vocal. After meeting Kat Bjelland at the Satyricon nightclub in 1984, the two formed the group the Pagan Babies. Love asked Bjelland to start the band with her as a guitarist, and the two moved to San Francisco in June 1985, where they recruited bassist Jennifer Finch and drummer Janis Tanaka. According to Bjelland, "[Courtney] didn't play an instrument at the time" aside from keyboards, so Bjelland would transcribe Love's musical ideas on guitar for her. The group played several house shows and recorded one 4-track demo before disbanding in late 1985. After Pagan Babies, Love moved to Minneapolis, where Bjelland had formed the group Babes in Toyland, and briefly worked as a concert promoter before returning to California.

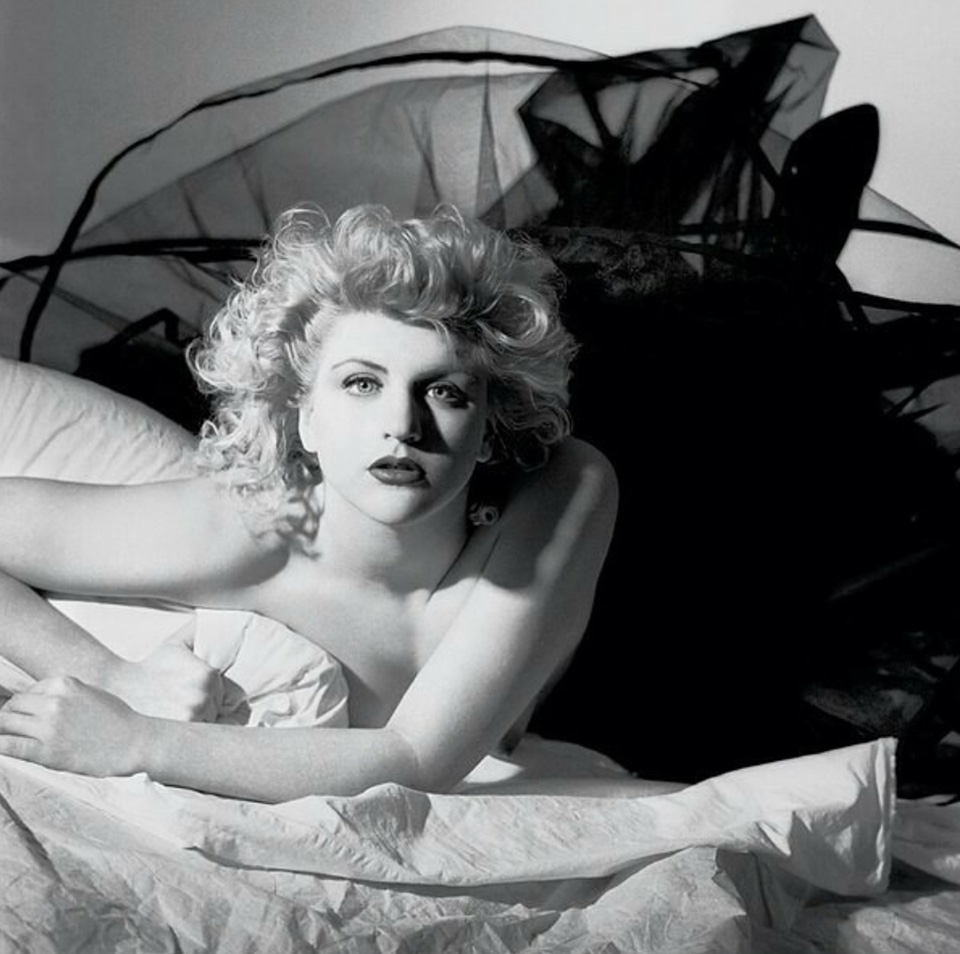
Love in a publicity headshot for Straight to Hell, 1986

Deciding to shift her focus to acting, Love enrolled at the San Francisco Art Institute and studied film under experimental director George Kuchar, featuring in one of his short films, Club Vatican. She also took experimental theater courses in Oakland taught by Whoopi Goldberg. Love has stated that she underwent a rhinoplasty at age 20, and that she felt the procedure helped advance her career.

In 1985, she submitted an audition tape for the role of Nancy Spungen in the Sid Vicious biopic Sid and Nancy (1986) and was given a minor supporting role by director Alex Cox. After filming Sid and Nancy in New York City, she worked at a peep show in Times Square and squatted at the ABC No Rio social center and Pyramid Club in the East Village. That year, Cox cast her in a leading role in his film Straight to Hell (1987), a Spaghetti Western starring Joe Strummer, Dennis Hopper, and Grace Jones, shot in Spain in 1986. The film was poorly reviewed by critics, but it caught the attention of Andy Warhol, who featured Love in an episode of Andy Warhol's Fifteen Minutes. She also had a part in the 1988 Ramones music video for "I Wanna Be Sedated", appearing as a bride among dozens of party guests.

Displeased by the "celebutante" fame she had attained, Love abandoned her acting career in 1988 and resumed work as a stripper in Oregon, where she was recognized by customers at a bar in the small town of McMinnville. This prompted Love to go into isolation and relocate to Anchorage, Alaska, where she lived for three months to "gather her thoughts", supporting herself by working at a strip club frequented by local fishermen. "I decided to move to Alaska because I needed to get my shit together and learn how to work", she said in retrospect. "So I went on this sort of vision quest. I got rid of all my earthly possessions. I had my bad little strip clothes and some big sweaters, and I moved into a trailer with a bunch of other strippers."

=== 1988–1991: Beginnings of Hole ===
She was the most gung-ho person I've ever met ... She gave 180%. I've worked with some people that you've had to coax the performance out of them. With Courtney, there was no attitude.

— Don Fleming, who co-produced Hole's debut album with Kim Gordon, on Love

In late 1988, Love taught herself to play guitar and relocated to Los Angeles, where she placed an ad in a local music zine: "I want to start a band. My influences are Big Black, Sonic Youth, and Fleetwood Mac." By 1989, Love had recruited guitarist Eric Erlandson; bassist Lisa Roberts, her neighbor; and drummer Caroline Rue, whom she met at a Gwar concert. Love named the band Hole after a line from Euripides' Medea ("There is a hole that pierces right through me") and a conversation in which her mother told her that she could not live her life "with a hole running through her". On July 23, 1989, Love married Leaving Trains vocalist James Moreland in Las Vegas; the marriage was annulled the same year. She later said that Moreland was a transvestite and that they had married "as a joke". After forming Hole, Love and Erlandson had a romantic relationship that lasted over a year.

In Hole's formative stages, Love continued to work at strip clubs in Hollywood (including Jumbo's Clown Room and the Seventh Veil), saving money to purchase backline equipment and a touring van, while rehearsing at a Hollywood studio loaned to her by the Red Hot Chili Peppers. Hole played their first show in November 1989 at Raji's, a rock club in central Hollywood. Their debut single, "Retard Girl", was issued in April 1990 through the Long Beach indie label Sympathy for the Record Industry and was played by Rodney Bingenheimer on local rock station KROQ. Hole appeared on the cover of Flipside, a Los Angeles-based punk fanzine. In early 1991, they released their second single, "Dicknail", through Sub Pop Records.

"Garbadge Man"
Track from Pretty on the Inside (1991), illustrating Love's aggressive vocals and heavy noise rock-influenced guitar.

With no wave, noise rock, and grindcore bands being major influences on Love, Hole's first studio album, Pretty on the Inside, captured an abrasive sound and contained disturbing, graphic lyrics, described by Q as "confrontational [and] genuinely uninhibited". The record was released in September 1991 on Caroline Records, produced by Kim Gordon of Sonic Youth with assistant production from Gumball's Don Fleming; Love and Gordon had met when Hole opened for Sonic Youth during their promotional tour for Goo at the Whisky a Go Go in November 1990. In early 1991, Love sent Gordon a personal letter asking her to produce the record for the band, to which she agreed.

Pretty on the Inside received generally positive critical reception from indie and punk rock critics and was named one of the 20 best albums of the year by Spin. It gained a following in the United Kingdom, charting at 59 on the UK Albums Chart, and its lead single, "Teenage Whore", entered the UK Indie Chart at number one. The album's feminist slant led many to tag the band as part of the riot grrrl movement, a movement with which Love did not associate. The band toured in support of the record, headlining with Mudhoney in Europe; in the United States, they opened for the Smashing Pumpkins, and performed at CBGB in New York City.

During the tour, Love briefly dated Smashing Pumpkins frontman Billy Corgan and then the Nirvana frontman Kurt Cobain. The journalist Michael Azerrad states that Love and Cobain met in 1989 at the Satyricon nightclub in Portland, Oregon. However, the Cobain biographer Charles Cross gives the date as February 12, 1990; Cross said that Cobain playfully wrestled Love to the floor after she said that he looked like Dave Pirner of Soul Asylum. According to Love, she met Cobain at a Dharma Bums show in Portland, while Love's bandmate Eric Erlandson said that he and Love were introduced to Cobain in a parking lot after a concert at the Hollywood Palladium on May 17, 1991. In late 1991, Love and Cobain became re-acquainted through Jennifer Finch, one of Love's friends and former bandmates. Love and Cobain were a couple by 1992.

=== 1992–1995: Marriage to Kurt Cobain, Live Through This and breakthrough ===
Just marrying [him] created a mythology around me that I didn't expect for myself, because I had a very controlled, five-year plan about how I was going to be successful in the rock industry. Marrying Kurt, it all kind of went sideways in a way that I could not control and I became seen in a certain light–a vilified light that made Yoko Ono look like Pollyanna–and I couldn't stop it.

— Love on her public image after marrying Kurt Cobain

Shortly after completing the tour for Pretty on the Inside, Love married Cobain on Waikiki Beach on February 24, 1992. She wore a satin and lace dress once owned by the actress Frances Farmer, and Cobain wore plaid pajamas. During Love's pregnancy, Hole recorded a cover of "Over the Edge" for a Wipers tribute album, and recorded their fourth single, "Beautiful Son", which was released in April 1993. On August 18, 1992, the couple's only child, a daughter, Frances Bean Cobain, was born in Los Angeles. They relocated to Carnation, Washington, and then Seattle.

Love's first major media exposure came in a September 1992 profile with Cobain for Vanity Fair by Lynn Hirschberg, titled "Strange Love". Cobain had become a major public figure following the surprise success of Nirvana's album Nevermind. Love was urged by her manager to participate in the cover story. During the prior year, Love and Cobain had developed a heroin addiction; the profile portrayed them in an unflattering light and suggested that Love had been addicted to heroin during her pregnancy. The Los Angeles Department of Children and Family Services investigated, and custody of Frances was temporarily awarded to Love's sister Jaimee. Love said she was misquoted by Hirschberg, and that she had immediately quit heroin during her first trimester once she discovered she was pregnant. Love later said the article had serious implications for her marriage and Cobain's mental state, suggesting it was a factor in his suicide two years later.

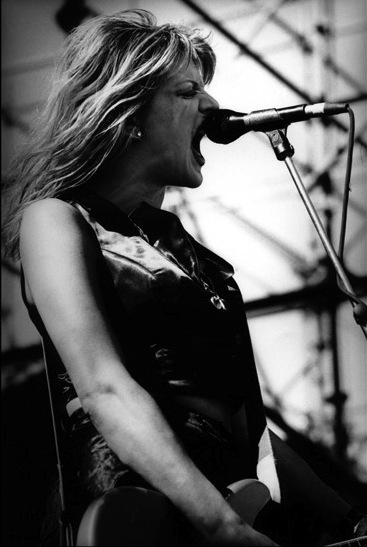
Love performing with Hole at Big Day Out, Melbourne, 1995

On September 8, 1993, Love and Cobain made their only public performance together at the Rock Against Rape benefit in Hollywood, performing two acoustic duets of "Pennyroyal Tea" and "Where Did You Sleep Last Night". Love also performed electric versions of two new Hole songs, "Doll Parts" and "Miss World", both written for their upcoming second album. In October 1993, Hole recorded their second album, Live Through This, in Atlanta. The album featured a new lineup with bassist Kristen Pfaff and drummer Patty Schemel.

In April 1994, Cobain committed suicide in the Seattle home he shared with Love, who was in rehab in Los Angeles at the time. In the following months, Love was rarely seen in public, staying at her home with friends and family. Cobain's remains were cremated and his ashes divided into portions by Love, who kept some in a teddy bear and some in an urn. In June, she traveled to the Namgyal Buddhist Monastery in Ithaca, New York and had Cobain's ashes ceremonially blessed by Buddhist monks. Another portion was mixed into clay and made into memorial sculptures.

Live Through This was released one week after Cobain's death on Geffen's subsidiary label DGC. On June 16, Pfaff died of a heroin overdose in Seattle. For Hole's impending tour, Love recruited the Canadian bassist Melissa Auf der Maur. Hole's performance on August 26, 1994, at the Reading Festival—Love's first public performance following Cobain's death—was described by MTV as "by turns macabre, frightening and inspirational". John Peel wrote in The Guardian that Love's disheveled appearance "would have drawn whistles of astonishment in Bedlam", and that her performance "verged on the heroic ... Love steered her band through a set which dared you to pity either her recent history or that of the band ... The band teetered on the edge of chaos, generating a tension which I cannot remember having felt before from any stage."

Live Through This was certified platinum in April 1995 and received numerous accolades. The success combined with Cobain's suicide produced publicity for Love, and she was featured on Barbara Walters' 10 Most Fascinating People in 1995. Her erratic onstage behavior and various legal troubles during Hole's tour compounded the media coverage of her. Hole performed a series of riotous concerts over the following year, with Love frequently appearing hysterical onstage, flashing crowds, stage diving, and getting into fights with audience members. One journalist reported that at the band's show in Boston in December 1994: "Love interrupted the music and talked about her deceased husband Kurt Cobain, and also broke out into Tourette syndrome-like rants. The music was great, but the raving was vulgar and offensive, and prompted some of the audience to shout back at her."

In January 1995, Love was arrested in Melbourne for disrupting a Qantas flight after getting into an argument with a flight attendant. On July 4, 1995, at the Lollapalooza Festival in George, Washington, Love threw a lit cigarette at musician Kathleen Hanna before punching her in the face, alleging that she had made a joke about her daughter. She pleaded guilty to an assault charge and was sentenced to anger management classes. In November 1995, two male teenagers sued Love for allegedly punching them during a Hole concert in Orlando, Florida in March 1995. The judge dismissed the case on grounds that the teens "weren't exposed to any greater amount of violence than could reasonably be expected at an alternative rock concert". Love later said she had little memory of 1994 and 1995, as she had been using large quantities of heroin and Rohypnol at the time.

=== 1996–2002: Acting success and Celebrity Skin ===
I went for that part so hard because I felt a need for atonement for some cultural damage that had arisen out of me and things that I had done. By doing that role, I felt that, personally and creatively, I could exemplify why this was the most un-glorious, unglamorous, fucked-up thing. And then, bang!, I was done with all that. I could fuck off and do something else.

— Love on her role in The People vs. Larry Flynt (1996)

After Hole's world tour concluded in 1996, Love made a return to acting, first in small roles in the Jean-Michel Basquiat biopic Basquiat and the drama Feeling Minnesota (1996), and then a starring role as Larry Flynt's wife Althea in Miloš Forman's critically acclaimed 1996 film The People vs. Larry Flynt. Love went through rehabilitation and quit using heroin at the insistence of Forman; she was ordered to take multiple urine tests under the supervision of Columbia Pictures while filming, and passed all of them. Despite Columbia Pictures' initial reluctance to hire Love due to her troubled past, her performance received acclaim, earning a Golden Globe nomination for Best Actress, and a New York Film Critics Circle Award for Best Supporting Actress. Critic Roger Ebert called her work in the film "quite a performance; Love proves she is not a rock star pretending to act, but a true actress." She won several other awards from various film critic associations for the film. During this time, Love maintained what the media noted as a more decorous public image, and she appeared in ad campaigns for Versace and in a Vogue Italia spread. Following the release of The People vs. Larry Flynt, she dated her co-star Edward Norton, with whom she remained until 1999.

In late 1997, Hole released the compilations My Body, the Hand Grenade and The First Session, both of which featured previously recorded material. Love attracted media attention in May 1998 after punching journalist Belissa Cohen at a party; the suit was settled out of court for an undisclosed sum. In September 1998, Hole released their third studio album, Celebrity Skin, which featured a stark power pop sound that contrasted with their earlier punk influences. Love divulged her ambition of making an album where "art meets commerce ... there are no compromises made, it has commercial appeal, and it sticks to [our] original vision." She said she was influenced by Neil Young, Fleetwood Mac, and My Bloody Valentine when writing the album. Smashing Pumpkins frontman Billy Corgan co-wrote several songs. Celebrity Skin was well received by critics; Rolling Stone called it "accessible, fiery and intimate—often at the same time ... a basic guitar record that's anything but basic." Celebrity Skin went multi-platinum, and topped "Best of Year" lists at Spin and The Village Voice. It garnered Hole's only number-one single on the Modern Rock Tracks chart with "Celebrity Skin". Hole promoted the album through MTV performances and at the 1998 Billboard Music Awards, and were nominated for three Grammy Awards at the 41st Grammy Awards ceremony.

Before the release of Celebrity Skin, Love and Fender designed a low-priced Squier brand guitar, the Vista Venus. The instrument featured a shape inspired by Mercury, a little-known independent guitar manufacturer, Stratocaster, and Rickenbacker's solid body guitars. It had a single-coil and a humbucker pickup and was available in 6-string and 12-string versions. In an early 1999 interview, Love said about the Venus: "I wanted a guitar that sounded really warm and pop, but which required just one box to go dirty ... And something that could also be your first band guitar. I didn't want it all teched out. I wanted it real simple, with just one pickup switch."

Hole toured with Marilyn Manson on the Beautiful Monsters Tour in 1999 under an agreement with their mutual label, Interscope Records, but dropped out after nine performances. Love and Manson disagreed over production costs, while Love also felt that his anti-religious onstage stunts—such as burning crosses and destroying Bibles—were offensive, characterizing his show as "evil." Hole resumed touring with Imperial Teen. She later expanded that Hole had also chosen to part ways with Manson and Korn (whom they also toured with in Australia) due to their sexualized treatment of teenage female audience members. Love told interviewers at 99X.FM in Atlanta: "What I really don't like—there are certain girls that like us, or like me, who are really messed up ... they're very young, and they do not need to be taken and raped, or filmed having enema contests ... [they were] going out into the audience and picking up fourteen and fifteen-year-old girls who obviously cut themselves, and then [I had] to see them in the morning ... it's just uncool."

In 1999, Love was awarded an Orville H. Gibson award for Best Female Rock Guitarist. During this time, she starred opposite Jim Carrey as his partner Lynne Margulies in the Andy Kaufman biopic Man on the Moon (1999), followed by a role as William S. Burroughs's wife Joan Vollmer in Beat (2000) alongside Kiefer Sutherland. Love was cast as the lead in John Carpenter's sci-fi horror film Ghosts of Mars, but backed out after injuring her foot. She sued the ex-wife of her then-boyfriend, James Barber, whom Love alleged had caused the injury by running over her foot with her Volvo. The following year, she returned to film opposite Lili Taylor in Julie Johnson (2001), in which she played a woman who has a lesbian relationship; Love won an Outstanding Actress award at L.A.'s Outfest. She was then cast in the thriller Trapped (2002), alongside Kevin Bacon and Charlize Theron. The film was a box-office flop.

In the interim, Hole had become dormant. In March 2001, Love began a "punk rock femme supergroup", Bastard, enlisting Schemel, Veruca Salt co-frontwoman Louise Post, and bassist Gina Crosley. Post recalled: "[Love] was like, 'Listen, you guys: I've been in my Malibu, manicure, movie-star world for two years, alright? I wanna make a record. And let's leave all that grunge shit behind us, eh? We were being so improvisational, and singing together, and with a trust developing between us. It was the shit." The group recorded a demo tape, but by September 2001, Post and Crosley had left, with Post citing "unhealthy and unprofessional working conditions". In May 2002, Hole announced their breakup amid continuing litigation with Universal Music Group over their record contract.

In 1997, Love and former Nirvana members Krist Novoselic and Dave Grohl formed a limited liability company, Nirvana LLC, to manage Nirvana's business dealings. In June 2001, Love filed a lawsuit to dissolve it, blocking the release of unreleased Nirvana material and delaying the release of the Nirvana compilation With the Lights Out. Grohl and Novoselic sued Love, calling her "irrational, mercurial, self-centered, unmanageable, inconsistent and unpredictable". She responded with a letter stating that "Kurt Cobain was Nirvana" and that she and his family were the "rightful heirs" to the Nirvana legacy.

=== 2003–2008: Solo work and legal troubles ===
In February 2003, Love was arrested at Heathrow Airport for disrupting a flight and was banned from Virgin Airlines. In October, she was arrested in Los Angeles after breaking several windows of her producer and then-boyfriend James Barber's home and was charged with being under the influence of a controlled substance; the ordeal resulted in her temporarily losing custody of her daughter.

After the breakup of Hole, Love began composing material with songwriter Linda Perry, and in July 2003 signed a contract with Virgin Records. She began recording her debut solo album, America's Sweetheart, in France shortly after. Virgin Records released America's Sweetheart in February 2004; it received mixed reviews. Charles Aaron of Spin called it a "jaw-dropping act of artistic will and a fiery, proper follow-up to 1994's Live Through This" and awarded it eight out of ten, while Amy Phillips of The Village Voice wrote: "[Love is] willing to act out the dream of every teenage brat who ever wanted to have a glamorous, high-profile hissyfit, and she turns those egocentric nervous breakdowns into art. Sure, the art becomes less compelling when you've been pulling the same stunts for a decade. But, honestly, is there anybody out there who fucks up better?" The album sold fewer than 100,000 copies. Love later expressed regret over the record, blaming her drug problems at the time. Shortly after it was released, she told Kurt Loder on TRL: "I cannot exist as a solo artist. It's a joke."

On March 17, 2004, Love appeared on the Late Show with David Letterman to promote America's Sweetheart. Her appearance drew media coverage when she lifted her shirt multiple times, stood on Letterman's desk and flashed him. The New York Times wrote: "The episode was not altogether surprising for Ms. Love, 39, whose most public moments have veered from extreme pathos—like the time she read the suicide note of her famous husband, Kurt Cobain, on MTV—to angry feminism to catfights to incoherent ranting." Hours later, in the early morning of March 18, Love was arrested in Manhattan for allegedly striking a fan with a microphone stand during a small concert in the East Village. She was released within hours and performed a scheduled concert the following evening at the Bowery Ballroom. Four days later, she called in multiple times to The Howard Stern Show, claiming in broadcast conversations with Stern that the incident had not occurred, and that actress Natasha Lyonne, who was at the concert, was told by the alleged victim that he had been paid $10,000 to file a false claim leading to Love's arrest.

On July 9, 2004, her 40th birthday, Love was arrested for failing to make a court appearance for the March 2004 charges, and taken to Bellevue Hospital, allegedly incoherent, where she was placed on a 72-hour watch. According to police, she was believed to be a potential danger to herself, but deemed mentally sound and released to a rehab facility two days later. Amidst public criticism and press coverage, comedian Margaret Cho published an opinion piece, "Courtney Deserves Better from Feminists", arguing that negative associations of Love with her drug and personal problems (including from feminists) overshadowed her music and wellbeing. Love pleaded guilty in October 2004 to disorderly conduct over the incident in East Village.

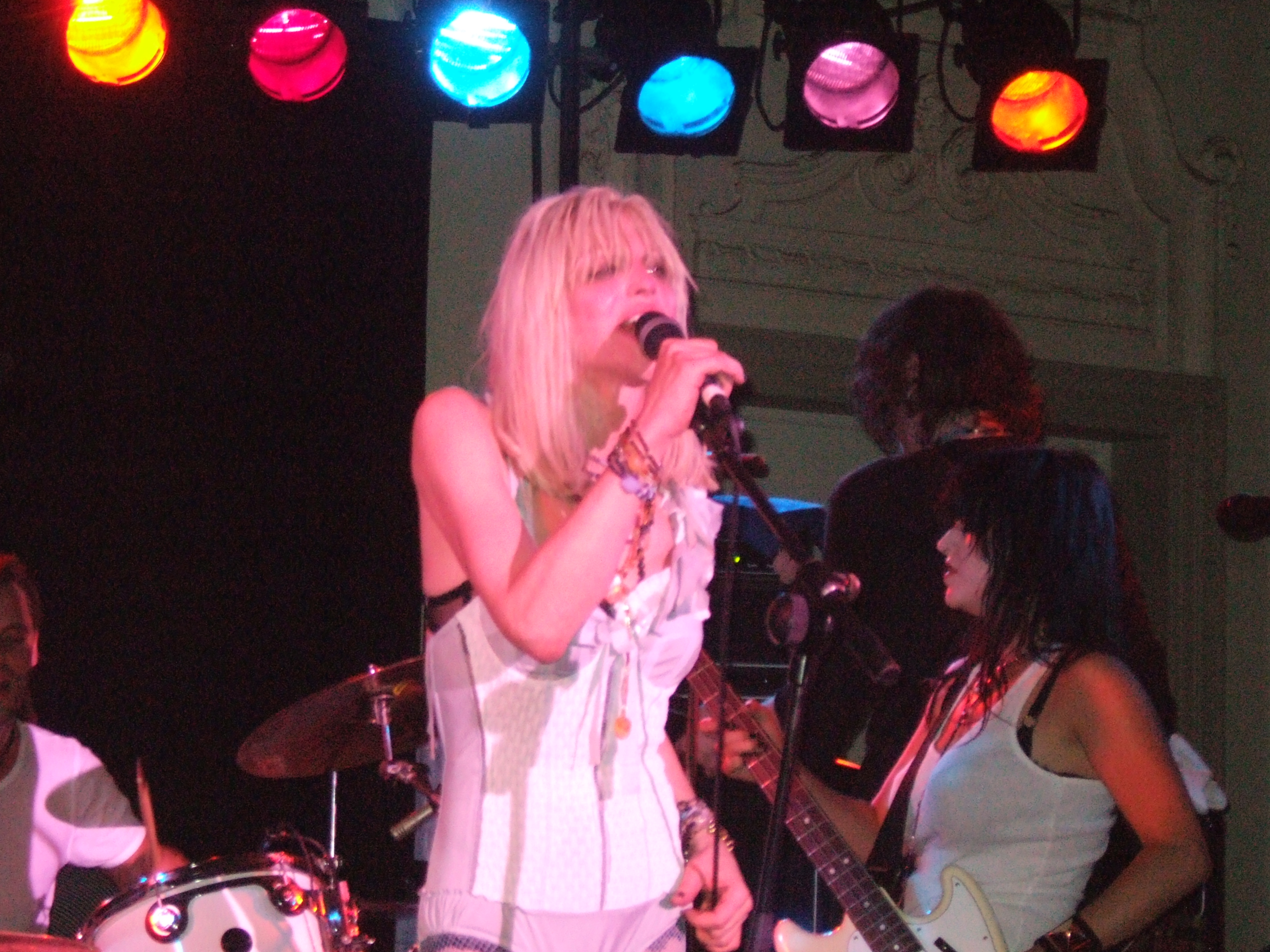
Love performing in London, 2007

Love's appearance as a roaster on the Comedy Central Roast of Pamela Anderson in August 2005, in which she appeared intoxicated and disheveled, attracted further media attention. One review said that Love "acted as if she belonged in an institution". Six days after the broadcast, Love was sentenced to a 28-day lockdown rehab program for being under the influence of a controlled substance, violating her probation. To avoid jail time, she accepted an additional 180-day rehab sentence in September 2005. In November 2005, after completing the program, Love was discharged from the rehab center under the provision that she complete further outpatient rehab. In subsequent interviews, Love said she had been addicted to substances including prescription drugs, cocaine, and crack cocaine. She said she had been sober since completing rehabilitation in 2007, and cited her Soka Gakkai Buddhist practice (which she began in 1988) as integral to her sobriety.

In the midst of her legal troubles, Love had endeavors in writing and publishing. She co-wrote a semi-autobiographical manga, Princess Ai (Japanese: プリンセス·アイ物語), with Stu Levy, illustrated by Misaho Kujiradou and Ai Yazawa; it was released in three volumes in the United States and Japan between 2004 and 2006. In 2006, Love published a memoir, Dirty Blonde, and began recording her second solo album, How Dirty Girls Get Clean, collaborating again with Perry and Billy Corgan. Love had written several songs, including an anti-cocaine song titled "Loser Dust", during her time in rehab in 2005. She told Billboard: "My hand-eye coordination was so bad [after the drug use], I didn't even know chords anymore. It was like my fingers were frozen. And I wasn't allowed to make noise [in rehab] ... I never thought I would work again." Tracks and demos for the album leaked online in 2006, and a documentary, The Return of Courtney Love, detailing the making of the album, aired on the British television network More4 in the fall of that year. A rough acoustic version of "Never Go Hungry Again", recorded during an interview for The Times in November, was also released. Incomplete audio clips of the song "Samantha", originating from an interview with NPR, were distributed on the internet in 2007.

=== 2009–2012: Hole revival and visual art ===
Love at the premiere of Wall Street: Money Never Sleeps, 2010

In March 2009, fashion designer Dawn Simorangkir brought a libel suit against Love concerning a defamatory post Love made on her Twitter account, which was eventually settled for $450,000. Several months later, in June 2009, NME published an article detailing Love's plan to reunite Hole and release a new album, Nobody's Daughter. In response, former Hole guitarist Eric Erlandson stated in Spin magazine that contractually no reunion could take place without his involvement; therefore Nobody's Daughter would remain Love's solo record, as opposed to a "Hole" record. Love responded to Erlandson's comments in a Twitter post, claiming "he's out of his mind, Hole is my band, my name, and my Trademark". Nobody's Daughter was released worldwide as a Hole album on April 27, 2010. For the new line-up, Love recruited guitarist Micko Larkin, Shawn Dailey (bass guitar), and Stu Fisher (drums, percussion). Nobody's Daughter featured material written and recorded for Love's unfinished solo album, How Dirty Girls Get Clean, including "Pacific Coast Highway", "Letter to God", "Samantha", and "Never Go Hungry", although they were re-produced in the studio with Larkin and engineer Michael Beinhorn. The album's subject matter was largely centered on Love's tumultuous life between 2003 and 2007, and featured a polished folk rock sound, and more acoustic guitar work than previous Hole albums.

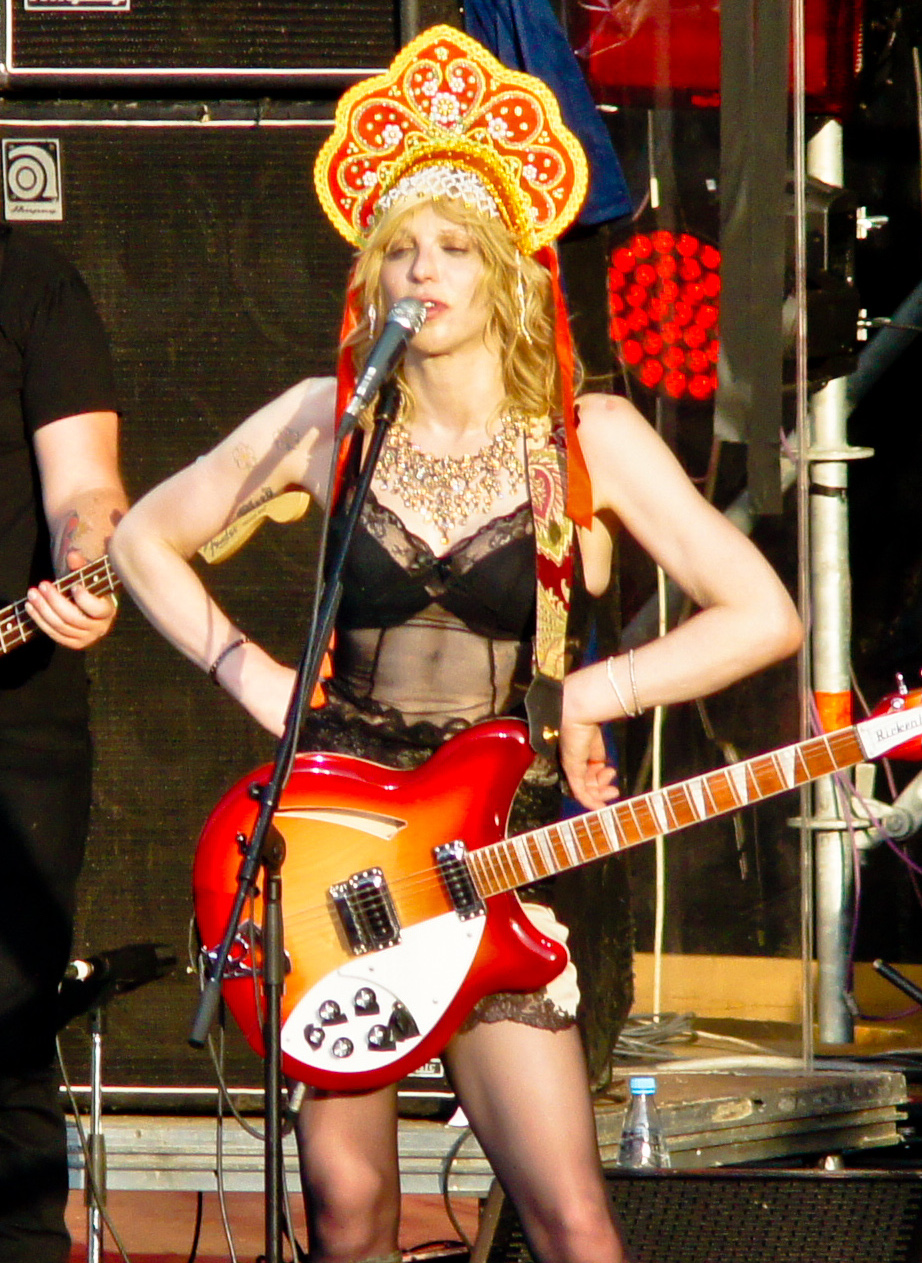
Love performing with Hole at Afisha Picnic in Moscow, 2011

The first single from Nobody's Daughter was "Skinny Little Bitch", released to promote the album in March 2010. The album received mixed reviews. Robert Sheffield of Rolling Stone gave the album three out of five, saying Love "worked hard on these songs, instead of just babbling a bunch of druggy bullshit and assuming people would buy it, the way she did on her 2004 flop, America's Sweetheart". Sal Cinquemani of Slant Magazine also gave the album three out of five: "It's Marianne Faithfull's substance-ravaged voice that comes to mind most often while listening to songs like 'Honey' and 'For Once in Your Life'. The latter track is, in fact, one of Love's most raw and vulnerable vocal performances to date ... the song offers a rare glimpse into the mind of a woman who, for the last 15 years, has been as famous for being a rock star as she's been for being a victim." Love and the band toured internationally from 2010 into late 2012 promoting the record, with their pre-release shows in London and at South by Southwest receiving critical acclaim. In 2011, Love participated in Hit So Hard, a documentary chronicling bandmate Schemel's time in Hole.

In May 2012, Love debuted an art collection at Fred Torres Collaborations in New York titled "And She's Not Even Pretty", which contained over 40 drawings and paintings by Love composed in ink, colored pencil, pastels, and watercolors. Later in the year, she collaborated with Michael Stipe on the track "Rio Grande" for Johnny Depp's sea shanty album Son of Rogues Gallery, and in 2013, co-wrote and contributed vocals on "Rat A Tat" from Fall Out Boy's album Save Rock and Roll, also appearing in the song's music video.

=== 2013–2015: Return to acting; libel lawsuits ===
After dropping the Hole name and performing as a solo artist in late 2012, Love appeared in spring 2013 advertisements for Yves Saint Laurent alongside Kim Gordon and Ariel Pink. Love completed a solo tour of North America in mid-2013, which was purported to be in promotion of an upcoming solo album; however, it was ultimately dubbed a "greatest hits" tour, and featured songs from Love's and Hole's back catalogue. Love told Billboard at the time that she had recorded eight songs in the studio.

Love was subject of a second landmark libel lawsuit brought against her in January 2014 by her former attorney Rhonda Holmes, who accused Love of online defamation, seeking $8 million in damages. It was the first case of alleged Twitter-based libel in U.S. history to make it to trial. The jury, however, found in Love's favor. A subsequent defamation lawsuit filed by fashion designer Simorangkir in February 2014, however, resulted in Love being ordered to pay a further $350,000 in recompense.

On April 22, 2014, Love debuted the song "You Know My Name" on BBC Radio 6 to promote her tour of the United Kingdom. It was released as a double A-side single with the song "Wedding Day" on May 4, 2014, on her own label Cherry Forever Records via Kobalt Label Services. The tracks were produced by Michael Beinhorn, and feature Tommy Lee on drums. In an interview with the BBC, Love revealed that she and former Hole guitarist Eric Erlandson had reconciled, and had been rehearsing new material together, along with former bassist Melissa Auf der Maur and drummer Patty Schemel, though she did not confirm a reunion of the band. On May 1, 2014, in an interview with Pitchfork, Love commented further on the possibility of Hole reuniting, saying: "I'm not going to commit to it happening, because we want an element of surprise. There's a lot of is to be dotted and ts to be crossed."

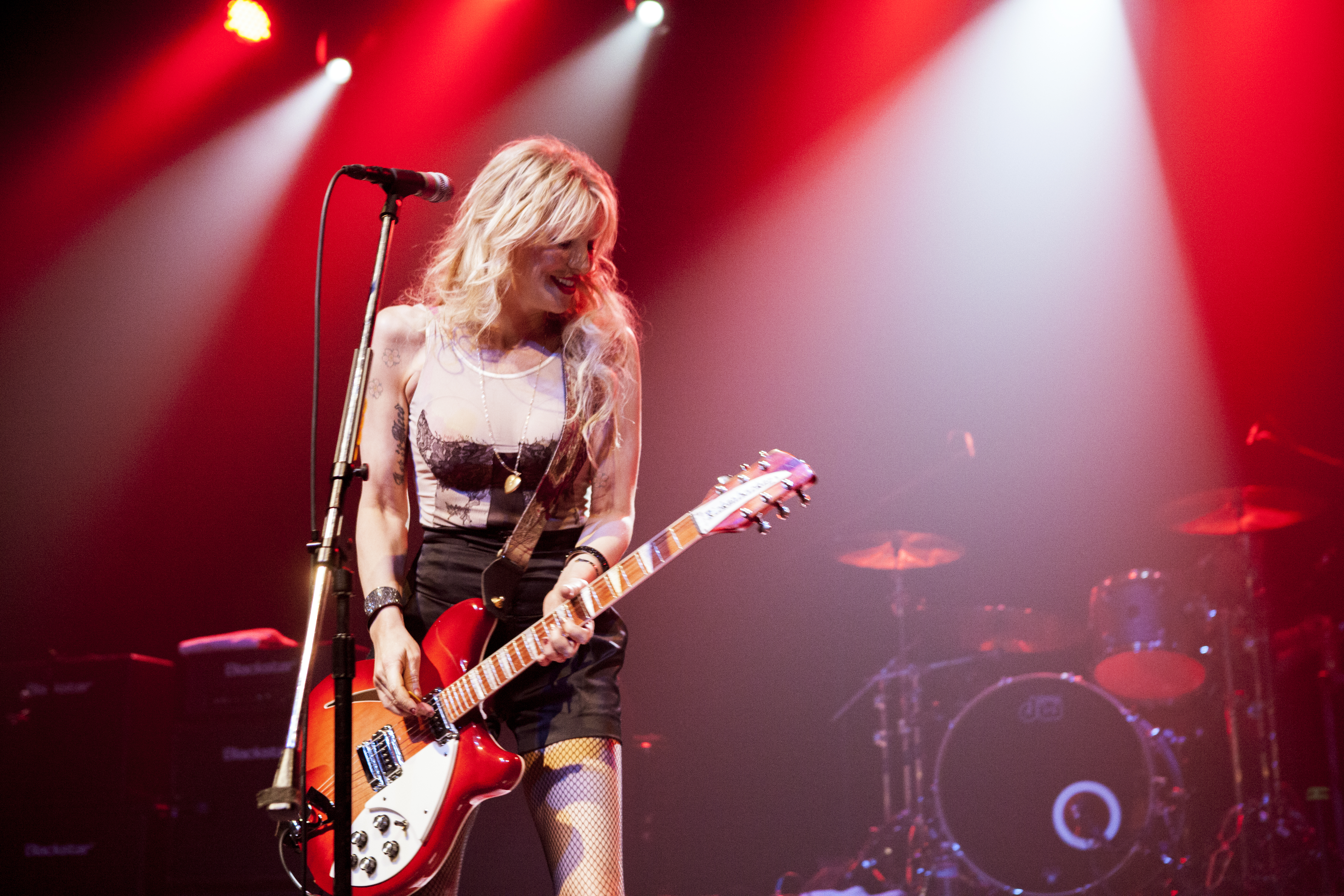
Love performing in Ventura, California, 2015

Love was cast in several television series in supporting parts throughout 2014, including the FX series Sons of Anarchy, Revenge, and Lee Daniels' network series Empire in a recurring guest role as Elle Dallas. The track "Walk Out on Me", featuring Love, was included on the Empire: Original Soundtrack from Season 1 album, which debuted at No. 1 on the Billboard 200. Alexis Petridis of The Guardian praised the track, saying: "The idea of Courtney Love singing a ballad with a group of gospel singers seems faintly terrifying ... The reality is brilliant. Love's voice fits the careworn lyrics, effortlessly summoning the kind of ravaged darkness that Lana Del Rey nearly ruptures herself trying to conjure up."

In January 2015, Love starred in a New York City stage production, Kansas City Choir Boy, a "pop opera" conceived by and co-starring Todd Almond. Charles Isherwood of The New York Times praised her performance, noting a "soft-edged and bewitching" stage presence, and wrote: "Her voice, never the most supple or rangy of instruments, retains the singular sound that made her an electrifying front woman for the band Hole: a single sustained noted can seem to simultaneously contain a plea, a wound and a threat." The show toured later in the year, with performances in Boston and Los Angeles. In April 2015, the journalist Anthony Bozza sued Love, alleging a contractual violation regarding his co-writing of her memoir. Love performed as the opening act for Lana Del Rey on her Endless Summer Tour for eight West Coast shows in May and June 2015. During her tenure, Love debuted the single "Miss Narcissist", released on Wavves' independent label Ghost Ramp. She was also cast in a supporting role in James Franco's film The Long Home, based on the novel by William Gay, her first film role in over ten years; as of 2022, it remains unreleased.

=== 2016–present: Fashion and forthcoming music ===
In January 2016, Love released a clothing line in collaboration with Sophia Amoruso, "Love, Courtney", featuring 18 pieces reflecting her personal style. In November 2016, she began filming A Midsummer's Nightmare, the pilot for a Shakespeare anthology series adapted for Lifetime. She starred as Kitty Menendez in Menendez: Blood Brothers, a biopic television film based on the lives of Lyle and Erik Menendez, which premiered on Lifetime in June 2017.

In 2017, Love accompanied the museum director Nicholas Cullinan to the GQ Men of the Year awards at the Tate Modern, calling him her "soulmate" and her "family for life". In October, shortly after the Harvey Weinstein sexual abuse cases became public, a 2005 video of Love warning young actresses about Weinstein went viral. In the footage, while on the red carpet for the Comedy Central Roast of Pamela Anderson, Love was asked by Natasha Leggero if she had any advice for "a young girl moving to Hollywood"; she responded, "If Harvey Weinstein invites you to a private party in the Four Seasons [hotel], don't go." She later tweeted, "Although I wasn't one of his victims, I was eternally banned by Creative Artists Agency for speaking out."

In the same year, Love was cast in Justin Kelly's biopic JT LeRoy, portraying a film producer opposite Laura Dern. In March 2018, she appeared in the music video for Marilyn Manson's "Tattooed in Reverse", and in April she appeared as a guest judge on RuPaul's Drag Race. In December, Love was awarded a restraining order against Sam Lutfi, who had acted as her manager for the previous six years, alleging verbal abuse and harassment. Her daughter, Frances, and sister, Jaimee, were also awarded restraining orders against Lutfi. In January 2019, a Los Angeles County judge extended the three-year order to five years, citing Lutfi's tendency to "prey upon people".

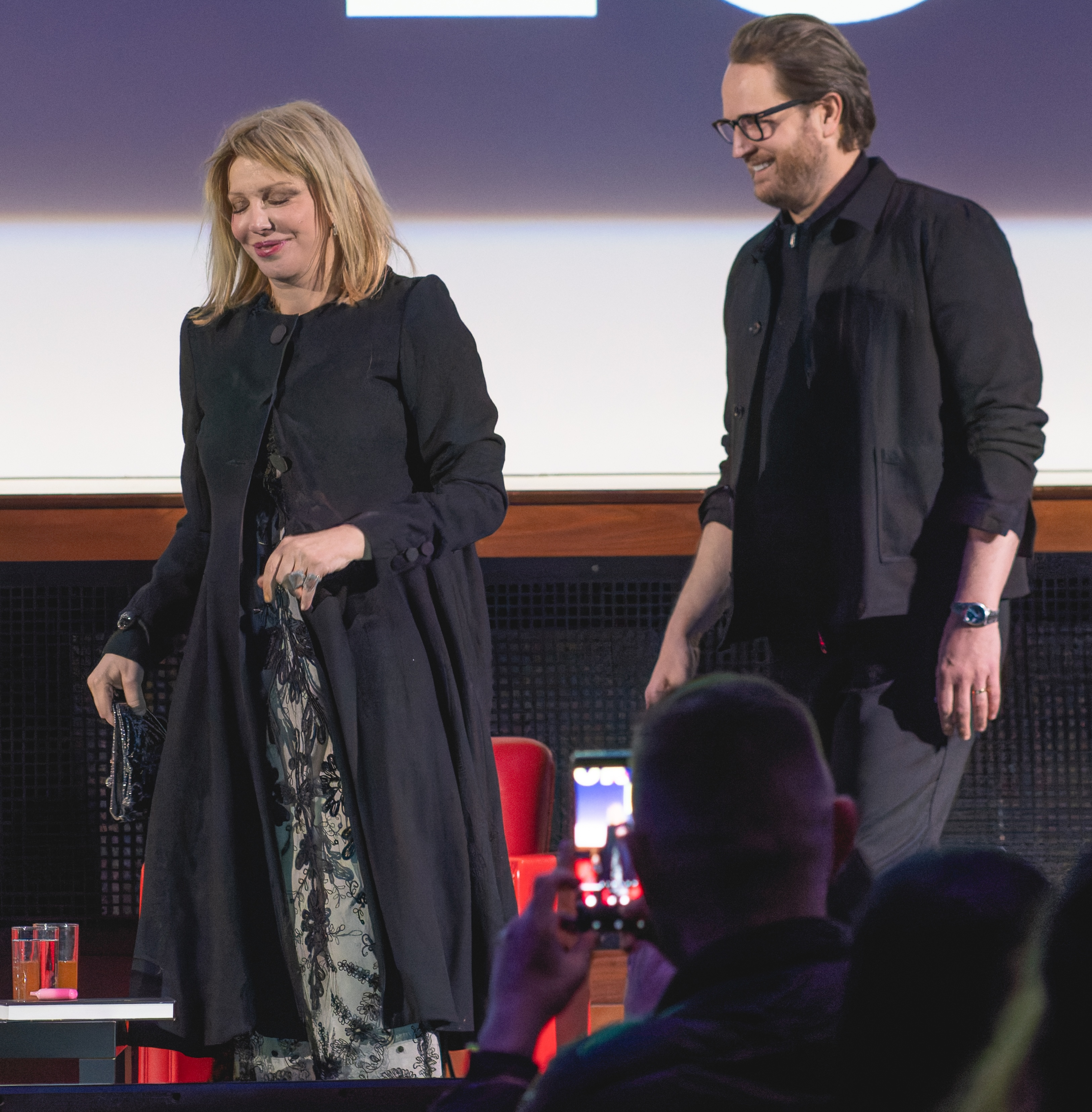
Love with Todd Almond in London, March 4, 2025

On August 18, 2019, Love performed a solo set at the Yola Día festival in Los Angeles, which also featured performances by Cat Power and Lykke Li. On September 9, Love garnered press attention when she publicly criticized Joss Sackler, an heiress to the Sackler family OxyContin fortune, after she allegedly offered Love $100,000 to attend her fashion show during New York Fashion Week. In the same statement, Love indicated that she had relapsed into opioid addiction in 2018, stating that she had recently celebrated a year of sobriety. In October 2019, Love relocated from Los Angeles to London.

On November 21, 2019, Love recorded the song "Mother", written and produced by Lawrence Rothman, as part of the soundtrack for the horror film The Turning (2020). In January 2020, she received the Icon Award at the NME Awards; NME described her as "one of the most influential singers in alternative culture of the last 30 years". The following month, she confirmed she was writing a new record which she described as "really sad ... [I'm] writing in minor chords, and that appeals to my sadness." In March 2021, Love said she had been hospitalized with acute anemia in August 2020, which had nearly killed her and reduced her weight to 97 pounds (44 kg); she made a full recovery.

In August 2022, Love announced the completion of her memoir, The Girl with the Most Cake, after a nearly ten-year period of writing. She was featured as a guest vocalist on the track "Song to the Siren" by rapper 070 Shake, from her studio album Petrichor, which was released on November 15, 2024. On December 10, 2025, it was announced that a documentary film on Love, titled Antiheroine, was set to premiere at the 2026 Sundance Film Festival. The documentary follows Love after her 2019 relocation to London, focusing on her sobriety and recording of her forthcoming album.

== Artistry ==
=== Musical style and classification ===
Musically, Love's work with Hole and her solo efforts have been characterized as alternative rock; Hole's early material, however, was described by critics as being stylistically closer to grindcore and aggressive punk rock. Spin's October 1991 review of Hole's first album noted Love's layering of harsh and abrasive riffs buried more sophisticated musical arrangements. Vice stated that "while Nirvana were masters at taking pop melodies and making them sound bleak, brutal and beautiful, Courtney seemed to disregard melody entirely – particularly on Hole’s Pretty on the Inside – instead zeroing in on raw emotions and hurling them at the sky, like a wolf howling at the full moon." In 1998, Love stated that Hole had "always been a pop band. We always had a subtext of pop. I always talked about it, if you go back ... what'll sound like some weird Sonic Youth tuning back then to you was sounding like the Raspberries to me, in my demented pop framework."

She was later associated with the riot grrrl movement, though she rejects association with this term.

=== Lyrical themes ===
Love's lyrics are composed from a female's point of view, and her lyrics have been described as "literate and mordant" and noted by scholars for "articulating a third-wave feminist consciousness." Simon Reynolds, in reviewing Hole's debut album, noted: "Ms. Love's songs explore the full spectrum of female emotions, from vulnerability to rage. The songs are fueled by adolescent traumas, feelings of disgust about the body, passionate friendships with women and the desire to escape domesticity. Her lyrical style could be described as emotional nudism." Journalist and critic Kim France, in critiquing Love's lyrics, referred to her as a "dark genius" and likened her work to that of Anne Sexton. Vice stated that Love's lyrics sounded "like a wry 'fuck you' to all of her then-detractors, as well the ones that would emerge in the future."

Love has remarked that lyrics have always been the most important component of songwriting for her: "The important thing for me ... is it has to look good on the page. I mean, you can love Led Zeppelin and not love their lyrics ... but I made a big effort in my career to have what's on the page mean something." Common topics in Love's early lyrics included body image, rape, suicide, conformity, pregnancy, prostitution, and death. In a 1991 interview with Everett True, she said: "I try to place [beautiful imagery] next to fucked up imagery, because that's how I view things ... I sometimes feel that no one's taken the time to write about certain things in rock, that there's a certain female point of view that's never been given space."

Critics have noted that Love's later musical work is more lyrically introspective. Celebrity Skin and America's Sweetheart are lyrically centered on celebrity life, Hollywood, and drug addiction, while still preoccupied with themes of vanity and body image. Nobody's Daughter was lyrically reflective of Love's past relationships and her struggle for sobriety, with the majority of its lyrics written while she was in rehab in 2006.

=== Vocal style ===
Love has a contralto vocal range. According to Love, she never wanted to be a singer, but rather aspired to be a skilled guitarist: "I'm such a lazy bastard though that I never did that", she said. "I was always the only person with the nerve to sing, and so I got stuck with it." She has been regularly noted by critics for her husky vocals as well as her "banshee [-like]" screaming abilities. Vice said her vocals sounded like they were "spat out like bitter-tasting fruit". Her vocals have been compared to those of Johnny Rotten, and David Fricke of Rolling Stone described them as "lung-busting" and "a corrosive, lunatic wail". Upon the release of Hole's 2010 album, Nobody's Daughter, Amanda Petrusich of Pitchfork compared Love's raspy, unpolished vocals to those of Bob Dylan.

=== Guitar playing style ===
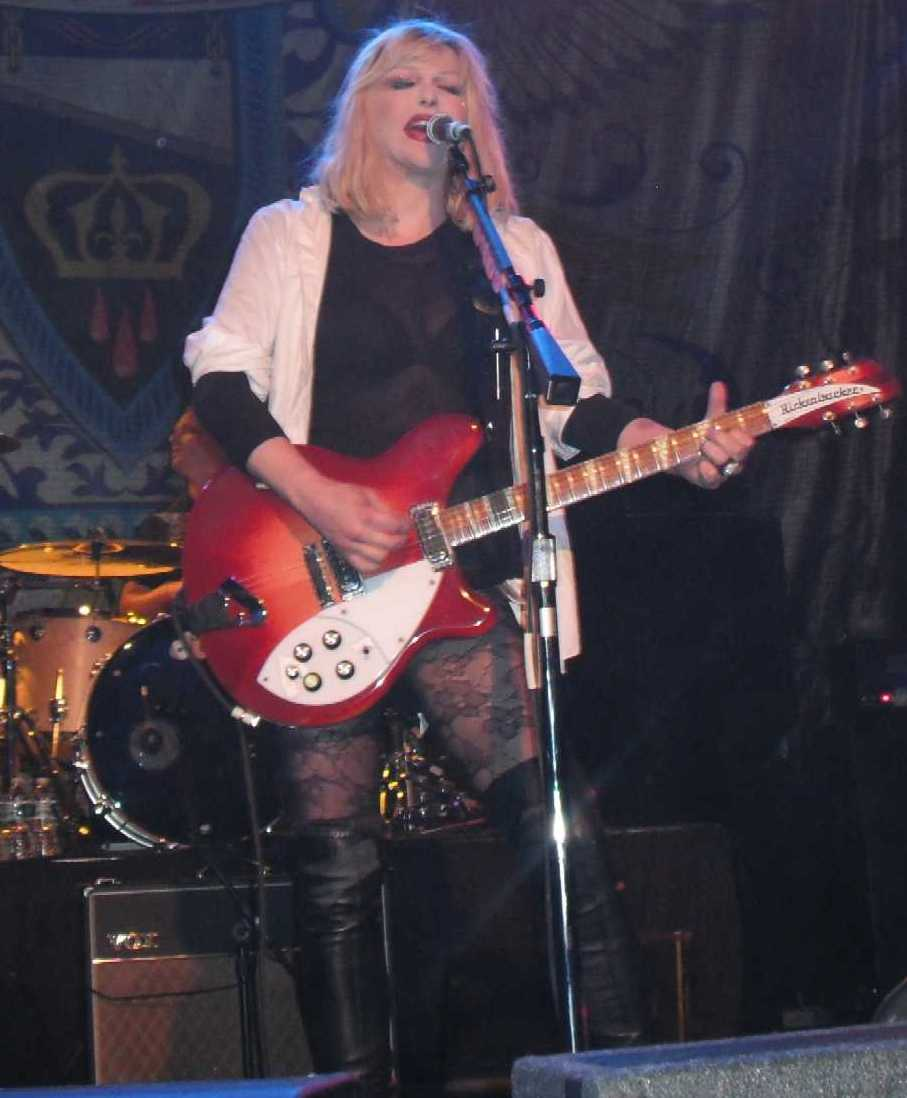
Love, playing a Rickenbacker 360 in 2010, has played both Fender and Rickenbacker guitars throughout her career

Love is considered to have a minimalist guitar playing style. She has referred to herself as "a shit guitar player", further commenting in a 2014 interview: "I can still write a song, but [the guitar playing] sounds like shit ... I used to be a good rhythm player but I am no longer dependable." Vice described her guitar riffs as "spiky [and] unhinged". Pitchfork described the style as consisting of "thick, indiscriminate guitar goo" and "dated grunge crunch". Sound engineer Danielle DePalma told Flavorwire: "It is not so out of the ordinary for a front person to mimic, or minimize, their guitar playing for the sake of a live show experience. The front person is there to unify the crowd and the band, and create a great show."

She began taking guitar lessons during the COVID-19 lockdowns in an attempt to polish her style.

=== Influences ===
Love has cited numerous musical acts and performers as influences, among the earliest being Patti Smith, the Runaways, and the Pretenders. As a child, her first exposure to music was records that her parents received each month through Columbia Record Club. The first album Love owned was Leonard Cohen's Songs of Leonard Cohen (1967), which she obtained from her mother: "He was so lyric-conscious and morbid, and I was a pretty morbid kid", she recalled. As a teenager, she named Flipper, Kate Bush, Soft Cell, Joni Mitchell, Laura Nyro, Lou Reed, and Dead Kennedys among her favorite artists. At age 15, Love attended a Virgin Prunes concert in Dublin which she credited as a pivotal influence: "I had never seen so much sex, snarl, poetry, evil, restraint, grace, filth, raw power and the very essence of rock and roll... [I had seen] U2 [who] gave me lashes of love and inspiration, and a few nights later the Virgin Prunes fucked–me–up." Decades later, in 2009, Love introduced the band's frontman Gavin Friday at a Carnegie Hall event, and performed a song with him.

Though often associated with punk music, Love has noted that her most significant musical influences have been post-punk and new wave artists. Commenting in 2021, Love said:

There's this idea of "Courtney is punk and stuck in 1995!" but that's not the case. I was more [influenced by] new wave or post-punk. My number one greatest song of all time is "Love Will Tear Us Apart" by Joy Division, and I will take no fucking prisoners in that battle. But the band that affected me more than even Leonard Cohen and Bob Dylan was Echo and the Bunnymen.

Over the years, Love has also named several other new wave and post-punk bands as influences, including the Smiths, Siouxsie and the Banshees, Television, and Bauhaus.

Love's diverse genre interests were illustrated in a 1991 interview with Flipside, in which she stated: "There's a part of me that wants to have a grindcore band and another that wants to have a Raspberries-type pop band." Discussing the abrasive sound of Hole's debut album, she said she felt she had to "catch up with all my hip peers who'd gone all indie on me, and who made fun of me for liking R.E.M. and The Smiths." She has also embraced the influence of experimental artists and punk rock groups, including Sonic Youth, Swans, Big Black, Diamanda Galás, the Germs, and the Stooges. While writing Celebrity Skin, she drew influence from Neil Young and My Bloody Valentine. She has also cited her contemporary PJ Harvey as an influence, saying: "The one rock star that makes me know I'm shit is Polly Harvey. I'm nothing next to the purity that she experiences."

Literature and poetry have often been a major influence on her songwriting; Love said she had "always wanted to be a poet, but there was no money in it." She has named the works of T. S. Eliot and Charles Baudelaire as influential, and referenced works by Dante Rossetti, William Shakespeare, Rudyard Kipling, and Anne Sexton in her lyrics.

=== Live performances ===
Throughout her career, she has also garnered a reputation for unpredictable live shows. In the 1990s, her performances with Hole were characterized by confrontational behavior, with Love stage diving, smashing guitars or throwing them into the audience, wandering into the crowd at the end of sets, and engaging in sometimes incoherent rants. Critics and journalists have noted Love for her comical, often stream-of-consciousness-like stage banter. Music journalist Robert Hilburn wrote in 1993 that, "rather than simply scripted patter, Love's comments between songs [have] the natural feel of someone who is sharing her immediate feelings." A review of a live performance published in 2010 said Love's onstage "one-liners [were] worthy of the Comedy Store". She has also stated that she screams "fuck you" at her live audiences in a "loving manner," and that they scream the obscene phrase back at her.

Fans are known for weeping during Love's live performances, though she has stated that she does not understand this phenomenon: "Does that make me sound cold? I just don't get off on my audience like that."

== Equipment ==
Love has played a variety of Fender guitars throughout her career, including a Jaguar and a vintage 1965 Jazzmaster; the latter was purchased by the Hard Rock Cafe and is on display in New York City. Between 1989 and 1991, Love primarily played a Rickenbacker 425 because she "preferred the 3/4 neck", but she destroyed the guitar onstage at a 1991 concert opening for the Smashing Pumpkins. In the mid-1990s, she often played a guitar made by Mercury, an obscure company that manufactured custom guitars, as well as a Univox Hi-Flier. Fender's Vista Venus, designed by Love in 1998, was partially inspired by Rickenbacker guitars as well as her Mercury. During tours after the release of Nobody's Daughter (post-2010), Love has played a Rickenbacker 360 onstage. Her setup has included Fender tube gear, Matchless, Ampeg, Silvertone and a solid-state 1976 Randall Commander. She also uses an Electro-Harmonix Big Muff Pi and a Boss DS-1 for fuzz and distortion effects, respectively.

== Fashion ==
Love is considered one of the pioneers of the "kinderwhore" aesthetic image, particularly for fashion stylings in the early 1990s. Her subversive style was known for wearing vintage babydoll dresses made of silk, Mary Jane shoes and platform shoes, knee-high socks, ripped fishnets, flannel shirts, bleached hair, crimson lipstick and "smudged eyeliner". American fashion magazine Vogue stated that "whether or not you were a fan of Hole, or even grunge more generally when the genre hit its peak, Love’s feminine, tough, and wholly unapologetic sense of style can still be a fertile source of inspiration." MTV reporter Kurt Loder described Love as looking like "a debauched rag doll" onstage. Love later said she had been influenced by the fashion of Chrissy Amphlett of the Divinyls. Interviewed in 1994, Love commented "I would like to think–in my heart of hearts–that I'm changing some psychosexual aspects of rock music. Not that I'm so desirable. I didn't do the kinder-whore thing because I thought I was so hot. When I see the look used to make one more appealing, it pisses me off. When I started, it was a What Ever Happened to Baby Jane? thing. My angle was irony."

== Public image ==
Vanity Fair wrote in 1995: "Grunge queen Courtney Love is on her way to becoming the most powerful female rock icon in the country, but she thinks everybody wants her dead." The New Yorker wrote in 1998: "Much like Madonna, whom she rivals in her attention-seeking, and whom she credits with paving the way for her dissy, fuck-all style, Love says she has always wanted to be famous, and, now that she’s made it out of the shadows, she shows every sign of hanging on to the spotlight for longer than fifteen minutes." Regarding her public persona and image, Love said: "People used to say that I was so difficult. They said I was disagreeable. Yes, I am completely disagreeable and I’m never going to apologize for that. I always wanted to be known as a bitch. Being liked was never my thing. I had a bitch capacity and I was cool with not being liked. I saw Bob Dylan in Don’t Look Back and he didn’t want to be liked and I thought, yeah, I want to be like that." She said Kurt Cobain did in fact want "to be liked". She recalled: "He was able to hide behind me, but then I got hated. Then [he] died, and the hatred towards me reached a completely new level. I did not plan for that."

Love has an online presence. She is known for her eccentric personal blogs in which she has unapologetically revealed intricate details regarding her personal life. The Guardian wrote in 2008: "Courtney Love's blogging is candid, meandering, and often incomprehensible. She exemplifies the term 'TMI' – too much information, discussing the size of Reznor's penis or the way she has various wrong-doers 'by the scrotum'. But she also seems to be aware of her tendency for over-sharing." NME wrote: "There’s a certain type of public figure that we all follow on Twitter for the sheer reason of revelling in their often-provocative thoughts – they may be divisive, controversial or inflammatory, but, boy, do they sure brighten up your timeline. Courtney Love has a chequered past when it comes to social media, making her account an almost-essential follow for the sheer unpredictability of her Twitter policy." She also had a presence on Etsy, Twitter and Myspace. HuffPost called her Myspace blog a "mess". She was sued by a fashion designer for defamation on Twitter. Love said: "I'm not a social network genius, as evidenced by being the first and only person ever to have a Twitter lawsuit. At the time that lawsuit happened, I didn't even really fully get what Twitter was for or how it worked." She paid a settlement of $430,000 to the defendant.

She threw makeup at Madonna during the 1995 MTV Video Music Awards. She stage dived into the crowd at the WHFS Festival in 1995 after she was offended by an audience member's shirt.

In 2010, she received a Brazilian wax in the middle of an interview with Q Magazine in front of many journalists. She then poured champagne on herself before going streaking in the streets. Also in 2010, she reportedly stole $100,000 worth of jewelry from American designer Jacob Arabo, known professionally as "Jacob the Jeweler". He sued her but ultimately did not recover his possessions from her. Love claimed to have misplaced the jewelry while it was in her possession. That same year, she greeted a New York Times journalist while nude. She apologized to the journalist the following day and attributed the incident to a combination of the SSRI antidepressant Sertraline (Zoloft) and alcohol. She said: "I’m so humiliated. That simply isn’t me. It has been, but I haven’t been such a mess for quite some time. I trust you understand that our hearts can take us all to dark and ill timed places."

Members of the fashion industry have came to Love's defense in response to media vitriol towards her. Brazilian fashion designer Francisco Costa of Calvin Klein told the Times: “I do not look at her negatively at all. We all have baggage in life.” Italian fashion designer Riccardo Tisci said of Love: "I judge Courtney as a human being and as an artist. Sometimes she does some crazy stuff, sometimes things that make me smile, but that is Courtney Love. She is a beautiful woman, and she has her own look.” American women's lifestyle magazine Bust wrote in 2017: "Regardless of looming criticism, she always remained unabashedly herself, honoring her loud, angry, sad, slutty and sassy selves. Maybe she did take a women’s study of the abused female psyche, mix it with punk, and make it consumable for CDs and concerts. But there remained an important attempt to rise above what it is to be a girl too familiar with the dark side of depression, escapism, betrayal, tragedy, jealousy, male predators, and more."

=== Personal views ===
Love is a self-proclaimed feminist. She has criticized the far-left for being responsible for what she perceives as "in-fighting" within the feminist movement, and for accusing her for not being "feminist enough". She has also criticized mainstream media for what she perceives as the demonization of the "feminist" label. She said to Bust: "I raised my daughter as a feminist, and she won’t identify as one, because the word has been so fucking polluted by boomer media. Do I believe in feminism? Of course I do, I’m a fucking feminist. Do I believe that there are a lot of us out there? No. I really don’t." She has drawn attention to what she perceives as women in rock music being "reviled" for qualities such as rebelliousness, while male rock musicians are lauded for it. She publicly criticized the Rock and Roll Hall of Fame of practicing what she perceived to be "sexist gatekeeping" in an op-ed written for The Guardian. She told the organization to "go to hell in a handbag bro".

Love has been known for her brutal honesty when expressing subjective opinions about other female musicians such as Taylor Swift, Lana Del Rey, Beyoncé and Madonna. She said Taylor Swift's music was "not important" and "not interesting". She stated the opinion "[Swift] might be a safe space for girls, and she's probably the Madonna of now, but she's not interesting as an artist." She later said that although she was not a fan of Swift's material in the musical sense, her lyrics "resonated" with her.

== Philanthropy ==
In 1993, Love and husband Kurt Cobain performed an acoustic set together at the Rock Against Rape benefit in Los Angeles, which raised awareness and provided resources for victims of sexual abuse. In 2000, Love publicly advocated for reform of the record industry in a personal letter published by Salon. In the letter, Love said: "It's not piracy when kids swap music over the Internet using Napster or Gnutella or Freenet or iMesh or beaming their CDs into a My.MP3.com or MyPlay.com music locker. It's piracy when those guys that run those companies make side deals with the cartel lawyers and label heads so that they can be 'the label's friend', and not the artists'." In a subsequent interview with Carrie Fisher, she said that she was interested in starting a union for recording artists, and also discussed race relations in the music industry, advocating for record companies to "put money back into the black community [whom] white people have been stealing from for years."

Love has been a long-standing supporter of LGBT causes. She has frequently collaborated with Los Angeles Gay and Lesbian Center, taking part in the center's "An Evening with Women" events. The proceeds of the event help provide food and shelter for homeless youth; services for seniors; legal assistance; domestic violence services; health and mental health services, and cultural arts programs. Love participated with Linda Perry for the event in 2012, and performed alongside Aimee Mann and comedian Wanda Sykes. Speaking on her collaboration on the event, Love said: "Seven thousand kids in Los Angeles a year go out on the street, and forty percent of those kids are gay, lesbian, or transgender. They come out to their parents, and become homeless ... for whatever reason, I don't really know why, but gay men have a lot of foundations—I've played many of them—but the lesbian side of it doesn't have as much money and/or donors, so we're excited that this has grown to cover women and women's affairs."

She has also contributed to AIDS organizations, partaking in benefits for amfAR and the RED Campaign. In May 2011, she donated six of her husband Cobain's personal vinyl records for auction at Mariska Hargitay's Joyful Heart Foundation event for victims of child abuse, rape, and domestic violence. She has also supported the Sophie Lancaster Foundation as well as Stand For Courage, an anti-bullying organization started by Love's sister.

In 2021, Love and creative director and philanthropist Julie Panebianco launched From Her To Eternity, an initiative designed to collect and categorize a physical collection of related music materials that focus on and celebrate the contributions of women to popular music.

The first project of From Her to Eternity was a world-renowned female music photographers´ exhibition titled From Her to Eternity: The Women Who Photograph Music. The installation was displayed at the corner of S. Wabash Avenue and E. Eight Street in Chicago's South Loop throughout Summer 2023. The name is a tribute by Love to the late Australian singer-songwriter Anita Lane. Lane was a member of the Birthday Party and Nick Cave & The Bad Seeds who co-wrote the song "From Her To Eternity" with Nick Cave, who's an exhibition supporter alongside Anita Lane's family, Michael Stipe and artist Thomas Dozol.

== Legacy ==
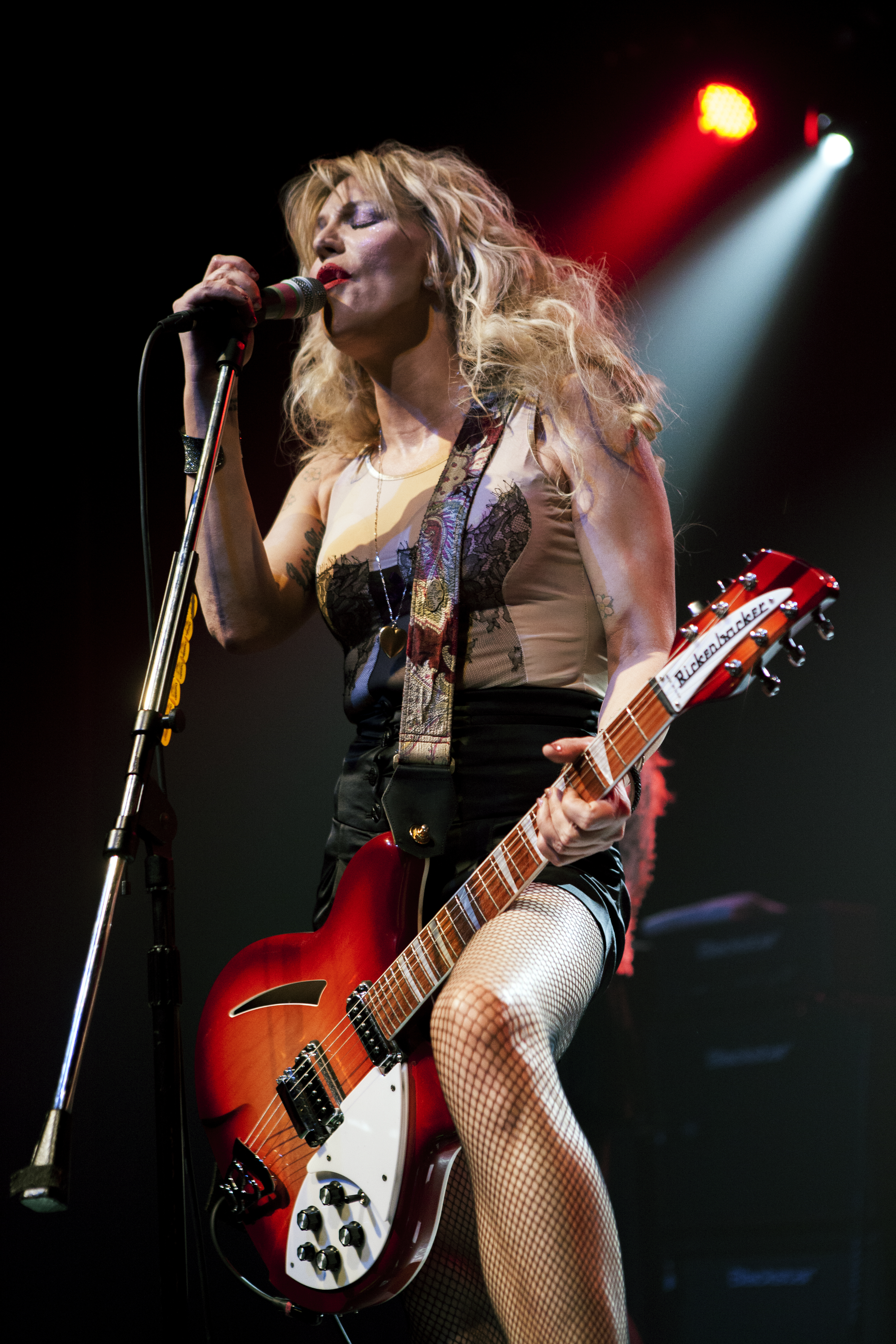
Love, pictured in 2015, with her leg supported on the monitor, recognized as one of her signature stage moves

Despite a divisive career, many publications have made note of Love's profound impact on popular culture. She has been significantly influential on female-fronted alternative acts and performers. She has been cited as influential on young female instrumentalists in particular, having once infamously proclaimed: "I want every girl in the world to pick up a guitar and start screaming ... I strap on that motherfucking guitar and you cannot fuck with me. That's my feeling." In The Electric Guitar: A History of an American Icon, it is noted:

[Love] truly lived up to Paul Westerberg's (The Replacements) assessment of pretty girls "playing makeup/wearing guitar" ... She frequently stood on stage, microphone in hand and foot on monitor, and simply let her Fender guitar dangle around her neck. She truly embodied the empowerment that came with playing the electric guitar ... Love depended heavily upon her male lead guitar foil Eric Erlandson, but the rest of her band remained exclusively female throughout several lineup changes.

When you're dying and your life is flashing before your eyes ... you're gonna be thinking about the great things you did, the horrible things that you did, the emotional impact that someone had on you and that you had on somebody else. Those are the things that are relevant. To have some sort of emotional impact that transcends time, that's great.

— Love on having a cultural impact, 1997

With over 3 million records sold in the United States alone, (Note: As of 2003, Pretty on the Inside had sold over 200,000 copies in the U.S.; Live Through This, 1,600,000; Celebrity Skin, 1,400,000 (the latter two per 2010 approximations).) Hole became one of the most successful rock bands of all time fronted by a woman. VH1 ranked Love no. 69 in their list of The 100 Greatest Women in Music History in 2012. In 2015, the Phoenix New Times declared Love the number one greatest female rock star of all time, writing: "To build a perfect rock star, there are several crucial ingredients: musical talent, physical attractiveness, tumultuous relationships, substance abuse, and public meltdowns, just to name a few. These days, Love seems to have rebounded from her epic tailspin and has leveled out in a slightly more normal manner, but there's no doubt that her life to date is the type of story people wouldn't believe in a novel or a movie." Vice wrote in 2017: "Always wild, forever unruly and stubbornly unapologetic for it, Courtney’s mere existence has proved divisive, her and Hole’s musical output often falling by the wayside in the process. But once you scrub away all the venom, what you’re left with is a string of undeniably pioneering albums. [...] You only need to look around to see the effect she’s had on pop culture over the years. [...] The world Courtney created has seeped so deeply into the blood of what we listen to, it’s easy to forget it’s even there." In 2023, Rolling Stone ranked Love at number 130 on its list of the 200 Greatest Singers of All Time.

Among the alternative musicians who have cited Love as an influence are Scout Niblett; Brody Dalle of The Distillers; Dee Dee Penny of Dum Dum Girls; Florence Welch; Annie Hardy of Giant Drag; and Sam Forrest of Nine Black Alps. Contemporary female pop artists Lana Del Rey, Avril Lavigne, Tove Lo, and Sky Ferreira have also cited Love as an influence. Love has frequently been recognized as the most high-profile contributor of feminist music during the 1990s, and for "subverting [the] mainstream expectations of how a woman should look, act, and sound." According to music journalist Maria Raha, "Hole was the highest-profile female-fronted band of the '90s to openly and directly sing about feminism." Patti Smith, a major influence of Love's, also praised her, saying: "I hate genderizing things ... [but] when I heard Hole, I was amazed to hear a girl sing like that. Janis Joplin was her own thing; she was into Big Mama Thornton and Bessie Smith. But what Courtney Love does, I'd never heard a girl do that."

She has also been a gay icon since the mid-1990s, and has jokingly referred to her fanbase as consisting of "females, gay guys, and a few advanced, evolved heterosexual men."

== Feuds ==
=== Dave Grohl ===
She has publicly feuded with Nirvana drummer Dave Grohl. In September 2001 she sued the remaining members of Nirvana, along with record labels Universal Music Group and Geffen Records in a Los Angeles Superior Court. The lawsuit was over declaratory relief and breach of contract, among other issues.

She angrily abandoned a live performance in Brazil in 2011 because an audience member had reportedly been holding up a photograph of Cobain. She said: "I’m not Kurt, I have to live with his fucking shit and his ghost and his kid every day. [...] Go see the fucking Foo Fighters and do that shit." She was reportedly topless when this incident occurred, and reportedly threatened to physically assault the concertgoer. A member of Hole's stage crew then took to the stage and incited a chant against Foo Fighters that the crowd partook in. She also stated to the audience her belief that Grohl had been stealing money that belonged to her family. She later explained that while she understood that fans did not attend her shows wearing shirts bearing Cobain's image for malicious reasons, it was nonetheless painful for her to see it. She said: "When people come to me and say, 'I love Nirvana.' I wasn't in Nirvana. However, I do own Nirvana with my daughter and because of tax laws I have to give money to his sister, Kim Cobain, and Wendy Cobain. What I was saying, is Dave makes $5 million a show, he doesn't need the money. His mother's a banker, his father's a stock broker and he's making $5 million a show. Why the fuck then does he have a Nirvana Inc. credit card, and I don't? And last week he bought an Aston Martin on it."

In April 2012, Love stated in a series of Tweets that she had heard from both the roommate of her daughter Frances Bean Cobain and from a driver that Grohl had been flirting with and had possibly had sexual intercourse with her daughter Bean, who was 19 years old at the time while the frontman was 43. In one of the Tweets, she stated the belief that Grohl was "sexually obsessed" with her late husband Kurt Cobain. Grohl's publicist said to Gawker: "Unfortunately Courtney is on another hateful twitter rant. These new accusations are upsetting, offensive and absolutely untrue." Bean said regarding the issue: "While I'm generally silent on the affairs of my biological mother, her recent tirade has taken a gross turn. I have never been approached by Dave Grohl in more than a platonic way. I'm in a monogamous relationship and very happy. Twitter should ban my mother." Love stated she did not believe Grohl's statement was factual and rejected his denial. She is quoted as follows: "Dave's a piece of shit, but he's a really good drummer. You can quote me on that." She eventually apologized to her daughter for sharing unsubstantiated claims in a Tweet: "Bean, sorry I believed the gossip.. Mommy loves you."

They ended the feud at the Rock and Roll Hall of Fame in 2014, though in 2026 Love expressed annoyance that fans would not "let it go".

=== Lynn Hirschberg ===
In 1992, Love was interviewed by Vanity Fair journalist Lynn Hirschberg in what was intended to be her first public appearance "as more than just Kurt Cobain’s wife," according to Flavorwire. The article that the interview resulted from publicly accused Love of using heroin while pregnant and questioned her fitness for motherhood. Love said to Entertainment Weekly in response: "She painted a picture of a person who has no ethics, no discipline, does heroin (during) her pregnancy. Give me a break. I mean, I went to college. I’m not insane. Lynn Hirschberg is really obsessed with me and she’s just, you know, really mainstream. She does celebrity profiles and puff pieces." Three years later, she reportedly grabbed Quentin Tarantino's Oscar trophy for Pulp Fiction and threatened to "brain" her with it when she reencountered her at the 1995 Oscars after party. Seattle Weekly reported that Hirschberg and an eyewitness said that Love drunkenly stumbled over to the table that she and Tarantino were at, and proceeded to nonchalantly talk about assaulting Hirschberg with the figurine without even recognizing her. The newspaper said that Tarantino restrained Love's arm and Hirschberg simply walked away in response.

=== Trent Reznor ===
She dated Nine Inch Nails frontman Trent Reznor in the past. They separated eventually. She wrote in 2008: "The point is Reznor got PISSED. HEY, HE STARTED IT." She said "Don’t call your band Nine Inch Nails when you have a three-inch one." She also accused him of "systemic" child abuse on Twitter, claiming to have witnessed such behavior from him personally. Reznor made no response in regard to the matter. Love removed the post the following day and publicly apologized.

=== Ted Nugent ===
In 2004, Love called into The Howard Stern Show and claimed she gave Ted Nugent oral sex at the age of 12, when he would have been 29 years of age. She said: "I didn't have breasts yet... it's sick." She called the show again in 2013 and retold the story. AOL reported that some minute details had changed, though "the basic story stayed the same." Nugent denied the allegations.

== Discography ==
=== Solo discography ===
- America's Sweetheart (2004)

=== with Hole ===
- Pretty on the Inside (1991)
- Live Through This (1994)
- Celebrity Skin (1998)
- Nobody's Daughter (2010)

== Filmography ==
- Sid and Nancy (1986)
- Straight to Hell (1987)
- The People vs. Larry Flynt (1996)
- 200 Cigarettes (1999)
- Man on the Moon (1999)
- Julie Johnson (2001)
- Trapped (2002)

== Bibliography ==
- Levy, Stu; Love, Courtney (2004). Princess Ai: Destitution. Vol. 1. Tokyopop [Japan: Shinshokan]. ISBN 978-1-59182-669-9.
- Levy, Stu; Love, Courtney (2005). Princess Ai: Lumination. Vol. 2. Tokyopop [Japan: Shinshokan]. ISBN 978-1-59182-670-5.
- Levy, Stu; Love, Courtney (2006). Princess Ai: Evolution. Vol. 3. Tokyopop [Japan: Shinshokan]. ISBN 978-1-59182-671-2.
- Love, Courtney (2006). Dirty Blonde: The Diaries of Courtney Love. Faber & Faber. ISBN 978-0-86547-959-3.
