= Heroin chic =

Drug-abuse-inspired fashion style

Kate Moss in a 1990s Calvin Klein ad

Heroin chic is a style popularized in early-1990s fashion and characterized by pale skin, dark circles underneath the eyes, emaciated features, androgyny and stringy hair—all traits associated with abuse of heroin or other drugs. American supermodel Gia Carangi is remembered for being the originator of the trend.

Heroin chic was partly a reaction against the healthy and vibrant look of leading 1980s models such as Cindy Crawford, Elle Macpherson, and Claudia Schiffer. A 1996 article in the Los Angeles Times stated that the fashion industry had "a nihilistic vision of beauty" that was reflective of drug addiction.

== Background ==
During the 1980s, the AIDS epidemic had made injecting heroin with unclean needles increasingly risky. However, the price of heroin had decreased, and its purity had increased dramatically. Available heroin had become more pure, and snorting became a more common mode of heroin use. These changes decreased the stigma surrounding the drug, allowing heroin to find a new market among the middle-class and the wealthy, in contrast to its previous base of the poor and marginalized. Gia Carangi, sometimes referred to as the "first supermodel" is remembered for being the origin of the heroin chic trend. Andy Warhol superstar Edie Sedgwick has also been retroactively described as a precursor to "heroin chic" due to her thin look and heroin use. Heroin infiltrated pop culture through attention brought to addictions in the early 1990s. In film, the heroin chic trend in fashion coincided with a string of films throughout the 1990s—such as The Basketball Diaries, Trainspotting, Kids, Permanent Midnight, and Pulp Fiction—that examined heroin use and drug culture.

=== Grunge ===
In the early 1990s, the rise of the grunge alternative rock music and subculture in Seattle brought media attention to the use of heroin by prominent grunge artists. In the 1990s, the media focused on the use of heroin by musicians in the Seattle grunge scene, with a 1992 New York Times article listing the city's "three principal drugs" as "espresso, beer and heroin" and a 1996 article calling Seattle's grunge scene the "...subculture that has most strongly embraced heroin". Tim Jonze from The Guardian states that "...heroin had blighted the [grunge] scene ever since its inception in the mid-80s" and he argues that the "...involvement of heroin mirrors the self-hating, nihilistic aspect to the music"; in addition to the heroin deaths, Jonze points out that Stone Temple Pilots' Scott Weiland, as well as Courtney Love, Mark Lanegan and Evan Dando "...all had their run-ins with the drug, but lived to tell the tale." A 2014 book stated that whereas in the 1980s, people used the "stimulant" cocaine to socialize and "...celebrate good times", in the 1990s grunge scene, the "depressant" heroin was used to "retreat" into a "cocoon" and be "...sheltered from a harsh and unforgiving world which offered...few prospects for...change or hope."

Leading grunge band Alice in Chains had a song "God Smack", which included the line "stick your arm for some real fun", a reference to injecting heroin. Seattle grunge musicians known to use heroin included Kurt Cobain, who was using the drug very frequently around the time of his death; "Andrew Wood of Mother Love Bone overdosed on heroin in 1990"; "Stefanie Sargent of 7 Year Bitch who died of an overdose of the same opiate in 1992, along with Layne Staley of Alice in Chains who publicly detailed his battles with heroin...". Mike Starr of Alice in Chains and Jonathan Melvoin from The Smashing Pumpkins also died from heroin. After Cobain's death, his "...widow, singer Courtney Love, characterized Seattle as a drug mecca, where heroin is easier to get than in San Francisco or Los Angeles."

== Rise and fall ==
This waifish, emaciated look was the basis of the 1993 advertising campaign of Calvin Klein for his perfume Obsession featuring Kate Moss. Film director and actor Vincent Gallo contributed to the development of the image through his Calvin Klein fashion shoots.

In 1995, Playboy published an article on Heroin chic, following a young and successful heroin user and its elite crew in Los Angeles, saying "Far from being anomalous, they are part of a new breed of talent that has recently infiltrated the culture factory. They are hip, motivated, educated--and on dope. They are the heroin achievers".

Perry Farrell (former lead singer Jane's Addiction) said "I think it's great" when talking about heroin in an interview. Kurt Cobain and his wife Courtney Love were notorious struggling heroin users, turning heroin use into a "dysfunctional glamour" of rock culture. The movie industry created more heroin sequences in its edgy movies (Naked Lunch, Rush, Killing Zoe, Fresh, Ed Wood). Some actors adopted the trend so fully that the line between strungout look and actual junky was blurred. Johnny Depp opened The Viper Room in front of which River Phoenix overdosed from a speedball (mix cocaine and heroin) at age 23, hinting at the substances used inside. In fashion, where heroin chic means "looking scruffy on a higher budget' a group of heroin top models called themselves 'Gia's Girls' in reference to the deceased heroin user Gia Carangi.

The trend eventually faded, in part due to the heroin-related death of prominent fashion photographer Davide Sorrenti in 1997. Journalist Amy Spindler described Sorrenti's death as "like a small bomb going off", extinguishing public denial of heroin use in the fashion world. The term heroin chic itself was coined at Sorrenti's wake by editor Ingrid Sischy, who commented: "This is heroin, this isn't chic. This has got to stop, this heroin chic." After his death, Sorrenti's mother, Francesca Sorrenti, led a public campaign against the use of heroin in fashion, after which the promotion of heroin chic subsided. In 1999, Vogue dubbed Brazilian supermodel Gisele Bündchen "The Return of the Sexy Model" and the end of the heroin chic era.

== Criticism ==
Heroin chic fashion drew much criticism and scorn, especially from anti-drug groups. Fashion designers, models such as Kate Moss and Jaime King, and movies such as Trainspotting were blamed for glamorizing heroin use. Then-U.S. president Bill Clinton condemned the look, stating that the "glorification of heroin is not creative, it's destructive. It's not beautiful. It's ugly. And this is not about art. It's about life and death. And glorifying death is not good for any society". Other commentators denied that fashion images made drug use itself more attractive. Jacob Sullum wrote in Reason magazine that "There is no reason to expect that people attracted to the look promoted by Calvin Klein and other advertisers... will also be attracted to heroin, any more than suburban teen-agers who wear baggy pants and backward caps will end up shooting people from moving cars."

In 2022, a New York Post article hypothesized the return of the Heroin Chic movement, noting that many stars seem to be getting slimmer, and underlining how the phenomenon grew on social networks through the hashtag #thinspo, banned from TikTok for promotion of anorexia. The Guardian responded by distinguishing "too-thin" fashion movements from the Heroin Chic trend, defining the latter as a negative by-product of the 1990s culture.

== See also ==
- List of chics
- Kinderwhore
- Soft grunge
- The Heroine Sheiks
- Indie sleaze
- Gamine
