= Pagan Babies (band) =

American rock band

- A promotional shot of the band. From left to right: Janis Tanaka, Kat Bjelland, Deirdre Schletter, and Courtney Love.

Background information
- Also known as: Sugar Babydoll
- Origin: Portland, Oregon, and San Francisco, California, U.S.
- Genres: Dream pop; new wave
- Years active: 1985–1986
- Past members: Courtney Love; Kat Bjelland; Janis Tanaka; Deirdre Schletter; Jennifer Finch; Suzanne Ramsey; Jane Weems

Pagan Babies was an American band formed by Kat Bjelland and Courtney Love in 1985. It was short-lived, disbanding the following year.

Love and Bjelland initially conceived the band in Portland, Oregon under the name Sugar Babydoll, and the group was joined by original members Jane Weems on drums and Suzanne Ramsey on keyboards. Later joined by bassist Jennifer Finch upon their relocation to San Francisco. The group would go through several lineup and name changes before recording a four-track demo under the Pagan Babies name with drummer Deirdre Schletter and bassist Janis Tanaka.

Two of the group's songs—"Best Sunday Dress" and "Quiet Room"—were later reworked and re-recorded by Love's band, Hole, and Bjelland's band, Babes in Toyland, respectively.

== History ==
=== Establishment as Sugar Babydoll ===
Courtney Love had originally come up with the name and idea for the band in the early 1980s when she was a teenager in Portland, (Note: It is noted in a 1995 interview in Spin that Love had formulated an early concept of the band in Portland with her friends Ursula Wehr and Robin Barbur, but that the group never actually made music. This group is referred to as Sugar Babydoll, a name that was carried over when Kat Bjelland and Jennifer Finch joined the group.) but aborted the project and moved to San Francisco in 1982 where she had a brief stint as a singer for Faith No More. Upon returning to Portland in 1983, Love met Kat Bjelland at the Satyricon nightclub. Both Love and Bjelland were frequent visitors to the rock club, known in the 1980s as a hub for punk rock shows and rock musicians.

According to Bjelland, after the two had met, Love, who was looking to form an all-female rock group, "fell to her knees" and begged "please, please be my guitarist." In June 1985, Bjelland and Love were joined by Suzanne Ramsey and drummer Jane Weems. Later, bassist Jennifer Finch would join in San Francisco, and the group went by the name Sugar Babydoll, a variation on a prior idea, Sugar Babylon. "We were going to make the most obnoxious music in the world," Love said in 1998. "However, I had a doctor who gave me a hundred sedatives a week. So we ended up making this faux Cocteau Twins music, but I didn't really have the voice, and I was singing in a register that was way too high for me."

Bjelland recalled her time in the band in a 1994 interview, commenting: "I'd quit the Venarays by this time and me and Courtney were trying to get a band together. We needed a bass player, so when we found Jennifer we formed Sugar Babydoll, Sugar Babylon, Sugar Bunny Farm or whatever it was called. We went through a few names, and we only played a couple of shows. It was the smallest thing I've ever done musically."

=== Renaming and demo ===
After the departure of bassist Finch, Bjelland and Love recruited Janis Tanaka to play bass, and through Tanaka found a drummer/pianist, Deirdre Schletter. The band soon began rehearsing in friends' bedrooms, and played numerous covers and some originals during their jam sessions. During this time, the group went by the name Pagan Babies.

Love and Bjelland's shared apartment in San Francisco became the Pagan Babies' rehearsal space. It was here that they recorded a demo tape in December 1985. Aside from the band's four main songs, "I See Nothing," "Colder than Me," "My Angels" and "All Roads Lead To" were also written, though only may have been embryonic lyrics written by Love.

The band performed live twice before splitting up, first in a friend's bedroom, where they played electric versions of their songs, and second in a friend's living room with acoustic guitars. Both shows and rehearsals were later described as just about "getting together and screwing off". During their post-show period, Bjelland began writing songs inspired by punk band Frightwig — some of which would later become Babes in Toyland songs — a band introduced to Bjelland by Tanaka's boyfriend at the time. Love, determined to conserve the band's new wave and dream pop-inspired sound, was not impressed with the new material and subsequently, an internal feud developed within the band, leading to Love being ousted. The night Love left the band, she was noted as saying "you're never going to get anywhere playing that punk rock noise."

After Love's departure, the band disbanded and the remaining members became the short-lived Italian Whorenuns. In retrospect, Love referred to Pagan Babies as one of her "pretend bands" that never manifested.

The band recorded a demo tape on one of the member's 4-track cassette deck in December 1985 prior to their splitting up. The demo tape was rumored to have been broadcast on local radio. The tape contained four songs:

- "Cold Shoulders" (written by Love and Bjelland)
- "Bernadine" (written by Love)
- "Best Sunday Dress" (written by Love and Bjelland)
- "Quiet Room" (written by Love and Bjelland)

=== Aftermath ===
"Best Sunday Dress" would later be rearranged by Love's band, Hole, in 1998. Though performed frequently throughout the band's 1994–1995 tour dates, a studio version of the song was only recorded in 1997 and appeared as a b-side on the band's most notable single, "Celebrity Skin." A clip from the master tape of the demo would also appear on the Hole track "Starbelly," which was released on the band's debut album Pretty on the Inside in September 1991. "Quiet Room" would later be redone by Bjelland's band, Babes in Toyland, on their 1991 EP To Mother and again on the band's 1992 studio album Fontanelle. The track "Quiet Room" was inspired by Love's stay at Hillcrest school in her teen years according to her book Dirty Blonde: The Diaries of Courtney Love, where it features some old records from the school and lyrics to the song, however, the accuracy of whether Love really wrote the song is questioned due to Love's stating differently at several different times. Furthermore, the melody of "Quiet Room" resembles that of Bauhaus's "King Volcano"; Love previously admitted to copying the riff from Bauhaus's "Dark Entries" on the track "Mrs. Jones" off of Hole's Pretty on the Inside.

In 2004, the complete demo tape circulated amongst trading circles online. The songs were transferred to MP3 format from a copy of Janis Tanaka's friend's cassette. It was also rumoured in 2006 that Sympathy for the Record Industry, Hole's one-time label, were planning to release at least one song from the Pagan Babies demos in a compilation, but the idea was later dropped. However, "Quiet Room" saw release on Babes in Toyland's 2004 compilation, The Best of Babes In Toyland and Kat Bjelland.

== Members ==
- Courtney Love – lead vocals
- Kat Bjelland – lead guitar, backing vocals
- Janis Tanaka – bass
- Deirdre Schletter – drums, piano
- Jennifer Finch – bass
- Suzanne Ramsey – piano
- Jane Weems – drums

== Sources ==
- Baldwin, Michelle (2004). Burlesque and the New Bump-n-grind. Denver, Colorado: Speck Press. ISBN 978-0-9725776-2-5.
- Brite, Poppy Z. (1998). Courtney Love: The Real Story. New York City, New York: Simon & Schuster. ISBN 978-0-684-84800-6. OCLC 37392936.
- Burrows, Marc (2025). Nirvana: A Detailed Guide to the Band that Changed Everything. Barnsley, South Yorkshire, England: White Owl. ISBN 978-1-399-05343-3.
- Chambers, Selena (2023). Babes in Toyland's Fontanelle. New York City, New York: Bloomsbury. ISBN 978-1-501-37757-0.
- Evans, Liz (1994). Women, Sex and Rock'n'roll: In Their Own Words. London, England: Pandora. ISBN 978-0-04-440900-7.
- Gaar, Gillian G. (2002). She's a Rebel: The History of Women in Rock & Roll. New York City, New York: Seal Press. ISBN 978-1-58005-078-4.
- Taylor, Steve (2006). The A to X of Alternative Music. New York City, New York: Continuum. ISBN 978-0-826-48217-4.
