= Soft grunge =

Fashion trend

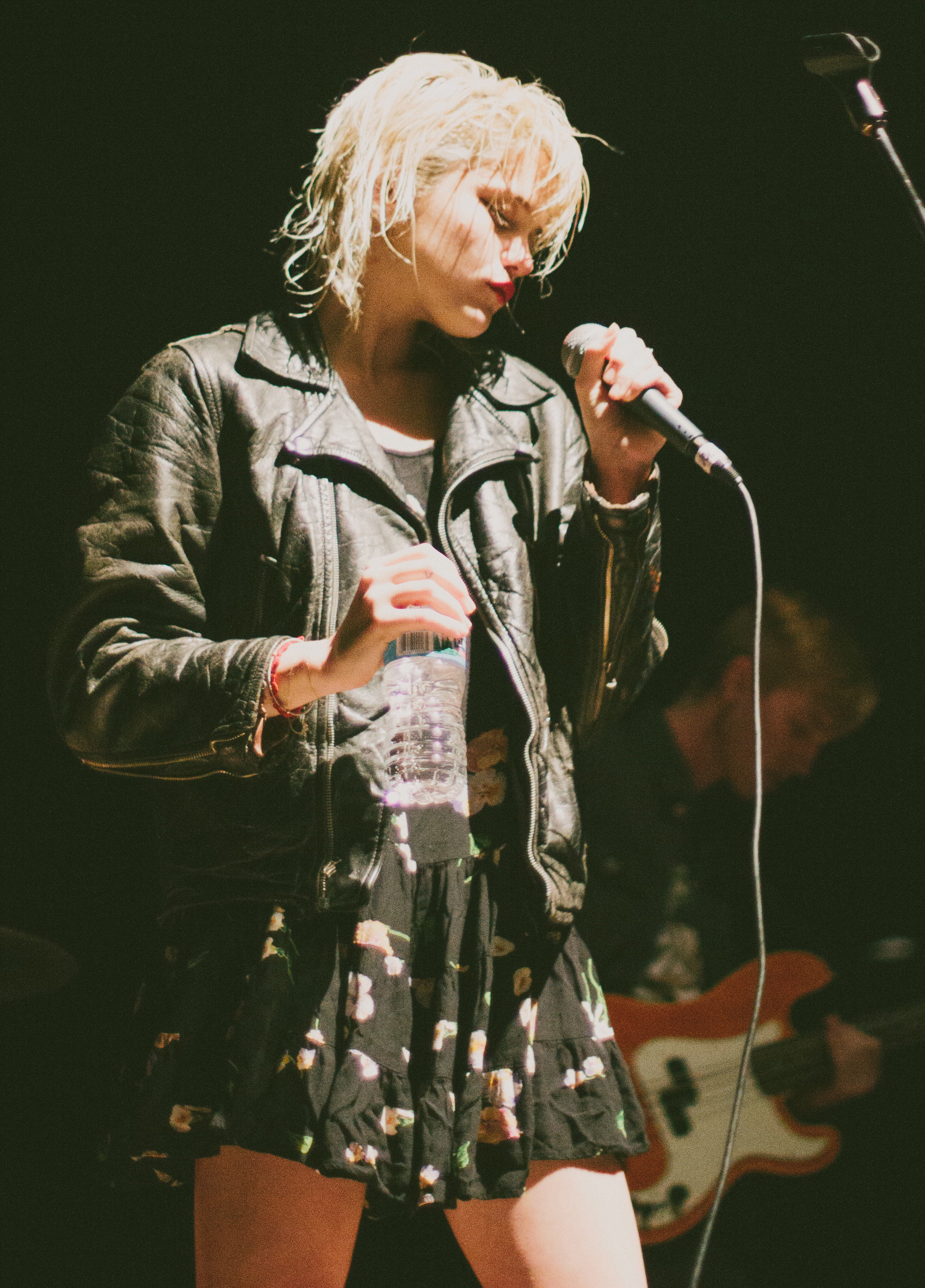
Sky Ferreira has been credited by publications including Alternative Press and i-D as popularising soft grunge fashion.

Soft grunge (or Tumblr grunge) was a fashion trend that originated on Tumblr around the late 2000s and early 2010s. Beginning as an outgrowth of the 2000s indie sleaze fashion trend but with a greater influence from the 1990s, particularly grunge fashion, the style began as a reaction against the glamor fitness culture which was dominant in popular culture at the time. It is characterized by its merger of cute and aggressive fashion hallmarks like chokers, tennis skirts, leather jackets and boots, flower crowns, distressed denim and pastel colors. Soft grunge reached its peak popularity around 2014, by which time it had been embraced by high fashion designers including Hedi Slimane and Jeremy Scott and been worn by celebrities including Charli XCX. Its internet-based merger of subculture, fashion and music made it one of the earliest examples of an Internet aesthetic. In the early 2020s, the style experienced a minor resurgence due to videos posted on the video sharing application TikTok.

== History ==
By the 2000s, indie sleaze fashion had become popular, which including traits of 1970s and 1980s fashion in addition to grunge and the contemporary hipster fashion. Soft grunge evolved directly from this trend, once Tumblr users began to merge it with darker fashion elements like fishnets, chokers and combat boots. A 2022 article published by i-D specifically cited Hope Sandoval's incorporation of baby tees, slip dresses and mesh as influential upon the development of soft grunge. Teen Vogue writer Kara K. Nesvig and Refinery29 writer Sadhbh O'Sullivan also cited emo fashion as a notable component. Early on its development, the style was deliberately confrontational to the fitness culture which was dominant in popular culture at the time, namely Victoria's Secret's Train Like an Angel campaign and online fitness influencers like Blogilates and Freelee the Bananagirl.

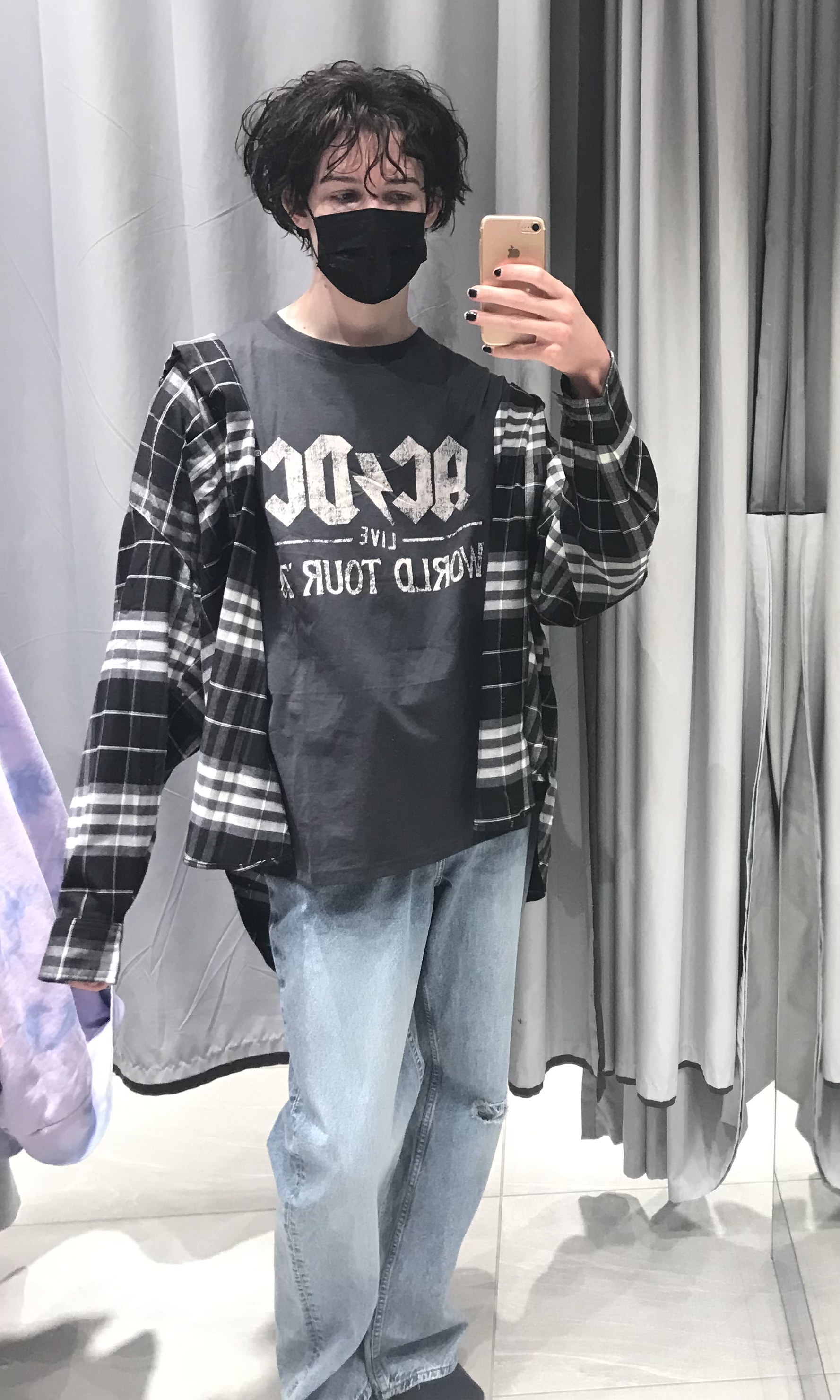
Soft grunge resurfaced in the early 2020s.

Alternative Press writer Marian Phillips cited Sky Ferreira as having "largely popularized" the style beginning in 2009. Ferreira's style was a direct outgrowth of indie sleaze, making use of chunky boots, babydoll dresses, leopard print, leather, tennis skirts, smudged makeup and grown out dark roots on bleached blonde hair. In a 2014 article for Vogue, stylist Ian Bradley called Ferreira's look "A mix of sexy, innocent and tough". Nylon specifically cited the music video for her song "Everything Is Embarrassing" (2012) as the "utmost style inspiration" on Tumblr. In the following years, musician Lana Del Rey, models Kate Moss and Kylie Jenner and actress Kaya Scodelario's portrayal of the fiction character Effy Stonem, all became points of inspiration for the emerging fashion style.

The style was soon embraced by the fashion mainstream, with Jeremy Scott using its influence for his fall 2012 collection for luxury fashion house Moschino, and in 2013 Ferreira becoming Hedi Slimane's muse when he took over as the creative director for luxury fashion house Yves Saint Laurent. Following the release of her 2013 debut album True Romance, Charli XCX emerged as an influence on the style, appearing at the NME Awards in a soft grunge that included tartan mini skirt, fishnets, crop top and smudged makeup. By 2015, "grunge" was Tumblr's most reblogged fashion term, with soft grunge and pale grunge both appearing in the top 20.i-D magazine called the style one of the earliest internet aesthetics which become commonplace by the 2020s. In addition to this, the website cited the style as influential on both the e-girl and VSCO girl fashion styles, which originated in the late 2010s. The style was also influential on 2020s rockstar girlfriend, ballerina sleaze and coquette trends.

Around 2022, the style began to experience a resurgence in popularity due to videos uploaded on the video sharing application TikTok, where by August of that year, the hashtags 2014Tumblr accumulated 232 million uses, GrungeAesthetic with 611 million uses and TumblrAesthetic with 46.6 million. Harper's Bazaar's writer Ella Sangster credited the revival as a reaction against the clean girl aesthetic which had been prominent on the same platform since 2020. The same year, luxury fashion house Ports 1961 launched their fall/winter 2022 campagne which featured models Vittoria Ceretti and Bella Hadid in soft grunge inspired outfits taken on polaroid cameras. During this time, the style was embraced by celebrities including Emma Chamberlain, Doja Cat and Olivia Rodrigo.

== Fashion ==
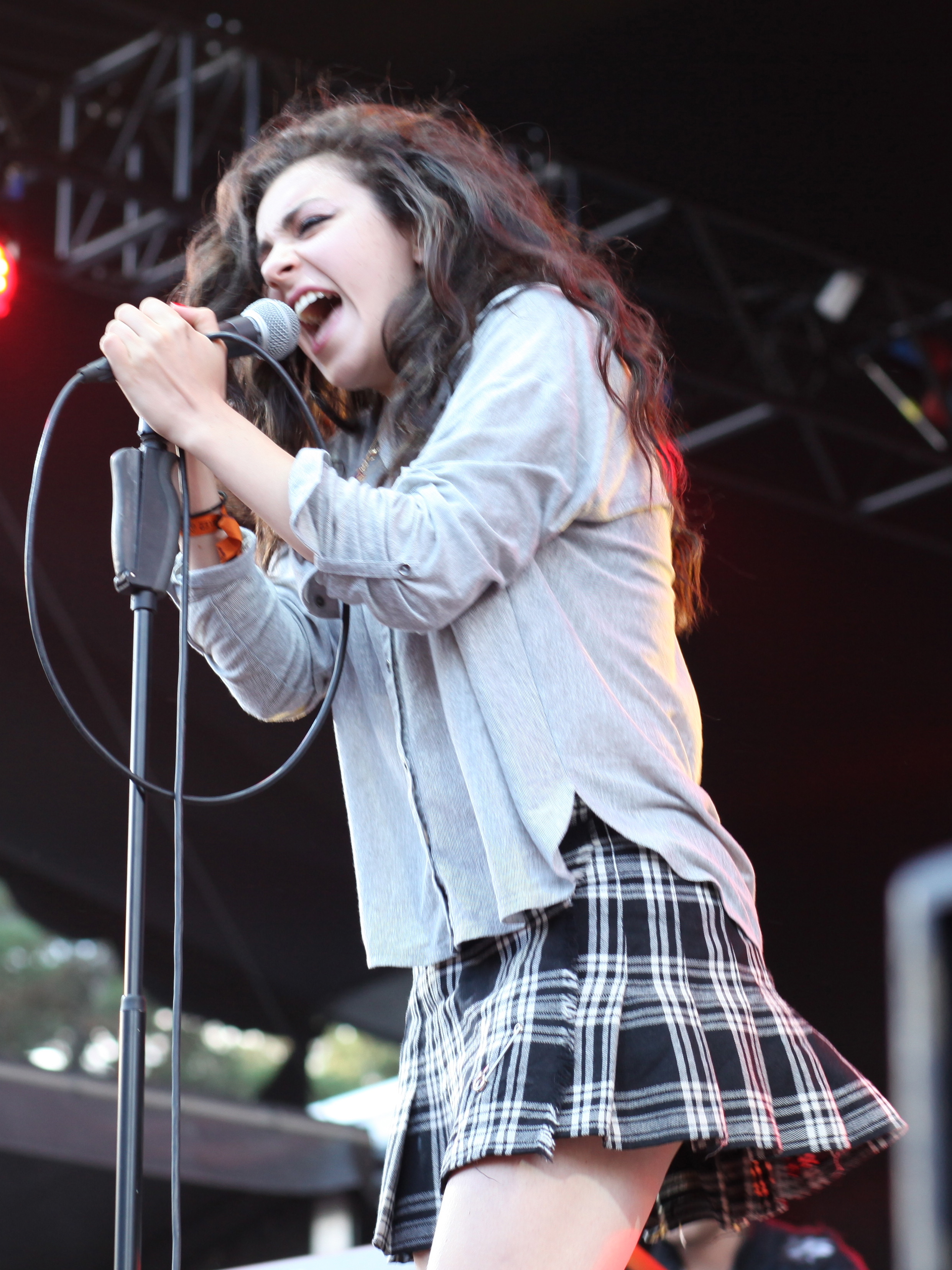
In the early 2010s, British singer-songwriter Charli XCX frequently wore the style during her concerts and performances.

Soft grunge was based upon the dominant fashion silhouette of the 2010s: high-waisted, tight-fitting trousers or pleated mini skirts with crop tops or t-shirts; while also making use of items common in the 1990s. One of the key aspects of the style is its merger of edgy and distressed "grunge" items with traditionally beautiful "soft" motifs like the colour pink, hearts and nostalgia. Racked media writer Frank Gargione called the style a take on grunge fashion but "commoditized by chain stores and available in softer, sweeter colors".

Soft grunge outfits often include: the usage of studs and spikes, Vans skate shoes, band shirts, Dr. Martens shoes and boots, tennis skirts, chokers, flannel shirts, leather jackets, enamel pins, high waisted shorts, red lipstick, flower crowns, galaxy print, matte lipstick, winged eyeliner, fishnets, knee socks, Chuck Taylor All-Stars, tote bags, denim jackets and cuffed, ripped jeans. Many of these items were specifically bought from American Apparel, with clothes from Unif and Urban Outfitters both also becoming popular once the style began gaining traction. Hair is also often dyed. It often makes use of pastel colours, particularly pinks and blues.

== Photography ==
Soft grunge photography often made use of desaturated colors or were black and white. A particularly defining part of soft grunge photography was the use of instant cameras, as well as the VSCO P5 filter. Photos were often of BLK brand water, cigarettes, tennis skirts, black boots, fishnets, and marshmallows, while also evoking melancholic moods and narratives of illness, pain, depression, unrequited love and wanting to move to somewhere else. One popular trope was photography of a forest with song lyrics superimposed on top or bedrooms decorated with fairy lights, band posters or banners.

A common compositional theme was skin, particularly bruises, wrinkles, scars and blonde vellus hairs, sometimes taken while in a bath and decorated with glitter, flowers and rainbows. In extreme circumstances these depicted self-harm and items used to do so like razor blades or shards of glass. Similarly, imagery of drug use like cigarettes, pills, lighters, alcohol and decorated cigarette packets were common. Depictions such as these were often deleted by Tumblr admins.

== Music ==
The music genre soft grunge took its name from its prominence on soft grunge Tumblr. The term was originally used disparagingly, implying the genre appealed to the site's female teen usership, was overconcered with aesthetics and downplaying its heaviness. Much of its popularity was due to its frequent use by Stuff You Will Hate. It began in the late 2000s and early 2010s, when bands involved in Pennsylvania's fourth-wave emo scene began to incorporate 1990s alternative rock influences. This included Balance and Composure, Superheaven and Title Fight.

Outside of the soft grunge genre, those who participate in online soft grunge communities often listened to Sky Ferreira, Charli XCX, the Neighbourhood, the 1975, Arctic Monkeys, Vampire Weekend, Lana Del Rey and Marina Diamandis.

== Criticism ==
Soft grunge has been criticized by publications including Jezebel, the Ringer and Vice Media as romanticizing and glorifying self-harm, eating disorders, suicidal ideation and mental illness. In her book The Aesthetics of Self-Harm, Academic Zoe Alderton stated that the specific depictions of self-harm on soft grunge blogs conformed to what Ping-Nie Pao described as "delicate self-mutilation". Pao observed in his 1969 study of self-harmers that many made effeminate "superficial, delicate, carefully designed incisions".

Highsnobiety writer Nico Amarco brought into question the style's links to grunge stating that "While the idolatry of original grunge and alt rock is commonplace in the soft grunge community, knowledge and genuine interest in any of these bands is thin on the ground", with Tumblr users instead generally championing the alternative pop music of 2010s artists like Sky Ferreira, Lana Del Rey and Charli XCX.

== See also ==
- Kinderwhore
- Post-grunge
- Heroin chic
