= Peter Pan collar =

Flat clothing collar

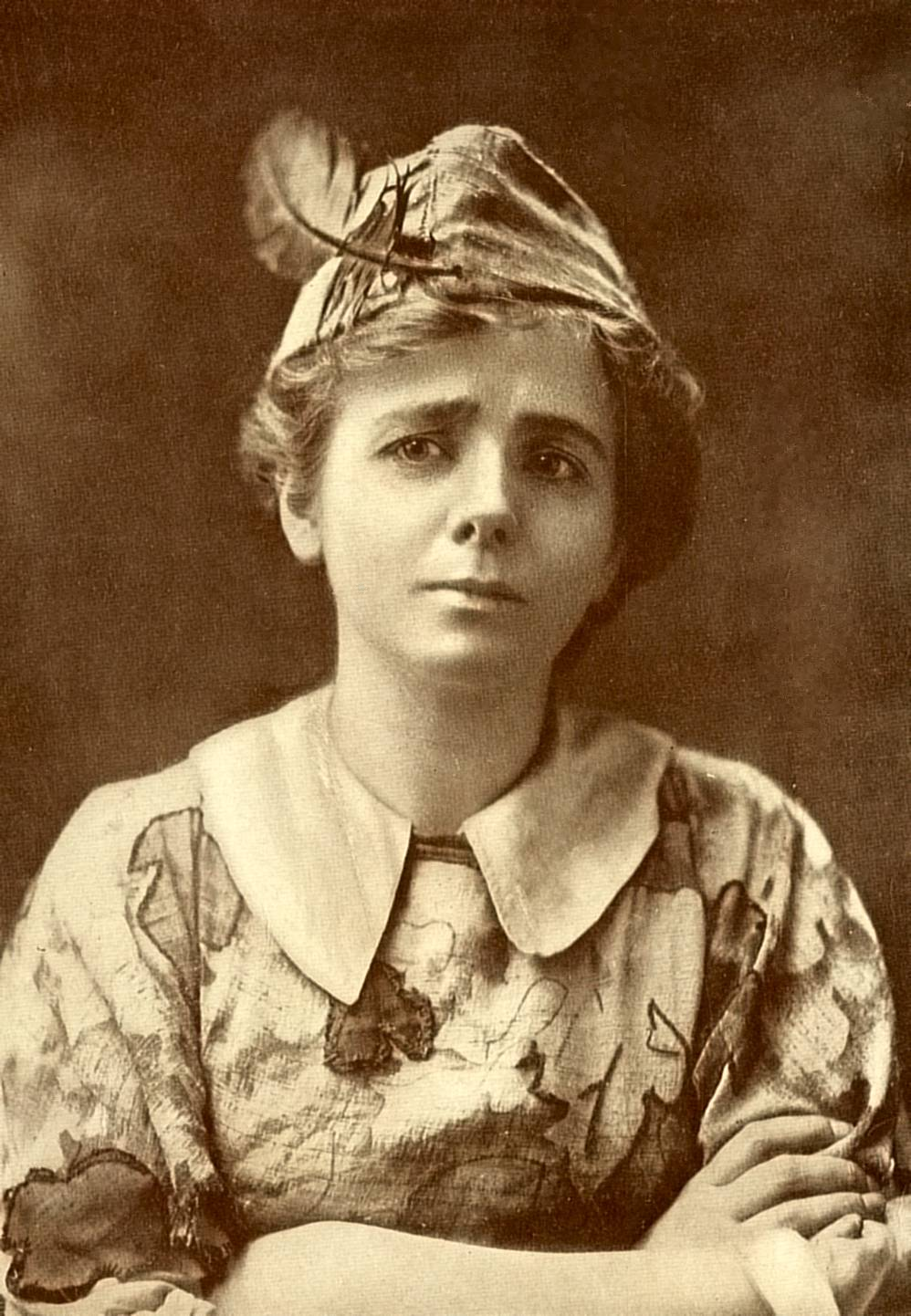
Maude Adams as Peter Pan, wearing the eponymous collar.

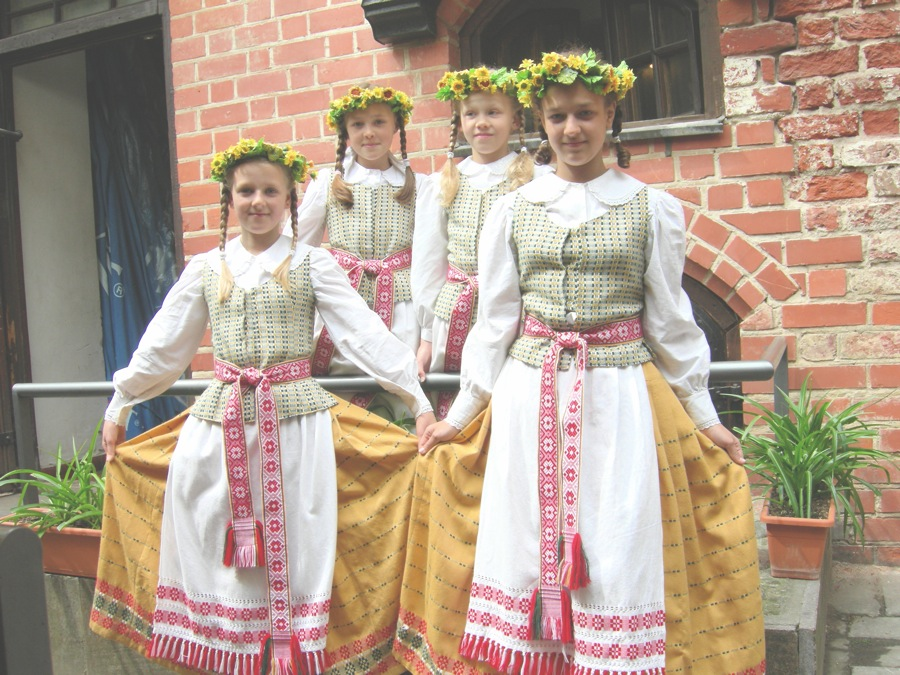
Traditional Lithuanian dress with Peter Pan collars.

A Peter Pan collar is a style of clothing collar, flat in design with rounded corners. It is named after the collar of Maude Adams's costume in her 1905 role as Peter Pan, although similar styles had been worn before this date.

== Style ==
The Peter Pan collar is a form of flat collar, one of the three basic collar types along with stand and roll collars. It is cut to fit around the neckline, following the curve, and to lie flat upon the torso. It can be made either as one part, with a front-fastening bodice, or in two parts to accommodate a back fastening while retaining the front opening. The collar is small and soft, with rounded corners.

Although regularly part of women's fashion since the 1900s, including a popular wedding dress detail in the mid-20th century, the collar has been mainly associated with children's wear since the 1920s.

== Origins ==
The collar that gave the style its name was designed by John White Alexander and his wife in collaboration with Maude Adams for the 1905 production of Peter and Wendy in New York. Neither J. M. Barrie's book or play (which described Peter as wearing cobwebs and leaves), nor the original 1904 London production starring Nina Boucicault (in a cape), had featured a similar design. Even though subsequent Peter Pans did not wear the collar, Adams's collar proved a fashion success in the United States and United Kingdom and retained its association with her role.

The Peter Pan collar has similarities to a number of earlier designs, particularly the col Claudine or Claudine collar from Paris, a round collar worn with a check scarf. The Claudine collar was named after the title character of Colette's 1900 novel Claudine à l'école, who was described as wearing it. Claudine inspired a range of accessories bearing her name, including the claudinet, a "round collar" for women and children and perfumes.

Other parallels, also named after fictional characters, have been drawn to the collars associated with Little Lord Fauntleroy introduced in 1885 and Buster Brown in 1902, both of which inspired young boys' outfits based on their look.
