= 1995 Academy Awards =

1995 Academy Awards may refer to:

- 67th Academy Awards, the Academy Awards ceremony that took place in 1995
- 68th Academy Awards, the 1996 ceremony honoring the best in film for 1995

== See also ==
- Oscars 95, the 95th Academy Awards held in 2023 for the 2022 year in film
