= Dirty Blonde: The Diaries of Courtney Love =

2006 memoir by Courtney Love

- Author: Courtney Love
- Cover artist: Headcase Design (photo by Kurt Cobain)
- Language: English
- Genre: Diary
- Publisher: Faber & Faber
- Publication date: 2006
- Publication place: United States
- Media type: Print (Hardback & Paperback)

Dirty Blonde: The Diaries of Courtney Love is a memoir by American rock musician and actress Courtney Love, published by Faber & Faber in October 2006. It contains journal entries, letters, poetry, handwritten song lyrics, artwork, collages, school and juvenile hall entries, show fliers, photographs and notes.

== Content ==
Dirty Blonde includes a suicide-note-like apology letter addressed to Love's deceased husband Kurt Cobain and her daughter Frances Bean written on a Sunset Marquis Hotel letterhead: "I love you. Please forgive me. ... You are both too beautiful for me. I love you forever". It also includes a bitter note, realizing that she is "a public figure unhappy with my share of the American dream. There can only be one reason for this. I am on drugs, and have the morals and mentality of a cartoon character. What did I want after all??", and a 1976 rejection letter from The New Mickey Mouse Club for "Coco Rodriguez", a name she adopted while living with stepfather Frank Rodriguez. The show was looking for "youngsters who have exceptional singing, dancing, or musical ability, with a marked degree of performance experience," and, as a consolation prize for not qualifying, a picture of Mickey Mouse was sent to her.

There are also a 1979 report from Hillcrest School which documents Love as screaming and swearing about bugs ("Refused to be reasonable, [...] She became louder and more insistent"), and text about Cobain's suicide. On April 17, 1994, Love wrote: ("Exactly one month ago today was the last time I made love with my husband. I cooked him dinner. We spent four hours in the playroom with Frances. We saw 'Schindler's List.' It made us frightened for life and we saw the value of life. Our convictions we defined until 4 a.m. and we fell asleep in each other's arms and woke up that way in the morning"), plus one note saying that Cobain's 1994 overdose in Rome was a "huge cover-up".

The material contains an e-mail exchange with Lindsay Lohan about negative press coverage, comments about the JT LeRoy's hoax (she exchanged e-mails with "him" for years), lyrics of songs that would figure on her forthcoming album, Nobody's Daughter, and photos from the recording sessions. In a pre-release interview, Love declared that, on the book, she "scrubbed clean the mud and rags of 2000-01-02-03-04 & 05. Five years of hell. Everything runs in seven-year cycles. Well I'm definitely out of my darkness now." The memoir contains a foreword by Carrie Fisher and afterwords by Manifesta's Jennifer Baumgardner and Amy Richards.

In 2019, Love moved to London to focus on writing a new book.
