= Maria Raha =

American journalist

- Born: 1972 (age 53–54)
- Education: Ithaca College
- Occupations: Author; journalist

Maria Raha (born 1972) is an American author and rock journalist from New York. She graduated from Ithaca College.

Much of her writing has focused on the American rock underground. Her work has appeared in music publications such as Vibe, Spin, and Bitch.

She also contributed to the anthology Young Wives' Tales: New Adventures in Love and Partnership with the short story "Pillow Talk" (2001), and The W Effect: Bush's War on Women (Feminist Press, 2004). Feminist Collections: a Quarterly of Women's Studies Resources referred to "Pillow Talk," Raha's contribution to Young Wives' Tales, as "exceptional for its prose poetry describing relationships after a rape."

In 2005, she released the book Cinderella's Big Score: Women of the Punk and Indie Underground. The book was published by Seal Press. ROCKRGRL referred to Cinderella's Big Score as a "critique of sexism within underground culture" which reads "like a warts-and-all love letter to the indie and punk communities, celebrating the women who molded them."

Raha was managing editor of Swingset, an art and music journal based in New York City. She currently lives in Philadelphia, Pennsylvania. As of 2022, she was collaborating on Dumbline, a podcast profiling the poor decisions criminals have made that led to their downfall.
