= The First Session =

1997 EP by Hole

EP by Hole
- Released: August 26, 1997
- Recorded: March 17, 1990
- Studio: Rudy's Rising Star (Los Angeles)
- Genre: Alternative rock, noise rock
- Length: 12:55
- Label: Sympathy for the Record Industry
- Producer: James Moreland, Eric Erlandson

Hole chronology
Ask for It (1995)	The First Session (1997)	My Body, the Hand Grenade (1997)

The First Session is an EP by American alternative rock band Hole, released on August 26, 1997, on Sympathy for the Record Industry. The EP features the entire recording of the band's first studio session on March 17, 1990, and also a twenty-page booklet focusing on the band's early career prior to the release of their debut studio album, Pretty on the Inside (1991). The EP marked Hole's final release on Sympathy for the Record Industry.

== Background ==
Hole formed in mid-1989 after lead guitarist Eric Erlandson replied to an advertisement, placed by frontwoman Courtney Love, in the Los Angeles-based punk rock fanzine The Recycler. The band's first rehearsal took place in Fortress Studios in Hollywood, where Love, Erlandson and original bassist Lisa Roberts "played something noisy" while "they [Courtney and Lisa] started screaming their poetry at the top of their lungs for two or three hours." Drummer Caroline Rue and a third guitarist, Mike Geisbrecht were then recruited and the band began performing shows in October 1989. Songs that would be later featured on The First Session were played at these series of live shows. Before Hole began to develop a fanbase, Geisbrecht left and his position was not replaced. Roberts also left the group at some point in early 1990 and was replaced by Jill Emery on bass.

== Recording ==
In March 1990, Hole were given a budget of $500 by Sympathy for the Record Industry's president Long Gone John for a studio recording session, which was initially meant to include only "Retard Girl." The allocated studio was known as Rudy's Rising Star, which Hole later described as "a tiny LA basement studio," and the recording session took place on March 17, 1990.

"Turpentine" was recorded first, followed by "Phonebill Song" and "Retard Girl." The final song, "Johnnie's in the Bathroom," was an avant garde-inspired noise jam and included segments of recorded phonecalls. Love's then-husband, "Falling" James Moreland, recorded and produced the session and Erlandson also took part in the production process. The final recordings were mastered by John Vestman. Moreland, despite mixed reports, would not produce Hole's next session at Radio Tokyo in November 1990, which featured "Dicknail" and "Burn Black."

The following month, in April 1990, Sympathy for the Record Industry took three songs from the session and officially released them as Hole's debut single, "Retard Girl." This release omitted "Turpentine."

== Packaging ==
The album's cover artwork features a black and white photograph of the band in 1990, taken by photographer Vicki Berndt, and an early Hole logo in pink text. Another Berndt photograph is featured on the first page of the EP's twenty-page booklet and was used by Sympathy for the Record Industry as an official promotional photograph a year later around the time of the release of Hole's debut studio album, Pretty on the Inside (1991). The booklet focuses strictly on Hole's early career and includes a full transcript of one of the band's first interviews for Flipside (issue 68) in September–October 1990, accompanying photographs by Al Flipside, the cover of the "Retard Girl" single, flyers and posters for some of Hole's early shows and various text written by Courtney Love, including a quote of Proverbs 9:13 from The Bible. On the final credits page of the booklet, Hole gives special thanks to "Miss K. Sugarheart Belljar" (Kat Bjelland of Babes in Toyland, who features on the cover of the "Retard Girl" single) labelmate Mia Ferraro of the band Spoons and a member of staff at Olympia's Evergreen State College.

According to Broadcast Music Incorporated's official web site, the songwriting credits on The First Session are mistaken. Although all the songs are listed as being written collectively written by Hole, Love wrote and composed "Retard Girl" solely by herself and the rest of the songs were written by both her and Erlandson.

== Release ==
Professional ratings
Review scores
Source	Rating
Allmusic	2.5/5 stars

The First Session was released as Hole's second EP, following Ask for It (1995), on August 26, 1997, and was only issued in the United States. The release almost identically coincided with the release of the band's first compilation album, My Body, the Hand Grenade, released a month later on City Slang. Three songs from The First Session later appeared on My Body, the Hand Grenade and "Johnnie's in the Bathroom" was omitted. Both albums were released during Hole's reported hiatus, due in part to Love's acting career, and during the transitional period between Live Through This (1994) and Celebrity Skin (1998).

Upon its release, the EP failed to attract much critical or commercial reception. Jason Akeny of Allmusic rated the album two and a half out of five stars, calling it "the same abrasive, barbed-wire juvenilia it's always been" and but praises "Eric Erlandson's lumpy, lurching guitar", "Courtney Love's ear-splitting screech" that "does achieve some kind of catharsis" and refers to "Johnnie's in the Bathroom" as "The Patti Smith homage."

== Track listing ==
No.	Title	Writer(s)	Length
1.	"Retard Girl"	Courtney Love	4:47
2.	"Phonebill Song"	Love, Erlandson	1:48
3.	"Turpentine" (previously unreleased)	Love, Erlandson	4:07
4.	"Johnnie's in the Bathroom"	Love, Erlandson	2:17
Total length:			12:55

== Personnel ==
Adapted from the album's liner notes.

Hole

- Courtney Love – vocals, guitar
- Eric Erlandson – guitar
- Jill Emery – bass
- Caroline Rue – drums

Technical

- James Moreland – producer, engineer
- Eric Erlandson – assistant producer
- John Vestman – mastering

Design

- Vicki Berndt – photography
- Al Flipside – photography

== See also ==
- "Retard Girl"
- My Body, the Hand Grenade
