= Talk to Your Daughter =

Studio album by Robben Ford
- Released: 1988
- Recorded: 1988
- Studios: Sounder (Granada Hills, California); Take One (Burbank, California); The Complex and Mad Hatter (Los Angeles, California); Record One (Sherman Oaks, California); Smoketree Ranch (Chatsworth, California); Ocean Way (Hollywood, California); One on One (North Hollywood, California); Quad Recording (New York City, New York)
- Genre: Blues rock
- Length: 41:53
- Label: Warner Bros.
- Producers: Scott Ferguson; Robben Ford

Robben Ford chronology
The Inside Story (1979)	Talk to Your Daughter (1988)	Minor Elegance with Joe Diorio (1989)

Talk to Your Daughter is a blues rock album by the American musician Robben Ford, released in 1988. The cover version of Albert King's "Born Under a Bad Sign" was used on the soundtrack to the Clint Eastwood movie Pink Cadillac.

== Critical reception ==
Professional ratings
Review scores
Source	Rating
AllMusic	4/5 stars
The Penguin Guide to Blues Recordings	2/4 stars
Windsor Star	A

The Windsor Star wrote that the album "is one of the most challenging, enjoyable new releases of 1988... Talk to Your Daughter combines some traditional blues elements, as in 'Born Under a Bad Sign' and the marvellous title tune, with more adventurous things, like 'Help the Poor', to create an aural tapestry of bluesy music that is played with intensity and a strong sense of balance."

== Track listing ==
1. "Talk to Your Daughter" (J. B. Lenoir) – 4:06
2. "Wild About You (Can't Hold Out Much Longer)" (Walter Jacobs) – 3:46
3. "Help the Poor" (Charles Singleton) – 5:37
4. "Ain't Got Nothin' but the Blues" (Duke Ellington, Larry Fotine, Don George) – 4:34
5. "Born Under a Bad Sign" (William Bell, Booker T. Jones) – 3:45
6. "I Got Over It" (Ike Turner) – 3:22
7. "Revelation" (Russell Ferrante, Lorraine Perry) – 6:21
8. "Getaway" (Robben Ford) – 4:17
9. "Can't Let Her Go" (Ford) – 5:36

== Charts ==
Chart (1988)	Peak position
Australian (Kent Music Report)	62

== Personnel ==
Musicians

- Robben Ford – lead vocals, guitars
- Russell Ferrante – acoustic piano, Yamaha GS-1, synthesizers
- Brian Mann – synthesizers (3)
- Bill Payne – additional synthesizers (9)
- Roscoe Beck – 4-string bass, 6-string bass, vocals
- Vinnie Colaiuta – drums (1–5, 7–9)
- Jeff Porcaro – drums (6)
- Brandon Fields – saxophones (2)
- Vince Denham – saxophones (6)
- Mark Ford – harmonica (6, 9)

Production

- Ted Templeman – executive producer
- Scott Ferguson – producer
- Robben Ford – producer, arrangements
- Duncan Aldridge – overdub engineer
- Mark Creamer – overdub engineer, tracking engineer, mixing (1, 4)
- Jeff Hendrickson – overdub engineer, mixing (2, 5, 6, 8, 9)
- David Hentschel – overdub engineer, tracking engineer (8, 9)
- Shep Lonsdale – overdub engineer, tracking engineer (6)
- Hal Sacks – overdub engineer
- Rick Slater – overdub engineer
- John Slattery – overdub engineer
- Geoff Gillette – mixing (3)
- Toby Wright – mix assistant (2, 5, 6, 8, 9), mixing (7)
- Bob Fuojinski – assistant engineer
- Bob Levy – assistant engineer
- Larry Mah – assistant engineer
- Micajah Ryan – assistant engineer
- Brett Swain – assistant engineer
- Howie Weinberg – mastering at Masterdisk (New York, NY)
- Joan Parker – production coordinator
- Mike Russ – dust sleeve photography
- Timothy White – front and back cover photography
