= Garbadge Man =

Song by Hole

from the album Pretty on the Inside
- Released: September 17, 1991
- Recorded: March 1991 at Music Box Studios in Los Angeles, California
- Genre: Alternative rock, noise rock
- Length: 3:32
- Label: Caroline
- Songwriter(s): Eric Erlandson, Courtney Love, Jill Emery, Caroline Rue
- Producer(s): Kim Gordon, Don Fleming

"Garbadge Man" is a song by the American alternative rock band Hole, written collectively by the band's original line-up. It is the third track on the band's first studio album, Pretty on the Inside, released on September 17, 1991, by Caroline Records. Dealing with religious and personal issues, "Garbadge Man" was Hole's first song to have a music video, which was broadcast on 120 Minutes on MTV several times in the early 1990s.

The song’s title, with a seemingly-misplaced "d," is intentionally misspelled. A Melody Maker review on Hole's live performance at Club Lingerie in Hollywood, California, on May 23, 1991, written by Everett True, a friend of the co-writers Courtney Love and Eric Erlandson, clearly stated the grammatical error and the original register at BMI for copyright collect also has the "d" in "Garbadge".

== Origin and recording ==
"Garbadge Man" is known to have been written before July 1990, as Hole performed an embryonic version of the song at a live performance at Raji's in Hollywood on July 26, 1990, as part of an eight-song set. Diary entries from 1990, featured in Dirty Blonde: The Diaries of Courtney Love (2006), also reveal that the song was originally known as simply "Garbadge".

The first and only known studio recording of the song was made in March 1991 at Music Box Studios in Los Angeles, as part of the sessions for Pretty on the Inside (1991). The song was produced and engineered by Kim Gordon of Sonic Youth and Don Fleming of Gumball and mixed by the regular Hole engineer Brian Foxworthy. It was eventually featured as the third track on the album, which saw worldwide release in September 1991.

== Composition and lyrics ==
The song is one of the more structured compositions on Pretty on the Inside, with both its lyrics and music following a more standard verse-chorus-verse formula. The music was composed by the lead guitarist Eric Erlandson, the bass guitarist Jill Emery and the drummer Caroline Rue with additions by Love, who focused primarily on lyrics. The musical content is heavily influenced by no wave and punk rock and resembles noise rock similar to Sonic Youth, with whom the album's sound was largely compared, due to the overuse of feedback and distorted guitars. Unlike other songs on the album, "Garbadge Man" was written in standard tuning. The verses are composed of four barre chords (D5-E5-C5-G5) and one major chord (E) and use two distinctive guitar techniques: sliding and string muting. The song's chorus is repetitive, rearranging three of the five verse chords, and focusing largely on sliding.

The lyrics, written solely by Love, narrate themes common in Hole songs from this period and also use vast amounts of religious imagery, similar to that in "Turpentine". The first verse explores religious decay and the chorus questions conventional religious ideals as well as lashing out at an unnamed person in the narrator's life. The end of the song references Love's feelings toward those around her, saying that every one of them "looks the same" and "feels the same". This theme of conformity was found in several songs on the band's second album, Live Through This (1994).

== Music video ==
"Garbadge Man" was Hole's first song to receive a music video, and the only video recorded for Pretty on the Inside, even though it was not released as a single. Directed by an Kevin Kerslake, the video is extremely abstract, with no definitive visual characteristics other than major use of contrast and light. Some fans have interpreted this concept as a reflection of Hole's no wave influence at the time. Shots of Love and Rue asleep and drawing artwork in a trembling car are interspersed with shots of the band playing on a stage outside the car window. According to Love, she obtained original rolls of radiographic medical film from Denver, Colorado that had been used in the Vietnam War, which the music video was then shot on, giving many of the images an X-ray-like appearance.

The video was broadcast three times on MTV; in 1992 during an interview with Love and Gordon, again in 1994, and in 1995 as part of 120 Minutes. However, it was never as popular as their later videos for Live Through This (1994) and Celebrity Skin (1998).

For the music video, a different studio mix of the song was used. This mix, reputedly done solely by Gordon, diverged significantly from the final version featured on Pretty on the Inside. In order to be broadcast, the mix censored the profanity in the song, down-tuned the song one-half step, and shortened the song by removing most of the feedback-laden coda. There were also several minor changes in phrasing, especially evident in the last verse.

There is also a second version of the video with another slightly different mix of the song that removes the profanity but sounds closer to the album mix. Similarities include no vocal doubles on the chorus and a guitar sound that has less bass.

== Personnel ==
Musicians

- Courtney Love - vocals, guitar
- Eric Erlandson - guitar
- Jill Emery - Bass guitar
- Caroline Rue - drums, percussion

Technical personnel

- Kim Gordon - producer, engineer
- Don Fleming - producer, engineer
- Brian Foxworthy - engineer, mixing
