= Michael James (producer) =

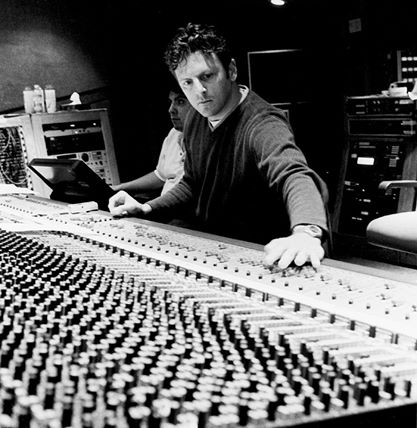
- Michael James mixing an album at Westlake Audio in 1999.

Background information
- Birth name: Michael James Marchesano
- Also known as: Michael James
- Born: February 1, 1962 (age 63); Long Island, New York City
- Genres: rock, pop, punk rock, hard rock, jazz, singer-songwriter
- Occupation(s): Record producer, mixing engineer
- Instrument(s): Electric guitar, keyboard
- Years active: 1981–present
- Labels: Warner Music Discovery Alternator Records
- Website: www.michaeljamesproducer.com

Michael James (born Michael James Marchesano; February 1, 1962) is an American record producer, mixing engineer, guitarist, and former A&R executive. James has produced and/or mixed albums for New Radicals, Too Much Joy, Hole, L7, Maia Sharp, and A.J. Croce, among others.

== Early life ==
After college, James turned his attention back to music, working as an engineer at Radio Tokyo Studios in the 1980s and becoming the studio's chief engineer by 1990.

== Mainstream success ==
James got his first big break producing Too Much Joy's second album "Son of Sam I Am," the first release on Irving Azoff's newly formed Giant Records. The following year, James produced and engineered L7's second album, "Smell the Magic", released on the Sub Pop label. This led to a relationship with Sub Pop, for whom James would later produce and engineer Hole's second single, "Dicknail" and The Reverend Horton Heat's "Speed Demon." James' successful early production work led to a brief side career as head of A&R for Warner Music Discovery. When Discovery was folded into Warner Music Group, James further diversified his musical endeavors, creating the independent record label Alternator Records. He also continued mixing and producing records, amassing more than 100 credits in the period between 1994 and 1997. In 1998, James engineered and mixed the RIAA platinum certified debut album by New Radicals, "Maybe You've Been Brainwashed Too", on which he also played electric guitar. James' involvement in the industry continued at a fast pace, including production and writing credits on A.J. Croce's 2000 album "Transit" and Maia Sharp's eponymous 2002 album.

== Recent work ==
In 2009, James founded IndieProMix with Rob Chiarelli, which offers mixing services with engineers including James as well as David Kahne (Paul McCartney, Stevie Nicks, The Strokes), Matt Forger (Michael Jackson), Tony Shepperd (Madonna, Whitney Houston, Take 6) and Nick Page (B. B. King, Fuel, Pete Yorn). James currently mixes and/or produces more than 250 songs a year, many for independent musicians, including Edwin McCain's "Mercy Bound," and Far's final album before disbanding, "At Night We Live", among others. Most recently the hit single "Wild & Free" by Australian rock band Black Whiskey. James' mix of Kalimba's single "Estrellas Rotas" spent seven consecutive weeks at Number 1 on the Monitor Latino’s Plays and Audience Reach charts during the summer of 2015.

== Personal life ==
James' most prominent hobby is bicycle racing, and in 2002, at the age of 40, he was a member of the Mercury Cycling team. James has also been featured as a guest writer for Billboard magazine, writing articles warning of potential changes due to a lack of innovation in A&R and the music industry long before digital downloads and file sharing caused a sharp decline in record sales in the 21st century. In 1991, he married Irina Irvine, a former actress turned microbial ecologist. He is an adherent of the Baháʼí Faith.

== Selected discography ==
- Phunk Junkeez – What's The Time remix – Mixing
- Black Whiskey – Wild & Free – Producer, Mixing
