= Robben Ford =

American guitarist (born 1951)

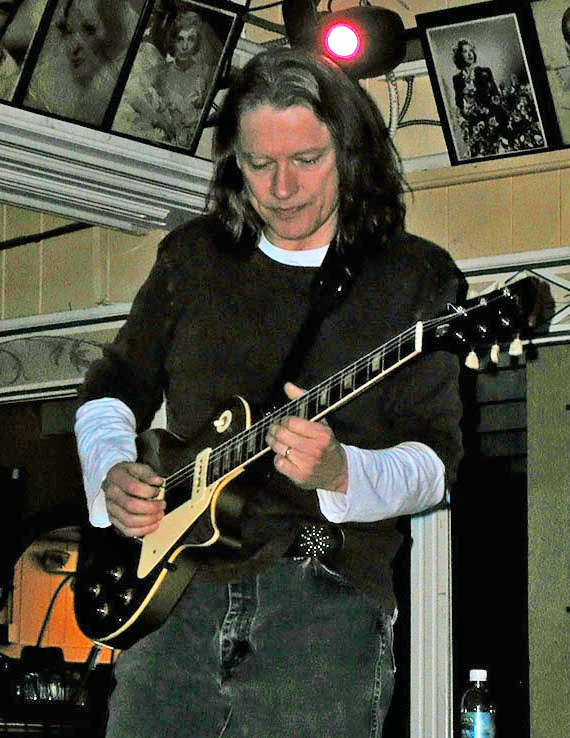
- Ford in February 2007

Background information
- Born: Robben Lee Ford; December 16, 1951 (age 74); Woodlake, California, U.S.
- Genres: Blues; jazz; fusion; rock
- Occupation: Guitarist
- Instrument: Various different Electric guitars
- Years active: 1969–present
- Website: robbenford.com

Robben Lee Ford (born December 16, 1951) is an American guitarist who performs blues, jazz, and rock. He was a member of the L.A. Express and Yellowjackets and has collaborated with Miles Davis, Joni Mitchell, George Harrison, Larry Carlton, Rick Springfield, Little Feat, Jimmy Witherspoon, and Kiss. He was named one of the "100 Greatest Guitarists of the 20th Century" by Musician magazine.

== Early life ==
Robben Ford was born in Woodlake, California, and raised in Ukiah, California. He began playing the saxophone at age 10 and the guitar at age 14. Robben and two of his brothers (Patrick and Mark) created the Charles Ford Blues Band in honor of and named after their father. A fourth brother died in the Vietnam conflict.

== Career ==
At age 18, Ford's band was hired to play with Charlie Musselwhite, and recorded two albums The Charles Ford Band and Discovering the Blues. He recorded two albums with Jimmy Witherspoon called Live and Spoonful. In the 1970s, Ford joined the jazz fusion band L.A. Express, led by saxophonist Tom Scott. In 1974, the band supported George Harrison on his American tour and played on the Joni Mitchell albums The Hissing of Summer Lawns and Miles of Aisles.

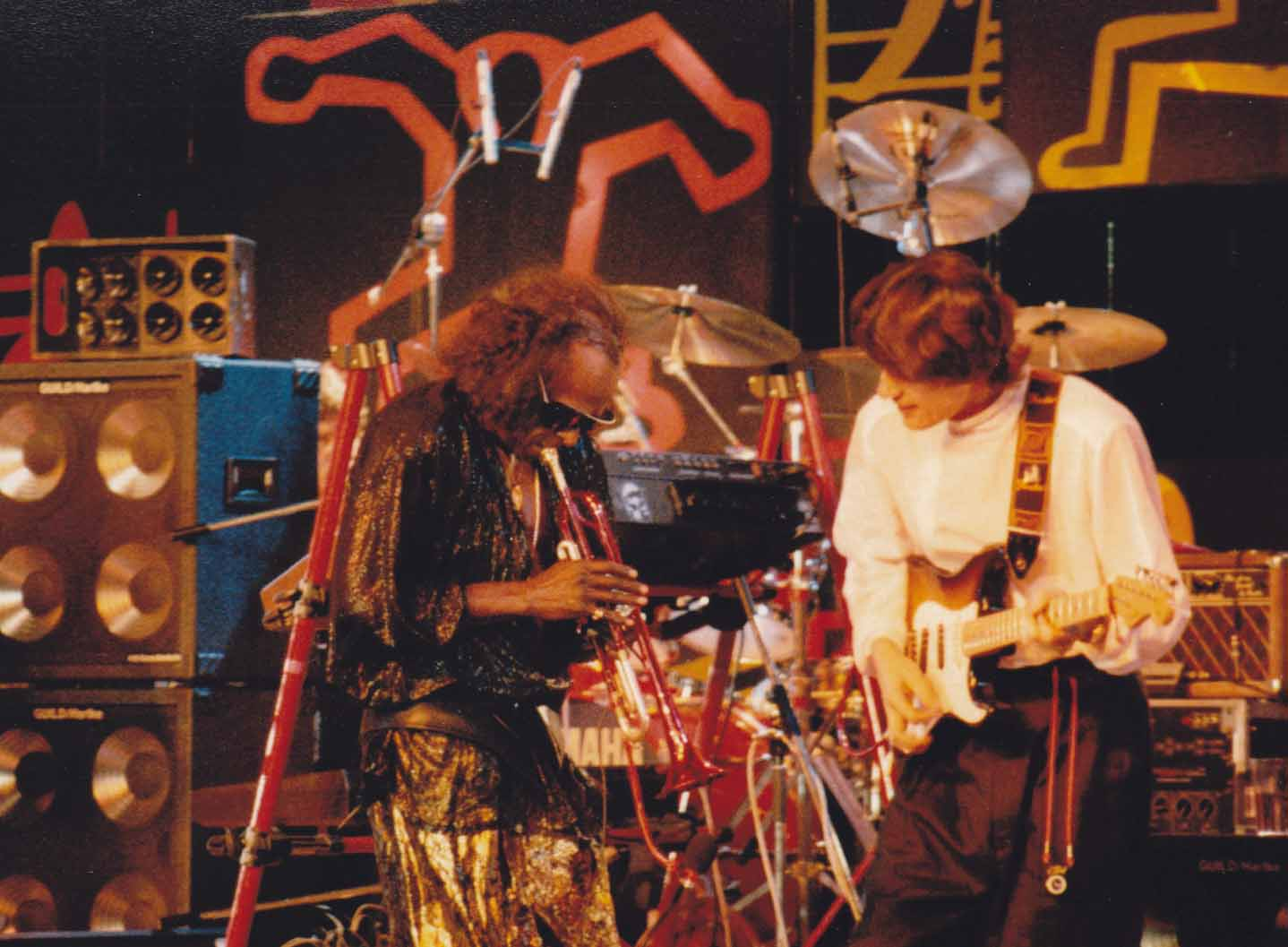
Miles Davis & Robben Ford in Montreux in 1986

After leaving the L.A. Express in 1976, Robben Ford recorded his first solo album, The Inside Story with a band that later became the Yellowjackets.

In 1977 Ford was one of over half a dozen session players asked to play a guitar solo for the Steely Dan song "Peg." The band eventually used a version by Jay Graydon. In 2006, a tribute album to Steely Dan – The Royal Dan – was released, with Ford covering "Peg" in his own style.

In 1982, Ford was one of several guitarists who appeared on the Kiss album Creatures of the Night, playing lead guitar on the songs "Rock And Roll Hell" and "I Still Love You".

Ford worked briefly with Miles Davis in 1986; and can be heard on Davis' Montreux box set. Ford released his second solo album Talk to Your Daughter in 1988. He joined Philippe Saisse, Marcus Miller and J.T. Lewis in the cast of The Sunday Night Band for the second and final season of the late-night NBC television program Sunday Night in 1989. In the 1990s, he released the albums Robben Ford and the Blue Line, Mystic Mile, Handful of Blues, Tiger Walk and Supernatural.

Robben Ford has received five Grammy Award nominations and was named one of the "100 Greatest Guitarists of the 20th Century" by Musician magazine. He credited pianist and arranger Roger Kellaway and saxophonist and arranger Tom Scott, whom he met while playing for Joni Mitchell, as major influences on his musical development.

Robben Ford divorced Anne Kerry Ford in 2018. As of 2023, he lives in London, England with his long time girlfriend, Milam Kelly Roberts.

In October 2022, Ford toured in Italy opening for Eric Clapton.

== Equipment ==
=== Guitars ===
Ford considers his first good electric a Guild Starfire III with a single Florentine (sharp) cutaway. He used a Gibson L-5 when he played with Charlie Musselwhite and the Ford Band, although he never thought it was a great guitar. While playing with Jimmy Witherspoon, Ford traded the L-5 plus $200 for a 1964 Gibson Super 400CES (which he sold in 1986). When Ford began playing with the L.A. Express and Joni Mitchell, he used a 1958 Gibson dot-neck ES-335. At some point he also acquired a 1963 Gibson ES-335.

After Ford's Talk to Your Daughter album was released in 1988, Robben used a Robben Ford Signature model guitar created in a collaboration with Dan Smith of Fender and produced in Japan between 1987 and 1993. That guitar was based on the Fender Master Series Esprit Ultra that was produced from 1983 to 1986 in Japan. In 1987, new management at Fender authorized the first production of the Robben Ford Signature guitar. In 1994, production of the guitar moved from Japan to the Fender Custom Shop. Three models were produced: Ultra FM (with a carved maple top), Ultra SP (with a carved spruce top), and the Elite FM (with a carved flame maple top). The guitar line continued to be produced until 2002 when it was discontinued by Fender.

Sometimes he plays a vintage 1960 Fender Telecaster, Gibson Les Pauls, a 1963 Gibson SG, a Gibson Es-335 12-string that he has set up as a 6-string, a 1966 Epiphone Riviera (with the original Bigsby tremolo removed and replaced with a stop tailpiece).

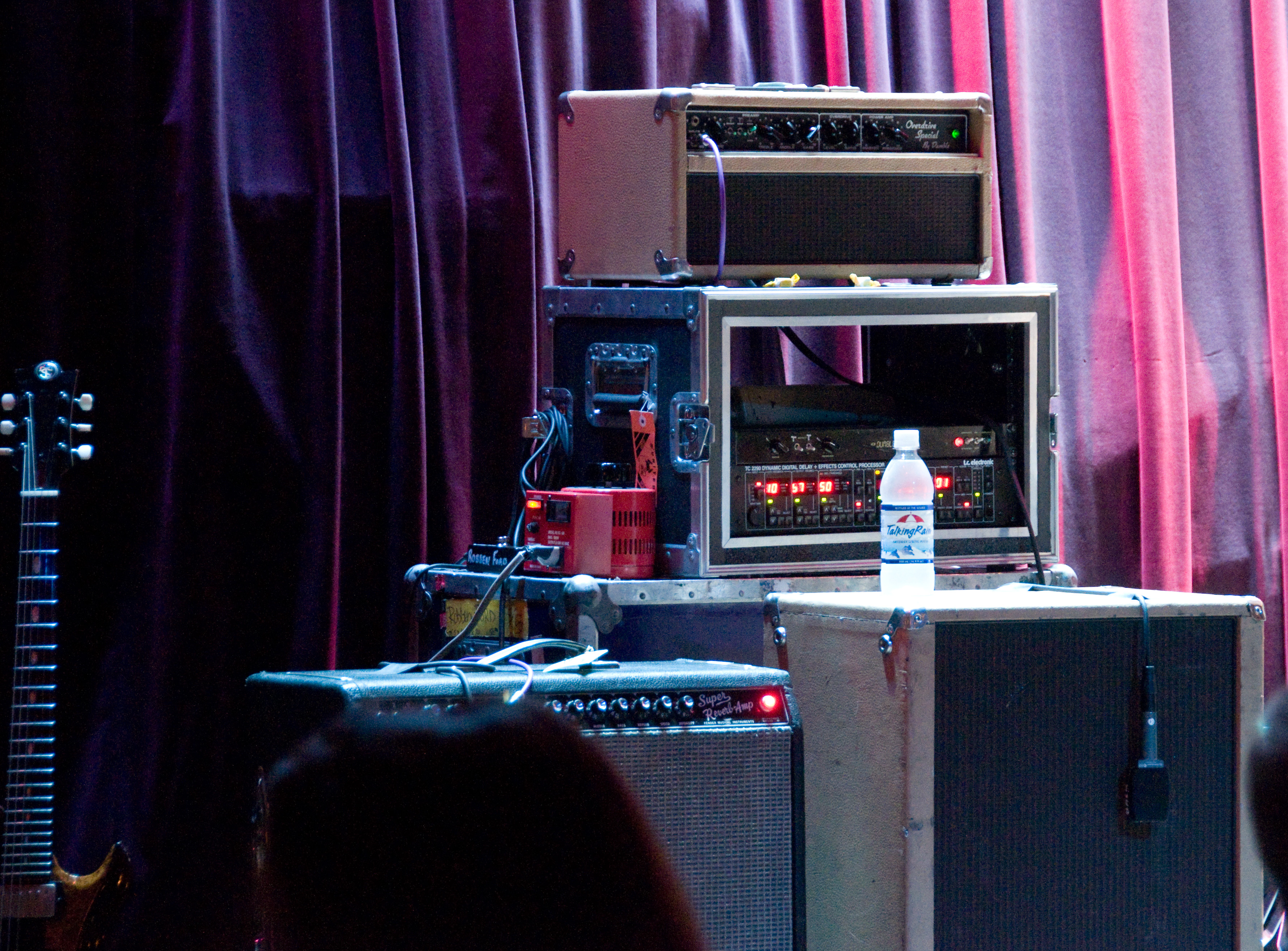
Ford's Dumble Overdrive Special

In a May 1–16, 2017 tour which ended in Niagara Falls NY, Ford debuted a newly acquired 1953 Gibson Les Paul.

In the summer of 2021 he teased a PRS Robben Ford Limited Edition McCarty signature guitar which was finally released in October 2022.

=== Amplifiers ===
Robben Ford uses Dumble Amplifiers and Celestion G12-65 speakers. In 1983, Alexander "Howard" Dumble made Robben's first Overdrive Special (serial #102) for Robben. Dumble himself was the owner of serial #001.

When traveling abroad he prefers taking his Dumble, but will sometimes use Fender Super Reverb or Fender Twin amplifiers. When playing his Fenders, Ford uses a Hermida Zendrive overdrive pedal, which was designed to replicate the sound of Ford's Dumble amplifier.

== Discography ==
=== As leader/co-leader ===
- Schizophonic (L.A. International, 1976)
- Live: Jimmy Witherspoon & Robben Ford (LAX, 1977)
- The Inside Story (Elektra, 1979)
- Talk to Your Daughter (Warner Bros., 1988)
- Minor Elegance (MGI, 1989) - with Joe Diorio
- Live at the Notodden Blues Festival (Blue Rock'it, 1992) - with Jimmy Witherspoon
- Robben Ford & the Blue Line (Stretch, 1992)
- Mystic Mile (Stretch, 1993)
- Handful of Blues (Blue Thumb, 1995)
- Ain't Nothin' New About the Blues (AIM, 1995) - with Jimmy Witherspoon
- Blues Connotation (ITM, 1997) - reissue of A Song I Thought I Heard Buddy Sing
- Tiger Walk (Blue Thumb, 1997)
- The Authorized Bootleg (Blue Thumb, 1997)
- Discovering the Blues (Avenue, 1997)
- Sunrise (Avenue, 1999)
- Supernatural (Blue Thumb, 1999)
- A Tribute to Paul Butterfield (Blue Rock'it, 2001)
- Blue Moon (Concord, 2002)
- Keep On Running (Concord, 2003)
- Truth (Concord, 2007)
- Soul on Ten (Concord, 2009)
- Bringing It Back Home (Provogue, 2013)
- A Day in Nashville (Provogue, 2014)
- Into the Sun (Provogue, 2015)
- Purple House (Ear Music, 2018)
- The Sun Room (Ear Music, 2019) - with Bill Evans
- Common Ground (13J Productions, 2020) - with Bill Evans
- Pure (Ear Music, 2021)
- Night in the City (Ear Music, 2023)
- Two Shades of Blue (Provo, 2026)

=== As member ===
Yellowjackets

- Yellowjackets (Warner Bros., 1981)
- Mirage a Trois (Warner Bros., 1983)
- Run for Your Life (GRP, 1994)
- Timeline (Mack Avenue, 2011)

=== As sideman ===
With Larry Carlton

- Live in Tokyo (335 Records, 2007)
- Unplugged (335 Records, 2013)

With A.J. Croce

- A.J. Croce (Private Music, 1993)
- That's Me in the Bar (Private Music, 1995)
- By Request (Compass Records, 2021)

With Tommy Emmanuel

- Can't Get Enough (Columbia, 1996)
- Midnight Drive (Higher Octave, 1997)

With Jerry Granelli

- One Day at a Time (ITM, 1990)
- Koputai (ITM, 1990)
- A Song I Thought I Heard Buddy Sing (ITM, 1992)
- Dance Hall (Justin Time, 2017)

With Jing Chi (Jimmy Haslip, Vinnie Colaiuta)

- Jing Chi (Tone Center, 2002)
- Live! (At Yoshi's) (Tone Center, 2003)
- 3D (Tone Center, 2004)
- Supremo (Tone Center, 2017)

With Little Feat

- Down on the Farm (Warner Bros., 1979)
- Hoy-Hoy! (Warner Bros., 1981)

With Barry Manilow

- Here Comes the Night (Arista, 1982)
- Oh Julie! [EP] (Arista, 1982)

With Eric Marienthal

- Oasis (GRP, 1991)
- Turn Up the Heat (Peak, 2001)

With Keiko Matsui

- A Drop of Water (Passport Jazz, 1986)
- Under Northern Lights (MCA, 1988)
- No Borders (MCA, 1990)

With Amanda McBroom

- Dreaming (Gecko; Analogue Productions, 1986)
- Midnight Matinee (Gecko; Analogue Productions, 1991)

With Michael McDonald

- If That's What It Takes (Warner Bros., 1982)
- No Lookin' Back (Warner Bros., 1985)
- Blink of an Eye (Reprise, 1993)

With Charlie Musselwhite

- Louisiana Fog (Cherry Red, 1968)
- Takin' My Time (Arhoolie, 1971)
- Goin' Back Down South (Arhoolie, 1974)
- Tell Me Where Have All the Good Times Gone? (Blue Rock'it, 1984)
- One Night in America (Telarc, 2001)

With John Kaizan Neptune

- West of Somewhere (Milestone, 1981)
- Mixed Bag (Eastworld, 1983)

With Renegade Creation

- Renegade Creation (Blues Bureau International, 2010)
- Bullet (Blues Bureau International, 2012)

With Tom Scott

- Tom Cat (Ode/A&M, 1975)
- Reed My Lips (GRP, 1994)
- Night Creatures (GRP, 1995)
- Bluestreak (GRP, 1996)

With Supersonic Blues Machine

- West of Flushing, South of Frisco (Provogue, 2016)
- Californisoul (Provogue, 2017)

With Jennifer Warnes

- Famous Blue Raincoat (Cypress, 1986)
- The Hunter (Private Music, 1992)

With Jimmy Witherspoon

- Spoonful (Blue Note, 1975)
- Live at the Mint (On The Spot/Private Music, 1996)

With others

- Gregg Bissonette, Submarine (Favored Nations, 2000)
- David Blue, Com'n Back for More (Asylum, 1975)
- Perry Botkin Jr., Ports (A&M, 1977)
- Chris Cain, So Many Miles (Blue Rock'it, 2010)
- Julie Christensen, Love Is Driving (Stone Cupid, 1996)
- Randy Crawford, Secret Combination (Warner Bros., 1981)
- Tiffany Darwish, New Inside (MCA, 1990)
- Miles Davis, Tutu (Warner Bros., 2011)
- DeBarge, All This Love (Gordy, 1982)
- Bob Dylan, Under the Red Sky (Columbia, 1990)
- Richard Elliot, Initial Approach (ITI, 1984)
- Bill Evans, Big Fun (ESC, 2002)
- Georgie Fame, Cool Cat Blues (Go Jazz, 1991)
- Brandon Fields, The Other Side of the Story (Nova, 1988)
- Anne Kerry Ford, In the Nest of the Moon (Illyria, 1996)
- Ruthie Foster, The Truth According to Ruthie Foster (Shock, 2009)
- Kenny Garrett, Old Folks (West Wind, 1999)
- Dizzy Gillespie, Rhythmstick (CTI, 1990)
- Arlo Guthrie, Power of Love (Warner Bros., 1981)
- Charlie Haden, Helium Tears (New Edition, 2005)
- George Harrison, Dark Horse (Apple, 1974)
- Amy Holland, On Your Every Word (Capitol, 1983)
- Christian Howes, Out of the Blue (Resonance, 2010)
- Rickie Lee Jones, Pop Pop (Geffen, 1991)
- Marc Jordan, A Hole in the Wall (Airplay, 1989)
- Kiss, Creatures of the Night (Casablanca, 1982)
- Greg Koch Band, Plays Well with Others (Rhymes With Chalk Music, 2013)
- Dave Koz, Lucky Man (Capitol, 1993)
- L.A. Express, L.A. Express (Caribou, 1976)
- Michael Landau, Renegade Creation (Blues Bureau International, 2010)
- Sonny Landreth, From the Reach (Landfall, 2008)
- Neil Larsen, Orbit (Straight Ahead, 2007)
- Ricky Lawson, First Things First (Videoarts, 1998)
- Ute Lemper, Crimes of the Heart (CBS, 1989)
- Kenny Loggins, Celebrate Me Home (Columbia, 1977)
- Jeff Lorber, Step It Up (Heads Up, 2015)
- Bob Malach, The Searcher (Go Jazz, 1995)
- Herbie Mann, Opalescence (Gaia, 1989)
- Ann-Margret, Born to Be Wild (Cleopatra, 2023)
- Kazu Matsui Project, Standing on the Outside (Lakeside, 1983)
- John Mayall, In the Palace of the King (Eagle, 2007)
- Brownie McGhee, Facts of Life (Blue Rock'it, 1985)
- Joni Mitchell, The Hissing of Summer Lawns (Asylum, 1975)
- Keb' Mo', Keep It Simple (Epic, 2004)
- Ivan Neville, Saturday Morning Music (UpTop Entertainment, 2002)
- Claus Ogerman, Claus Ogerman Featuring Michael Brecker (GRP, 1991)
- Brad Paisley, American Saturday Night (Arista, 2009)
- Paul Personne, Lost in Paris Blues Band (Ear Music, 2016)
- Shawn Phillips, Do You Wonder (A&M, 1975)
- Bonnie Raitt, Luck of the Draw (Capitol, 1991)
- Kenny Rankin, Hiding in Myself (Cypress, 1988)
- Helen Reddy, Play Me Out (MCA, 1981)
- Rudy Rotta, Some of My Favorite Songs for... (Pepper Cake, 2006)
- Leon Russell, Life Journey (Universal, 2014)
- Sanne Salomonsen, In a New York Minute (Virgin, 1998)
- David Sanborn, Hearsay (Elektra, 1994)
- Marilyn Scott, Without Warning! (Mercury, 1983)
- Rick Springfield, Working Class Dog (RCA, 1980)
- The Sylvers, Forever Yours (Casablanca, 1978)
- Eric Tagg, Dreamwalkin (Pony Canyon, 2015)
- Toots Thielemans, East Coast West Coast (Private Music, 1994)
- William Topley, Mixed Blessing (Mercury, 1998)
- Walter Trout, We're All in This Together (Provogue, 2017)
- Carl Verheyen, Trading 8s (Cranktone, 2009)
- Sadao Watanabe, Encore! (JVC, 2017)
- Steve Weingart, Life Times Vol. 01 (Skeewa Music, 2003)
- The Whispers, Love Is Where You Find It (Solar, 1982)
- Anders Wihk, Same Tree Different Fruit (Videoarts, 2012) - featured on "Fernando"
- Bruce Willis, If It Don't Kill You It Just Makes You Stronger (Motown, 1989)
- Tsuyoshi Yamamoto, Another Holiday (Warner Bros., 1985)
- Jesse Colin Young, The Perfect Stranger (Elektra, 1982)

== Videos ==
- Robben Ford and the Blue Line: In Concert (Recorded April 7, 1993)
- Robben Ford: New Morning - The Paris Concert (Recorded May 2001)
- Playing the Blues (2002)
- The Blues and Beyond (2002)
- Back to the Blues (2004)
- Autour Du Blues: Larry Carlton and Robben Ford (2006)
- The Robben Ford Clinic: The Art of Blues Rhythm (2007)
- Robben Ford: In Concert: Revisited (2008)
- The Robben Ford Clinic: The Art of Blues Solos (2009)
- Robben Ford Trio: New Morning the Paris Concert: Revisited (2009)
