= Turpentine (song) =

1990 song by Hole

Song by Hole
- Released: June 26, 1997
- Recorded: March 17, 1990 at Rudy's Rising Star in Los Angeles, California
- Genre: Alternative rock, punk rock, noise rock
- Length: 4:01
- Label: Sympathy for the Record Industry
- Songwriters: Courtney Love, Eric Erlandson
- Producers: James Moreland, Eric Erlandson

"Turpentine" is a song by the American alternative rock band Hole. It was written by vocalist and rhythm guitarist Courtney Love and lead guitarist Eric Erlandson. The song was one of the band's first compositions and remained unreleased for seven years before being released on the band's second EP, The First Session on August 26, 1997. Although not as well known as Hole's later songs, "Turpentine" is a notable song for the band as it is often cited as "the first Hole song."

== Origin and recording ==
"Turpentine" was reputedly the first song written for Hole, with the music composed Eric Erlandson and the lyrics written by Courtney Love. The song is known to have been written as early as November 1989 as Hole performed the song during their third live show in Huntington Beach, California on November 11, 1989. However, some of the lyrics of the song seem to have been written by Love earlier with the line "my water breaks like turpentine" appearing in a poem written by Love in the mid-late 1980s which also features lines that would later appear in "Loaded", a track on Hole's debut album, Pretty on the Inside (1991).

The first and only known studio version of the song was recorded on March 17, 1990 during Hole's first studio session at Rudy's Rising Star, a "tiny ... basement studio" in Los Angeles, California after Sympathy for the Record Industry's president, Long Gone John, gave the band a budget of $500 to record their first single, "Retard Girl."

== Composition ==
=== Music ===
The musical content of "Turpentine" is highly influenced by punk rock, noise rock and no wave music. The song's chord progression shifts throughout the song with the verse riff being composed with four chord progression. The pre-chorus uses a two chord progression which is widely used in punk music and further progressions baring resemblance to no wave music. In the studio version of the song, the guitars are tuned down and throughout the entirety of the song use distortion and the drums are also emphasised in the song. The song follows an A-B-C-A musical form.

=== Lyrics ===
"Turpentine" is typical of Love's writing standards at the time, using sardonic and cryptic imagery as well as the frequent usage of derogatory terms. The song, however, also uses religious imagery, most obvious in the line "I know all you devils by your Christian names" and "bless my body / bless my soul." One interpretation of the song's lyrics refers to it as Love's "mockery on ... Christianity." However, there are also several allusions to themes such as alienation and self-image, both of which are significant themes in lyrics on Pretty on the Inside and also Live Through This (1994). One of the main lyrics of the song ("my water breaks like turpentine") was also later featured as a lyric on "20 Years in the Dakota," a song recorded in 1992 and released on the "Beautiful Son" single and similarly, a large proportion of the lyrics were featured, alongside the lyrics to "Burn Black," on "Amen," an outtake from Nobody's Daughter (2010).

== Personnel ==
Hole

- Courtney Love – vocals, guitar
- Eric Erlandson – guitar
- Jill Emery – bass
- Caroline Rue – drums, percussion

Technical personnel

- James Moreland – producer, engineer
- Eric Erlandson – additional producer
- John Vestman – mastering
