= Schizophonic (Robben Ford album) =

Studio album by Robben Ford
- Released: 1976
- Genre: Jazz
- Length: 37:26
- Label: BMG/ARG Jazz
- Producer: Chris Huston

Robben Ford chronology
Jimmy Witherspoon & Robben Ford Live (1976)	Schizophonic (1976)	The Inside Story (1979)

Professional ratings
Review scores
Source	Rating
AllMusic	2/5 stars
The Penguin Guide to Blues Recordings	3/4 stars

Schizophonic is a jazz album by Robben Ford, released in 1976. The album title refers to Robben Ford's interest in playing two instruments. He began playing saxophone at the age of ten, but at thirteen he heard blues guitarist Mike Bloomfield. The music is a mix between different styles of jazz. From blues in the first track, alongside Latin to more jazz fusion as known from his later album The Inside Story. On the first track and the last track Ford plays the saxophone.

== Track listing ==
All tracks composed by Robben Ford

1. "Miss Miss" – 6:34
2. "Ladies' Choice" – 6:30
3. "Hawk's Theme" – 5:37
4. "Low Ride" – 2:26
5. "Stella and Frenchie" – 8:00
6. "Softly Rolling" – 7:28

== Personnel ==
- Robben Ford – guitar, saxophone
- Paul Nagle – keyboards
- Stan Poplin – bass
- Jim Baum – drums

Production

- Chris Hudson – production, engineering
- Ken Perry, Chris Clarke – mastering
