= Tiger Walk =

Tiger Walk may refer to:

- Tiger Walk (Auburn), a procession of players before each Auburn home football game
- Tiger Walk (album), an album by Robben Ford
