= A. J. Croce (album) =

A.J. Croce

Studio album by A. J. Croce
- Released: 1993
- Genre: Jazz
- Length: 40:09
- Label: Private Music
- Producers: T-Bone Burnett, John Simon

A. J. Croce chronology
A.J. Croce (1993)	That's Me in the Bar (1995)

A. J. Croce is the debut album by American singer-songwriter A.J. Croce, released in 1993.

== Background ==
Croce was 21 years old when he made the debut album. The album was a result of his performance inducting his father, singer-songwriter Jim Croce, into the Songwriter's Hall of Fame. His record label, Private Music decided they wouldn't mount a campaign for a particular single from the album, instead they decided to let radio programmers listen to the entire album and decide for themselves what they wanted to play on the air. Croce said the feedback was "surprisingly supportive".

The album featured heavyweights from the music industry including; producer John Simon, guitarist and songwriter T Bone Burnett, drummer Jim Keltner, guitarist Robben Ford and keyboardist Benmont Tench. The album entered the top ten U.S. jazz chart in 1993.

== Track listing ==
All songs written by A.J. Croce, except where noted. (Note: Track listing, personnel and production crew adapted from liner notes)

1. "He's Got a Way with Women" (Rodney Lay, Hank Thompson) – 3:31
2. "Which Way Steinway" – 3:21
3. "I Wonder" (Cecil Gant, Raymond Leveen) – 5:01
4. "How'd We Get So Good at Sayin' Good-Bye" – 4:06
5. "I Found Faith" – 2:45
6. "Keep on Lookin'" – 4:09
7. "She Wouldn't Give Me None" (Minnie McCoy, Joe McCoy) – 3:15
8. "I Know Better Now" – 3:11
9. "Back Where I Began" – 3:00
10. "Smokin' Good Time" – 3:15
11. "Stuff You Gotta Watch" (Tom Dowd, Dan Greer, George Jackson) – 2:32
12. "If I Could Be with You (One Hour Tonight)" (Henry Creamer, James P. Johnson) – 2:03

== Personnel ==
- A.J. Croce – piano, vocals
- Bob Boss – electric guitar
- Garnett Brown – trombone
- T-Bone Burnett – acoustic guitar
- Armando Campion – acoustic bass
- Ron Carter – bass, acoustic bass
- Evan Christopher – clarinet, tenor saxophone
- Armando Compion – bass, electric bass
- Dave Curtis, Tim Drummond – electric bass
- Sally Dworsky – background vocals
- Chuck Findley – trumpet
- Robben Ford – acoustic guitar, guitar, electric guitar
- Gary Herbig – baritone saxophone
- Dick Hyde – tuba

- Jim Keltner, Paul Kimbarow – drums
- Mitch Manker & his Brass Section – trumpet
- Arnold McCuller – background vocals
- Carolyn Perry – background vocals
- Lori Perry – background vocals
- Sharon Perry – background vocals
- Greg Prestopino – background vocals
- Bill Reichenbach, Jr. – trombone, bass trombone
- Jim Self – tuba
- Paco Shipp – harmonica, tenor saxophone
- John Simon – conductor
- Fred Tackett – acoustic guitar, dobro
- Benmont Tench – organ
- Snooky Young – flugelhorn

== Production ==
- Producers: T-Bone Burnett, John Simon
- Engineers: Steve MacMillan, Joe Schiff, Allen Sides
- Assistant engineers: Jim Champagne, Noel Hazen
- Mastering: Chris Bellman
- Production coordination: Joe Henry

- Arrangers: Evan Christopher, Mitch Manker and his Brass Section, John Simon
- Art direction: Melanie Penny
- Design: Kurt DeMunbrun
- Photography: William Claxton

== Reception ==
Billboard Magazine said his debut album "covers acres, as much a tribute to the New Orleans piano masters, the Memphis soul sound, and the Basie-era Kansas City scene as it is a showcase for the artist's impressive songwriting, vocal, and piano playing talents". They also praised the "all-star cast" of players, saying; "together they pulled off a project that in lesser hands would be overambitious".

Graham Coxon wrote in Guitar Player that "Croce masterfully writes and performs songs reminiscent of '30s jazz, '40s jump blues, and late '60s New Orleans R&B, while the supporting musicians provide authentic period feel without sounding dated". Overall, he opined it was "refreshing music that eases the mind and soothes the soul".

Thomas Erlewine from AllMusic said the album "showcases his flair for low-key, atmospheric blues. As a performer, he's surprisingly confident and assured. As a songwriter, he still relies a little too heavily on cliches, but the best songs show potential, and that's what makes A.J. Croce a winning debut".
