= Sunrise (Robben Ford album) =

Live album by Robben Ford
- Released: 1999
- Recorded: October 1972
- Venue: The Ash Grove, Hollywood, California; The Golden Bear, Huntington, California; The Marquee Club, London
- Genre: Jazz, blues
- Label: Avenue Jazz
- Producer: Jerry Goldstein

Robben Ford chronology
The Authorized Bootleg (1998)	Sunrise (1999)	Anthology: The Early Years (2001)

Sunrise is an album of live recordings made in 1972 by Robben Ford, and released on CD in 1999. Though Ford's music ranged over jazz, blues and rock music styles, this album is rooted in jazz, despite some of the songs having been composed by blues artists. The songs on this album were recorded live in clubs noted at the time for introducing promising new artists to the music world.

== Track listing ==
1. "Oh Gee" – 6:31
2. "Red Rooster" (Willie Dixon) – 4:25
3. "Eighty One" (Miles Davis, Ron Carter) – 8:08
4. "Ain't Nobody's Business" (Jimmy Witherspoon, Clarence Williams, G.R. Prince, Porter Grainger) – 3:50
5. "Sunrise" (Robben Ford) – 11:28
6. "Blue & Lonesome" (Little Walter Jacobs) – 8:23
7. "Miss Miss" (Robben Ford) – 8:58
8. "Everyday I Have the Blues" (Peter Chatman) – 5:26

== Personnel ==
- Robben Ford – guitar, saxophone, vocals
- Paul Nagle – keyboards
- Stan Poplin – bass guitar
- Jim Baum – drums
- Jimmy Witherspoon – lead vocal on "Ain't Nobody's Business"

== Production ==
"Recorded live by Far Out mobile recording unit in 1972 at the Ash Grove, Hollywood, California; The Golden Bear, Huntington Beach, California; and The Marquee Club, London, England."
