= Soul on Ten =

Live album by Robben Ford
- Released: August 11, 2009
- Genre: Blues, jazz fusion
- Length: 68:03
- Label: Concord
- Producer: Robben Ford

Robben Ford chronology
Truth (2007)	Soul on Ten (2009)	Bringing It Back Home (2013)

Soul on Ten is an album by American guitarist Robben Ford that was released on August 11, 2009. Eight of the tracks are live recordings from an appearance in San Francisco in April 2009. The album includes cover versions of "Spoonful" by Willie Dixon and "Please Set a Date" by Elmore James in addition to three new songs: "Earthquake", "Don’t Worry About Me", and "Thoughtless".

== Track listing ==
All tracks composed by Robben Ford except where indicated

1. "Supernatural" (Kevin Sandbloom)
2. "Indianola"
3. "There'll Never Be Another You"
4. "Spoonful" (Willie Dixon)
5. "Nothin' to Nobody" (Ford, Michael MacDonald)
6. "Please Set a Date/You Don't Have To Go" (Elmore James)
7. "Earthquake"
8. "How Deep in the Blues (Do You Want To Go)" (Ford, Gary Nicholson)
9. "Don't Worry 'Bout Me"
10. "Thoughtless"

== Personnel ==
- Robben Ford – guitar, vocals
- Neal Evans – organ
- Travis Carlton – bass guitar
- Toss Panos – drums
