= Adrian James Croce (album) =

Studio album by A. J. Croce
- Released: July 27, 2004
- Genre: Rock
- Length: 46:41
- Label: Seedling/Eleven Thirty

A. J. Croce chronology
Transit (2000)	Adrian James Croce (2004)	Early On – The American Recordings 1993–1998 (2005)

Professional ratings
Review scores
Source	Rating
Allmusic	link

Adrian James Croce is the fifth album by American singer-songwriter A. J. Croce, released in 2004.

== Track listing ==
All songs written by A. J. Croce, except where noted

1. "Don't Let Me Down" (Croce, Steve Poltz) – 3:25
2. "Baby Tonight" – 3:11
3. "Call Me Dear" – 3:03
4. "Lying on the Ground" (Croce) – 4:10
5. "Too Soon" (Laurie Barth, Croce, Dave Howard) – 2:53
6. "I Believe" (Croce, Poltz) – 3:35
7. "Upside Down" (Croce, Howard) – 4:10
8. "Cold" – 1:48
9. "You're Not There" – 2:49
10. "Alone and Together" – 3:02
11. "Hung Up (On You)" – 3:12
12. "What You Want" – 3:41
13. "Almost Angeline" (Croce, Howard) – 2:58
14. "How Long" – 4:44

== Personnel ==
- A. J. Croce – organ, acoustic guitar, guitar, piano, electric piano, vocals, background vocals
- David Curtis – bass
- Davey Faragher – bass
- Dave Howard – background vocals
- Nick Kirgo – electric guitar, slide guitar
- Greg Leisz – mandolin
- Phil Smith – background vocals

== Production ==
- String arrangements: A. J. Croce, Herman Jackson
