= Fit to Serve =

Studio album by A. J. Croce
- Released: March 10, 1998
- Genre: Rock
- Length: 42:42
- Label: Platinum Records
- Producer: A. J. Croce, Jim Gaines, Mark Lampe

A. J. Croce chronology
That's Me in the Bar (1995)	Fit to Serve (1998)	Transit (2000)

Professional ratings
Review scores
Source	Rating
Allmusic	link

Fit to Serve is the third studio album by American singer-songwriter A. J. Croce, released in 1998.

== Track listing ==
all songs by A. J. Croce, except where noted

1. "Fit to Serve" – 3:39
2. "I Don't Mind" – 3:04
3. "Lover's Serenade" – 3:55
4. "Trouble in Mind" (Richard M. Jones) – 3:19
5. "Texas Ruby" (Croce, Gary Nicholson) – 3:34
6. "Uncommon Sense" – 3:31
7. "I'll Get Through" – 3:04
8. "Cry to Me" (Bert Russell) – 3:51
9. "So in Love" – 3:20
10. "Count the Ways" – 3:31
11. "Too Late" – 3:07
12. "Judgement Day" (Croce, Nicholson) – 2:27
13. "Nobody Else" – 2:20

== Personnel ==
- A. J. Croce – piano, vocals
- David Curtis – bass
- Paul Kimbarow – drums

== Production ==
- Producers: A. J. Croce, Jim Gaines, Mark Lampe
