= The Birth of Alternative Vol. 2 =

Compilation album by Various artists
- Released: October 10, 2003
- Genre: Alternative; grunge
- Label: Flashback

Various artists chronology
The Birth of Alternative Vol. 1 (2003)	The Birth of Alternative Vol. 2 (2003)

Professional ratings
Review scores
Source	Rating
AllMusic	2.5/5 stars

The Birth of Alternative Vol. 2 is a compilation album released in 1998, from Rhino's Flashback Records imprint.

== Track listing ==
1. "About a Girl" by Nirvana (from Bleach) – 02:49
2. "Sweet Young Thing Ain't Sweet No More" by Mudhoney (from Boiled Beef & Rotting Teeth) – 03:47
3. "Between the Eyes" by Love Battery (from Between the Eyes) – 04:30
4. "Down in the Dark" by Mark Lanegan (from The Winding Sheet) – 03:22
5. "Change Has Come" by Screaming Trees (from Change Has Come) – 03:20
6. "Retarded" by The Afghan Whigs (from Up in It) – 03:26
7. "Go Your Own Way" by Seaweed (from Go Your Own Way EP and the Clerks soundtrack) – 03:53
8. "3-D Witch Hunt" by Tad (from 8-Way Santa) – 03:35
9. "Touch Me I'm Sick" by Mudhoney (from Boiled Beef & Rotting Teeth) – 02:34
10. "Burn Black" by Hole (from the "Dicknail" single) – 04:56
