= Transit (A. J. Croce album) =

Studio album by A. J. Croce
- Released: February 29, 2000
- Genre: Rock
- Length: 40:23
- Label: Higher Octave Music
- Producer: Michael James, David Zeman

A. J. Croce chronology
Fit to Serve (1998)	Transit (2000)	Adrian James Croce (2004)

Professional ratings
Review scores
Source	Rating
Allmusic	link

Transit is the fourth studio album by American singer-songwriter A. J. Croce, released in 2000 (see 2000 in music).

== Track listing ==
1. "Maybe" (Croce, Michael James) – 3:58
2. "It's Only Me [Oh Ya-Ya]" (Croce) – 2:59
3. "Turn Out the Light" (Croce, James) – 3:22
4. "Summer Can't Come Too Soon" (Croce, Dave Howard) – 3:35
5. "The Bargain" (Croce) – 3:22
6. "Find Out Now" (Croce) – 4:35
7. "Everyman" (Croce, Howard) – 3:08
8. "What I Wouldn't Do" (Croce, James, David Zemen) – 3:04
9. "Change" (Croce) – 2:26
10. "Five" (Croce) – 2:58
11. "She Was Always Right" (Croce) – 3:13
12. "Don't Leave Me Now" (Croce, Marlo Croce) – 3:43

== Singles ==
One single was released on 45 and cd single:

Maybe b/w Summer Can't Come Too Soon

== Personnel ==
- A. J. Croce – piano, vocals

== Production ==
- Producers: Michael James, David Zeman
- Executive producers: Matt Marshall, Dan Selene
- Engineers: Michael James, Cesar Ramirez, Fredrik Sarhagen
- Assistant engineer: Jesse Gorman
- Mixing: Michael James, Urban Olsson
- Mastering: David Donnelly
- Art direction: Robert Fisher
- Design: Robert Fisher
- Photography: Alison Dyer
