= Anne Kerry Ford =

American cabaret singer and actress

- Born: June 8, 1958; Texas
- Occupation(s): Actress, Singer

Anne Kerry Ford (June 8, 1958) is an American cabaret singer and actress.

== Early years and education ==
A native Texan, Anne Kerry Ford began her career by attending The Academy of The Washington Ballet prior to her acceptance at Juilliard School of Drama at the age of 16. After graduating from Juilliard at the age of 20, she worked extensively in classical theatre before making her Broadway debut as Grace Farrell in Annie.

== Career ==
Anne Kerry Ford's film work includes playing Dudley Moore's wife in Marshall Brickman's Lovesick, as well as appearing in Clean and Sober, and in Peter Weir's Fearless.

Anne Kerry Ford starred with Amanda McBroom in Harry Chapin: Lies and Legends in Chicago and also appeared on the cast album of the show. Returning to Broadway to appear in The Threepenny Opera with Sting in 1989, she followed that by creating the role of Margaret in the musical Jekyll & Hyde opposite John Cullum.

Her ex-husband, guitarist Robben Ford, produced her first solo CD, In the Nest of the Moon. This was followed by the release of her second album, Something's Coming in 1998. Her original performance of Weill based on the songs of Kurt Weill was recorded in Germany at Cologne's Philharmonic Hall by WDR's Big Band.
