= Into the Sun (Robben Ford album) =

Studio album by Robben Ford
- Released: March 31, 2015
- Genre: Blues
- Length: 42:47
- Label: Provogue
- Producer: Robben Ford

Robben Ford chronology
A Day In Nashville (2014)	Into the Sun (2015)

Into the Sun is a 2015 album by five-time Grammy nominee and blues artist Robben Ford.

== Track listing ==
1. "Rose of Sharon" 3:12
2. "Day of the Planets" 3:29
3. "Howlin' at the Moon" 3:47
4. "Rainbow Cover" 3:12
5. "Justified" (with Keb Mo & Robert Randolph) 4:06
6. "Breath of Me" (with ZZ Ward) 4:52
7. "High Heels and Throwing Things" (with Warren Haynes) 3:22
8. "Cause of War" 3:34
9. "So Long 4 U" (with Sonny Landreth) 5:11
10. "Same Train" 3:56
11. "Stone Cold Heaven" (with Tyler Bryant) 3:47

== Personnel ==
- Robben Ford - guitar
