= The Birth of Alternative Vol. 1 =

Compilation album by Various artists
- Released: 1998
- Genre: Alternative; grunge
- Label: Flashback

Various artists chronology
The Birth of Alternative Vol. 1 (1998)	The Birth of Alternative Vol. 2 (2003)

Professional ratings
Review scores
Source	Rating
AllMusic	2.5/5 stars

The Birth of Alternative Vol. 1 is a compilation album released in 1998, from Rhino's Flashback Records.

== Track listing ==
1. "Blew" by Nirvana (from Bleach) – 2:57
2. "Love or Confusion" by Screaming Trees (from Sub Pop 200) – 3:21
3. "Indian Summer" by Beat Happening (from Jamboree) – 3:07
4. "Truly" by Hazel (from Toreador of Love) – 6:16
5. "Turn on the Water" by The Afghan Whigs (from Congregation) – 4:24
6. "You Got It" by Mudhoney (from Mudhoney) – 2:56
7. "Where Did You Sleep Last Night?" by Mark Lanegan (from The Winding Sheet) – 3:59
8. "Ritual Device" by Tad (from God's Balls) – 2:52
9. "Love Buzz" by Nirvana (from Blew (EP)) – 3:36
10. "Dicknail" by Hole – 3:40
