= Blues Connotation =

Studio album by Robben Ford
- Released: 1997
- Recorded: November 21–25, 1988; January–February 1992
- Studio: London Bridge Studios, Seattle
- Genre: Blues
- Length: 57 minutes
- Label: ITM Pacificnno; 970083

Blues Connotation is an album by American blues guitarist Robben Ford.

The album A Song I thought I heard Buddy Sing contains material from the same sessions and was released in 1993 under Jerry Granelli's name.

== Track listing ==
1. "City Life" (Jerry Granelli) — 9:28
2. "One Day at a Time" (Jerry Granelli, Charlie Haden) — 8:33
3. "I Could See Forever" (Denney Goodhew) — 6:27
4. "Wanderlust" (Johnny Hodges) — 7:41
5. "Billie's Bounce" (Charlie Parker) — 6:24
6. "I Put a Spell on You" (Screamin' Jay Hawkins) — 7:30
7. "Blues Connotation" (Ornette Coleman) — 6:06
8. "Blues Connotation Reprise" (Ornette Coleman) — 4:08

== Personnel ==
- Robben Ford, Bill Frisell - guitar
- Anthony Cox, Charlie Haden - bass
- Ralph Towner - synthesizer
- Jerry Granelli - drums, synthesizer
- Kenny Garrett - alto saxophone
- Julian Priester - trombone

Technical

- Rick Parashar - engineer
