= That's Me in the Bar =

Studio album by A. J. Croce
- Released: 1995
- Recorded: 1995
- Genre: Rock
- Length: 36:35
- Label: Private Music
- Producer: Jim Keltner

A. J. Croce chronology
A. J. Croce (1993)	That's Me in the Bar (1995)	Fit to Serve (1998)

Professional ratings
Review scores
Source	Rating
Allmusic	3/5 stars

That's Me in the Bar is the second studio album by American singer-songwriter A. J. Croce, released in 1995.

== Track listing ==
All songs written by A.J. Croce, except where noted

1. "That's Me in the Bar" (Croce, David Curtis) – 3:54
2. "Sign on the Line" (Croce, Ramsey McClean) – 2:53
3. "She's Waiting for Me" – 2:47
4. "Checkin' In" – 2:34
5. "Music Box" – 2:49
6. "Callin' Home" – 2:10
7. "Night Out on the Town" – 3:17
8. "Pass Me By" – 2:38
9. "I Meant What I Said" – 3:50
10. "Maybe I'm to Blame" – 2:14
11. "I Confess" – 3:14
12. "Some People Call It Love" – 4:15

== Personnel ==
- A.J. Croce – piano, vocals
- Sweet Pea Atkinson – vocals
- Robert Becker – viola
- Sir Harry Bowens – vocals
- Stephen Bruton – guitar
- Ry Cooder – bass, mandolin, slide guitar
- Rudy Copeland – organ
- Bruce Dukov – violin
- Robben Ford – guitar
- Bob Glaub – bass
- John Goux – guitar, slide guitar
- David Hidalgo – accordion
- Dan Higgins – clarinet
- Suzie Katayama – cello
- Jim Keltner – bass, drums
- John Leftwich – bass, acoustic bass
- Mitch Manker & his Brass Section – trumpet
- Jonell Mosser – vocals
- Sid Page – violin
- Dean Parks – guitar
- Billy Payne – piano
- Bill Reichenbach Jr. – trombone
- Waddy Wachtel – guitar

== Production ==
- Producer: Jim Keltner
- Arranger: David Hidalgo, John Leftwich
