= Truth (Robben Ford album) =

Studio album by Robben Ford
- Released: August 7, 2007
- Recorded: December 2006 – January 2007
- Studios: Avatar Studios (New York City, New York); Stagg Street Studio (Van Nuys, California); Waystation and Newhouse (Los Angeles, California); Zircon Skye (Ojai, California)
- Genre: Blues
- Length: 56:07
- Label: Concord
- Producer: Robben Ford

Robben Ford chronology
Keep on Running (2003)	Truth (2007)	Soul on Ten (2009)

Truth is an album by guitarist Robben Ford, notable for a well-received cover of Paul Simon's 1971 song "One Man's Ceiling is Another Man's Floor." "Riley B. King" is a homage to B.B. King.

Truth was nominated for the 2008 Grammy Award for Best Contemporary Blues Album and in August 2007 it became the number one blues album on the Billboard chart.

== Track listing ==
1. "Lateral Climb" (Robben Ford) - 4:19
2. "How Deep in the Blues (Do You Want To Go)" (Gary Nicholson, Robben Ford) - 4:18
3. "Nobody's Fault But Mine" (Otis Redding) - 3:12
4. "Riley B. King" (Kevin Moore, Robben Ford) - 6:16
5. "You're Gonna Need a Friend" (Anne Kerry Ford, Robben Ford) - 5:44
6. "One Man's Ceiling is Another Man's Floor" (Paul Simon) - 4:37
7. "Too Much" (Gabriel Ford) - 4:13
8. "Peace on My Mind" (Robben Ford) - 6:01
9. "There'll Never Be Another You" (Robben Ford) - 5:15
10. "River of Soul" (Danny Flowers, Robben Ford) - 6:18
11. "Moonchild Blues" (Robben Ford) - 5:41

== Personnel ==
- Robben Ford – vocals, guitars, Wurlitzer electric piano (6)
- Bernie Worrell – Wurlitzer electric piano (2, 4)
- Larry Goldings – Hammond B3 organ (3, 5, 7, 8), Wurlitzer electric piano (8)
- Russell Ferrante – acoustic piano (10)
- Jeff Babko – Hammond B3 organ (11)
- Will Lee – bass (1, 2, 4, 9)
- Chris Chaney – bass (3, 5, 8, 10)
- Jimmy Earl – bass (6, 7, 11)
- Charley Drayton – drums (1, 2, 4, 9)
- Gary Novak – drums (3, 5, 8, 10)
- Toss Panos – drums (6, 7)
- Bernie Dresel – drums (11)
- David Woodford – tenor saxophone (1, 3), baritone saxophone (3)
- Dan Fornero – trumpet (3)
- Roger Kellaway – horn arrangements (11)
- Siedah Garrett – backing vocals (3, 5, 10)
- Ken Stacey – backing vocals (3, 5, 10)
- Susan Tedeschi – vocals (6)

== Production ==
- Rob Saslow – A&R
- Robben Ford – producer
- Niko Bolas – recording (1–5, 8, 9, 11)
- Dave Way – mixing (1–10), recording (6, 7, 10)
- Walter New – additional recording, mixing (11)
- Ken Eros – additional recording
- Brent Cambre – recording assistant (1–5, 8, 9, 11)
- Brian Montgomery – recording assistant (1–5, 8, 9, 11)
- Jun Murakawa – recording assistant (1–5, 8, 9, 11)
- Rafael Serrano – recording assistant (6, 7, 10)
- Bernie Grundman – mastering at Bernie Grundman Mastering (Hollywood, California)
- Mary Hogan – A&R administrator
- Andrew Pham – package design
- George B. Wells – photography
- Claudio Lugli – cover photo wardrobe design
- Dal Booth for db Management – management
