= Pretty on the Inside =

Studio album by Hole
- Released: September 17, 1991
- Recorded: March 1991
- Studios: Music Box Studios (Hollywood, Los Angeles, California, U.S.)
- Genres: Punk rock; noise rock; art punk
- Length: 38:26
- Labels: Caroline (United States); City Slang (Europe)
- Producers: Kim Gordon; Don Fleming

Hole chronology
Pretty on the Inside (1991)	Live Through This (1994)

Singles from Pretty on the Inside
- 1. "Teenage Whore" Released: September 2, 1991

Pretty on the Inside is the debut studio album by American alternative rock band Hole, released on September 17, 1991, in the United States on Caroline Records. Produced by Sonic Youth's Kim Gordon, and Gumball frontman Don Fleming, the album was Hole's first major label release after the band's formation in 1989 by vocalist, songwriter, and guitarist Courtney Love and lead guitarist Eric Erlandson.

Blending elements of punk rock, the album features distorted and alternating guitar compositions, screaming vocals from Love, and "sloppy punk ethics", a style which the band would later distance themselves from, opting for a less abrasive sound on subsequent releases. Love's lyrics on the album are often presented in an abstract narrative form, and describe disparate scenes of graphic violence, death, and female sexuality. The record was dedicated to Rob Ritter of the Los Angeles punk rock acts the Bags and the Gun Club.

Upon release, Pretty on the Inside was well-received by alternative music critics, garnering favorable reviews that drew comparisons to the works of Black Sabbath and Patti Smith. It was met with considerable commercial success in the United Kingdom, where the record's lead single, "Teenage Whore", entered the UK Indie Chart at number one in September 1991. It has sold over 200,000 copies in the United States and gained a contemporary cult following among punk rock fans, and has been cited as a seminal influence for songwriters and musicians such as Brody Dalle and Scout Niblett. Despite its critical acclaim, frontwoman Courtney Love went on to refer to the album as "unlistenable" in later years, though her stance on it eventually shifted, as she commented in 2021 that she had "really put the album down," and that making it was a "transformative" experience for her. Vinyl LP versions of the album have been reissued several times.

== Background ==
Hole formed in 1989 in Los Angeles, California when frontwoman Courtney Love, after years of fruitless attempts at forming bands, bought her neighbor Lisa Roberts a bass and posted an advertisement in a local paper stating: "I want to start a band. My influences are Big Black, Sonic Youth, and Fleetwood Mac." Eric Erlandson, along with over a dozen other musicians, answered the ad. Love later said that she knew Eric was "the one" as soon as they met, and that he had a "Thurston Moore quality about him" that she liked.

Erlandson said that early in Hole's career, they were more interested in "making noise" than achieving success and before drummer Caroline Rue joined the band that they used no percussion whatsoever. It was not until Love and Erlandson heard Mudhoney's "Touch Me I'm Sick" that they began to think about taking the band to the next level. Early on, the band was most influenced by the New York No Wave art and music scene of the 1980s, which included visual artists, such as Richard Kern, as well as scuzz rock acts, such as Teenage Jesus and the Jerks, Sonic Youth, and Pussy Galore. The band also featured a rhythm guitarist in its early days, Mike Geisbrecht. After the band's first four shows, Geisbrecht and Roberts departed from the band. Hole recruited bassist Jill Emery in 1990, and the band remained a quartet instead of replacing Geisbrecht.

In the documentary film Not Bad for a Girl, Love, who had been in the erotic dancing industry for years prior, said that she worked as a stripper to help support the band in its early incarnation. She also cited her work as a dancer as being one of many inspirations for the songs on Pretty on the Inside: "I was blonde, wore makeup, had to support my band by dancing, and had to play this ridiculous archetype at work ... so I took, you know, high heels and white pumps, and I had a wiglet—I just took that and messed with it."

== Recording and production ==
"She was the most gung-ho person I've ever met ... She gave 180%. I've worked with some people that you've had to coax the performance out of them. With Courtney, there was no attitude."

— Producer Don Fleming on Courtney Love during the recording of the album, 2008 and 2011

Hole had previously released two singles, "Retard Girl" on Sympathy for the Record Industry and "Dicknail" on Sub Pop. According to Love, she had initially wanted to release the album on Sympathy for the Record Industry, but was "talked into" signing on with Caroline Records. After signing, Love sought Sonic Youth's Kim Gordon to produce the album. In January 1991, Love sent her a letter, a Hello Kitty barrette, and copies of the band's early singles, mentioning that the band greatly admired Gordon's work and appreciated "the production of the SST record" (referring to Sonic Youth's EVOL or Sister). Gordon agreed on the condition that her friend, Gumball frontman Don Fleming, assist. The band entered Music Box Studios in Los Angeles with Gordon and Fleming in March 1991, and worked on the album for one week; the songs were recorded over a period of four days, and were mixed over the course of a further three days. During the recording sessions for the album, Love purportedly gargled whiskey and excessively smoked cigarettes before takes to give a raw edge to her vocals.

Fleming stated he was impressed by Love's "focus and intensity", especially while recording vocals for one song when Love "literally ripped her clothes off while she sang". "Courtney was amazing", said Fleming. "She was the most gung-ho person I've ever met. She was going to make the greatest record ever—I like that attitude in the studio. Courtney was like 'Let's go, fuckers', and I loved that." In a later interview, Fleming said:

Courtney was great at the time—it was before she even knew Kurt [Cobain]. She gave 180%. I've worked with some people that you've had to coax the performance out of them. With Courtney, there was no attitude. She was gonna give it all. And she did and it was really impressive to me ... I loved the whole band; they were a lot of fun. That early lineup of Hole—I felt they were the real deal. They were Hollywood misfits—all of them. I felt it really captured what they were.

Gordon said that Love "was either charming and nice or screaming at her band" but that she was "a really good singer and entertainer and front person."

From her own recollection, Love said that the recording sessions lasted "about a week... Eric was in charge of the [guitar] tones, and I just did whatever the fuck I wanted." According to Rue, Gordon encouraged the band to freely improvise in the studio, which resulted in the recording of several tracks that appear on the album, such as "Sassy". Rue injured her finger on a diecast rim while recording the song, and ceased her drumming; Love is heard in the track saying "sit back down, sit back down" in response to Rue standing up from her drum kit.

== Composition ==
=== Music and arrangements ===
The music of Pretty on the Inside has been noted by critics for its abrasive instrumentation and arrangements, often with melodies "buried" underneath. The album's sonic elements are heavily influenced by Los Angeles hardcore punk as well as New York's no wave scene; many of the tracks are accompanied by overt use of feedback, experimental playing, wah pedals, and use of sampling and interpolation. Rapid sliding techniques and string muting are also heavily present on the album, as well as what Love and Erlandson describe as "Sonic Youth tunings". Love's vocals range from whispers to violent screaming, often in succession with the extreme shifts in speed and volume.

"It's unlistenable—that record was a calling card for rock critics and hardcorers, [saying] "This is what I do, and I'm not going to back down from it. I am announcing my persona as a cunt."

— Courtney Love, 2011

Drummer Caroline Rue described the band's songwriting process as collaborative and organic; she stated that she wrote her own drum parts in response to Love's guitar playing and lyrics, adding that Love never gave her direction or requested that she make changes to her drumming approach.

The album contains numerous musical references to other musicians and songs, specifically in "Sassy" and "Starbelly": The guitar riff featured in "Starbelly" is based on Neil Young's "Cinnamon Girl" and features analog cassette excerpts from "Rhiannon" by Fleetwood Mac and an early recording of "Best Sunday Dress" by Pagan Babies, one of Love's earlier bands with Kat Bjelland; "Sassy" includes snippets from an angry message left by Nymphs singer Inger Lorre on Love's answering machine, accompanied by a singular chord progression repeated throughout. Love has admitted that the main riff to "Mrs. Jones" was copied verbatim from "Dark Entries" by the goth rock group Bauhaus, one of her favorite bands as a teenager.

In a 1991 Canadian television interview, Love commented on the album's coarse musical structure. She said that since the band was from Los Angeles, the "metal capital of the US", they thought they were making a "pop record with an edge", and were surprised by people's reactions when they were told it was violent and extreme. Love added, "It was all about the expression of my experience. I was not coming from a black void; I was trying to create light ... I was trying to heal." In an interview with Spin magazine several years after its release, Love said that she was "posing in a lot of ways" with the album: "It was the truth, but it was also me catching up with all my hip peers who'd gone all indie on me, and who made fun of me for liking R.E.M. and The Smiths. I'd done the whole punk thing, sleeping on floors in piss and beer, and waking up with the guy with the fucking mohawk and the skateboards and the speed and the whole goddamned thing. But I hated it. I'd grown out of it by the time I was seventeen." In a 1994 interview with Kurt Loder, Love admitted to having been "consciously self-conscious" when making the record due to her feeling the need to compete with her peers at the time.

In the 2011 documentary Hit So Hard, based on Hole's 1994–98 drummer Patty Schemel, Love referred to Pretty on the Inside as "unlistenable". "That record was a calling card for rock critics and hardcorers", Love said. "[It was me saying] "This is what I do, and I'm not going to back down from it. I am announcing my persona as a cunt.""

=== Lyrical content ===
"Pretty on the Inside"
Sample of the album's title track, illustrating Love's screaming vocals and lyrics surrounding the theme of beauty.

Many of the album's lyrics are narrative and diaristic in nature, and were heavily drawn from Love's personal life and experiences in her teenage and young adult years. In a press release promoting the album, Love said: "These songs are about my own weaknesses and impurities; things about myself that I hate ... paranoias, petty concerns, and pithy, pathetic things that are inside of me." Many of the songs are lyrically abstract and describe shocking scenes of violence. Recurrent themes and motifs in the lyrics include elitism, beauty and self-image, abortion, prostitution, suicide, murder, "red lights", and self-destructiveness. Q's Peter Kane described the lyrics on the record as "confrontational" and "genuinely uninhibited".

In a 1991 interview with Love, journalist Ed Condran noted the influence of Los Angeles's underworld on the album: "The songs are allegories which detail Hollywood's filthy underbelly. Tales of teenage prostitution, violence, and superficiality are dramatically and graphically rendered. Some are so vivid a few writers assumed Love was writing from personal experience. However, she says the narratives are all fictional." Reflecting on Los Angeles in an interview the year prior, Love said: "When I first came down here I said it was the ugliest place I'd ever seen and I would never fucking live here. And now I'm here."

Hannah Levin of the Seattle publication The Stranger analyzed the lyrics to the track "Mrs. Jones", calling it a "particularly rattling sketch of what appears to be a rape scene, with Love seamlessly handling three perspectives: the ugly attacker ("Look into the bloodrot, you suicide bitch / It takes an hour with you to make me want to live"), the vengeful victim ("The abortion left an abscess / Don't ever talk to me like that again"), and the supportive narrator ("Just like a pro, she takes off her dress / And she kicks you down in her snow white pumps")." The song also quotes the Rudyard Kipling poem The Ballad of East and West. (Note: "East is east and west is west" is a famous line from "The Ballad of East and West" by Kipling; this exact phrase is quoted in the track "Mrs. Jones" on Hole's 1991 release, Pretty on the Inside.: See The Rudyard Kipling Society for publication history.)

"Garbadge Man", discusses abandonment and alienation, as well as crisis of spirituality, and is one of the few songs on the album to feature a verse–chorus–verse composition. The album closes with two songs that are bridged together as a single piece: "Pretty on the Inside", noted for its hostile lyrics and allusions to vanity, and "Clouds", a dark and raucous cover of Joni Mitchell's "Both Sides, Now" from her 1969 album Clouds. The cover of the song features altered lyrics that appear to illustrate a suicide scene.

According to drummer Caroline Rue, Love wrote the lyrics of "Babydoll" about Madonna, whom she had seen driving in Los Angeles in a Mercedes-Benz, hence the lyric referring to a "Nazi car".

In a 1991 interview with Everett True, Love stated "I try to place [beautiful imagery] next to fucked up imagery, because that's how I view things" and that "I sometimes feel that no one's taken the time to write about certain things in rock, that there's a certain female point of view that's never been given space." In spite of the album's graphic lyrics, though, the underlying female themes in many of its songs led some journalists to tag the band as being part of the riot grrl movement, which Love was not directly associated with.

== Artwork ==
Interior artwork from the CD version of the album, featuring a volatile collage of images and lyrics

The album artwork for Pretty on the Inside features a saturated pink press photo of the band amidst forest underbrush, taken by photographer Vickie Berndt. Berndt said that "Courtney wanted something striking and unusual" and Berndt was experimenting with color infrared film during the shoot, testing exposure settings with Love. The photo is similar to several others taken during the same shoot, one of which was featured in a Spin article in 1991.

The font design featured on the front cover was created by Pizz, a graphic artist from Long Beach, who also designed album cover art for several other indie rock bands. The back side of the album features a painting by bassist Emery, depicting a topless woman looking at herself through a hand mirror. On her chest is a red heart surrounded by arrows, and below, her ribs protrude from her sides.

The interior artwork (displayed in a booklet on the CD version of the album and on the record sleeve on vinyl releases), features an assemblage of scribbled and typewritten lyrics, personal "thank you" notes, cutouts of Catholic and Renaissance artwork, as well as childlike drawings and storybook pictures juxtaposed with photos of women in bondage. Love was banned from the Los Angeles Public Library for cutting out photos from library books to create the inlay artwork, which she said in retrospect, "I would never recommend that anyone" do. In a 2003 article published in The Stranger, the album's liner notes were likened to "the scrapbook of an incest victim". In the liner notes, the album is dedicated to Rob Ritter of the Los Angeles punk group the Bags.

== Release ==
=== Promotion ===
Caroline Records press kit cutout promoting the album (1991)

Pretty on the Inside was released on September 17, 1991, in the United States on Caroline Records and on City Slang in Europe. The album's lead single, "Teenage Whore", was released in Europe on September 9, and entered the UK Indie Chart's Top 10 at number one on September 28, 1991, beating out "Heaven Sent An Angel" by Revolver, "Let It Slide" by Mudhoney, and "Love to Hate You" by Erasure, among others. On The Chart Show on Channel 4, the song's title was censored with ellipsis in place of the word "whore". The single's success in the United Kingdom led the band to perform a twelve-date tour of the country supporting Mudhoney. The subsequent success of both the album, single, and tour saw Hole embark on a further three tours of the United States, Germany and Western Europe in the latter half of 1991, playing again with Mudhoney, as well as alternative rock acts Daisy Chainsaw and Therapy?. While the album gained traction in the United Kingdom, it failed to chart in the United States despite extensive touring, though it was known to be outselling Nirvana's output before the band's release of Nevermind the following week.

On December 19, 1991, the band played their final show of the tour in Hollywood at the Whisky a Go Go opening for The Smashing Pumpkins, which ended with Love smashing her guitar headstock onstage at the end of their set after lukewarm reception from the audience. Los Angeles Times journalist David Cromelin noted in his review of the concert:

Smashing Pumpkins' singer-guitarist Billy Corgan referred to himself as "a frustrated Midwestern youth" at the Whisky on Tuesday ... Smashing Pumpkins was preceded by smashing guitars, courtesy of Hole. The tortured, transfixing L.A. group's pairing with the headliners should have made this a bill to remember, but the audience was primed for Pumpkin and didn't take to Courtney Love's powerful howls of anguish. Hole ended its set in a tantrum, as Love ordered the band to halt and hurled her guitar to the ground. Guitarist Eric Erlandson finished things off by demolishing his instrument with a few impressive swings. Frustrated Midwestern youth, meet frustrated California youth.

The same evening, Joe Cole, a roadie and friend of the band, filmed their live set with Henry Rollins of Black Flag. After the show, while en route to his Venice Beach apartment with Rollins, Cole was murdered in an armed robbery. Hole would dedicate their second record, Live Through This, to Cole in 1994.

After Hole's 1991 tour concluded, a music video for the track "Garbadge Man" was released, though the album's only single, "Teenage Whore", did not receive a music video. The video is fairly abstract and a reflection of Hole's no wave influence at the time, with shots of Love and other band members in a car interspersed with shots of them performing outside the window. According to Love, she tracked down original rolls of radiographic medical film from Denver, Colorado, that had been used in the Vietnam War, which the music video was then shot on, giving the images an X-ray-like appearance. The video was shown on MTV's 120 Minutes in 1992 during an interview with Love and Kim Gordon, and was broadcast again on the show in 1994 and 1995 but was never as popular as the band's later videos. For the music video, an alternate mix of the song by Gordon was used to eliminate profanity.

The album was released on CD and cassette in the United States, but received a release on vinyl LP throughout Europe by City Slang, based in Berlin, Germany. The first 3,000 pressings of the LP featured blue vinyl, while the following pressings were in standard black.

== Critical reception ==
=== Contemporaneous ===
Professional ratings
Review scores
Source	Rating
AllMusic	2.5/5 stars
Christgau's Consumer Guide	(3-star Honorable Mention)
Los Angeles Times	3/4 stars
NME	9/10
PopMatters	8/10
Q	3/5 stars
The Rolling Stone Album Guide	2/5 stars
Select	4/5
Spin Alternative Record Guide	8/10
The Stranger	4/4 stars

Pretty on the Inside was received with acclaim by many British and American alternative press. In a review by Edwin Pouncey for NME, the album was positively compared to Patti Smith's Horses, as well as the debut albums of the Ramones, Television, and New York Dolls, and was branded as being in "a class of its own", while Elizabeth Wurtzel wrote in The New Yorker that "Pretty on the Inside is such a cacophony ... very few people are likely to get through it once, let alone give it the repeated listenings it needs for you to discover that it's probably the most compelling album to have been released in 1991."

Simon Reynolds of The New York Times described the album as "a cauldron of negativity... [the band] grind[s] out torturous sound, vaguely redolent of Black Sabbath... Ms. Love's songs explore the full spectrum of female emotions, from vulnerability to rage. The songs are fueled by adolescent traumas, feelings of disgust about the body, passionate friendships with women and the desire to escape domesticity. Her lyrical style could be described as emotional nudism." Jonathan Gold of the Los Angeles Times similarly noted that the lyrics present "a terrifying emotional landscape, closer to Kathy Acker novels than to anything you might think of as pop" and praised Love's vocals as "astonishingly expressive" and ranging from "howling rage to the sort of sardonic sneer associated with the Fall’s Mark Smith... Whether it wanted one or not, the decade finally has an equivalent of Patti Smith’s Horses. Play it loud. Pretty on the Inside is about as pretty as a flayed wound." Gold later commented: "If Pretty on the Inside were a horror movie, it would be all the parts that you have to look at through your fingers." LA Weekly's Lorraine Ali echoed a similar sentiment about the album's harsh nature, describing it as a "slithering nest of ugly thoughts and horrific admissions too intriguing to pass up."

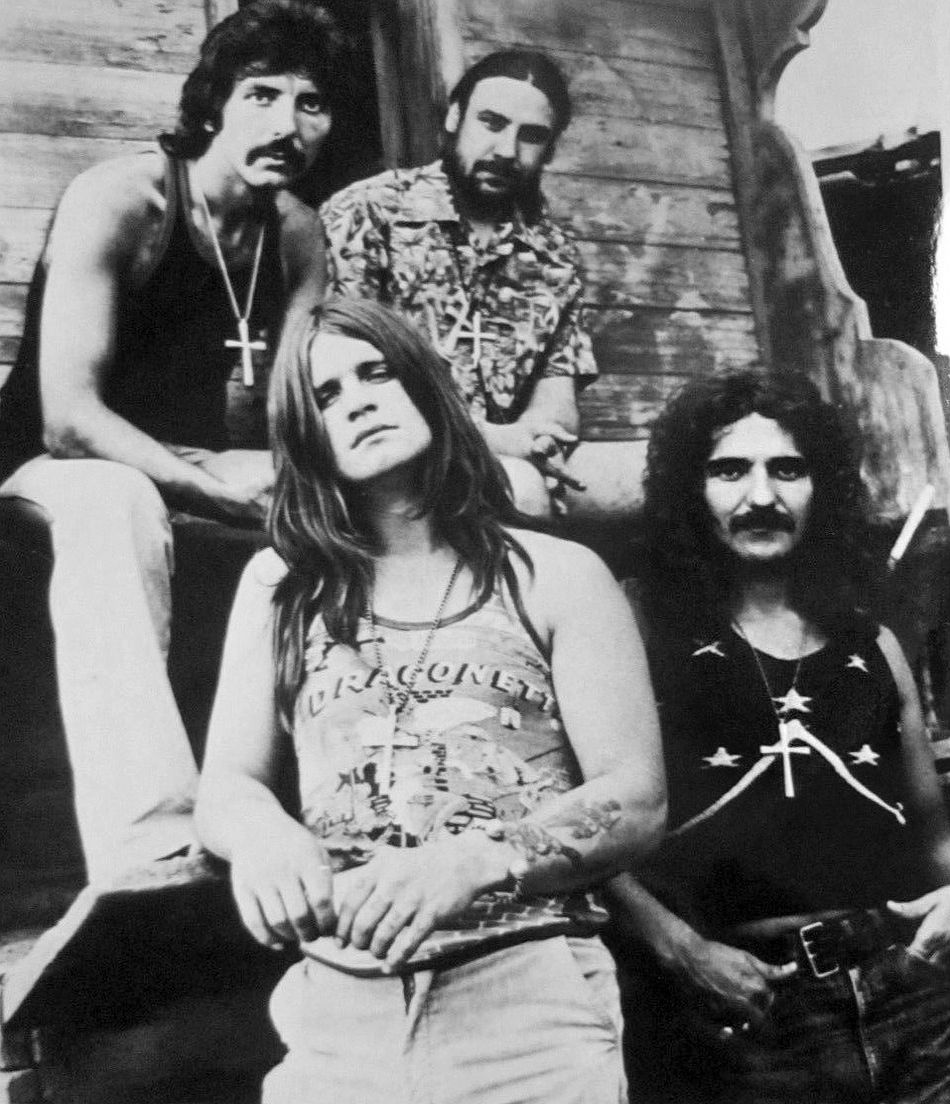
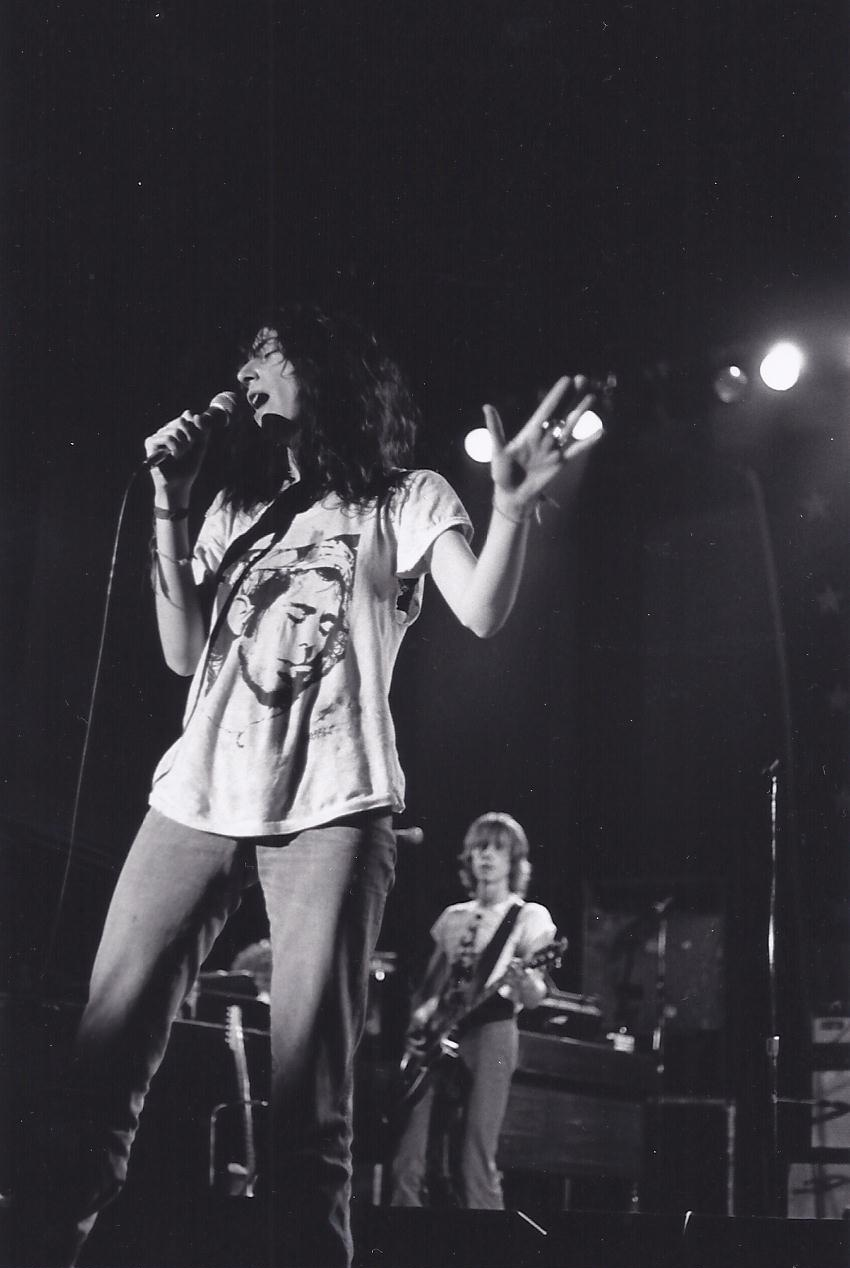
Critics compared the album to the works of various artists, ranging from Black Sabbath to Patti Smith

Spin's Daisy von Furth noted a lyrical preoccupation with "the repulsive aspects of L.A.— superficiality, sexism, violence, and drugs. Love is the embodiment of what drives the band: the dichotomy of pretty/ugly ... The pretty/ugly dynamic also comes across in Hole's music ... a song like "Teenage Whore" at first comes across like a ranting noisy rage, but underneath is a surprisingly lush melody." Spin ranked it among the 20 best albums of the year in December 1991. Melody Maker columnist Sharon O'Connell wrote that the album was "the very best bit of fucked-up rock 'n' roll [I've heard] all year," while Deborah Frost of The Village Voice called it "genre-defying", taking note of Love's reputation on the album as "the girl who won't shut up ... She is all the things that she should not be, and she shoves it, raw, right in your face." Hannah Levin of the Seattle publication The Stranger praised the album's production by Gordon and Fleming, stating that "despite Pretty on the Inside's reputation as an unhinged, raw-sounding debut, a great deal of professional calculation went into putting this record together." Levin also applauded Love's lyrics, writing that the album "judiciously toes the line between the evasively obtuse and overtly obscene".

In a 1994 article, Rolling Stone journalist David Fricke called the album "gloriously assaultive" and "a classic of sex-mad self-laceration, hypershred guitars and full-moon bawling ... in particular the spectacular goring of Joni Mitchell's "Both Sides, Now" (aka "Clouds") at the end of the record. You don't really know the solitary despair at the core of that song until you've heard Love's embittered delivery of the last two lines — "It's life's illusions I recall / I really don't know life at all" — over guitarist Eric Erlandson's fading squall." In 1995, Alternative Press magazine ranked the album at No. 74 in their "Top 99 Of '85–'95" list, noting that "Love works in extremes and wears that scarlet letter when she feels like it, and when she doesn't she rips it off, never neglecting melody and language as the real medium for her message." Wendy Brandes of CNN, while reviewing Hole's third release, Celebrity Skin, in 1998, described Pretty on the Inside as "the musical equivalent of scrubbing one's eardrums with sandpaper".

=== Retrospective ===
Stephen Thomas Erlewine gave the album a notably mixed review at AllMusic, calling the album "brutally uncompromising", and further noting: "The jagged white noise and buzzing guitars articulate Courtney Love's pent-up rage as well as her lyrics, and while that might make the album difficult to absorb in one sitting, it also makes it a singular achievement." Music historian Andrew Earles referred to the album as "brick-heavy...a crushing mix of Mudhoney at its finest, sludge-metal, Sonic Youth, and Love's terrifying but also moving vocal performance." PopMatters reviewed the album in 2009, noting that it has "bold musical splendour on display" that "[leaves one feeling] nothing short of gobsmacked".

In a 2015 retrospective assessment, Spin noted the album's overt noise rock influences, writing that it "played like a AmRep release".

== Legacy ==
Pretty on the Inside has had an influence on multiple alternative rock acts, being specifically mentioned by Spinnerette/The Distillers frontwoman Brody Dalle in an interview as a seminal album in the development of her music. British rock band Nine Black Alps also noted the album as a major influence on their third release, Locked Out from the Inside (2009), and indie singer-songwriter Scout Niblett cited it as a major influence on her: "For me, the thing that I loved about them and her [Courtney Love] was the anger, and aggressiveness, along with the tender side", said Niblett. "That was something I hadn't seen before in a woman playing music. That was hugely influential and really inspiring. Women up 'til then were kind of one-dimensional, twee, sweet, ethereal, and that annoys the shit out of me."

Contemporarily, the album has also gained a cult following among rock and punk music fans.

The Trouser Press Guide to '90s Rock called the album a "surly milkshake of broken rock shards ... from the artistic misspellings of song titles to the lyric collage on the inner sleeve and the abrasive, abstract guitar noises on the songs, Pretty on the Inside reveals the band's fascination with the New York no wave art and music scene of the '80s." According to Billboard, the album had sold 27,000 copies by 1994, when the band released their wildly popular follow-up album, Live Through This.

In more recent years, frontwoman Love stated that the album contains "nothing melodic". In a 2011 interview for Hit So Hard (2011), a documentary on later Hole drummer Patty Schemel, Love referred to Pretty on the Inside as "unlistenable", going on to say: "That record was a calling card for rock critics and hardcorers, [saying] 'This is what I do, and I am not going to back down from it. I am announcing my persona as a cunt. Thank you very much.'" Love's attitude toward the album shifted in the subsequent years, as she commented in 2021: "I've really put that record down as being beneath my songwriting capacity, but I really don't put it down anymore at all, because it was so transformative."

In October 2016, lead guitarist Eric Erlandson oversaw an orchestral live performance of the entire album in Los Angeles, entitled Pretty Looking Back.

== Track listing ==
All tracks are written by Hole, except where noted.

No.	Title	Writer(s)	Note(s)	Length
1.	"Teenage Whore"			2:57
2.	"Babydoll"			4:59
3.	"Garbadge Man"			3:19
4.	"Sassy"			1:43
5.	"Good Sister / Bad Sister"			5:47
6.	"Mrs. Jones"			5:25
7.	"Berry"			2:46
8.	"Loaded"			4:19
9.	"Starbelly"	Neil Young (uncredited: "Cinnamon Girl" instrumental; arrangements by Hole)	Samples "Rhiannon" by Fleetwood Mac, and "Best Sunday Dress" by Pagan Babies	1:46
10.	"Pretty on the Inside"			1:27
11.	"Clouds"	Joni Mitchell	Additional lyrics by Courtney Love (Note: Hole's rendition of the track features several lyrics that are altered from Mitchell's original composition. Note that the original US CD pressing by Caroline Records also merges "Pretty on the Inside" and "Clouds" as a single track, resulting in a 10-track listing rather than 11.)	3:58
Total length:				38:26

== Reissues ==
In June 2011, Plain Recordings, an independent American record label specializing in cult album re-issues, announced that a 180 gram vinyl re-release of Pretty on the Inside was being introduced to their catalogue; it was released on August 2, 2011. On October 20, 2017, a second reissue of the LP was released by Plain Recordings, pressed on pink vinyl.

== Personnel ==
All personnel credits adapted from the album's liner notes.

Hole

- Courtney Love – vocals, rhythm guitar
- Eric Erlandson – lead guitar
- Jill Emery – bass guitar
- Caroline Rue – drums, percussion

Technical personnel

- Kim Gordon – producer
- Don Fleming – producer
- Brian Foxworthy – engineer

Art personnel

- Courtney Love – art direction
- Vicki Berndt – photography (front cover)
- Pizz – typography
- Jill Emery – painting (back cover)

== Charts ==
Chart performance for Pretty on the Inside
Chart (1991)	Peak position
UK Albums (Official Charts)	59
UK Indie Albums (Music Week)	7

== Sources ==
- Anderson, Kyle (2007). Accidental Revolution: The Story of Grunge. New York City, New York: St. Martin's Griffin. ISBN 978-0-312-35819-8.
- Bogdanov, Vladimir; Woodstra, Chris; Erlewine, Stephen Thomas (2002). All Music Guide to Rock: The Definitive Guide to Rock, Pop, and Soul. New York City, New York: Backbeat Books. ISBN 978-0-87930-653-3.
- Brite, Poppy Z. (1998). Courtney Love: The Real Story. Touchstone. ISBN 0-684-84800-7.
- Browne, David (2009). Goodbye 20th Century: A Biography of Sonic Youth. Da Capo Press. ISBN 978-0-306-81515-7.
- Burns, Lori; Lafrance, Mélisse (2002). Disruptive Divas: Feminism, Identity & Popular Music. New York City, New York: Taylor & Francis, Routledge. ISBN 978-0-8153-3554-2.
- Carson, Mina Julia; Lewis, Lisa; Shaw, Susan M., eds. (2004). Girls Rock!: Fifty Years of Women Making Music. Lexington, Kentucky: The University Press of Kentucky. ISBN 978-0-8131-2310-3.
- Chick, Stevie (2008). Psychic Confusion: The Sonic Youth Story. New York City, New York: Omnibus Press. ISBN 978-0-825-63606-6.
- Chick, Stevie (2011). Spray Paint the Walls: The Story of Black Flag. PM Press. ISBN 978-1-60486-418-2.
- Christgau, Robert (2000). "Hole: Pretty on the Inside". Christgau's Consumer Guide: Albums of the '90s. New York City, New York: St. Martin's Griffin. ISBN 0-312-24560-2.
- Crawford, Anwen (2014). Hole's Live Through This. 33 1/3. New York City, New York: Bloomsbury USA. ISBN 978-1-623-56377-6.
- Diehl, Matt (2007). My So-Called Punk: How Neo-Punk Stage-Dived into the Mainstream. New York City, New York: St. Martin's Griffin. ISBN 978-0-312-33781-0.
- Earles, Andrew (2014). Gimme Indie Rock: 500 Essential American Underground Rock Albums, 1981–1996. Minneapolis, Minnesota: Voyageur Press. ISBN 978-0-760-34648-8.
- Erlandson, Eric (2012). Letters to Kurt. New York City, New York: Akashic Books. ISBN 978-1-61775-083-0.
- Love, Courtney (2006). Dirty Blonde: The Diaries of Courtney Love. New York City, New York: Picador. ISBN 0-86547-959-3.
- Powers, Ann (1995). "Hole". In Weisbard, Eric; Marks, Craig (eds.). Spin Alternative Record Guide. New York City, New York: Vintage Books. ISBN 0-679-75574-8.
- Raha, Maria (2005). Cinderella's Big Score: Women of the Punk and Indie Underground. Emeryville, California: Seal Press. ISBN 978-1-580-05116-3.
- Reisfeld, Randi (1996). This Is the Sound: The Best of Alternative Rock. New York City, New York: Simon & Schuster. ISBN 978-0-68980-6-704.
- Robbins, Ira A. (1997). The Trouser Press Guide to '90s Rock. New York City, New York: Simon & Schuster. ISBN 978-0-684-81437-7.
- Rue, Carolyn (December 22, 2022). "Carolyn Rue Interviewed" (Interview). Interviewed by Mikayla Beyer – via YouTube.
- Sheffield, Rob (2004). "Hole". In Brackett, Nathan; Hoard, Christian (eds.). The New Rolling Stone Album Guide (4th ed.). New York City, New York: Simon & Schuster. ISBN 0-7432-0169-8.
- Thompson, Dave (2000). Alternative Rock. New York City, New York: Backbeat Books. ISBN 978-0-87930-607-6.
