= Rudy Rotta =

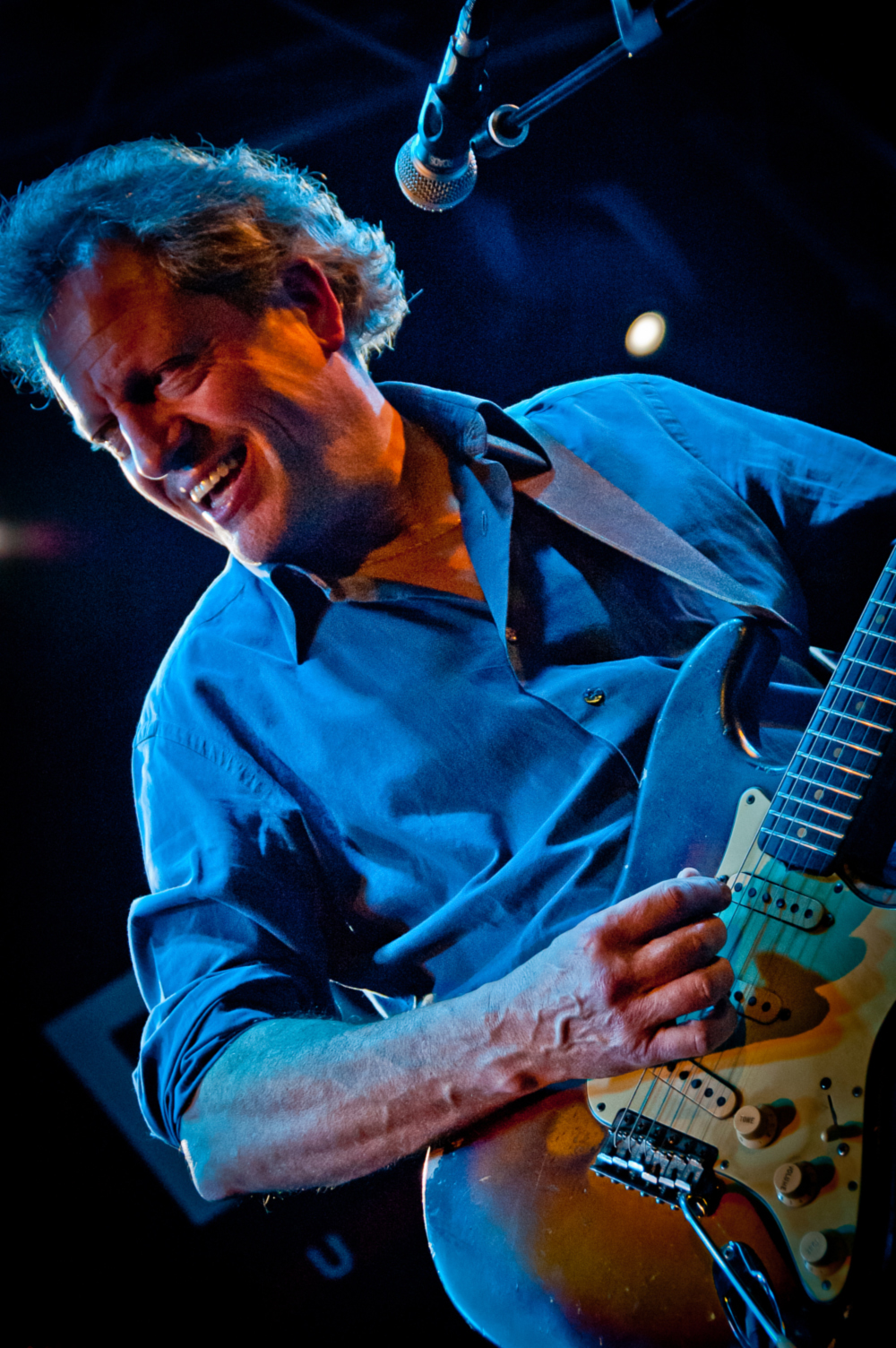
- Rotta performing at Xroads, 6 January 2011

Background information
- Born: 14 October 1950; Villadossola, Italy
- Origin: Italy
- Died: 3 July 2017 (aged 66) Verona, Italy
- Genres: Blues rock
- Occupation: Musician
- Instruments: Guitar, vocals
- Website: Rudyrotta.com

Rudy Rotta (Villadossola, 14 October 1950 – Verona, 3 July 2017) was a Swiss-Italian blues guitarist and vocalist.

== Biography ==
Rodolfo "Rudy" Rotta was born in Villadossola, Italy, in 1950, and grew up in Lucerne, Switzerland where his family emigrated. He started playing guitar and performing in Switzerland at the age of 14, but eventually returned to Verona, where he founded the Rudy's Blues Band. Over his career, he played with a number of well-known blues artists including Brian Auger, John Mayall, Robben Ford and Peter Green. Rotta died on 3 July 2017 in Verona after an illness.

== Albums – LP, CD e DVD ==
- 1988 – Real Live (LP, LMJ Vinyl)
- 1989 – Reason to Live (LP & CD, RiverNile Records / Ala Bianca Records / Emi / Emi Toshiba)
- 1991 – Blues Greatest Hits feat. Karen Carroll (LP & CD, Ornament / Hot Fox Records / In-Akustik) – rec. in Chicago
- 1993 – Diabolic Live (CD, Hot Fox Records / In-Akustik)
- 1995 – So di Blues (CD, Rossodisera Records / Mint Records / Sony)
- 1997 – Live in Kansas City (CD, Acoustic Music Records / Azzurra Music) rec. in Kansas City
- 1995 – Loner and Goner (CD, Ala Bianca Benelux / Emi)
- 1999 – Blurred (CD, Acoustic Music Records)
- 2001 – The Beatles in Blues (CD, Azzurra Music / EuroTrend / Pepper Cake / Zyx)
- 2004 – Some of my favorite songs (CD, Pepper Cake / Zyx)
- 2005 – Captured live with Brian Auger (CD, Pepper Cake / Zyx)
- 2006 – Winds of Louisiana (CD, Pepper Cake / Zyx) rec. in New Orleans
- 2008 – Live at B&W Rhythm'n'Blues Festival (DVD, Pepper Cake / Zyx)
- 2009 – Blue Inside (CD, Pepper Cake / Zyx)
- 2011 – La Musica, La Mia Vita (CD, Azzurra Music)
- 2011 – Me, My Music and My Life (2CD, Pepper Cake / Zyx)
- 2014 – The Beatles vs The Rolling Stones (CD, Slang Records /Pepper Cake / Zyx)
- 2015 – Rudy Rotta Box (2CD+DVD, Pepper Cake / Zyx)
- 2017 – Il Blues di Rudy Rotta (CD, Azzurra Music)
- 2017 – Volo sul Mondo (CD, Pepper Cake / Zyx / A-Z Blues)
- 2019 – Now And Then...and Forever (CD, Pepper Cake / Zyx / A-Z Blues)
- 2024 – Live in Oxford, England, 1999 (VIDEO, BluesArchive / A-Z Press)
