= Tiger Walk (album) =

Studio album by Robben Ford
- Released: 1997
- Studios: Avatar Studios (New York City, New York); A&M Studios and The Sound Factory (Hollywood, California)
- Genre: Blues
- Length: 49:36
- Label: Blue Thumb
- Producers: Robben Ford; Niko Bolas

Robben Ford chronology
Blues Connotation (1996)	Tiger Walk (1997)	The Authorized Bootleg (1998)

Professional ratings
Review scores
Source	Rating
Allmusic	4/5 stars
The Penguin Guide to Blues Recordings	3/4 stars

Tiger Walk is an album by Robben Ford. "In the Beginning" was nominated for a 1998 Grammy Award for Best Rock Instrumental Performance.

== Track listing ==
All tracks composed by Robben Ford; except where indicated.

1. "In the Beginning" – 5:13
2. "Ghosts" – 5:27
3. "Freedom" – 6:43
4. "Red Lady w/Cello" – 5:00
5. "Oasis" – 5:10
6. "Just Like It Is" – 3:07
7. "I Can't Stand the Rain" (Don Bryant, Bernard Miller, Ann Peebles) – 3:31
8. "The Champ" – 5:12
9. "Tiger Walk" – 5:19
10. "Comin' Up" – 4:54
11. "Don't Let the Sun Catch You Crying" (hidden track) – 8:39
12. "Chevrolet" (hidden track) – 5:47

== Personnel ==
- Robben Ford – guitars
- Bernie Worrell – organ, clavinet
- Charley Drayton – bass guitars
- Steve Jordan – drums, percussion

Guest musicians

- Russell Ferrante – acoustic piano (8)
- Benmont Tench – organ (8)
- Lenny Castro – percussion (1, 8)
- Ronnie Cuber – baritone saxophone (2, 7)
- Bob Malach – tenor saxophone (2, 4, 7)

== Production ==
- Chick Corea – executive producer
- Ron Moss – executive producer
- Robben Ford – producer
- Niko Bolas – producer, mixing
- Chad Bamford – assistant engineer
- Dave Reed – assistant engineer
- Rory Romano – assistant engineer
- Joe Zook – assistant engineer
- Dave Collins – mastering at A&M Mastering Studios (Hollywood, California)
- Jeffrey Rivera – technical assistance
- Artie Smith – technical assistance
- Hollis King – art direction
- Isabelle Wong – design
- Guy Webster – photography
- db Management – management
