= The Inside Story (album) =

Studio album by Robben Ford
- Released: May 1979
- Recorded: February 1979
- Studio: Cherokee, Hollywood
- Genre: Jazz, rock
- Length: 43:32
- Label: Elektra
- Producer: Steve Cropper

Robben Ford chronology
Jimmy Witherspoon & Robben Ford Live (1976)	The Inside Story (1979)	Love's a Heartache (1983)

The Inside Story is a 1979 studio album by Robben Ford. Ford supported the album with a North American tour.

== Critical reception ==
Professional ratings
Review scores
Source	Rating
AllMusic	2/5 stars

The Lincoln Journal Star called the album "enjoyable and distinctive," writing that it rises above "'studio player' anonymity." The Spokesman-Review called Ford "a virtuoso electric guitarist with his feet nicely placed in both the jazz and rock camps."

== Track listing ==
All songs written by Robben Ford except where noted

1. "Magic Sam" – 5:53
2. "For the One I Love" – 4:22
3. "North Carolina" – 4:38
4. "There's No One Else" (Ford, Russell Ferrante) – 6:52
5. "The Inside Story" (Ford, Russell Ferrante) – 5:30
6. "Need Somebody" (Gordon Edwards, Richard Tee)
7. "Far Away" – 5:40
8. "Tee Time for Eric" – 5:09

== Personnel ==
- Robben Ford – guitar, vocals; Roland electric piano on "Need Somebody"
- Alan Rubin – trumpet
- Tom Malone – trombone, baritone saxophone
- Lou Marini – alto saxophone, tenor saxophone, horn arrangements
- Russell Ferrante – synthesizer, ARP Odyssey and Moog synthesizer programming
- Steve Perry a.k.a. Stephen Sea – synthesizer
- Mark Ford – harmonica
- Jimmy Haslip – bass guitar
- Ricky Lawson – drums, percussion
- Vander "Starz" Lockett – percussion
- Tommy Vig – percussion

Technical

- Larry Redhon - engineer
- Ron Coro, Johnny Lee - art direction
- Gary Heery - photography
