= Retard Girl =

Debut single by Hole

- First pressing cover art

Single by Hole
- B-side: "Phonebill Song"; "Johnnie's in the Bathroom"
- Released: July 1990
- Recorded: March 17, 1990
- Studio: Rudy's Rising Star (Los Angeles, California)
- Genre: Noise rock; no wave; hardcore punk
- Length: 4:47
- Label: Sympathy for the Record Industry
- Songwriter: Courtney Love
- Producers: James Moreland; Eric Erlandson

Hole singles chronology
"Retard Girl" (1990)	"Dicknail" (1991)

"Retard Girl" is the debut single by the American alternative rock band Hole, written by vocalist and guitarist Courtney Love, and released in July 1990 by Sympathy for the Record Industry. Recorded in March 1990, the single was produced by Love's then-husband, James Moreland. Love wrote the song the same night after she escaped a violent sexual assault attempt.

The lyrics narrate a girl being bullied on a school playground, also making direct references to Horace's Odes, including the Latin verse "velut inter ignis luna minors", which is also inscribed on the back of the single's cover art.

== Background ==
Courtney Love wrote "Retard Girl" prior to, or within the first few weeks of, Hole's formation as the song was performed at Hole's second live performance in 1989. According to Love, she wrote the song after escaping a sexual assault attempt while she was working as an erotic dancer at Jumbo's Clown Room in Los Angeles:

After one of my shifts, my friend invited me to this guy’s house. I said no to a drink and then I was in handcuffs, and I was on the floor and there was a video camera on. I screamed my mother fucking ass off. I was disposable. Nobody would’ve missed me. The one shoe, the ripped clothes. I get into my little apartment and this is the magic part, I plugged in the fucking guitar and I wrote "Retard Girl."

== Recording ==
"Retard Girl" was recorded at the band's first studio session on March 17, 1990, at Rudy's Rising Star in Los Angeles. The band was given $500, by Sympathy for the Record Industry's president Long Gone John, to record the session, which was initially meant to only include the song, however, others were recorded alongside it, including "Turpentine", "Phonebill Song" and "Johnnie's in the Bathroom." "Retard Girl" along with the latter songs were released in full form on The First Session EP in 1997. The session was produced by Love's then-husband, James Moreland, with additional production by lead guitarist Eric Erlandson.

== Composition ==
Musically, the song was performed in drop D tuning and follows a simple structure; opening with a bass line, progressing to distorted guitars and featuring aggressive vocals. The composition highlights the band's initial no wave and punk rock-influenced sound.

The lyrics in the song tell a story of a girl being ridiculed on the school playground. The line "As shines the moon among the lesser fires" (Latin: velut inter ignis luna minors) in the second verse of the song is a direct reference to Roman poet Horace, extracted from Odes, a book of Latin lyric poems composed in 23 BC. (Note: "As shines the moon among the lesser fires" is an English translation of a lyric (Latin: velut inter ignis luna minors) from Horace's Book I of Odes, written c. 23 BC.)

Love revealed the meaning of "Retard Girl" in a 1990 interview with Flipside, a Los Angeles fanzine: "'Retard Girl', that's our single. It's about getting picked on in school, anyone who's ever been picked on in a big way, or a small way. I just got this vibe one day about how when I was in school I was really shy and sort of picked on and I swore that I would never pick on people who were picked on."

All releases of the single list the songwriting credits collectively as Hole, however BMI's website shows "Retard Girl" as written by Love alone.

=== B-sides ===
The single also featured two b-sides, "Phonebill Song" and "Johnnie's in the Bathroom". "Johnnie's in the Bathroom" is a noise track featuring Courtney Love reading diary entries to a distorted guitar playing the instrumentals of "Tradition", and later, "If I Were a Rich Man" from Fiddler on the Roof. (Note: The opening guitar in "Johnnie's in the Bathroom" from 0:00 to 0:40 is identical to "Tradition", while the closing guitar number is a rendition of "If I Were a Rich Man" (see the 101 Strings Orchestra renditions of the Fiddler on the Roof numbers for auditory comparison).) Additionally, the track is accompanied by unidentified lounge music fading in and out of the mix, as well as what seems to be a recorded conversation between Love and a phone sex operator.

"Phonebill Song" is a punk-style track composed of three chords, and seems to be a tongue-in-cheek reference to Love spending too much time talking on the telephone, with lyrics like "Before I go to sleep / Get it away from me / Gotta run the phonebill up."

== Packaging and artwork ==
The single was released by Sympathy for the Record Industry in 1990 on 7" only. The first pressing was on white vinyl with inserts, followed by blue and pink versions later on. Generic black vinyl versions were also issued later with a golden color scheme on the front cover. Several different versions of the front cover were produced in differing color schemes, which features a picture of a young woman hanging upside down from a tree limb. The woman in the photograph is Kat Bjelland of Babes In Toyland, a longtime friend and bandmate of Love, and the photo was taken in guitarist Eric Erlandson's backyard.

The back cover also features the Latin inscription "velut inter ignis luna minors", a verse from Horace referenced in the song.

== Reception ==
Emily Mackay of NME called "Retard Girl" a "perfect intro [to the band's] slow, tarry, Mudhoney-ish early sound. Starting off with ominous bass notes before a wall of slick noise hits, it circles round Courtney's tradition obsessions of abject social outcasts and angry disgust." Scott Morrow of LA Weekly described the track as "some of the most unrelenting stuff I've heard in a long time."

Jason Ankeny of AllMusic gave the release five out of ten stars, noting: "Though clearly intended as a profound statement on the intolerance and depravity of humankind, "Retard Girl" is little more than a catalog of ugly childhood behaviors and impulses that mistakes shock value for substance. Eric Erlandson's lumpy, lurching guitar possesses none of the raw lyricism evidenced on subsequent Hole records, but Courtney Love's ear-splitting screech does achieve some kind of catharsis."

Of the b-sides featured on the "Retard Girl" single, Ankeny called "Phonebill Song" "tuneless" and likened "Johnnie's in the Bathroom" to "a tedious exercise merging spoken word narrative, tape montage, and pig-squealing guitar feedback."

== Track listing ==
US 7" single (SFTRI 53)

1. "Retard Girl" (Courtney Love) – 4:47
2. "Phonebill Song" (Love, Eric Erlandson) – 1:48
3. "Johnnie's in the Bathroom" (Love, Erlandson) – 2:17

== Credits and personnel ==
Hole

- Courtney Love – vocals, guitar
- Eric Erlandson – guitar
- Jill Emery – bass
- Caroline Rue – drums, percussion

Technical

- James Moreland – producer, engineer
- Eric Erlandson – producer, engineer
- John Vestman – mixing, mastering

Art direction

- Johnny Siko – front cover photo
- Vickie Berndt – back cover photo

== Sources ==
- Brite, Poppy Z. (December 18, 1998). Courtney Love: The Real Story. New York City, New York: Simon & Schuster. ISBN 978-0-684-84800-6.
- Strong, Martin, ed. (2004). The Great Rock Discography. New York City, New York: Canongate. ISBN 978-1-841-95615-2.
- True, Everett (2009). Nirvana: The Biography. Boston, Massachusetts: Da Capo Press. ISBN 978-0-306-81554-6.
