= A. J. Croce =

American singer-songwriter (born 1971)

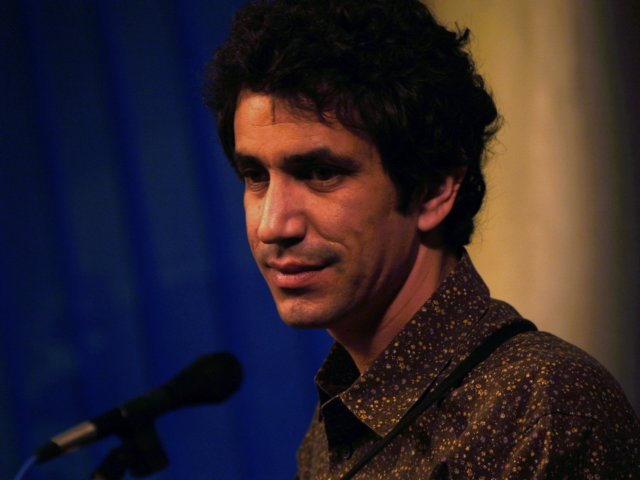
- Croce performing in 2007
- Born: Adrian James Croce; September 28, 1971 (age 55); Bryn Mawr, Pennsylvania, U.S.
- Spouse: Marlo Gordon Croce (m. 1994; died 2018)
- Children: 2
- Parents: Jim Croce (father); Ingrid Croce (mother)
- Musical career
- Genres: Pop, rock, blues, country
- Occupations: Singer, songwriter, musician
- Instruments: Vocals; piano; guitar
- Years active: 1983–present
- Labels: Private Music, Ruf, Compass
- Website: www.ajcrocemusic.com

Adrian James Croce (born September 28, 1971) is an American singer-songwriter. His parents are Ingrid Croce and Jim Croce.

== Biography ==
=== Early life ===
Croce was born in Bryn Mawr, Pennsylvania, on September 28, 1971, the son of singers Jim Croce, who was from an Italian Roman Catholic family but adopted Judaism, and Ingrid Croce, who is Jewish. His father died in a plane crash in September 1973, at age 30, eight days before A.J.'s second birthday. Shortly before his father's death, in the summer of 1973, the family moved to San Diego. When Croce was four years old, he was temporarily blinded by the physical abuse of Ingrid's boyfriend. Croce was hospitalized for six months and was totally blind in both eyes for six years. Croce grew up listening to Ray Charles, Sam Cooke, a lot of soul music, early rock 'n' roll, jazz, and blues. He learned how to play the piano, inspired by Ray Charles and Stevie Wonder. Croce later regained sight in one eye. For junior high, he attended Hebrew school. In 1987, when Croce was 15, the family's house burned down.

=== Career ===
Croce's first paying gig was at age 12, when he was paid $20 to perform 25–30 minutes of cover versions at a bat mitzvah party. Croce played music for a living from the age of 15. By the age of 16, he was performing regularly at San Diego nightclubs as a sideman and band leader.

When Croce was 17, while staying at the house of Arlo Guthrie, he met Mae Boren Axton, who invited him to Nashville to record with Jack Clement.

Ron Goldstein and Peter Baumann of Private Music signed Croce to his first recording contract, at age 19. He recorded two albums for Private Music: his self-titled debut, A.J. Croce, produced by T-Bone Burnett and John Simon; and That's Me in the Bar, produced by Jim Keltner, and featuring Ry Cooder and David Hidalgo.

Croce's third album, Fit to Serve, was recorded in 1998 in Memphis and produced by Jim Gaines, who produced Van Morrison, Carlos Santana, and the Steve Miller Band.

Songs on Transit, released in 2000, were compared to the works of The Beatles, Elvis Costello, and The Posies.

In 2003, Croce launched his own record label, Seedling Records.

Croce's next three albums were self-produced. Adrian James Croce, his only pop-oriented album, won Best Pop album at the 2004 San Diego Music Awards. Croce's 2006 album, Cantos, on his own label, Seedling Records, features Ben Harper. In 2009, Croce's album Cage of Muses was released on Seedling, garnering a 4-star review from Rolling Stone.

In 2012, Croce publicly performed an entire set of his father's songs for the first time.

In 2013, Croce signed with Compass Records and released Twelve Tales. He recorded two songs with each of six producers in five U.S. cities over 12 months, releasing one song per month exclusively on iTunes in 2013. The full album was released in 2014. The album's producers were Jack Clement, Allen Toussaint, Mitchell Froom, Kevin Killen, Tony Berg, and Greg Cohen. Croce co-wrote a few of the songs on Twelve Tales, including one song with Leon Russell.

In 2014, Croce spoke at TEDxLaJolla, an independently produced TED.

Croce's 2017 album, Just Like Medicine, according to ABC News, "sounds like it was crafted with the influence of greats like Van Morrison, Bob Dylan and Elvis Costello in mind".

== Personal life ==
Croce lives in East Nashville, Tennessee. His wife, Marlo Gordon Croce, died in 2018, leaving him a single father to their two children. In interviews, Croce reported that she died of a "rare illness," and "rare and sudden heart virus," while his mother shared on social media that Marlo had died by suicide.

== Discography ==
- A.J. Croce (1993)
- That's Me in the Bar (1995)
- Fit to Serve (1998)
- Transit (2000)
- Adrian James Croce (2004)
- Early On – The American Recordings 1993–1998 (2005)
- Cantos (2006)
- Cage of Muses (2009)
- Twelve Tales (2014)
- Just Like Medicine (2017)
- By Request (2021)
- Heart of the Eternal (2025)
