= Dicknail =

Single by Hole
- B-side: "Burn Black"
- Released: February 28, 1991
- Recorded: November 1990
- Studio: Radio Tokyo (Los Angeles, California, U.S.)
- Genre: Noise rock
- Length: 3:39
- Label: Sub Pop
- Songwriters: Courtney Love; Eric Erlandson
- Producer: Michael James

Hole singles chronology
"Retard Girl" (1990)	"Dicknail" (1991)	"Teenage Whore" (1991)

"Dicknail" is a song by American alternative rock band Hole, written by vocalist/guitarist Courtney Love and lead guitarist Eric Erlandson. The song was released by Sub Pop Records as the band's second single in February 1991 on 7" vinyl. The song was recorded in November 1990 at the band's second studio session, with production by Michael James.

"Dicknail" has been noted for its disturbing lyrics that allude to themes of child molestation, rape and incest. Love referred to the song as an "anti-misogynism anthem". The single's cover artwork features a 12-year-old Love lying naked in a bathtub with the band logo superimposed over the photo.

== Background and recording ==
Love and Erlandson are thought to have written "Dicknail" in 1990. The song's first documented performance was at a concert on September 15, 1990, at The Shamrock, a club in Los Angeles.

The first and only known studio version of "Dicknail" was recorded at the band's second studio session in November 1990 at Radio Tokyo in Los Angeles. The song's eventual b-side, "Burn Black", was also recorded at the session, which was produced by Michael James and mixed by Seattle producer Jack Endino. Later mixes of the song — mixed by Barry Goldberg and Erlandson — were released on Hole's 1997 compilation album, My Body, the Hand Grenade.

== Composition ==
In an interview with the Los Angeles fanzine Flipside in 1990, Love and drummer Caroline Rue revealed the meaning behind the song:

Love: "We just wrote this song called 'Dicknail'. It's about different kinds of, it's an anti-misogynism anthem. It has a verse about rape, it has a verse about incest, it has a verse about... Okay it's a male-bashing song! No, it's not..."

Rue: "It sounds like a rationale for a gang bang sometimes, the excuses..."
Love: "The words to the song are very simple, they're like, you know in rape cases how people say 'she liked it' or 'she was asking for it' or 'look at how she was dressed'. A lot of times in rape cases people don't even go to jail because the woman was wearing a fucking miniskirt!"

Rue: "They're exactly like the witch trials, you have to prove that you are completely, immaculately, virginally pure or else you are asking for it."

The idea of a woman "asking for it" also influenced later work by Hole such as the song "Asking for It" from the band's second album, Live Through This. In this respect, "Dicknail" can be seen to be a forerunner to the song, even though the musical and vocal styles are different, with "Dicknail" being influenced by no wave and punk rock music and "Asking for It" being influenced by more standard alternative rock and powerpop.

In a 1992 interview commenting on the song's overtones of incest and child molestation, Love stated: "The British press [especially] has set me up as someone who lived it, but I think that's really dumb."

All releases of the single list the songwriting credits collectively as Hole, however BMI's website shows that "Dicknail" was written by Courtney Love and Eric Erlandson.

== Release ==
"Dicknail" was originally released on February 28, 1991, on Sub Pop as a 7" single, although Hole had never signed with the label; many of Hole's contemporaries, however, had also released singles through Sub Pop, including Babes in Toyland and Nirvana.

Although "Dicknail" was Hole's only appearance on Sub Pop, it has nevertheless been reissued as a part of several collections of early Sub Pop music such as Revolution Come and Gone and The Birth of Alternative Vol. 1, alongside songs from contemporaries such as Nirvana and The Afghan Whigs. The B-side, "Burn Black," appears on The Birth of Alternative Vol. 2.

=== Reception ===
AllMusic called "Dicknail" "a lumbering, screeching train wreck", adding, "Give Courtney Love credit for tackling the subject of child molestation in such brutal, unflinching detail, but "Dicknail" is so musically abrasive and unpleasant that its message gets lost in translation."

Mike Gunderloy of Factsheet Five gave the single a positive review, calling it: "Gurly rock that makes Madonna look like the cheesecake she really is. Both sides of this single present good, solid riffing with interesting time changes that flows very nicely, despite the appearance of being very damaged rock. If Throwing Muses lived on the west coast, they might have approached this."

== Artwork and packaging ==
First pressings were part of Sub Pop's "Single of the Month" series with grey, light green or pink marble vinyl and wraparound pressings. Later copies were issued with card pressed on green, purple or blue vinyl. The artwork on the front cover of the single features a photograph of a pre-pubescent Courtney Love naked in a bathtub, with the band logo superimposed over it.

== Track listing ==
All songs written by Courtney Love and Eric Erlandson.

US 7" single (SP93)

1. "Dicknail" – 3:39
2. "Burn Black" – 4:56

== Credits and personnel ==
Hole

- Courtney Love – vocals, guitar
- Eric Erlandson – guitar
- Jill Emery – bass
- Caroline Rue – drums, percussion

Production

- Michael James – producer, engineer
- Jack Endino – mixing
