= List of minor planets: 469001–470000 =

The following is a partial list of minor planets, running from minor-planet number 469001 through 470000, inclusive. The primary data for this and other partial lists is based on JPL's "Small-Body Orbital Elements" and data available from the Minor Planet Center. Critical list information is also provided by the MPC, unless otherwise specified from Lowell Observatory. A detailed description of the table's columns and additional sources are given on the main page including a complete list of every page in this series, and a statistical break-up on the dynamical classification of minor planets.

Also see the summary list of all named bodies in numerical and alphabetical order, and the corresponding naming citations for the number range of this particular list. New namings may only be added to this list after official publication, as the preannouncement of names is condemned by the Working Group for Small Bodies Nomenclature of the International Astronomical Union.

Near-Earth obj.	MBA (inner)	MBA (outer)	Centaur
Mars-crosser	MBA (middle)	Jupiter trojan	Trans-Neptunian obj.
Unclassified

== 469001–469100 ==
Designation			Discovery			Properties		Ref
Permanent	Provisional	Named after	Date	Site	Discoverer(s)	Category	Diam.	Ref
469001	2015 AG_{193}	—	June 10, 2011	Mount Lemmon	Mount Lemmon Survey	EOS	2.2 km	MPC · JPL
469002	2015 AJ_{203}	—	October 13, 2004	Anderson Mesa	LONEOS	·	2.0 km	MPC · JPL
469003	2015 AN_{203}	—	October 26, 2013	Catalina	CSS	·	3.2 km	MPC · JPL
469004	2015 AR_{203}	—	December 18, 2009	Catalina	CSS	·	2.1 km	MPC · JPL
469005	2015 AG_{206}	—	November 18, 2006	Mount Lemmon	Mount Lemmon Survey	·	1.3 km	MPC · JPL
469006	2015 AE_{209}	—	February 7, 2002	Socorro	LINEAR	·	2.1 km	MPC · JPL
469007	2015 AC_{219}	—	November 20, 2009	Kitt Peak	Spacewatch	·	3.8 km	MPC · JPL
469008	2015 AW_{221}	—	June 11, 2005	Kitt Peak	Spacewatch	·	1.6 km	MPC · JPL
469009	2015 AO_{222}	—	January 13, 2011	Catalina	CSS	MAR	1.4 km	MPC · JPL
469010	2015 AP_{222}	—	July 30, 2008	Catalina	CSS	·	1.8 km	MPC · JPL
469011	2015 AL_{223}	—	November 24, 2008	Kitt Peak	Spacewatch	EMA	3.6 km	MPC · JPL
469012	2015 AD_{226}	—	October 7, 2007	Mount Lemmon	Mount Lemmon Survey	·	2.9 km	MPC · JPL
469013	2015 AD_{227}	—	October 25, 2008	Kitt Peak	Spacewatch	·	3.9 km	MPC · JPL
469014	2015 AN_{227}	—	November 16, 2003	Kitt Peak	Spacewatch	·	1.4 km	MPC · JPL
469015	2015 AC_{228}	—	March 28, 2011	Mount Lemmon	Mount Lemmon Survey	·	2.2 km	MPC · JPL
469016	2015 AK_{231}	—	November 20, 2000	Socorro	LINEAR	·	780 m	MPC · JPL
469017	2015 AQ_{233}	—	August 10, 2007	Kitt Peak	Spacewatch	EOS	1.8 km	MPC · JPL
469018	2015 AJ_{236}	—	December 3, 2007	Kitt Peak	Spacewatch	·	900 m	MPC · JPL
469019	2015 AU_{238}	—	September 13, 2007	Mount Lemmon	Mount Lemmon Survey	·	2.4 km	MPC · JPL
469020	2015 AS_{239}	—	November 7, 2008	Mount Lemmon	Mount Lemmon Survey	·	3.7 km	MPC · JPL
469021	2015 AY_{240}	—	October 12, 2010	Mount Lemmon	Mount Lemmon Survey	·	610 m	MPC · JPL
469022	2015 AC_{243}	—	October 15, 2007	Mount Lemmon	Mount Lemmon Survey	·	2.7 km	MPC · JPL
469023	2015 AK_{243}	—	November 20, 2008	Kitt Peak	Spacewatch	EOS	1.7 km	MPC · JPL
469024	2015 AG_{244}	—	December 30, 2008	Mount Lemmon	Mount Lemmon Survey	·	2.7 km	MPC · JPL
469025	2015 AU_{244}	—	April 9, 2003	Socorro	LINEAR	·	1.8 km	MPC · JPL
469026	2015 AY_{244}	—	December 29, 2005	Kitt Peak	Spacewatch	·	1.9 km	MPC · JPL
469027	2015 AZ_{244}	—	January 16, 2010	WISE	WISE	·	4.3 km	MPC · JPL
469028	2015 AR_{245}	—	March 1, 2004	Kitt Peak	Spacewatch	V	810 m	MPC · JPL
469029	2015 AN_{247}	—	December 1, 2005	Kitt Peak	Spacewatch	·	1.6 km	MPC · JPL
469030	2015 AP_{248}	—	March 31, 2011	Mount Lemmon	Mount Lemmon Survey	EOS	1.6 km	MPC · JPL
469031	2015 AR_{248}	—	December 8, 2008	Mount Lemmon	Mount Lemmon Survey	·	4.4 km	MPC · JPL
469032	2015 AT_{248}	—	January 21, 1993	Kitt Peak	Spacewatch	MAS	610 m	MPC · JPL
469033	2015 AX_{248}	—	November 6, 2008	Kitt Peak	Spacewatch	·	2.2 km	MPC · JPL
469034	2015 AZ_{248}	—	January 11, 2008	Kitt Peak	Spacewatch	·	980 m	MPC · JPL
469035	2015 AQ_{250}	—	September 7, 2008	Mount Lemmon	Mount Lemmon Survey	·	1.9 km	MPC · JPL
469036	2015 AT_{250}	—	February 17, 2007	Kitt Peak	Spacewatch	MAR	1.1 km	MPC · JPL
469037	2015 AL_{251}	—	December 18, 2003	Kitt Peak	Spacewatch	·	2.3 km	MPC · JPL
469038	2015 AM_{251}	—	April 30, 2008	Mount Lemmon	Mount Lemmon Survey	·	2.4 km	MPC · JPL
469039	2015 AM_{252}	—	December 19, 2007	Kitt Peak	Spacewatch	·	960 m	MPC · JPL
469040	2015 AE_{253}	—	February 26, 2007	Mount Lemmon	Mount Lemmon Survey	·	1.3 km	MPC · JPL
469041	2015 AM_{253}	—	November 7, 2008	Mount Lemmon	Mount Lemmon Survey	·	2.3 km	MPC · JPL
469042	2015 AB_{256}	—	January 8, 2010	Mount Lemmon	Mount Lemmon Survey	EOS	2.1 km	MPC · JPL
469043	2015 AC_{256}	—	January 30, 2011	Kitt Peak	Spacewatch	(5)	1.2 km	MPC · JPL
469044	2015 AB_{258}	—	January 10, 2007	Mount Lemmon	Mount Lemmon Survey	EUN	1.4 km	MPC · JPL
469045	2015 AW_{258}	—	April 17, 2005	Kitt Peak	Spacewatch	·	2.8 km	MPC · JPL
469046	2015 AB_{260}	—	September 27, 2003	Anderson Mesa	LONEOS	·	1.4 km	MPC · JPL
469047	2015 AD_{260}	—	April 4, 2003	Kitt Peak	Spacewatch	·	1.6 km	MPC · JPL
469048	2015 AN_{261}	—	October 3, 2003	Kitt Peak	Spacewatch	·	690 m	MPC · JPL
469049	2015 AL_{263}	—	September 10, 2007	Mount Lemmon	Mount Lemmon Survey	·	2.9 km	MPC · JPL
469050	2015 AN_{263}	—	March 23, 2006	Catalina	CSS	·	2.2 km	MPC · JPL
469051	2015 AR_{263}	—	February 25, 2011	Kitt Peak	Spacewatch	·	2.2 km	MPC · JPL
469052	2015 AV_{264}	—	May 31, 2010	WISE	WISE	·	3.5 km	MPC · JPL
469053	2015 AH_{265}	—	May 25, 2003	Kitt Peak	Spacewatch	·	2.9 km	MPC · JPL
469054	2015 AV_{273}	—	October 8, 2008	Mount Lemmon	Mount Lemmon Survey	·	2.1 km	MPC · JPL
469055	2015 AP_{274}	—	April 1, 2011	Kitt Peak	Spacewatch	HOF	2.7 km	MPC · JPL
469056	2015 AB_{276}	—	November 18, 2009	Kitt Peak	Spacewatch	·	1.6 km	MPC · JPL
469057	2015 AE_{277}	—	October 11, 2007	Kitt Peak	Spacewatch	·	2.7 km	MPC · JPL
469058	2015 AA_{279}	—	May 22, 2003	Kitt Peak	Spacewatch	·	1.6 km	MPC · JPL
469059	2015 AH_{279}	—	February 4, 2010	WISE	WISE	·	2.4 km	MPC · JPL
469060	2015 AO_{279}	—	January 16, 2011	Mount Lemmon	Mount Lemmon Survey	·	1.2 km	MPC · JPL
469061	2015 AP_{279}	—	March 18, 2004	Socorro	LINEAR	LIX	4.2 km	MPC · JPL
469062	2015 AX_{279}	—	December 18, 2007	Mount Lemmon	Mount Lemmon Survey	·	720 m	MPC · JPL
469063	2015 BJ_{5}	—	January 21, 2006	Kitt Peak	Spacewatch	DOR	2.3 km	MPC · JPL
469064	2015 BB_{6}	—	October 23, 2008	Kitt Peak	Spacewatch	·	2.3 km	MPC · JPL
469065	2015 BD_{15}	—	May 1, 2012	Mount Lemmon	Mount Lemmon Survey	(5)	1.1 km	MPC · JPL
469066	2015 BX_{21}	—	April 10, 2010	Kitt Peak	Spacewatch	·	2.6 km	MPC · JPL
469067	2015 BU_{25}	—	March 14, 2010	Mount Lemmon	Mount Lemmon Survey	·	2.0 km	MPC · JPL
469068	2015 BL_{27}	—	August 30, 2005	Kitt Peak	Spacewatch	·	970 m	MPC · JPL
469069	2015 BG_{59}	—	December 10, 2010	Mount Lemmon	Mount Lemmon Survey	·	1.3 km	MPC · JPL
469070	2015 BW_{64}	—	September 30, 2003	Kitt Peak	Spacewatch	·	2.4 km	MPC · JPL
469071	2015 BD_{65}	—	December 31, 2008	Mount Lemmon	Mount Lemmon Survey	EOS	1.8 km	MPC · JPL
469072	2015 BH_{69}	—	October 31, 2006	Mount Lemmon	Mount Lemmon Survey	·	1.4 km	MPC · JPL
469073	2015 BO_{70}	—	October 7, 2010	Socorro	LINEAR	·	660 m	MPC · JPL
469074	2015 BN_{85}	—	September 18, 2003	Kitt Peak	Spacewatch	·	880 m	MPC · JPL
469075	2015 BY_{87}	—	September 23, 2008	Mount Lemmon	Mount Lemmon Survey	AGN	1.2 km	MPC · JPL
469076	2015 BP_{125}	—	April 25, 2007	Mount Lemmon	Mount Lemmon Survey	·	1.4 km	MPC · JPL
469077	2015 BV_{132}	—	January 12, 2010	WISE	WISE	·	3.2 km	MPC · JPL
469078	2015 BR_{156}	—	May 29, 2000	Kitt Peak	Spacewatch	EMA	4.3 km	MPC · JPL
469079	2015 BR_{159}	—	May 11, 2003	Kitt Peak	Spacewatch	·	1.9 km	MPC · JPL
469080	2015 BR_{185}	—	July 29, 2005	Palomar	NEAT	·	1.4 km	MPC · JPL
469081	2015 BT_{242}	—	April 11, 2005	Kitt Peak	Spacewatch	·	830 m	MPC · JPL
469082	2015 BB_{278}	—	February 4, 2006	Kitt Peak	Spacewatch	PAD	1.4 km	MPC · JPL
469083	2015 BA_{285}	—	October 4, 2004	Kitt Peak	Spacewatch	EUN	1.4 km	MPC · JPL
469084	2015 BH_{290}	—	March 12, 2011	Mount Lemmon	Mount Lemmon Survey	·	1.7 km	MPC · JPL
469085	2015 BN_{309}	—	May 22, 2010	Mount Lemmon	Mount Lemmon Survey	·	2.5 km	MPC · JPL
469086	2015 BA_{310}	—	December 4, 2008	Mount Lemmon	Mount Lemmon Survey	EOS	2.0 km	MPC · JPL
469087	2015 BO_{319}	—	November 9, 2013	Mount Lemmon	Mount Lemmon Survey	·	2.6 km	MPC · JPL
469088	2015 BM_{346}	—	April 22, 1998	Kitt Peak	Spacewatch	NEM	2.8 km	MPC · JPL
469089	2015 BZ_{419}	—	June 11, 2010	WISE	WISE	·	3.7 km	MPC · JPL
469090	2015 BO_{430}	—	January 26, 2000	Kitt Peak	Spacewatch	·	2.1 km	MPC · JPL
469091	2015 BC_{454}	—	December 31, 2008	Kitt Peak	Spacewatch	·	2.9 km	MPC · JPL
469092	2015 BL_{455}	—	January 7, 2010	Mount Lemmon	Mount Lemmon Survey	·	1.6 km	MPC · JPL
469093	2015 BJ_{456}	—	March 20, 2010	Mount Lemmon	Mount Lemmon Survey	·	2.4 km	MPC · JPL
469094	2015 BN_{489}	—	January 8, 2006	Mount Lemmon	Mount Lemmon Survey	·	2.0 km	MPC · JPL
469095	2015 CC_{4}	—	November 17, 2007	Catalina	CSS	·	680 m	MPC · JPL
469096	2015 CR_{4}	—	December 26, 1995	Kitt Peak	Spacewatch	·	1.6 km	MPC · JPL
469097	2015 CT_{30}	—	January 27, 2011	Kitt Peak	Spacewatch	(5)	1.3 km	MPC · JPL
469098	2015 CJ_{33}	—	October 15, 2007	Mount Lemmon	Mount Lemmon Survey	·	2.7 km	MPC · JPL
469099	2015 CJ_{40}	—	October 22, 1995	Kitt Peak	Spacewatch	·	2.0 km	MPC · JPL
469100	2015 CO_{42}	—	September 14, 2007	Mount Lemmon	Mount Lemmon Survey	EOS	1.8 km	MPC · JPL

== 469101–469200 ==
back to top

Designation			Discovery			Properties		Ref
Permanent	Provisional	Named after	Date	Site	Discoverer(s)	Category	Diam.	Ref
469101	2015 CT_{48}	—	June 11, 2004	Kitt Peak	Spacewatch	NYS	1.3 km	MPC · JPL
469102	2015 CV_{48}	—	February 7, 1999	Kitt Peak	Spacewatch	EOS	2.3 km	MPC · JPL
469103	2015 CW_{53}	—	November 7, 2007	Catalina	CSS	·	3.7 km	MPC · JPL
469104	2015 CJ_{60}	—	March 16, 2005	Catalina	CSS	·	2.7 km	MPC · JPL
469105	2015 DH_{10}	—	August 28, 2006	Catalina	CSS	TIR	2.9 km	MPC · JPL
469106	2015 DV_{16}	—	October 16, 2003	Kitt Peak	Spacewatch	·	2.2 km	MPC · JPL
469107	2015 DW_{24}	—	March 26, 2007	Mount Lemmon	Mount Lemmon Survey	·	1.8 km	MPC · JPL
469108	2015 DY_{25}	—	January 21, 2002	Kitt Peak	Spacewatch	·	1.3 km	MPC · JPL
469109	2015 DB_{43}	—	June 3, 2011	Mount Lemmon	Mount Lemmon Survey	EOS	1.8 km	MPC · JPL
469110	2015 DF_{43}	—	June 11, 2004	Kitt Peak	Spacewatch	·	1.4 km	MPC · JPL
469111	2015 DG_{48}	—	September 23, 2008	Mount Lemmon	Mount Lemmon Survey	·	2.0 km	MPC · JPL
469112	2015 DU_{82}	—	February 9, 2005	Kitt Peak	Spacewatch	KOR	1.8 km	MPC · JPL
469113	2015 DZ_{100}	—	April 4, 2005	Catalina	CSS	EOS	2.3 km	MPC · JPL
469114	2015 DC_{109}	—	March 16, 2005	Catalina	CSS	·	800 m	MPC · JPL
469115	2015 DB_{117}	—	May 13, 2005	Kitt Peak	Spacewatch	EOS	2.4 km	MPC · JPL
469116	2015 DY_{124}	—	April 14, 2005	Kitt Peak	Spacewatch	·	2.6 km	MPC · JPL
469117	2015 DU_{145}	—	November 1, 2006	Mount Lemmon	Mount Lemmon Survey	·	1.7 km	MPC · JPL
469118	2015 DP_{150}	—	November 10, 2009	Kitt Peak	Spacewatch	·	1.4 km	MPC · JPL
469119	2015 DY_{173}	—	November 7, 2008	Mount Lemmon	Mount Lemmon Survey	·	2.9 km	MPC · JPL
469120	2015 DQ_{180}	—	March 13, 2005	Catalina	CSS	EOS	2.3 km	MPC · JPL
469121	2015 DM_{186}	—	December 5, 2002	Kitt Peak	Spacewatch	EOS	1.7 km	MPC · JPL
469122	2015 DU_{206}	—	March 19, 2004	Socorro	LINEAR	·	3.0 km	MPC · JPL
469123	2015 DT_{211}	—	December 30, 2008	Mount Lemmon	Mount Lemmon Survey	·	3.9 km	MPC · JPL
469124	2015 DM_{220}	—	May 22, 2006	Kitt Peak	Spacewatch	·	2.8 km	MPC · JPL
469125	2015 EG_{2}	—	September 24, 2008	Mount Lemmon	Mount Lemmon Survey	·	2.6 km	MPC · JPL
469126	2015 EB_{16}	—	October 22, 2008	Mount Lemmon	Mount Lemmon Survey	·	1.9 km	MPC · JPL
469127	2015 EE_{17}	—	December 11, 2004	Kitt Peak	Spacewatch	·	1.8 km	MPC · JPL
469128	2015 EL_{17}	—	July 28, 2007	Mauna Kea	P. A. Wiegert, N. I. Hasan	·	2.1 km	MPC · JPL
469129	2015 ET_{17}	—	January 18, 2008	Kitt Peak	Spacewatch	PHO	890 m	MPC · JPL
469130	2015 EM_{18}	—	March 13, 2005	Kitt Peak	Spacewatch	·	2.3 km	MPC · JPL
469131	2015 EU_{23}	—	February 11, 2000	Kitt Peak	Spacewatch	·	4.9 km	MPC · JPL
469132	2015 EQ_{30}	—	September 18, 2003	Anderson Mesa	LONEOS	HOF	3.0 km	MPC · JPL
469133	2015 EK_{59}	—	February 6, 2006	Mount Lemmon	Mount Lemmon Survey	ADE	2.2 km	MPC · JPL
469134	2015 EJ_{62}	—	February 17, 2004	Kitt Peak	Spacewatch	EOS	2.7 km	MPC · JPL
469135	2015 EE_{65}	—	June 5, 2000	Kitt Peak	Spacewatch	·	2.8 km	MPC · JPL
469136	2015 FO_{45}	—	April 8, 2010	Kitt Peak	Spacewatch	·	2.8 km	MPC · JPL
469137	2015 FF_{76}	—	October 2, 2006	Mount Lemmon	Mount Lemmon Survey	VER	2.9 km	MPC · JPL
469138	2015 FL_{96}	—	December 31, 2008	Kitt Peak	Spacewatch	EOS	1.8 km	MPC · JPL
469139	2015 FC_{97}	—	April 18, 2006	Anderson Mesa	LONEOS	DOR	2.7 km	MPC · JPL
469140	2015 FA_{121}	—	February 16, 2010	Kitt Peak	Spacewatch	·	2.4 km	MPC · JPL
469141	2015 FS_{121}	—	January 8, 2010	Kitt Peak	Spacewatch	·	2.5 km	MPC · JPL
469142	2015 FB_{128}	—	January 12, 2010	WISE	WISE	LIX	3.4 km	MPC · JPL
469143	2015 FA_{165}	—	October 9, 2007	Mount Lemmon	Mount Lemmon Survey	·	1.9 km	MPC · JPL
469144	2015 FO_{220}	—	September 4, 2000	Anderson Mesa	LONEOS	·	4.0 km	MPC · JPL
469145	2015 FK_{276}	—	January 31, 2006	Kitt Peak	Spacewatch	·	2.4 km	MPC · JPL
469146	2015 FG_{293}	—	October 17, 2003	Kitt Peak	Spacewatch	·	1.9 km	MPC · JPL
469147	2015 FK_{301}	—	October 20, 2007	Mount Lemmon	Mount Lemmon Survey	EOS	2.2 km	MPC · JPL
469148	2015 FJ_{311}	—	May 9, 2006	Mount Lemmon	Mount Lemmon Survey	·	2.6 km	MPC · JPL
469149	2015 FL_{325}	—	November 17, 2007	Kitt Peak	Spacewatch	·	3.4 km	MPC · JPL
469150	2015 FD_{343}	—	October 2, 2006	Mount Lemmon	Mount Lemmon Survey	·	3.9 km	MPC · JPL
469151	2015 GN_{3}	—	May 11, 2010	Mount Lemmon	Mount Lemmon Survey	·	2.6 km	MPC · JPL
469152	2015 GT_{19}	—	November 21, 2003	Kitt Peak	Spacewatch	·	1.8 km	MPC · JPL
469153	2015 GP_{21}	—	September 23, 1997	Kitt Peak	Spacewatch	NYS	1.2 km	MPC · JPL
469154	2015 GQ_{27}	—	October 2, 2006	Mount Lemmon	Mount Lemmon Survey	·	2.8 km	MPC · JPL
469155	2015 GK_{28}	—	September 30, 2006	Mount Lemmon	Mount Lemmon Survey	·	2.9 km	MPC · JPL
469156	2015 GD_{40}	—	February 20, 2009	Kitt Peak	Spacewatch	·	2.8 km	MPC · JPL
469157	2015 GU_{41}	—	April 28, 2011	Kitt Peak	Spacewatch	·	1.8 km	MPC · JPL
469158	2015 HZ_{6}	—	February 1, 2009	Mount Lemmon	Mount Lemmon Survey	·	2.4 km	MPC · JPL
469159	2015 HC_{8}	—	June 12, 2008	Kitt Peak	Spacewatch	·	1.9 km	MPC · JPL
469160	2015 HM_{59}	—	December 16, 2007	Kitt Peak	Spacewatch	·	3.0 km	MPC · JPL
469161	2015 HZ_{59}	—	November 5, 2007	Mount Lemmon	Mount Lemmon Survey	EOS	2.0 km	MPC · JPL
469162	2015 HO_{99}	—	March 21, 2009	Kitt Peak	Spacewatch	·	4.1 km	MPC · JPL
469163	2015 HD_{140}	—	December 2, 2010	Mount Lemmon	Mount Lemmon Survey	L4 · ERY	6.4 km	MPC · JPL
469164	2015 KG_{8}	—	March 3, 2005	Kitt Peak	Spacewatch	·	2.2 km	MPC · JPL
469165	2015 KW_{39}	—	October 4, 2006	Mount Lemmon	Mount Lemmon Survey	·	3.3 km	MPC · JPL
469166	2015 KP_{67}	—	March 25, 2009	Mount Lemmon	Mount Lemmon Survey	·	3.5 km	MPC · JPL
469167	2015 LF_{3}	—	August 29, 2006	Catalina	CSS	EOS	2.3 km	MPC · JPL
469168	2015 MZ_{24}	—	September 23, 2011	Kitt Peak	Spacewatch	CYB	3.8 km	MPC · JPL
469169	2015 MO_{34}	—	April 18, 2009	Mount Lemmon	Mount Lemmon Survey	·	3.0 km	MPC · JPL
469170	2015 NS_{23}	—	September 29, 2008	Mount Lemmon	Mount Lemmon Survey	T_{j} (2.99) · 3:2	6.9 km	MPC · JPL
469171	2016 AX_{1}	—	November 5, 1999	Kitt Peak	Spacewatch	V	720 m	MPC · JPL
469172	2016 AX_{129}	—	November 17, 2009	Mount Lemmon	Mount Lemmon Survey	·	2.2 km	MPC · JPL
469173	2016 CU_{75}	—	April 21, 2006	Kitt Peak	Spacewatch	·	2.8 km	MPC · JPL
469174	2016 CN_{259}	—	May 22, 2003	Kitt Peak	Spacewatch	·	1.4 km	MPC · JPL
469175	2016 CS_{259}	—	June 2, 2008	Kitt Peak	Spacewatch	·	1.6 km	MPC · JPL
469176	2016 CL_{261}	—	October 28, 2005	Mount Lemmon	Mount Lemmon Survey	·	1.5 km	MPC · JPL
469177	2016 EP_{37}	—	December 29, 2008	Kitt Peak	Spacewatch	·	3.0 km	MPC · JPL
469178	2016 EF_{79}	—	January 28, 2007	Mount Lemmon	Mount Lemmon Survey	·	890 m	MPC · JPL
469179	2016 EW_{151}	—	April 2, 2006	Kitt Peak	Spacewatch	·	670 m	MPC · JPL
469180	2016 EQ_{196}	—	January 19, 2005	Kitt Peak	Spacewatch	·	2.3 km	MPC · JPL
469181	2016 ER_{201}	—	July 28, 2009	Kitt Peak	Spacewatch	·	2.0 km	MPC · JPL
469182	2016 ES_{201}	—	March 16, 2005	Catalina	CSS	T_{j} (2.96)	3.1 km	MPC · JPL
469183	2016 FP_{7}	—	November 6, 2010	Mount Lemmon	Mount Lemmon Survey	·	1.5 km	MPC · JPL
469184	2016 FF_{10}	—	November 3, 2005	Kitt Peak	Spacewatch	·	1.6 km	MPC · JPL
469185	2016 FB_{39}	—	February 17, 2007	Mount Lemmon	Mount Lemmon Survey	·	1.3 km	MPC · JPL
469186	2016 FC_{39}	—	June 9, 2010	WISE	WISE	·	3.1 km	MPC · JPL
469187	2016 FD_{41}	—	March 27, 2012	Kitt Peak	Spacewatch	·	1.5 km	MPC · JPL
469188	2016 GK_{116}	—	March 21, 2002	Kitt Peak	Spacewatch	·	680 m	MPC · JPL
469189	2016 GB_{124}	—	April 24, 2012	Mount Lemmon	Mount Lemmon Survey	·	1.3 km	MPC · JPL
469190	2016 GA_{132}	—	October 27, 2005	Kitt Peak	Spacewatch	·	1.7 km	MPC · JPL
469191	2016 GU_{134}	—	September 12, 2004	Kitt Peak	Spacewatch	·	740 m	MPC · JPL
469192	2016 GB_{135}	—	September 7, 2008	Mount Lemmon	Mount Lemmon Survey	·	1.6 km	MPC · JPL
469193	2016 GV_{137}	—	April 24, 2006	Anderson Mesa	LONEOS	·	2.5 km	MPC · JPL
469194	2016 GG_{141}	—	September 8, 2004	Socorro	LINEAR	·	1.4 km	MPC · JPL
469195	2016 GW_{150}	—	June 16, 2010	WISE	WISE	·	3.7 km	MPC · JPL
469196	2016 GE_{158}	—	May 13, 2005	Kitt Peak	Spacewatch	·	2.3 km	MPC · JPL
469197	2016 GF_{182}	—	January 23, 2006	Kitt Peak	Spacewatch	·	710 m	MPC · JPL
469198	2016 GR_{182}	—	November 25, 2005	Mount Lemmon	Mount Lemmon Survey	·	2.1 km	MPC · JPL
469199	2016 GV_{185}	—	June 4, 1995	Kitt Peak	Spacewatch	·	1.4 km	MPC · JPL
469200	2016 GH_{190}	—	June 2, 2010	WISE	WISE	·	4.4 km	MPC · JPL

== 469201–469300 ==
back to top

Designation			Discovery			Properties		Ref
Permanent	Provisional	Named after	Date	Site	Discoverer(s)	Category	Diam.	Ref
469201	2016 GN_{191}	—	October 14, 1998	Kitt Peak	Spacewatch	·	1.5 km	MPC · JPL
469202	2016 GJ_{192}	—	April 8, 2010	Mount Lemmon	Mount Lemmon Survey	·	2.7 km	MPC · JPL
469203	2016 GF_{193}	—	March 26, 2007	Kitt Peak	Spacewatch	MAR	960 m	MPC · JPL
469204	2016 GK_{193}	—	March 23, 2003	Kitt Peak	Spacewatch	·	1.5 km	MPC · JPL
469205	2016 GA_{215}	—	September 19, 2003	Kitt Peak	Spacewatch	·	2.9 km	MPC · JPL
469206	2016 GO_{218}	—	May 12, 2012	Catalina	CSS	·	1.4 km	MPC · JPL
469207	2016 GD_{233}	—	January 21, 2002	Kitt Peak	Spacewatch	·	670 m	MPC · JPL
469208	2016 GX_{233}	—	October 6, 2007	Kitt Peak	Spacewatch	·	1.9 km	MPC · JPL
469209	2016 GO_{239}	—	October 7, 2007	Mount Lemmon	Mount Lemmon Survey	·	3.2 km	MPC · JPL
469210	2016 GB_{240}	—	January 8, 2010	Mount Lemmon	Mount Lemmon Survey	·	3.9 km	MPC · JPL
469211	2016 GJ_{240}	—	March 14, 2005	Catalina	CSS	·	2.2 km	MPC · JPL
469212	2016 GL_{240}	—	October 12, 2007	Catalina	CSS	·	2.5 km	MPC · JPL
469213	2016 GP_{241}	—	April 21, 1999	Kitt Peak	Spacewatch	·	1.7 km	MPC · JPL
469214	2016 GZ_{241}	—	August 15, 2009	Kitt Peak	Spacewatch	·	1.1 km	MPC · JPL
469215	2016 GN_{251}	—	October 28, 2013	Kitt Peak	Spacewatch	·	2.7 km	MPC · JPL
469216	2016 HU	—	January 18, 2008	Mount Lemmon	Mount Lemmon Survey	·	1.3 km	MPC · JPL
469217	2016 HD_{2}	—	November 21, 2006	Mount Lemmon	Mount Lemmon Survey	·	1.7 km	MPC · JPL
469218	2016 HE_{2}	—	September 27, 2008	Mount Lemmon	Mount Lemmon Survey	·	2.2 km	MPC · JPL
469219 Kamoʻoalewa	2016 HO_{3}	Kamoʻoalewa	April 27, 2016	Haleakala	Pan-STARRS 1	APO · fast	50 m	MPC · JPL
469220	2016 HZ_{5}	—	October 19, 2006	Kitt Peak	Spacewatch	T_{j} (2.99)	3.7 km	MPC · JPL
469221	2016 HJ_{7}	—	January 27, 2007	Kitt Peak	Spacewatch	·	1.2 km	MPC · JPL
469222	2016 HO_{7}	—	December 1, 2008	Catalina	CSS	·	2.6 km	MPC · JPL
469223	2016 HT_{7}	—	November 21, 2006	Mount Lemmon	Mount Lemmon Survey	·	1.4 km	MPC · JPL
469224	2016 HX_{7}	—	February 4, 2006	Kitt Peak	Spacewatch	·	1.8 km	MPC · JPL
469225	2016 HR_{9}	—	May 21, 2006	Kitt Peak	Spacewatch	PHO	800 m	MPC · JPL
469226	2016 HU_{9}	—	April 14, 2010	WISE	WISE	·	1.9 km	MPC · JPL
469227	2016 HV_{10}	—	November 3, 2008	Kitt Peak	Spacewatch	·	3.3 km	MPC · JPL
469228	2016 HD_{15}	—	April 13, 2010	WISE	WISE	·	4.8 km	MPC · JPL
469229	2016 HZ_{16}	—	March 2, 2009	Mount Lemmon	Mount Lemmon Survey	·	660 m	MPC · JPL
469230	2016 HT_{23}	—	March 26, 2006	Kitt Peak	Spacewatch	·	3.9 km	MPC · JPL
469231	2016 JU	—	October 11, 2005	Kitt Peak	Spacewatch	·	1.7 km	MPC · JPL
469232	2016 JD_{4}	—	August 19, 2001	Socorro	LINEAR	·	1.4 km	MPC · JPL
469233	2016 JF_{4}	—	January 3, 2011	Mount Lemmon	Mount Lemmon Survey	·	1.6 km	MPC · JPL
469234	2016 JG_{5}	—	April 21, 2009	Mount Lemmon	Mount Lemmon Survey	·	830 m	MPC · JPL
469235	2016 JD_{7}	—	December 1, 2005	Catalina	CSS	EUN	1.4 km	MPC · JPL
469236	2016 JT_{7}	—	December 31, 2007	Mount Lemmon	Mount Lemmon Survey	·	1.2 km	MPC · JPL
469237	2016 JQ_{8}	—	April 11, 2010	Catalina	CSS	T_{j} (2.99)	4.5 km	MPC · JPL
469238	2016 JU_{8}	—	January 15, 2007	Catalina	CSS	·	2.0 km	MPC · JPL
469239	2016 JD_{10}	—	November 10, 2004	Kitt Peak	Spacewatch	·	1.9 km	MPC · JPL
469240	2016 JH_{10}	—	April 11, 2011	Mount Lemmon	Mount Lemmon Survey	·	2.2 km	MPC · JPL
469241	2016 JO_{10}	—	October 11, 2007	Catalina	CSS	·	3.5 km	MPC · JPL
469242	2016 JW_{11}	—	October 10, 2010	Mount Lemmon	Mount Lemmon Survey	PHO	1.3 km	MPC · JPL
469243	2016 JC_{13}	—	February 4, 2006	Kitt Peak	Spacewatch	·	700 m	MPC · JPL
469244	2016 JY_{18}	—	December 8, 2008	Mount Lemmon	Mount Lemmon Survey	·	4.3 km	MPC · JPL
469245	2016 JG_{19}	—	June 21, 2011	Kitt Peak	Spacewatch	·	3.7 km	MPC · JPL
469246	2016 JQ_{19}	—	November 21, 2003	Kitt Peak	Spacewatch	·	2.5 km	MPC · JPL
469247	2016 JW_{19}	—	April 11, 2005	Kitt Peak	Spacewatch	·	3.5 km	MPC · JPL
469248	2016 JA_{21}	—	April 2, 2009	Kitt Peak	Spacewatch	V	620 m	MPC · JPL
469249	2016 JH_{21}	—	March 28, 2012	Mount Lemmon	Mount Lemmon Survey	·	1.6 km	MPC · JPL
469250	2016 JO_{23}	—	May 8, 1999	Catalina	CSS	·	2.2 km	MPC · JPL
469251	2016 JY_{23}	—	October 9, 2008	Catalina	CSS	·	2.2 km	MPC · JPL
469252	2016 JD_{24}	—	November 18, 2009	Mount Lemmon	Mount Lemmon Survey	·	2.7 km	MPC · JPL
469253	2016 JA_{25}	—	November 15, 1998	Kitt Peak	Spacewatch	·	1.5 km	MPC · JPL
469254	2016 JU_{26}	—	September 20, 2006	Kitt Peak	Spacewatch	·	900 m	MPC · JPL
469255	2016 JX_{26}	—	May 2, 2003	Kitt Peak	Spacewatch	·	1.9 km	MPC · JPL
469256	2016 JE_{27}	—	March 28, 2009	Mount Lemmon	Mount Lemmon Survey	·	980 m	MPC · JPL
469257	2016 JN_{29}	—	December 9, 2004	Kitt Peak	Spacewatch	·	1.0 km	MPC · JPL
469258	2016 JQ_{29}	—	June 2, 2010	WISE	WISE	·	5.4 km	MPC · JPL
469259	2016 JA_{30}	—	March 27, 2011	Mount Lemmon	Mount Lemmon Survey	·	2.5 km	MPC · JPL
469260	2016 JB_{30}	—	November 24, 2006	Mount Lemmon	Mount Lemmon Survey	·	1.3 km	MPC · JPL
469261	2016 JF_{30}	—	April 28, 2009	Mount Lemmon	Mount Lemmon Survey	·	800 m	MPC · JPL
469262	2016 JH_{30}	—	September 27, 2008	Catalina	CSS	·	2.4 km	MPC · JPL
469263	2016 JP_{30}	—	June 2, 2003	Kitt Peak	Spacewatch	·	1.9 km	MPC · JPL
469264	2016 JR_{30}	—	November 30, 2008	Mount Lemmon	Mount Lemmon Survey	EOS	3.9 km	MPC · JPL
469265	2016 JT_{30}	—	November 6, 2005	Mount Lemmon	Mount Lemmon Survey	EUN	1.5 km	MPC · JPL
469266	2016 JY_{30}	—	September 22, 2009	Kitt Peak	Spacewatch	EUN	1.2 km	MPC · JPL
469267	2016 JX_{31}	—	December 30, 2011	Kitt Peak	Spacewatch	·	710 m	MPC · JPL
469268	2016 JA_{32}	—	November 1, 2008	Mount Lemmon	Mount Lemmon Survey	·	3.9 km	MPC · JPL
469269	2016 JE_{32}	—	February 6, 2007	Mount Lemmon	Mount Lemmon Survey	KON	3.4 km	MPC · JPL
469270	2016 JH_{32}	—	April 25, 2003	Kitt Peak	Spacewatch	·	710 m	MPC · JPL
469271	2016 JL_{32}	—	November 3, 2005	Mount Lemmon	Mount Lemmon Survey	·	1.3 km	MPC · JPL
469272	2016 JO_{32}	—	June 30, 2004	Siding Spring	SSS	·	1.9 km	MPC · JPL
469273	2016 JQ_{34}	—	May 18, 1999	Socorro	LINEAR	·	2.5 km	MPC · JPL
469274	2016 JB_{35}	—	April 11, 2003	Kitt Peak	Spacewatch	·	1.9 km	MPC · JPL
469275	2016 JC_{35}	—	May 11, 2005	Kitt Peak	Spacewatch	LIX	4.3 km	MPC · JPL
469276	1993 RQ	—	September 16, 1993	Kitt Peak	Spacewatch	·	720 m	MPC · JPL
469277	1993 TC_{17}	—	October 9, 1993	La Silla	E. W. Elst	·	1.8 km	MPC · JPL
469278	1994 RF_{3}	—	September 2, 1994	Kitt Peak	Spacewatch	·	1.0 km	MPC · JPL
469279	1995 QP_{5}	—	August 22, 1995	Kitt Peak	Spacewatch	·	630 m	MPC · JPL
469280	1995 SS_{62}	—	September 25, 1995	Kitt Peak	Spacewatch	·	2.0 km	MPC · JPL
469281	1995 TJ_{3}	—	October 15, 1995	Kitt Peak	Spacewatch	THM	2.1 km	MPC · JPL
469282	1995 UK_{11}	—	October 17, 1995	Kitt Peak	Spacewatch	HYG	3.1 km	MPC · JPL
469283	1995 UN_{20}	—	October 19, 1995	Kitt Peak	Spacewatch	·	1.8 km	MPC · JPL
469284	1995 UL_{23}	—	October 19, 1995	Kitt Peak	Spacewatch	·	2.3 km	MPC · JPL
469285	1995 UV_{41}	—	October 23, 1995	Kitt Peak	Spacewatch	EOS	1.8 km	MPC · JPL
469286	1995 UY_{43}	—	October 25, 1995	Kitt Peak	Spacewatch	·	850 m	MPC · JPL
469287	1995 UV_{55}	—	October 23, 1995	Kitt Peak	Spacewatch	·	2.1 km	MPC · JPL
469288	1995 VW_{11}	—	November 15, 1995	Kitt Peak	Spacewatch	·	2.2 km	MPC · JPL
469289	1995 VZ_{17}	—	November 15, 1995	Kitt Peak	Spacewatch	THM	2.0 km	MPC · JPL
469290	1996 TS_{36}	—	October 7, 1996	Kitt Peak	Spacewatch	·	1.3 km	MPC · JPL
469291	1996 VE_{11}	—	November 4, 1996	Kitt Peak	Spacewatch	·	730 m	MPC · JPL
469292	1996 VU_{28}	—	November 7, 1996	Kitt Peak	Spacewatch	EOS	1.6 km	MPC · JPL
469293	1996 XW_{4}	—	December 6, 1996	Kitt Peak	Spacewatch	·	880 m	MPC · JPL
469294	1996 XW_{9}	—	December 1, 1996	Kitt Peak	Spacewatch	·	610 m	MPC · JPL
469295	1996 XL_{24}	—	December 7, 1996	Kitt Peak	Spacewatch	·	1.1 km	MPC · JPL
469296	1996 XB_{36}	—	December 12, 1996	Kitt Peak	Spacewatch	·	1.8 km	MPC · JPL
469297	1997 BN_{6}	—	January 31, 1997	Kitt Peak	Spacewatch	·	1.4 km	MPC · JPL
469298	1997 EN_{16}	—	March 5, 1997	Kitt Peak	Spacewatch	·	910 m	MPC · JPL
469299	1997 KZ_{1}	—	May 28, 1997	Kitt Peak	Spacewatch	PHO	1.0 km	MPC · JPL
469300	1997 LQ_{4}	—	May 30, 1997	Kitt Peak	Spacewatch	·	830 m	MPC · JPL

== 469301–469400 ==
back to top

Designation			Discovery			Properties		Ref
Permanent	Provisional	Named after	Date	Site	Discoverer(s)	Category	Diam.	Ref
469301	1997 SK_{12}	—	September 27, 1997	Kitt Peak	Spacewatch	·	1.6 km	MPC · JPL
469302	1998 SJ_{51}	—	September 26, 1998	Kitt Peak	Spacewatch	·	1.4 km	MPC · JPL
469303	1998 TH_{20}	—	October 13, 1998	Kitt Peak	Spacewatch	·	2.7 km	MPC · JPL
469304	1998 UV_{1}	—	October 20, 1998	Prescott	P. G. Comba	·	2.1 km	MPC · JPL
469305	1998 YM_{19}	—	December 25, 1998	Kitt Peak	Spacewatch	·	1.0 km	MPC · JPL
469306	1999 CD_{158}	—	February 10, 1999	Mauna Kea	J. X. Luu, D. C. Jewitt, C. A. Trujillo	res · 4:7	310 km	MPC · JPL
469307	1999 RD_{36}	—	September 7, 1999	Socorro	LINEAR	·	1.2 km	MPC · JPL
469308	1999 RU_{103}	—	September 8, 1999	Socorro	LINEAR	·	1.2 km	MPC · JPL
469309	1999 RZ_{189}	—	September 9, 1999	Socorro	LINEAR	(1547)	1.7 km	MPC · JPL
469310	1999 RE_{212}	—	August 11, 1999	Socorro	LINEAR	·	1.6 km	MPC · JPL
469311	1999 RZ_{239}	—	September 9, 1999	Socorro	LINEAR	(1547)	1.5 km	MPC · JPL
469312	1999 SK_{25}	—	September 30, 1999	Catalina	CSS	·	580 m	MPC · JPL
469313	1999 TH_{46}	—	October 4, 1999	Kitt Peak	Spacewatch	·	2.3 km	MPC · JPL
469314	1999 TA_{62}	—	October 7, 1999	Kitt Peak	Spacewatch	·	1.8 km	MPC · JPL
469315	1999 TD_{138}	—	October 6, 1999	Socorro	LINEAR	·	1.1 km	MPC · JPL
469316	1999 TG_{185}	—	September 18, 1999	Socorro	LINEAR	(1547)	1.6 km	MPC · JPL
469317	1999 TS_{212}	—	October 15, 1999	Socorro	LINEAR	·	720 m	MPC · JPL
469318	1999 TP_{224}	—	October 1, 1999	Kitt Peak	Spacewatch	·	2.5 km	MPC · JPL
469319	1999 TR_{254}	—	September 14, 1999	Socorro	LINEAR	·	1.5 km	MPC · JPL
469320	1999 TD_{267}	—	September 7, 1999	Socorro	LINEAR	(1547)	1.7 km	MPC · JPL
469321	1999 TN_{306}	—	September 18, 1999	Kitt Peak	Spacewatch	EUN	940 m	MPC · JPL
469322	1999 TG_{316}	—	October 10, 1999	Kitt Peak	Spacewatch	MIS	2.0 km	MPC · JPL
469323	1999 UB_{22}	—	October 6, 1999	Socorro	LINEAR	EOS	1.8 km	MPC · JPL
469324	1999 UZ_{31}	—	October 31, 1999	Kitt Peak	Spacewatch	·	1.6 km	MPC · JPL
469325	1999 VC_{106}	—	November 9, 1999	Socorro	LINEAR	·	670 m	MPC · JPL
469326	1999 VH_{191}	—	November 12, 1999	Socorro	LINEAR	·	690 m	MPC · JPL
469327	1999 VS_{206}	—	October 19, 1999	Kitt Peak	Spacewatch	·	1.5 km	MPC · JPL
469328	1999 WR_{22}	—	November 17, 1999	Kitt Peak	Spacewatch	·	520 m	MPC · JPL
469329	1999 YJ_{5}	—	December 28, 1999	Socorro	LINEAR	·	1.2 km	MPC · JPL
469330	2000 GJ_{63}	—	April 3, 2000	Kitt Peak	Spacewatch	·	1.3 km	MPC · JPL
469331	2000 GM_{144}	—	March 29, 2000	Kitt Peak	Spacewatch	NYS	900 m	MPC · JPL
469332	2000 KE_{37}	—	May 24, 2000	Kitt Peak	Spacewatch	·	1.2 km	MPC · JPL
469333	2000 PE_{30}	—	August 5, 2000	Mauna Kea	M. J. Holman	SDO	225 km	MPC · JPL
469334	2000 QG_{252}	—	August 26, 2000	Cerro Tololo	M. W. Buie	·	1.2 km	MPC · JPL
469335	2000 SH_{50}	—	September 23, 2000	Socorro	LINEAR	·	960 m	MPC · JPL
469336	2000 SG_{51}	—	September 1, 2000	Socorro	LINEAR	·	2.8 km	MPC · JPL
469337	2000 SE_{60}	—	September 24, 2000	Socorro	LINEAR	·	1.1 km	MPC · JPL
469338	2000 SF_{137}	—	September 23, 2000	Socorro	LINEAR	·	890 m	MPC · JPL
469339	2000 SG_{196}	—	September 24, 2000	Socorro	LINEAR	·	940 m	MPC · JPL
469340	2000 SK_{249}	—	September 24, 2000	Socorro	LINEAR	·	2.8 km	MPC · JPL
469341	2000 SD_{291}	—	September 27, 2000	Socorro	LINEAR	·	740 m	MPC · JPL
469342	2000 SM_{300}	—	September 7, 2000	Kitt Peak	Spacewatch	·	3.1 km	MPC · JPL
469343	2000 SF_{310}	—	September 26, 2000	Socorro	LINEAR	·	3.7 km	MPC · JPL
469344	2000 TF_{8}	—	October 1, 2000	Socorro	LINEAR	(5)	920 m	MPC · JPL
469345	2000 TP_{53}	—	October 1, 2000	Socorro	LINEAR	·	2.5 km	MPC · JPL
469346	2000 TN_{64}	—	October 5, 2000	Kitt Peak	Spacewatch	·	560 m	MPC · JPL
469347	2000 TG_{67}	—	October 2, 2000	Socorro	LINEAR	·	3.5 km	MPC · JPL
469348	2000 UZ_{18}	—	October 25, 2000	Socorro	LINEAR	·	1.7 km	MPC · JPL
469349	2000 UF_{73}	—	October 25, 2000	Socorro	LINEAR	·	1.1 km	MPC · JPL
469350	2000 WL_{44}	—	November 21, 2000	Socorro	LINEAR	·	1.3 km	MPC · JPL
469351	2000 WE_{74}	—	November 20, 2000	Socorro	LINEAR	(5)	1.1 km	MPC · JPL
469352	2000 WN_{162}	—	November 20, 2000	Socorro	LINEAR	·	1.2 km	MPC · JPL
469353	2000 YH_{47}	—	December 30, 2000	Socorro	LINEAR	·	1.7 km	MPC · JPL
469354	2001 CA_{4}	—	January 18, 2001	Socorro	LINEAR	·	1.7 km	MPC · JPL
469355	2001 CH_{25}	—	February 1, 2001	Socorro	LINEAR	·	2.7 km	MPC · JPL
469356	2001 DR_{8}	—	February 16, 2001	Kitt Peak	Spacewatch	APO	630 m	MPC · JPL
469357	2001 DT_{16}	—	February 16, 2001	Socorro	LINEAR	T_{j} (2.94)	3.9 km	MPC · JPL
469358	2001 FO_{191}	—	March 20, 2001	Kitt Peak	Spacewatch	EUN	1.2 km	MPC · JPL
469359	2001 HX_{13}	—	April 23, 2001	Kitt Peak	Spacewatch	·	790 m	MPC · JPL
469360	2001 HC_{31}	—	April 27, 2001	Kitt Peak	Spacewatch	·	710 m	MPC · JPL
469361	2001 HY_{65}	—	April 26, 2001	Mauna Kea	K. J. Meech, M. W. Buie	cubewano (hot)	252 km	MPC · JPL
469362	2001 KB_{77}	—	May 23, 2001	Cerro Tololo	M. W. Buie	plutino	140 km	MPC · JPL
469363	2001 KZ_{77}	—	May 24, 2001	Cerro Tololo	M. W. Buie	·	1.2 km	MPC · JPL
469364	2001 NO_{13}	—	July 12, 2001	Palomar	NEAT	·	1.0 km	MPC · JPL
469365	2001 OX_{37}	—	July 20, 2001	Palomar	NEAT	·	1.0 km	MPC · JPL
469366 Watkins	2001 PH_{13}	Watkins	August 11, 2001	Haleakala	NEAT	·	970 m	MPC · JPL
469367	2001 PG_{54}	—	August 14, 2001	Haleakala	NEAT	NYS	1.1 km	MPC · JPL
469368	2001 QB_{146}	—	August 25, 2001	Kitt Peak	Spacewatch	·	940 m	MPC · JPL
469369	2001 QO_{146}	—	July 27, 2001	Anderson Mesa	LONEOS	·	950 m	MPC · JPL
469370	2001 QH_{208}	—	August 23, 2001	Anderson Mesa	LONEOS	MAS	810 m	MPC · JPL
469371	2001 QM_{231}	—	August 24, 2001	Anderson Mesa	LONEOS	PHO	810 m	MPC · JPL
469372	2001 QF_{298}	—	August 19, 2001	Cerro Tololo	M. W. Buie	plutino	408 km	MPC · JPL
469373	2001 RQ_{3}	—	September 9, 2001	Anderson Mesa	LONEOS	AMO	510 m	MPC · JPL
469374	2001 RU_{25}	—	September 7, 2001	Socorro	LINEAR	·	1.0 km	MPC · JPL
469375	2001 RN_{135}	—	September 12, 2001	Socorro	LINEAR	·	1.2 km	MPC · JPL
469376	2001 RW_{141}	—	September 15, 2001	Palomar	NEAT	·	1.1 km	MPC · JPL
469377	2001 SM_{99}	—	September 12, 2001	Kitt Peak	Spacewatch	·	2.4 km	MPC · JPL
469378	2001 SL_{103}	—	September 20, 2001	Socorro	LINEAR	·	2.0 km	MPC · JPL
469379	2001 SW_{157}	—	September 17, 2001	Socorro	LINEAR	·	1.6 km	MPC · JPL
469380	2001 SX_{182}	—	September 19, 2001	Socorro	LINEAR	MAS	700 m	MPC · JPL
469381	2001 SD_{185}	—	September 19, 2001	Socorro	LINEAR	·	1.1 km	MPC · JPL
469382	2001 SM_{193}	—	September 19, 2001	Socorro	LINEAR	·	960 m	MPC · JPL
469383	2001 ST_{195}	—	September 19, 2001	Socorro	LINEAR	·	1.2 km	MPC · JPL
469384	2001 SA_{209}	—	September 19, 2001	Socorro	LINEAR	EOS	1.8 km	MPC · JPL
469385	2001 SD_{209}	—	September 19, 2001	Socorro	LINEAR	·	1.6 km	MPC · JPL
469386	2001 SY_{231}	—	September 19, 2001	Socorro	LINEAR	·	1.7 km	MPC · JPL
469387	2001 SE_{260}	—	September 20, 2001	Socorro	LINEAR	·	960 m	MPC · JPL
469388	2001 SV_{318}	—	September 21, 2001	Socorro	LINEAR	·	1.7 km	MPC · JPL
469389	2001 SF_{320}	—	September 21, 2001	Socorro	LINEAR	·	1.3 km	MPC · JPL
469390	2001 SS_{333}	—	September 19, 2001	Kitt Peak	Spacewatch	NYS	930 m	MPC · JPL
469391	2001 SV_{333}	—	September 19, 2001	Kitt Peak	Spacewatch	·	2.1 km	MPC · JPL
469392	2001 TY_{23}	—	October 14, 2001	Socorro	LINEAR	·	1.1 km	MPC · JPL
469393	2001 TZ_{90}	—	October 14, 2001	Socorro	LINEAR	·	1.7 km	MPC · JPL
469394	2001 TH_{124}	—	September 10, 2001	Socorro	LINEAR	·	1.3 km	MPC · JPL
469395	2001 TW_{158}	—	October 11, 2001	Palomar	NEAT	MAS	690 m	MPC · JPL
469396	2001 TG_{163}	—	October 11, 2001	Palomar	NEAT	·	1.1 km	MPC · JPL
469397	2001 TJ_{215}	—	October 13, 2001	Palomar	NEAT	·	2.0 km	MPC · JPL
469398	2001 TQ_{247}	—	October 14, 2001	Apache Point	SDSS	MAS	780 m	MPC · JPL
469399	2001 UQ_{15}	—	September 20, 2001	Socorro	LINEAR	·	3.2 km	MPC · JPL
469400	2001 UU_{63}	—	October 18, 2001	Socorro	LINEAR	·	890 m	MPC · JPL

== 469401–469500 ==
back to top

Designation			Discovery			Properties		Ref
Permanent	Provisional	Named after	Date	Site	Discoverer(s)	Category	Diam.	Ref
469401	2001 UN_{76}	—	October 17, 2001	Socorro	LINEAR	NYS	1.1 km	MPC · JPL
469402	2001 UN_{88}	—	October 21, 2001	Kitt Peak	Spacewatch	·	1.8 km	MPC · JPL
469403	2001 UG_{91}	—	October 23, 2001	Kitt Peak	Spacewatch	NYS	1.0 km	MPC · JPL
469404	2001 UV_{137}	—	October 23, 2001	Socorro	LINEAR	·	1.1 km	MPC · JPL
469405	2001 UA_{199}	—	October 19, 2001	Palomar	NEAT	·	1.2 km	MPC · JPL
469406	2001 UF_{210}	—	September 18, 2001	Kitt Peak	Spacewatch	EUN	910 m	MPC · JPL
469407	2001 UE_{214}	—	October 16, 2001	Kitt Peak	Spacewatch	MAS	750 m	MPC · JPL
469408	2001 UY_{215}	—	October 23, 2001	Socorro	LINEAR	·	3.0 km	MPC · JPL
469409	2001 UZ_{225}	—	October 16, 2001	Palomar	NEAT	·	2.0 km	MPC · JPL
469410	2001 VW_{50}	—	November 10, 2001	Socorro	LINEAR	·	1.7 km	MPC · JPL
469411	2001 VQ_{72}	—	November 12, 2001	Kitt Peak	Spacewatch	·	900 m	MPC · JPL
469412	2001 WX_{6}	—	November 17, 2001	Socorro	LINEAR	·	1.6 km	MPC · JPL
469413	2001 WC_{35}	—	November 17, 2001	Socorro	LINEAR	·	1.4 km	MPC · JPL
469414	2001 WG_{51}	—	November 19, 2001	Socorro	LINEAR	NYS	990 m	MPC · JPL
469415	2001 XK_{82}	—	December 11, 2001	Socorro	LINEAR	·	1.6 km	MPC · JPL
469416	2001 XH_{124}	—	December 14, 2001	Socorro	LINEAR	·	1.9 km	MPC · JPL
469417	2001 XN_{227}	—	December 15, 2001	Socorro	LINEAR	·	1.4 km	MPC · JPL
469418	2001 XJ_{244}	—	November 12, 2001	Socorro	LINEAR	·	2.8 km	MPC · JPL
469419	2001 XA_{249}	—	December 14, 2001	Kitt Peak	Spacewatch	·	2.8 km	MPC · JPL
469420	2001 XP_{254}	—	December 10, 2001	Mauna Kea	D. C. Jewitt, S. S. Sheppard, Kleyna, J.	res · 3:5 · moon	104 km	MPC · JPL
469421	2001 XD_{255}	—	December 9, 2001	Mauna Kea	S. S. Sheppard, D. C. Jewitt, Kleyna, J.	plutino	347 km	MPC · JPL
469422	2001 XY_{260}	—	December 10, 2001	Kitt Peak	Spacewatch	·	2.5 km	MPC · JPL
469423	2001 YQ_{7}	—	December 17, 2001	Socorro	LINEAR	·	3.3 km	MPC · JPL
469424	2001 YM_{83}	—	December 18, 2001	Socorro	LINEAR	·	3.4 km	MPC · JPL
469425	2001 YK_{123}	—	December 17, 2001	Socorro	LINEAR	·	3.8 km	MPC · JPL
469426	2002 AO_{105}	—	January 9, 2002	Socorro	LINEAR	·	2.8 km	MPC · JPL
469427	2002 AE_{129}	—	December 23, 2001	Socorro	LINEAR	H	420 m	MPC · JPL
469428	2002 AV_{142}	—	January 13, 2002	Socorro	LINEAR	·	980 m	MPC · JPL
469429	2002 BY_{30}	—	January 18, 2002	Anderson Mesa	LONEOS	T_{j} (2.99)	3.5 km	MPC · JPL
469430	2002 CK_{10}	—	February 6, 2002	Socorro	LINEAR	H	510 m	MPC · JPL
469431	2002 CN_{113}	—	January 8, 2002	Socorro	LINEAR	·	3.2 km	MPC · JPL
469432	2002 CU_{225}	—	February 3, 2002	Palomar	NEAT	H	590 m	MPC · JPL
469433	2002 CO_{279}	—	February 7, 2002	Kitt Peak	Spacewatch	·	2.9 km	MPC · JPL
469434	2002 DO_{1}	—	February 18, 2002	Cima Ekar	ADAS	·	1.1 km	MPC · JPL
469435	2002 DB_{18}	—	February 20, 2002	Socorro	LINEAR	·	1.5 km	MPC · JPL
469436	2002 EB_{103}	—	March 9, 2002	Palomar	NEAT	·	610 m	MPC · JPL
469437	2002 FK_{7}	—	March 22, 2002	Palomar	NEAT	T_{j} (2.99)	3.1 km	MPC · JPL
469438	2002 GV_{31}	—	April 6, 2002	Cerro Tololo	M. W. Buie	cubewano (cold)	130 km	MPC · JPL
469439	2002 GO_{74}	—	March 15, 2002	Kitt Peak	Spacewatch	JUN	800 m	MPC · JPL
469440	2002 GK_{81}	—	April 10, 2002	Socorro	LINEAR	·	1.7 km	MPC · JPL
469441	2002 GP_{126}	—	April 2, 2002	Kitt Peak	Spacewatch	·	1.2 km	MPC · JPL
469442	2002 GG_{166}	—	April 9, 2002	Cerro Tololo	Deep Ecliptic Survey	centaur	125 km	MPC · JPL
469443	2002 KT_{3}	—	May 17, 2002	Socorro	LINEAR	PHO	900 m	MPC · JPL
469444	2002 KY_{3}	—	May 18, 2002	Socorro	LINEAR	PHO	1 km	MPC · JPL
469445	2002 LT_{24}	—	June 9, 2002	Socorro	LINEAR	ATE	140 m	MPC · JPL
469446	2002 NL_{8}	—	July 9, 2002	Socorro	LINEAR	·	830 m	MPC · JPL
469447	2002 NO_{58}	—	July 3, 2002	Palomar	NEAT	·	1.9 km	MPC · JPL
469448	2002 NE_{72}	—	July 8, 2002	Palomar	NEAT	·	590 m	MPC · JPL
469449	2002 OW_{19}	—	July 21, 2002	Palomar	NEAT	·	1.2 km	MPC · JPL
469450	2002 PR_{2}	—	August 3, 2002	Palomar	NEAT	·	1.0 km	MPC · JPL
469451	2002 PQ_{65}	—	August 5, 2002	Palomar	NEAT	·	1.6 km	MPC · JPL
469452	2002 PE_{74}	—	August 12, 2002	Socorro	LINEAR	·	2.1 km	MPC · JPL
469453	2002 PJ_{74}	—	August 12, 2002	Socorro	LINEAR	·	1.6 km	MPC · JPL
469454	2002 PT_{164}	—	August 8, 2002	Palomar	S. F. Hönig	·	1.1 km	MPC · JPL
469455	2002 QR_{14}	—	August 12, 2002	Socorro	LINEAR	·	1.7 km	MPC · JPL
469456	2002 QZ_{38}	—	August 30, 2002	Kitt Peak	Spacewatch	·	1.7 km	MPC · JPL
469457	2002 QE_{44}	—	August 30, 2002	Palomar	NEAT	·	650 m	MPC · JPL
469458	2002 QE_{54}	—	August 17, 2002	Palomar	Lowe, A.	·	720 m	MPC · JPL
469459	2002 QU_{64}	—	August 28, 2002	Palomar	NEAT	·	800 m	MPC · JPL
469460	2002 QP_{74}	—	August 19, 2002	Palomar	NEAT	·	760 m	MPC · JPL
469461	2002 QK_{92}	—	August 16, 2002	Palomar	NEAT	·	510 m	MPC · JPL
469462	2002 QF_{106}	—	August 19, 2002	Palomar	NEAT	·	710 m	MPC · JPL
469463	2002 QT_{115}	—	August 18, 2002	Palomar	NEAT	·	1.7 km	MPC · JPL
469464	2002 QU_{137}	—	August 27, 2002	Palomar	NEAT	·	580 m	MPC · JPL
469465	2002 RT_{39}	—	September 5, 2002	Anderson Mesa	LONEOS	·	2.0 km	MPC · JPL
469466	2002 RR_{60}	—	September 5, 2002	Anderson Mesa	LONEOS	·	750 m	MPC · JPL
469467	2002 RQ_{115}	—	September 6, 2002	Socorro	LINEAR	·	780 m	MPC · JPL
469468	2002 RG_{124}	—	September 9, 2002	Haleakala	NEAT	·	1.9 km	MPC · JPL
469469	2002 RE_{131}	—	September 11, 2002	Palomar	NEAT	·	2.3 km	MPC · JPL
469470	2002 RC_{189}	—	September 13, 2002	Palomar	NEAT	·	1.3 km	MPC · JPL
469471	2002 RE_{189}	—	September 13, 2002	Palomar	NEAT	·	1.9 km	MPC · JPL
469472	2002 RH_{223}	—	September 6, 2002	Socorro	LINEAR	·	2.2 km	MPC · JPL
469473	2002 RY_{224}	—	September 13, 2002	Haleakala	NEAT	·	740 m	MPC · JPL
469474	2002 RW_{238}	—	September 1, 2002	Haleakala	R. Matson	H	520 m	MPC · JPL
469475	2002 RR_{257}	—	September 15, 2002	Palomar	NEAT	·	1.8 km	MPC · JPL
469476	2002 RL_{266}	—	September 1, 2002	Palomar	NEAT	·	480 m	MPC · JPL
469477	2002 SM_{12}	—	September 27, 2002	Palomar	NEAT	·	880 m	MPC · JPL
469478	2002 TU_{2}	—	October 1, 2002	Anderson Mesa	LONEOS	·	880 m	MPC · JPL
469479	2002 TW_{70}	—	October 3, 2002	Palomar	NEAT	·	860 m	MPC · JPL
469480	2002 TP_{76}	—	October 1, 2002	Anderson Mesa	LONEOS	·	750 m	MPC · JPL
469481	2002 TP_{91}	—	October 3, 2002	Palomar	NEAT	·	1.6 km	MPC · JPL
469482	2002 TW_{124}	—	October 4, 2002	Palomar	NEAT	·	2.5 km	MPC · JPL
469483	2002 TP_{153}	—	October 5, 2002	Palomar	NEAT	·	700 m	MPC · JPL
469484	2002 TJ_{165}	—	October 2, 2002	Haleakala	NEAT	·	2.1 km	MPC · JPL
469485	2002 TK_{202}	—	October 4, 2002	Socorro	LINEAR	DOR	2.5 km	MPC · JPL
469486	2002 TU_{275}	—	October 9, 2002	Socorro	LINEAR	·	1.0 km	MPC · JPL
469487	2002 TF_{299}	—	October 13, 2002	Kitt Peak	Spacewatch	·	840 m	MPC · JPL
469488	2002 TZ_{306}	—	October 4, 2002	Apache Point	SDSS	·	2.0 km	MPC · JPL
469489	2002 TM_{356}	—	October 10, 2002	Apache Point	SDSS	·	690 m	MPC · JPL
469490	2002 TQ_{363}	—	October 10, 2002	Apache Point	SDSS	·	570 m	MPC · JPL
469491	2002 VL_{63}	—	November 6, 2002	Anderson Mesa	LONEOS	·	2.9 km	MPC · JPL
469492	2002 VV_{143}	—	November 4, 2002	Palomar	NEAT	·	830 m	MPC · JPL
469493	2002 XG_{10}	—	December 2, 2002	Haleakala	NEAT	·	740 m	MPC · JPL
469494	2002 XS_{40}	—	December 12, 2002	Palomar	NEAT	APO	760 m	MPC · JPL
469495	2002 XE_{51}	—	December 10, 2002	Socorro	LINEAR	·	950 m	MPC · JPL
469496	2002 XU_{58}	—	December 6, 2002	Socorro	LINEAR	·	1.3 km	MPC · JPL
469497	2002 XO_{61}	—	December 10, 2002	Palomar	NEAT	·	1.8 km	MPC · JPL
469498	2002 YS_{11}	—	December 31, 2002	Socorro	LINEAR	·	1.9 km	MPC · JPL
469499	2002 YD_{15}	—	December 31, 2002	Kitt Peak	Spacewatch	·	1.1 km	MPC · JPL
469500	2003 AV_{94}	—	January 4, 2003	Kitt Peak	Spacewatch	·	3.2 km	MPC · JPL

== 469501–469600 ==
back to top

Designation			Discovery			Properties		Ref
Permanent	Provisional	Named after	Date	Site	Discoverer(s)	Category	Diam.	Ref
469501	2003 BJ_{14}	—	January 26, 2003	Haleakala	NEAT	EUN	1.3 km	MPC · JPL
469502	2003 BZ_{20}	—	January 27, 2003	Socorro	LINEAR	·	450 m	MPC · JPL
469503	2003 DY_{9}	—	February 23, 2003	Socorro	LINEAR	·	1.4 km	MPC · JPL
469504	2003 FO	—	March 22, 2003	Palomar	NEAT	·	1.3 km	MPC · JPL
469505	2003 FE_{128}	—	March 31, 2003	Kitt Peak	M. W. Buie	twotino · moon	152 km	MPC · JPL
469506	2003 FF_{128}	—	March 31, 2003	Kitt Peak	M. W. Buie	plutino	131 km	MPC · JPL
469507	2003 HK_{8}	—	April 25, 2003	Kitt Peak	Spacewatch	·	3.9 km	MPC · JPL
469508	2003 HM_{50}	—	April 29, 2003	Socorro	LINEAR	·	1.7 km	MPC · JPL
469509	2003 HC_{57}	—	April 26, 2003	Mauna Kea	Mauna Kea	cubewano (cold) · moon	223 km	MPC · JPL
469510	2003 MJ_{9}	—	June 30, 2003	Socorro	LINEAR	·	2.0 km	MPC · JPL
469511	2003 OX_{13}	—	July 29, 2003	Reedy Creek	J. Broughton	·	2.8 km	MPC · JPL
469512	2003 QC_{7}	—	August 20, 2003	Campo Imperatore	CINEOS	·	1.5 km	MPC · JPL
469513	2003 QR_{79}	—	August 28, 2003	Socorro	LINEAR	APO	300 m	MPC · JPL
469514	2003 QA_{91}	—	August 24, 2003	Cerro Tololo	M. W. Buie	cubewano (cold) · moon	209 km	MPC · JPL
469515	2003 RJ_{2}	—	September 1, 2003	Socorro	LINEAR	H	550 m	MPC · JPL
469516	2003 RZ_{23}	—	September 3, 2003	Socorro	LINEAR	·	570 m	MPC · JPL
469517	2003 SA_{10}	—	September 17, 2003	Kitt Peak	Spacewatch	·	1.6 km	MPC · JPL
469518	2003 SE_{26}	—	September 2, 2003	Socorro	LINEAR	·	1.9 km	MPC · JPL
469519	2003 SB_{38}	—	September 16, 2003	Palomar	NEAT	JUN	970 m	MPC · JPL
469520	2003 ST_{38}	—	September 16, 2003	Palomar	NEAT	·	1.8 km	MPC · JPL
469521	2003 SM_{42}	—	September 16, 2003	Anderson Mesa	LONEOS	·	1.9 km	MPC · JPL
469522	2003 SG_{45}	—	September 18, 2003	Kitt Peak	Spacewatch	ADE	2.0 km	MPC · JPL
469523	2003 SX_{68}	—	September 17, 2003	Kitt Peak	Spacewatch	·	1.6 km	MPC · JPL
469524	2003 SU_{78}	—	September 18, 2003	Kitt Peak	Spacewatch	·	1.7 km	MPC · JPL
469525	2003 SF_{104}	—	September 20, 2003	Haleakala	NEAT	·	560 m	MPC · JPL
469526	2003 SD_{105}	—	September 20, 2003	Palomar	NEAT	ADE	2.5 km	MPC · JPL
469527	2003 ST_{156}	—	September 21, 2003	Kitt Peak	Spacewatch	·	550 m	MPC · JPL
469528	2003 SS_{163}	—	September 20, 2003	Anderson Mesa	LONEOS	·	620 m	MPC · JPL
469529	2003 SU_{190}	—	September 17, 2003	Kitt Peak	Spacewatch	·	650 m	MPC · JPL
469530	2003 SN_{209}	—	September 24, 2003	Kvistaberg	Uppsala-DLR Asteroid Survey	·	1.3 km	MPC · JPL
469531	2003 SK_{253}	—	September 17, 2003	Kitt Peak	Spacewatch	·	1.2 km	MPC · JPL
469532	2003 SD_{276}	—	September 18, 2003	Kitt Peak	Spacewatch	·	1.4 km	MPC · JPL
469533	2003 SK_{276}	—	September 22, 2003	Kitt Peak	Spacewatch	·	1.8 km	MPC · JPL
469534	2003 SW_{287}	—	September 18, 2003	Kitt Peak	Spacewatch	·	1.2 km	MPC · JPL
469535	2003 SB_{294}	—	September 28, 2003	Socorro	LINEAR	·	2.3 km	MPC · JPL
469536	2003 SZ_{294}	—	September 21, 2003	Socorro	LINEAR	·	2.1 km	MPC · JPL
469537	2003 SZ_{298}	—	October 2, 2003	Socorro	LINEAR	·	1.8 km	MPC · JPL
469538	2003 SF_{303}	—	September 17, 2003	Palomar	NEAT	·	2.3 km	MPC · JPL
469539	2003 SD_{323}	—	September 16, 2003	Kitt Peak	Spacewatch	·	1.3 km	MPC · JPL
469540	2003 SK_{323}	—	September 16, 2003	Kitt Peak	Spacewatch	·	1.3 km	MPC · JPL
469541	2003 SD_{331}	—	September 26, 2003	Apache Point	SDSS	·	650 m	MPC · JPL
469542	2003 SS_{331}	—	September 27, 2003	Kitt Peak	Spacewatch	·	1.4 km	MPC · JPL
469543	2003 SP_{333}	—	September 18, 2003	Kitt Peak	Spacewatch	CYB	2.9 km	MPC · JPL
469544	2003 SA_{344}	—	September 17, 2003	Kitt Peak	Spacewatch	·	1.5 km	MPC · JPL
469545	2003 SZ_{427}	—	September 16, 2003	Kitt Peak	Spacewatch	·	1.2 km	MPC · JPL
469546	2003 SX_{432}	—	September 21, 2003	Kitt Peak	Spacewatch	NEM	1.7 km	MPC · JPL
469547	2003 SH_{433}	—	September 28, 2003	Kitt Peak	Spacewatch	·	770 m	MPC · JPL
469548	2003 TD_{20}	—	September 21, 2003	Socorro	LINEAR	·	1.2 km	MPC · JPL
469549	2003 UW_{10}	—	October 20, 2003	Socorro	LINEAR	JUN	1.2 km	MPC · JPL
469550	2003 UZ_{58}	—	October 16, 2003	Palomar	NEAT	·	2.1 km	MPC · JPL
469551	2003 UW_{77}	—	October 17, 2003	Kitt Peak	Spacewatch	·	1.8 km	MPC · JPL
469552	2003 UR_{83}	—	October 17, 2003	Anderson Mesa	LONEOS	·	840 m	MPC · JPL
469553	2003 UB_{86}	—	October 18, 2003	Palomar	NEAT	·	2.1 km	MPC · JPL
469554	2003 UN_{93}	—	October 17, 2003	Kitt Peak	Spacewatch	ADE	1.8 km	MPC · JPL
469555	2003 UC_{102}	—	October 20, 2003	Socorro	LINEAR	·	710 m	MPC · JPL
469556	2003 UE_{108}	—	October 19, 2003	Kitt Peak	Spacewatch	·	1.8 km	MPC · JPL
469557	2003 UZ_{130}	—	October 19, 2003	Palomar	NEAT	·	1.7 km	MPC · JPL
469558	2003 UY_{132}	—	October 19, 2003	Palomar	NEAT	·	2.0 km	MPC · JPL
469559	2003 UA_{183}	—	September 22, 2003	Kitt Peak	Spacewatch	·	1.5 km	MPC · JPL
469560	2003 UE_{189}	—	October 22, 2003	Kitt Peak	Spacewatch	·	2.3 km	MPC · JPL
469561	2003 UB_{252}	—	September 20, 2003	Campo Imperatore	CINEOS	·	1.6 km	MPC · JPL
469562	2003 UH_{295}	—	October 16, 2003	Kitt Peak	Spacewatch	·	1.5 km	MPC · JPL
469563	2003 UZ_{337}	—	October 18, 2003	Apache Point	SDSS	ULA · CYB	4.4 km	MPC · JPL
469564	2003 UK_{378}	—	October 22, 2003	Apache Point	SDSS	·	1.1 km	MPC · JPL
469565	2003 VC_{3}	—	November 15, 2003	Kitt Peak	Spacewatch	·	3.4 km	MPC · JPL
469566	2003 VE_{3}	—	November 15, 2003	Kitt Peak	Spacewatch	·	2.1 km	MPC · JPL
469567	2003 VG_{10}	—	November 15, 2003	Palomar	NEAT	·	2.3 km	MPC · JPL
469568	2003 WL_{6}	—	November 16, 2003	Kitt Peak	Spacewatch	·	1.8 km	MPC · JPL
469569	2003 WU_{24}	—	November 20, 2003	Socorro	LINEAR	H	640 m	MPC · JPL
469570	2003 WO_{29}	—	October 18, 2003	Kitt Peak	Spacewatch	·	2.0 km	MPC · JPL
469571	2003 WU_{44}	—	November 19, 2003	Palomar	NEAT	·	2.3 km	MPC · JPL
469572	2003 WU_{56}	—	November 21, 2003	Socorro	LINEAR	H	670 m	MPC · JPL
469573	2003 WD_{93}	—	November 19, 2003	Kitt Peak	Spacewatch	·	1.8 km	MPC · JPL
469574	2003 WV_{100}	—	November 21, 2003	Palomar	NEAT	·	2.1 km	MPC · JPL
469575	2003 WE_{106}	—	November 21, 2003	Kitt Peak	Spacewatch	AGN	930 m	MPC · JPL
469576	2003 WE_{111}	—	October 24, 2003	Socorro	LINEAR	·	1.9 km	MPC · JPL
469577	2003 WN_{119}	—	November 20, 2003	Socorro	LINEAR	·	1.8 km	MPC · JPL
469578	2003 WN_{165}	—	November 24, 2003	Kitt Peak	Spacewatch	DOR	2.0 km	MPC · JPL
469579	2003 YV	—	December 17, 2003	Socorro	LINEAR	H	750 m	MPC · JPL
469580	2003 YZ_{9}	—	November 19, 2003	Socorro	LINEAR	·	2.0 km	MPC · JPL
469581	2003 YU_{35}	—	December 19, 2003	Socorro	LINEAR	·	2.6 km	MPC · JPL
469582	2003 YA_{118}	—	December 1, 2003	Socorro	LINEAR	PHO	1.1 km	MPC · JPL
469583	2003 YZ_{153}	—	December 29, 2003	Catalina	CSS	·	2.3 km	MPC · JPL
469584	2003 YW_{179}	—	December 24, 2003	Mauna Kea	Mauna Kea	res · 3:5	143 km	MPC · JPL
469585	2004 AE_{10}	—	January 15, 2004	Kitt Peak	Spacewatch	H	660 m	MPC · JPL
469586	2004 BL_{10}	—	January 17, 2004	Kitt Peak	Spacewatch	·	2.2 km	MPC · JPL
469587	2004 BV_{26}	—	January 18, 2004	Palomar	NEAT	H	620 m	MPC · JPL
469588	2004 CQ_{8}	—	January 30, 2004	Kitt Peak	Spacewatch	·	2.4 km	MPC · JPL
469589	2004 CX_{31}	—	January 30, 2004	Kitt Peak	Spacewatch	·	2.4 km	MPC · JPL
469590	2004 DG_{20}	—	February 19, 2004	Socorro	LINEAR	PHO	860 m	MPC · JPL
469591	2004 DU_{21}	—	February 17, 2004	Catalina	CSS	T_{j} (2.99)	1.7 km	MPC · JPL
469592	2004 DO_{57}	—	February 23, 2004	Socorro	LINEAR	·	2.3 km	MPC · JPL
469593	2004 DH_{65}	—	February 22, 2004	Kitt Peak	M. W. Buie	H	560 m	MPC · JPL
469594	2004 EV_{69}	—	February 26, 2004	Socorro	LINEAR	NYS	1.2 km	MPC · JPL
469595	2004 ET_{78}	—	February 25, 2004	Socorro	LINEAR	ADE	2.1 km	MPC · JPL
469596	2004 EE_{88}	—	March 14, 2004	Kitt Peak	Spacewatch	·	900 m	MPC · JPL
469597	2004 EN_{93}	—	March 15, 2004	Kitt Peak	Spacewatch	·	1.1 km	MPC · JPL
469598	2004 FY_{23}	—	March 17, 2004	Kitt Peak	Spacewatch	·	1.2 km	MPC · JPL
469599	2004 FT_{27}	—	March 17, 2004	Kitt Peak	Spacewatch	·	950 m	MPC · JPL
469600	2004 FV_{55}	—	March 20, 2004	Socorro	LINEAR	·	1.2 km	MPC · JPL

== 469601–469700 ==
back to top

Designation			Discovery			Properties		Ref
Permanent	Provisional	Named after	Date	Site	Discoverer(s)	Category	Diam.	Ref
469601	2004 FB_{78}	—	March 15, 2004	Kitt Peak	Spacewatch	·	3.1 km	MPC · JPL
469602	2004 FU_{146}	—	March 16, 2004	Kitt Peak	Spacewatch	·	1.6 km	MPC · JPL
469603	2004 GC_{10}	—	April 12, 2004	Palomar	NEAT	·	1.5 km	MPC · JPL
469604	2004 GK_{13}	—	April 12, 2004	Siding Spring	SSS	·	1.4 km	MPC · JPL
469605	2004 GM_{19}	—	April 14, 2004	Socorro	LINEAR	T_{j} (2.96)	3.0 km	MPC · JPL
469606	2004 GO_{40}	—	April 12, 2004	Kitt Peak	Spacewatch	EOS	2.0 km	MPC · JPL
469607	2004 GX_{53}	—	April 13, 2004	Kitt Peak	Spacewatch	PHO	680 m	MPC · JPL
469608	2004 HV_{23}	—	April 16, 2004	Kitt Peak	Spacewatch	·	1.0 km	MPC · JPL
469609	2004 HS_{78}	—	April 22, 2004	Apache Point	SDSS	·	4.4 km	MPC · JPL
469610	2004 HF_{79}	—	April 24, 2004	Mauna Kea	CFHT Legacy Survey	cubewano (cold) · moon	176 km	MPC · JPL
469611	2004 JN_{29}	—	May 15, 2004	Socorro	LINEAR	·	1.3 km	MPC · JPL
469612	2004 KP_{17}	—	May 28, 2004	Socorro	LINEAR	T_{j} (2.96)	1.9 km	MPC · JPL
469613	2004 LB_{14}	—	June 11, 2004	Kitt Peak	Spacewatch	·	830 m	MPC · JPL
469614	2004 NG_{30}	—	July 15, 2004	Siding Spring	SSS	PHO	1.0 km	MPC · JPL
469615	2004 PT_{107}	—	August 13, 2004	Cerro Tololo	M. W. Buie	cubewano (hot)	400 km	MPC · JPL
469616	2004 QY_{9}	—	August 21, 2004	Siding Spring	SSS	·	1.1 km	MPC · JPL
469617	2004 QO_{15}	—	August 23, 2004	Kitt Peak	Spacewatch	·	900 m	MPC · JPL
469618	2004 QM_{28}	—	August 25, 2004	Kitt Peak	Spacewatch	·	920 m	MPC · JPL
469619	2004 RR_{42}	—	September 8, 2004	Campo Imperatore	CINEOS	·	1.0 km	MPC · JPL
469620	2004 RW_{71}	—	September 8, 2004	Socorro	LINEAR	·	1.2 km	MPC · JPL
469621	2004 RV_{93}	—	September 8, 2004	Socorro	LINEAR	·	890 m	MPC · JPL
469622	2004 RT_{158}	—	September 10, 2004	Socorro	LINEAR	·	690 m	MPC · JPL
469623	2004 RC_{163}	—	September 11, 2004	Kitt Peak	Spacewatch	·	800 m	MPC · JPL
469624	2004 RA_{167}	—	September 7, 2004	Kitt Peak	Spacewatch	·	760 m	MPC · JPL
469625	2004 RH_{198}	—	September 10, 2004	Socorro	LINEAR	·	1.3 km	MPC · JPL
469626	2004 RZ_{230}	—	September 9, 2004	Kitt Peak	Spacewatch	·	1.4 km	MPC · JPL
469627	2004 RB_{253}	—	September 15, 2004	Socorro	LINEAR	·	1.9 km	MPC · JPL
469628	2004 RH_{273}	—	September 11, 2004	Kitt Peak	Spacewatch	·	1.0 km	MPC · JPL
469629	2004 RB_{301}	—	September 11, 2004	Kitt Peak	Spacewatch	(5)	990 m	MPC · JPL
469630	2004 RV_{305}	—	September 12, 2004	Socorro	LINEAR	·	2.3 km	MPC · JPL
469631	2004 RR_{336}	—	September 15, 2004	Kitt Peak	Spacewatch	·	710 m	MPC · JPL
469632	2004 RL_{338}	—	September 15, 2004	Kitt Peak	Spacewatch	(5)	1.1 km	MPC · JPL
469633	2004 RE_{340}	—	August 22, 2004	Kitt Peak	Spacewatch	·	2.3 km	MPC · JPL
469634	2004 SZ_{19}	—	September 21, 2004	Socorro	LINEAR	AMO	530 m	MPC · JPL
469635	2004 SD_{23}	—	September 7, 2004	Kitt Peak	Spacewatch	·	1.2 km	MPC · JPL
469636	2004 SE_{54}	—	September 22, 2004	Goodricke-Pigott	R. A. Tucker	·	1.4 km	MPC · JPL
469637	2004 TX_{4}	—	October 4, 2004	Kitt Peak	Spacewatch	·	3.0 km	MPC · JPL
469638	2004 TK_{7}	—	October 5, 2004	Socorro	LINEAR	·	860 m	MPC · JPL
469639	2004 TS_{13}	—	October 10, 2004	Pla D'Arguines	D'Arguines, Pla	·	2.3 km	MPC · JPL
469640	2004 TC_{19}	—	October 12, 2004	Socorro	LINEAR	·	870 m	MPC · JPL
469641	2004 TH_{34}	—	September 9, 2004	Kitt Peak	Spacewatch	·	2.9 km	MPC · JPL
469642	2004 TH_{56}	—	September 9, 2004	Campo Imperatore	CINEOS	JUN	1.0 km	MPC · JPL
469643	2004 TN_{62}	—	October 5, 2004	Kitt Peak	Spacewatch	·	1.0 km	MPC · JPL
469644	2004 TP_{82}	—	October 5, 2004	Kitt Peak	Spacewatch	MRX	740 m	MPC · JPL
469645	2004 TD_{88}	—	October 5, 2004	Kitt Peak	Spacewatch	EUN	1.5 km	MPC · JPL
469646	2004 TN_{88}	—	October 5, 2004	Kitt Peak	Spacewatch	KOR	1.3 km	MPC · JPL
469647	2004 TC_{94}	—	September 7, 2004	Kitt Peak	Spacewatch	·	1.4 km	MPC · JPL
469648	2004 TO_{101}	—	October 6, 2004	Kitt Peak	Spacewatch	·	1.2 km	MPC · JPL
469649	2004 TK_{104}	—	September 15, 2004	Kitt Peak	Spacewatch	·	2.3 km	MPC · JPL
469650	2004 TD_{141}	—	September 13, 2004	Socorro	LINEAR	·	1.7 km	MPC · JPL
469651	2004 TU_{144}	—	October 4, 2004	Kitt Peak	Spacewatch	·	2.3 km	MPC · JPL
469652	2004 TK_{149}	—	September 23, 2004	Kitt Peak	Spacewatch	·	2.0 km	MPC · JPL
469653	2004 TP_{149}	—	October 6, 2004	Kitt Peak	Spacewatch	·	910 m	MPC · JPL
469654	2004 TF_{155}	—	October 6, 2004	Kitt Peak	Spacewatch	·	2.7 km	MPC · JPL
469655	2004 TK_{156}	—	October 6, 2004	Kitt Peak	Spacewatch	(5)	870 m	MPC · JPL
469656	2004 TS_{159}	—	October 6, 2004	Kitt Peak	Spacewatch	(5)	1.0 km	MPC · JPL
469657	2004 TU_{183}	—	October 7, 2004	Kitt Peak	Spacewatch	EUN	980 m	MPC · JPL
469658	2004 TQ_{196}	—	September 22, 2004	Desert Eagle	W. K. Y. Yeung	·	1.1 km	MPC · JPL
469659	2004 TL_{200}	—	October 7, 2004	Kitt Peak	Spacewatch	·	1.2 km	MPC · JPL
469660	2004 TN_{233}	—	October 8, 2004	Socorro	LINEAR	MAR	1.3 km	MPC · JPL
469661	2004 TB_{291}	—	September 23, 2004	Kitt Peak	Spacewatch	·	1.6 km	MPC · JPL
469662	2004 TC_{291}	—	October 10, 2004	Socorro	LINEAR	·	1.2 km	MPC · JPL
469663	2004 TT_{299}	—	October 8, 2004	Kitt Peak	Spacewatch	·	1.0 km	MPC · JPL
469664	2004 TM_{318}	—	October 11, 2004	Kitt Peak	Spacewatch	NYS	1.3 km	MPC · JPL
469665	2004 TS_{345}	—	October 14, 2004	Palomar	NEAT	·	970 m	MPC · JPL
469666	2004 TV_{348}	—	October 7, 2004	Kitt Peak	Spacewatch	(5)	890 m	MPC · JPL
469667	2004 TT_{361}	—	October 13, 2004	Kitt Peak	Spacewatch	·	1.2 km	MPC · JPL
469668	2004 TF_{367}	—	October 6, 2004	Kitt Peak	Spacewatch	·	680 m	MPC · JPL
469669	2004 VP_{8}	—	November 3, 2004	Anderson Mesa	LONEOS	·	960 m	MPC · JPL
469670	2004 VJ_{12}	—	November 3, 2004	Palomar	NEAT	(5)	1.1 km	MPC · JPL
469671	2004 VN_{15}	—	October 15, 2004	Kitt Peak	Spacewatch	·	3.4 km	MPC · JPL
469672	2004 XE_{2}	—	December 1, 2004	Catalina	CSS	·	1.3 km	MPC · JPL
469673	2004 XJ_{18}	—	December 8, 2004	Socorro	LINEAR	·	1.1 km	MPC · JPL
469674	2004 XK_{21}	—	December 8, 2004	Socorro	LINEAR	·	1.2 km	MPC · JPL
469675	2004 XB_{33}	—	December 10, 2004	Socorro	LINEAR	·	1.9 km	MPC · JPL
469676	2004 XW_{49}	—	December 10, 2004	Kitt Peak	Spacewatch	·	2.1 km	MPC · JPL
469677	2004 XR_{65}	—	December 2, 2004	Socorro	LINEAR	·	1.3 km	MPC · JPL
469678	2004 XC_{72}	—	December 14, 2004	Catalina	CSS	·	2.2 km	MPC · JPL
469679	2004 XU_{88}	—	December 10, 2004	Socorro	LINEAR	(5)	1.1 km	MPC · JPL
469680	2004 XC_{92}	—	December 11, 2004	Socorro	LINEAR	·	1.0 km	MPC · JPL
469681	2004 XZ_{98}	—	December 11, 2004	Kitt Peak	Spacewatch	·	780 m	MPC · JPL
469682	2004 XL_{103}	—	December 9, 2004	Kitt Peak	Spacewatch	·	1.3 km	MPC · JPL
469683	2004 XE_{130}	—	December 15, 2004	Socorro	LINEAR	·	1.1 km	MPC · JPL
469684	2004 XY_{169}	—	November 4, 2004	Catalina	CSS	·	3.3 km	MPC · JPL
469685	2004 XQ_{170}	—	December 9, 2004	Catalina	CSS	(1547)	1.8 km	MPC · JPL
469686	2004 XV_{177}	—	November 9, 2004	Catalina	CSS	·	1.8 km	MPC · JPL
469687	2004 YF_{9}	—	December 18, 2004	Mount Lemmon	Mount Lemmon Survey	·	2.4 km	MPC · JPL
469688	2005 AL_{5}	—	January 6, 2005	Catalina	CSS	·	2.1 km	MPC · JPL
469689	2005 AX_{16}	—	January 6, 2005	Socorro	LINEAR	·	1.7 km	MPC · JPL
469690	2005 AJ_{27}	—	January 13, 2005	Kitt Peak	Spacewatch	H	460 m	MPC · JPL
469691	2005 AO_{44}	—	January 15, 2005	Kitt Peak	Spacewatch	·	2.0 km	MPC · JPL
469692	2005 AY_{44}	—	January 15, 2005	Kitt Peak	Spacewatch	·	1.4 km	MPC · JPL
469693	2005 BY_{13}	—	December 20, 2004	Mount Lemmon	Mount Lemmon Survey	EUN	1.5 km	MPC · JPL
469694	2005 BH_{24}	—	January 17, 2005	Catalina	CSS	·	1.8 km	MPC · JPL
469695	2005 CN_{12}	—	January 13, 2005	Kitt Peak	Spacewatch	·	2.3 km	MPC · JPL
469696	2005 CO_{62}	—	February 9, 2005	Anderson Mesa	LONEOS	·	2.4 km	MPC · JPL
469697	2005 CR_{62}	—	February 1, 2005	Kitt Peak	Spacewatch	PHO	930 m	MPC · JPL
469698	2005 EH_{33}	—	March 4, 2005	Socorro	LINEAR	H	610 m	MPC · JPL
469699	2005 EP_{68}	—	March 7, 2005	Socorro	LINEAR	·	1.8 km	MPC · JPL
469700	2005 EE_{195}	—	March 11, 2005	Mount Lemmon	Mount Lemmon Survey	KOR	1.4 km	MPC · JPL

== 469701–469800 ==
back to top

Designation			Discovery			Properties		Ref
Permanent	Provisional	Named after	Date	Site	Discoverer(s)	Category	Diam.	Ref
469701	2005 EL_{206}	—	March 13, 2005	Catalina	CSS	H	560 m	MPC · JPL
469702	2005 EO_{246}	—	March 1, 2005	Kitt Peak	Spacewatch	·	1.8 km	MPC · JPL
469703	2005 EN_{253}	—	March 3, 2005	Kitt Peak	Spacewatch	·	680 m	MPC · JPL
469704	2005 EZ_{296}	—	March 9, 2005	Kitt Peak	M. W. Buie	plutino	184 km	MPC · JPL
469705 ǂKá̦gára	2005 EF_{298}	ǂKá̦gára	March 11, 2005	Kitt Peak	M. W. Buie	cubewano (cold) · moon	138 km	MPC · JPL
469706	2005 GR_{96}	—	April 6, 2005	Mount Lemmon	Mount Lemmon Survey	·	650 m	MPC · JPL
469707	2005 GB_{187}	—	April 10, 2005	Kitt Peak	M. W. Buie	plutino	174 km	MPC · JPL
469708	2005 GE_{187}	—	April 12, 2005	Kitt Peak	M. W. Buie	plutino	150 km	MPC · JPL
469709	2005 JY_{9}	—	May 4, 2005	Mauna Kea	Veillet, C.	KOR	1.2 km	MPC · JPL
469710	2005 JM_{45}	—	April 1, 2005	Catalina	CSS	·	1.1 km	MPC · JPL
469711	2005 JJ_{51}	—	May 4, 2005	Kitt Peak	Spacewatch	·	1.1 km	MPC · JPL
469712	2005 JN_{53}	—	May 4, 2005	Mount Lemmon	Mount Lemmon Survey	KOR	1.3 km	MPC · JPL
469713	2005 JK_{56}	—	May 6, 2005	Kitt Peak	Spacewatch	·	2.8 km	MPC · JPL
469714	2005 JQ_{122}	—	May 11, 2005	Kitt Peak	Spacewatch	·	2.2 km	MPC · JPL
469715	2005 JB_{132}	—	May 13, 2005	Kitt Peak	Spacewatch	·	1.5 km	MPC · JPL
469716	2005 JP_{150}	—	April 2, 2005	Kitt Peak	Spacewatch	(18466)	2.7 km	MPC · JPL
469717	2005 LR_{4}	—	May 12, 2005	Campo Imperatore	CINEOS	PHO	680 m	MPC · JPL
469718	2005 LK_{10}	—	June 3, 2005	Kitt Peak	Spacewatch	·	550 m	MPC · JPL
469719	2005 LE_{13}	—	May 16, 2005	Mount Lemmon	Mount Lemmon Survey	·	1.0 km	MPC · JPL
469720	2005 LK_{22}	—	June 8, 2005	Kitt Peak	Spacewatch	NYS	790 m	MPC · JPL
469721	2005 LX_{37}	—	May 3, 2005	Kitt Peak	Spacewatch	·	650 m	MPC · JPL
469722	2005 LP_{40}	—	June 14, 2005	Socorro	LINEAR	APO	460 m	MPC · JPL
469723	2005 MS_{23}	—	June 13, 2005	Mount Lemmon	Mount Lemmon Survey	V	650 m	MPC · JPL
469724	2005 MC_{44}	—	June 27, 2005	Palomar	NEAT	T_{j} (2.99)	2.7 km	MPC · JPL
469725	2005 MM_{53}	—	June 17, 2005	Mount Lemmon	Mount Lemmon Survey	NYS	900 m	MPC · JPL
469726	2005 MG_{54}	—	June 29, 2005	Palomar	NEAT	·	2.6 km	MPC · JPL
469727	2005 NK_{1}	—	July 3, 2005	Mount Lemmon	Mount Lemmon Survey	APO +1km	1.3 km	MPC · JPL
469728	2005 NM_{8}	—	June 18, 2005	Mount Lemmon	Mount Lemmon Survey	·	2.9 km	MPC · JPL
469729	2005 NY_{8}	—	June 18, 2005	Mount Lemmon	Mount Lemmon Survey	·	2.2 km	MPC · JPL
469730	2005 ND_{9}	—	July 1, 2005	Kitt Peak	Spacewatch	V	740 m	MPC · JPL
469731	2005 NO_{17}	—	July 3, 2005	Mount Lemmon	Mount Lemmon Survey	MAS	670 m	MPC · JPL
469732	2005 NV_{21}	—	July 1, 2005	Kitt Peak	Spacewatch	·	920 m	MPC · JPL
469733	2005 NE_{24}	—	July 4, 2005	Kitt Peak	Spacewatch	·	1.0 km	MPC · JPL
469734	2005 NC_{30}	—	June 13, 2005	Mount Lemmon	Mount Lemmon Survey	·	2.8 km	MPC · JPL
469735	2005 NO_{35}	—	July 5, 2005	Kitt Peak	Spacewatch	·	1.7 km	MPC · JPL
469736	2005 NB_{42}	—	July 5, 2005	Kitt Peak	Spacewatch	·	2.5 km	MPC · JPL
469737	2005 NW_{44}	—	July 10, 2005	Catalina	CSS	ATE	300 m	MPC · JPL
469738	2005 NH_{55}	—	July 10, 2005	Kitt Peak	Spacewatch	·	750 m	MPC · JPL
469739	2005 NK_{72}	—	July 6, 2005	Kitt Peak	Spacewatch	·	2.1 km	MPC · JPL
469740	2005 NO_{73}	—	June 18, 2005	Mount Lemmon	Mount Lemmon Survey	EOS	1.7 km	MPC · JPL
469741	2005 NV_{101}	—	July 12, 2005	Mount Lemmon	Mount Lemmon Survey	MAS	660 m	MPC · JPL
469742	2005 NV_{105}	—	July 7, 2005	Mauna Kea	Veillet, C.	·	2.0 km	MPC · JPL
469743	2005 NM_{116}	—	July 7, 2005	Mauna Kea	Veillet, C.	EOS	1.7 km	MPC · JPL
469744	2005 NC_{117}	—	July 7, 2005	Mauna Kea	Veillet, C.	·	1.7 km	MPC · JPL
469745	2005 OQ_{2}	—	July 29, 2005	Socorro	LINEAR	·	4.4 km	MPC · JPL
469746	2005 OX_{4}	—	July 28, 2005	Palomar	NEAT	·	2.8 km	MPC · JPL
469747	2005 PE_{4}	—	August 6, 2005	Siding Spring	SSS	T_{j} (2.96)	5.4 km	MPC · JPL
469748 Volnay	2005 PO_{5}	Volnay	August 9, 2005	Vicques	M. Ory	·	1.3 km	MPC · JPL
469749	2005 PD_{6}	—	August 10, 2005	Saint-Sulpice	Saint-Sulpice	MAS	560 m	MPC · JPL
469750	2005 PU_{21}	—	August 9, 2005	Cerro Tololo	Cerro Tololo	centaur	282 km	MPC · JPL
469751	2005 QC_{4}	—	August 24, 2005	Palomar	NEAT	·	2.3 km	MPC · JPL
469752	2005 QF_{10}	—	August 25, 2005	Campo Imperatore	CINEOS	MAS	640 m	MPC · JPL
469753	2005 QQ_{13}	—	August 24, 2005	Palomar	NEAT	·	2.8 km	MPC · JPL
469754	2005 QX_{13}	—	August 24, 2005	Palomar	NEAT	·	970 m	MPC · JPL
469755	2005 QB_{21}	—	August 26, 2005	Anderson Mesa	LONEOS	NYS	1.4 km	MPC · JPL
469756	2005 QT_{21}	—	August 26, 2005	Campo Imperatore	CINEOS	NYS	1.1 km	MPC · JPL
469757	2005 QQ_{26}	—	August 27, 2005	Kitt Peak	Spacewatch	·	2.7 km	MPC · JPL
469758	2005 QQ_{28}	—	August 28, 2005	Vicques	M. Ory	·	4.5 km	MPC · JPL
469759	2005 QM_{29}	—	August 26, 2005	Palomar	NEAT	·	910 m	MPC · JPL
469760	2005 QT_{34}	—	August 25, 2005	Palomar	NEAT	·	970 m	MPC · JPL
469761	2005 QJ_{42}	—	August 26, 2005	Anderson Mesa	LONEOS	·	4.8 km	MPC · JPL
469762	2005 QK_{44}	—	August 26, 2005	Palomar	NEAT	·	940 m	MPC · JPL
469763	2005 QH_{45}	—	August 26, 2005	Palomar	NEAT	·	1.2 km	MPC · JPL
469764	2005 QZ_{45}	—	June 17, 2005	Mount Lemmon	Mount Lemmon Survey	·	980 m	MPC · JPL
469765	2005 QD_{46}	—	August 26, 2005	Palomar	NEAT	·	1.1 km	MPC · JPL
469766	2005 QE_{46}	—	August 26, 2005	Palomar	NEAT	MAS	660 m	MPC · JPL
469767	2005 QM_{47}	—	August 26, 2005	Palomar	NEAT	·	1.3 km	MPC · JPL
469768	2005 QR_{47}	—	August 26, 2005	Palomar	NEAT	·	3.5 km	MPC · JPL
469769	2005 QL_{53}	—	August 28, 2005	Kitt Peak	Spacewatch	·	1.3 km	MPC · JPL
469770	2005 QE_{57}	—	July 6, 2005	Kitt Peak	Spacewatch	·	2.4 km	MPC · JPL
469771	2005 QD_{68}	—	August 28, 2005	Siding Spring	SSS	·	920 m	MPC · JPL
469772	2005 QY_{69}	—	August 29, 2005	Socorro	LINEAR	·	2.8 km	MPC · JPL
469773 Kitaibel	2005 QB_{76}	Kitaibel	August 30, 2005	Piszkéstető	K. Sárneczky, Z. Kuli	·	1.0 km	MPC · JPL
469774	2005 QB_{81}	—	August 29, 2005	Kitt Peak	Spacewatch	·	2.4 km	MPC · JPL
469775	2005 QD_{82}	—	August 29, 2005	Anderson Mesa	LONEOS	·	1.2 km	MPC · JPL
469776	2005 QR_{90}	—	August 25, 2005	Palomar	NEAT	THM	2.5 km	MPC · JPL
469777	2005 QJ_{128}	—	August 28, 2005	Kitt Peak	Spacewatch	MAS	710 m	MPC · JPL
469778	2005 QZ_{130}	—	August 28, 2005	Kitt Peak	Spacewatch	NYS	1.1 km	MPC · JPL
469779	2005 QJ_{134}	—	August 28, 2005	Kitt Peak	Spacewatch	·	2.4 km	MPC · JPL
469780	2005 QO_{134}	—	August 28, 2005	Kitt Peak	Spacewatch	·	2.3 km	MPC · JPL
469781	2005 QX_{135}	—	August 28, 2005	Kitt Peak	Spacewatch	MAS	630 m	MPC · JPL
469782	2005 QV_{136}	—	August 28, 2005	Kitt Peak	Spacewatch	MAS	590 m	MPC · JPL
469783	2005 QW_{162}	—	August 30, 2005	Palomar	NEAT	·	3.1 km	MPC · JPL
469784	2005 QK_{163}	—	August 30, 2005	Kitt Peak	Spacewatch	NYS	1.1 km	MPC · JPL
469785	2005 QF_{168}	—	August 29, 2005	Palomar	NEAT	·	2.9 km	MPC · JPL
469786	2005 QK_{176}	—	August 31, 2005	Kitt Peak	Spacewatch	NYS	1.1 km	MPC · JPL
469787	2005 QF_{181}	—	August 30, 2005	Kitt Peak	Spacewatch	·	3.1 km	MPC · JPL
469788	2005 QG_{181}	—	August 30, 2005	Kitt Peak	Spacewatch	MAS	670 m	MPC · JPL
469789	2005 RH_{1}	—	September 1, 2005	Palomar	NEAT	·	1.3 km	MPC · JPL
469790	2005 RH_{5}	—	September 7, 2005	Wildberg	R. Apitzsch	H	490 m	MPC · JPL
469791	2005 RC_{6}	—	August 29, 2005	Kitt Peak	Spacewatch	THB	3.0 km	MPC · JPL
469792	2005 RP_{10}	—	August 30, 2005	Socorro	LINEAR	·	1.4 km	MPC · JPL
469793	2005 RA_{17}	—	September 1, 2005	Kitt Peak	Spacewatch	·	1.7 km	MPC · JPL
469794	2005 RQ_{29}	—	September 13, 2005	Socorro	LINEAR	·	4.1 km	MPC · JPL
469795	2005 RC_{47}	—	September 14, 2005	Apache Point	A. C. Becker	·	1.3 km	MPC · JPL
469796	2005 SD	—	September 16, 2005	Socorro	LINEAR	T_{j} (2.92)	3.3 km	MPC · JPL
469797	2005 SX_{6}	—	September 23, 2005	Kitt Peak	Spacewatch	NYS	930 m	MPC · JPL
469798	2005 SL_{12}	—	September 11, 2005	Socorro	LINEAR	·	1.2 km	MPC · JPL
469799	2005 SH_{16}	—	September 26, 2005	Kitt Peak	Spacewatch	·	940 m	MPC · JPL
469800	2005 SZ_{23}	—	August 31, 2005	Palomar	NEAT	fast	2.8 km	MPC · JPL

== 469801–469900 ==
back to top

Designation			Discovery			Properties		Ref
Permanent	Provisional	Named after	Date	Site	Discoverer(s)	Category	Diam.	Ref
469801	2005 SO_{38}	—	September 24, 2005	Kitt Peak	Spacewatch	·	1 km	MPC · JPL
469802	2005 SL_{41}	—	September 24, 2005	Kitt Peak	Spacewatch	·	2.8 km	MPC · JPL
469803	2005 SD_{56}	—	September 25, 2005	Kitt Peak	Spacewatch	·	1.4 km	MPC · JPL
469804	2005 SU_{65}	—	September 26, 2005	Palomar	NEAT	·	3.2 km	MPC · JPL
469805	2005 SB_{77}	—	September 24, 2005	Kitt Peak	Spacewatch	·	960 m	MPC · JPL
469806	2005 SX_{78}	—	September 24, 2005	Kitt Peak	Spacewatch	·	2.4 km	MPC · JPL
469807	2005 SV_{80}	—	September 24, 2005	Kitt Peak	Spacewatch	·	1.1 km	MPC · JPL
469808	2005 SP_{83}	—	September 24, 2005	Kitt Peak	Spacewatch	NYS	1.2 km	MPC · JPL
469809	2005 ST_{86}	—	September 24, 2005	Kitt Peak	Spacewatch	·	1.2 km	MPC · JPL
469810	2005 SO_{94}	—	September 3, 2005	Catalina	CSS	TIR	2.7 km	MPC · JPL
469811	2005 SA_{116}	—	September 27, 2005	Kitt Peak	Spacewatch	NYS	1.1 km	MPC · JPL
469812	2005 SD_{118}	—	September 28, 2005	Palomar	NEAT	·	1.0 km	MPC · JPL
469813	2005 SP_{121}	—	September 29, 2005	Kitt Peak	Spacewatch	·	1.1 km	MPC · JPL
469814	2005 SZ_{139}	—	September 25, 2005	Kitt Peak	Spacewatch	·	2.1 km	MPC · JPL
469815	2005 SR_{140}	—	September 25, 2005	Kitt Peak	Spacewatch	·	4.0 km	MPC · JPL
469816	2005 SZ_{144}	—	September 25, 2005	Kitt Peak	Spacewatch	·	2.1 km	MPC · JPL
469817	2005 SR_{145}	—	September 25, 2005	Kitt Peak	Spacewatch	MAS	550 m	MPC · JPL
469818	2005 SF_{158}	—	September 26, 2005	Palomar	NEAT	NYS	920 m	MPC · JPL
469819	2005 SZ_{160}	—	September 27, 2005	Kitt Peak	Spacewatch	EOS	2.0 km	MPC · JPL
469820	2005 SB_{163}	—	September 27, 2005	Kitt Peak	Spacewatch	·	950 m	MPC · JPL
469821	2005 SN_{173}	—	September 29, 2005	Kitt Peak	Spacewatch	NYS	1.9 km	MPC · JPL
469822	2005 SU_{189}	—	September 29, 2005	Mount Lemmon	Mount Lemmon Survey	MAS	640 m	MPC · JPL
469823	2005 SR_{191}	—	September 29, 2005	Mount Lemmon	Mount Lemmon Survey	·	1.1 km	MPC · JPL
469824	2005 SN_{195}	—	September 30, 2005	Kitt Peak	Spacewatch	·	2.5 km	MPC · JPL
469825	2005 SG_{209}	—	September 30, 2005	Palomar	NEAT	·	1.3 km	MPC · JPL
469826	2005 SG_{211}	—	September 30, 2005	Palomar	NEAT	MAS	750 m	MPC · JPL
469827	2005 SU_{219}	—	August 31, 2005	Kitt Peak	Spacewatch	TIR	2.7 km	MPC · JPL
469828	2005 SB_{228}	—	September 30, 2005	Kitt Peak	Spacewatch	THM	2.4 km	MPC · JPL
469829	2005 SN_{232}	—	September 30, 2005	Mount Lemmon	Mount Lemmon Survey	·	980 m	MPC · JPL
469830	2005 SM_{235}	—	September 29, 2005	Mount Lemmon	Mount Lemmon Survey	NYS	1.1 km	MPC · JPL
469831	2005 SH_{237}	—	September 29, 2005	Kitt Peak	Spacewatch	EOS	4.7 km	MPC · JPL
469832	2005 SD_{239}	—	September 30, 2005	Kitt Peak	Spacewatch	·	820 m	MPC · JPL
469833	2005 SN_{241}	—	September 30, 2005	Kitt Peak	Spacewatch	·	3.1 km	MPC · JPL
469834	2005 SL_{243}	—	September 27, 2005	Socorro	LINEAR	·	1.1 km	MPC · JPL
469835	2005 ST_{249}	—	September 23, 2005	Catalina	CSS	·	1.0 km	MPC · JPL
469836	2005 SS_{256}	—	September 22, 2005	Palomar	NEAT	MAS	750 m	MPC · JPL
469837	2005 SN_{265}	—	September 27, 2005	Kitt Peak	Spacewatch	·	930 m	MPC · JPL
469838	2005 TR_{8}	—	October 1, 2005	Kitt Peak	Spacewatch	·	3.6 km	MPC · JPL
469839	2005 TG_{15}	—	October 1, 2005	Catalina	CSS	·	3.4 km	MPC · JPL
469840	2005 TB_{39}	—	October 1, 2005	Catalina	CSS	·	1.2 km	MPC · JPL
469841	2005 TZ_{39}	—	August 9, 2000	Kitt Peak	Spacewatch	·	2.2 km	MPC · JPL
469842	2005 TC_{43}	—	October 5, 2005	Socorro	LINEAR	MAS	700 m	MPC · JPL
469843	2005 TR_{43}	—	October 5, 2005	Socorro	LINEAR	·	1.0 km	MPC · JPL
469844	2005 TK_{66}	—	October 5, 2005	Kitt Peak	Spacewatch	·	2.6 km	MPC · JPL
469845	2005 TF_{71}	—	October 6, 2005	Mount Lemmon	Mount Lemmon Survey	·	2.1 km	MPC · JPL
469846	2005 TB_{88}	—	September 24, 2005	Kitt Peak	Spacewatch	·	1.0 km	MPC · JPL
469847	2005 TJ_{108}	—	October 7, 2005	Kitt Peak	Spacewatch	·	1.0 km	MPC · JPL
469848	2005 TN_{116}	—	October 3, 2005	Kitt Peak	Spacewatch	·	1.2 km	MPC · JPL
469849	2005 TK_{124}	—	October 7, 2005	Kitt Peak	Spacewatch	·	940 m	MPC · JPL
469850	2005 TL_{126}	—	October 7, 2005	Kitt Peak	Spacewatch	·	890 m	MPC · JPL
469851	2005 TS_{126}	—	September 29, 2005	Mount Lemmon	Mount Lemmon Survey	THM	2.1 km	MPC · JPL
469852	2005 TX_{133}	—	October 10, 2005	Kitt Peak	Spacewatch	·	3.0 km	MPC · JPL
469853	2005 TE_{191}	—	October 1, 2005	Anderson Mesa	LONEOS	·	1.2 km	MPC · JPL
469854	2005 TK_{191}	—	October 1, 2005	Mount Lemmon	Mount Lemmon Survey	·	920 m	MPC · JPL
469855	2005 UU_{9}	—	October 21, 2005	Palomar	NEAT	ERI	1.8 km	MPC · JPL
469856	2005 UN_{15}	—	October 22, 2005	Kitt Peak	Spacewatch	MAS	650 m	MPC · JPL
469857	2005 UE_{16}	—	October 22, 2005	Kitt Peak	Spacewatch	·	5.2 km	MPC · JPL
469858	2005 UH_{17}	—	October 22, 2005	Kitt Peak	Spacewatch	·	3.4 km	MPC · JPL
469859	2005 UD_{18}	—	September 26, 2005	Kitt Peak	Spacewatch	·	1.2 km	MPC · JPL
469860	2005 UE_{21}	—	October 10, 2005	Kitt Peak	Spacewatch	EOS	2.0 km	MPC · JPL
469861	2005 UW_{23}	—	October 23, 2005	Kitt Peak	Spacewatch	·	1.0 km	MPC · JPL
469862	2005 UB_{24}	—	October 23, 2005	Kitt Peak	Spacewatch	NYS	1.0 km	MPC · JPL
469863	2005 UH_{25}	—	October 5, 2005	Kitt Peak	Spacewatch	·	3.0 km	MPC · JPL
469864	2005 UH_{41}	—	October 25, 2005	Mount Lemmon	Mount Lemmon Survey	·	2.1 km	MPC · JPL
469865	2005 UM_{43}	—	October 22, 2005	Kitt Peak	Spacewatch	·	1.1 km	MPC · JPL
469866	2005 UF_{44}	—	October 22, 2005	Kitt Peak	Spacewatch	·	4.6 km	MPC · JPL
469867	2005 UC_{45}	—	October 22, 2005	Kitt Peak	Spacewatch	·	980 m	MPC · JPL
469868	2005 UB_{49}	—	October 23, 2005	Catalina	CSS	·	3.6 km	MPC · JPL
469869	2005 UQ_{52}	—	September 25, 2005	Kitt Peak	Spacewatch	NYS	1.3 km	MPC · JPL
469870	2005 UO_{61}	—	October 25, 2005	Mount Lemmon	Mount Lemmon Survey	·	1.1 km	MPC · JPL
469871	2005 UU_{75}	—	October 24, 2005	Palomar	NEAT	·	4.3 km	MPC · JPL
469872	2005 UA_{78}	—	October 25, 2005	Mount Lemmon	Mount Lemmon Survey	·	2.4 km	MPC · JPL
469873	2005 UL_{94}	—	October 22, 2005	Kitt Peak	Spacewatch	·	2.6 km	MPC · JPL
469874	2005 UF_{100}	—	October 22, 2005	Kitt Peak	Spacewatch	·	2.5 km	MPC · JPL
469875	2005 UU_{148}	—	October 26, 2005	Kitt Peak	Spacewatch	·	1.0 km	MPC · JPL
469876	2005 UX_{177}	—	October 24, 2005	Kitt Peak	Spacewatch	·	3.5 km	MPC · JPL
469877	2005 UQ_{182}	—	October 24, 2005	Kitt Peak	Spacewatch	EOS	2.0 km	MPC · JPL
469878	2005 UQ_{206}	—	October 27, 2005	Kitt Peak	Spacewatch	·	1.0 km	MPC · JPL
469879	2005 UQ_{207}	—	October 27, 2005	Kitt Peak	Spacewatch	·	1.0 km	MPC · JPL
469880	2005 UN_{226}	—	October 25, 2005	Kitt Peak	Spacewatch	NYS	1.2 km	MPC · JPL
469881	2005 UJ_{250}	—	October 23, 2005	Palomar	NEAT	·	1.0 km	MPC · JPL
469882	2005 UW_{287}	—	October 26, 2005	Kitt Peak	Spacewatch	·	2.7 km	MPC · JPL
469883	2005 UJ_{323}	—	October 28, 2005	Catalina	CSS	·	1.1 km	MPC · JPL
469884	2005 UP_{455}	—	September 29, 2005	Catalina	CSS	TIR	2.8 km	MPC · JPL
469885	2005 UC_{476}	—	September 13, 2005	Socorro	LINEAR	TIR	3.4 km	MPC · JPL
469886	2005 UD_{488}	—	October 23, 2005	Catalina	CSS	·	1.4 km	MPC · JPL
469887	2005 UV_{489}	—	October 23, 2005	Catalina	CSS	·	1.5 km	MPC · JPL
469888	2005 UE_{507}	—	October 20, 2005	Palomar	NEAT	MAS	770 m	MPC · JPL
469889	2005 UF_{518}	—	October 25, 2005	Apache Point	A. C. Becker	·	3.0 km	MPC · JPL
469890	2005 UO_{522}	—	October 27, 2005	Apache Point	A. C. Becker	NYS	1.1 km	MPC · JPL
469891	2005 VG_{118}	—	November 11, 2005	Socorro	LINEAR	·	4.2 km	MPC · JPL
469892	2005 VH_{118}	—	November 11, 2005	Socorro	LINEAR	T_{j} (2.98)	3.5 km	MPC · JPL
469893	2005 VS_{119}	—	November 3, 2005	Mount Lemmon	Mount Lemmon Survey	526	2.3 km	MPC · JPL
469894	2005 VM_{124}	—	November 10, 2005	Mount Lemmon	Mount Lemmon Survey	·	2.6 km	MPC · JPL
469895	2005 VF_{128}	—	November 1, 2005	Apache Point	A. C. Becker	·	1.1 km	MPC · JPL
469896	2005 WC_{1}	—	November 21, 2005	Socorro	LINEAR	APO · PHA	260 m	MPC · JPL
469897	2005 WF_{40}	—	November 25, 2005	Mount Lemmon	Mount Lemmon Survey	·	1.7 km	MPC · JPL
469898	2005 WB_{41}	—	November 21, 2005	Kitt Peak	Spacewatch	PHO	2.7 km	MPC · JPL
469899	2005 WY_{54}	—	November 25, 2005	Mount Lemmon	Mount Lemmon Survey	·	1.2 km	MPC · JPL
469900	2005 WE_{79}	—	November 25, 2005	Kitt Peak	Spacewatch	EUN	1.5 km	MPC · JPL

== 469901–470000 ==
back to top

Designation			Discovery			Properties		Ref
Permanent	Provisional	Named after	Date	Site	Discoverer(s)	Category	Diam.	Ref
469901	2005 WA_{89}	—	October 23, 2005	Catalina	CSS	·	1.2 km	MPC · JPL
469902	2005 WF_{99}	—	November 28, 2005	Mount Lemmon	Mount Lemmon Survey	·	1.1 km	MPC · JPL
469903	2005 WL_{163}	—	September 25, 2005	Kitt Peak	Spacewatch	·	3.0 km	MPC · JPL
469904	2005 WZ_{163}	—	November 29, 2005	Kitt Peak	Spacewatch	·	1.2 km	MPC · JPL
469905	2005 WF_{176}	—	November 30, 2005	Kitt Peak	Spacewatch	EOS	1.8 km	MPC · JPL
469906	2005 WL_{191}	—	November 22, 2005	Catalina	CSS	·	1.4 km	MPC · JPL
469907	2005 XO_{11}	—	December 1, 2005	Kitt Peak	Spacewatch	·	1.3 km	MPC · JPL
469908	2005 XV_{22}	—	November 10, 2005	Mount Lemmon	Mount Lemmon Survey	·	1.1 km	MPC · JPL
469909	2005 YR_{42}	—	December 24, 2005	Kitt Peak	Spacewatch	EUN	1.1 km	MPC · JPL
469910	2005 YW_{49}	—	December 24, 2005	Kitt Peak	Spacewatch	·	890 m	MPC · JPL
469911	2005 YR_{51}	—	December 26, 2005	Mount Lemmon	Mount Lemmon Survey	·	1.2 km	MPC · JPL
469912	2005 YN_{77}	—	December 24, 2005	Kitt Peak	Spacewatch	·	2.5 km	MPC · JPL
469913	2005 YR_{86}	—	December 25, 2005	Kitt Peak	Spacewatch	·	1.4 km	MPC · JPL
469914	2005 YE_{87}	—	December 25, 2005	Mount Lemmon	Mount Lemmon Survey	·	1.6 km	MPC · JPL
469915	2005 YA_{89}	—	December 26, 2005	Kitt Peak	Spacewatch	·	1.1 km	MPC · JPL
469916	2005 YL_{91}	—	November 30, 2005	Mount Lemmon	Mount Lemmon Survey	(5)	1.3 km	MPC · JPL
469917	2005 YJ_{132}	—	December 25, 2005	Mount Lemmon	Mount Lemmon Survey	·	1.4 km	MPC · JPL
469918	2005 YV_{155}	—	December 4, 2005	Mount Lemmon	Mount Lemmon Survey	·	1.5 km	MPC · JPL
469919	2005 YS_{161}	—	December 27, 2005	Kitt Peak	Spacewatch	·	1.1 km	MPC · JPL
469920	2005 YC_{165}	—	October 29, 2005	Mount Lemmon	Mount Lemmon Survey	526	2.4 km	MPC · JPL
469921	2005 YZ_{169}	—	December 31, 2005	Kitt Peak	Spacewatch	KRM	2.4 km	MPC · JPL
469922	2005 YN_{177}	—	December 25, 2005	Kitt Peak	Spacewatch	·	1.4 km	MPC · JPL
469923	2005 YZ_{191}	—	December 30, 2005	Kitt Peak	Spacewatch	·	1.2 km	MPC · JPL
469924	2005 YV_{207}	—	December 30, 2005	Kitt Peak	Spacewatch	·	1.4 km	MPC · JPL
469925	2005 YO_{209}	—	December 24, 2005	Catalina	CSS	H	700 m	MPC · JPL
469926	2005 YR_{228}	—	December 25, 2005	Kitt Peak	Spacewatch	·	1.5 km	MPC · JPL
469927	2005 YU_{269}	—	December 26, 2005	Mount Lemmon	Mount Lemmon Survey	·	1.6 km	MPC · JPL
469928	2005 YS_{271}	—	December 28, 2005	Mount Lemmon	Mount Lemmon Survey	·	1.8 km	MPC · JPL
469929	2006 AK_{8}	—	January 8, 2006	Mount Lemmon	Mount Lemmon Survey	AMO · APO	210 m	MPC · JPL
469930	2006 AO_{11}	—	January 2, 2006	Mount Lemmon	Mount Lemmon Survey	·	890 m	MPC · JPL
469931	2006 AH_{43}	—	January 6, 2006	Kitt Peak	Spacewatch	EUN	1.2 km	MPC · JPL
469932	2006 AL_{46}	—	January 5, 2006	Kitt Peak	Spacewatch	·	1.0 km	MPC · JPL
469933	2006 AV_{48}	—	December 1, 2005	Kitt Peak	Spacewatch	·	1.0 km	MPC · JPL
469934	2006 AZ_{59}	—	January 5, 2006	Kitt Peak	Spacewatch	CYB	4.2 km	MPC · JPL
469935	2006 AO_{61}	—	December 28, 2005	Kitt Peak	Spacewatch	·	940 m	MPC · JPL
469936	2006 AN_{75}	—	January 4, 2006	Kitt Peak	Spacewatch	·	890 m	MPC · JPL
469937	2006 BF_{16}	—	January 8, 2006	Kitt Peak	Spacewatch	MAR	730 m	MPC · JPL
469938	2006 BK_{27}	—	January 21, 2006	Kitt Peak	Spacewatch	·	1.9 km	MPC · JPL
469939	2006 BX_{40}	—	January 21, 2006	Mount Lemmon	Mount Lemmon Survey	·	990 m	MPC · JPL
469940	2006 BF_{61}	—	January 2, 2006	Catalina	CSS	EUN	1.2 km	MPC · JPL
469941	2006 BN_{62}	—	January 23, 2006	Socorro	LINEAR	·	2.4 km	MPC · JPL
469942	2006 BB_{68}	—	January 10, 2006	Mount Lemmon	Mount Lemmon Survey	·	1.7 km	MPC · JPL
469943	2006 BS_{73}	—	January 23, 2006	Kitt Peak	Spacewatch	·	2.1 km	MPC · JPL
469944	2006 BX_{88}	—	January 25, 2006	Kitt Peak	Spacewatch	EUN	1.4 km	MPC · JPL
469945	2006 BY_{92}	—	January 26, 2006	Kitt Peak	Spacewatch	RAF	1.1 km	MPC · JPL
469946	2006 BG_{103}	—	January 23, 2006	Mount Lemmon	Mount Lemmon Survey	·	1.1 km	MPC · JPL
469947	2006 BR_{110}	—	January 25, 2006	Kitt Peak	Spacewatch	·	910 m	MPC · JPL
469948	2006 BT_{111}	—	January 25, 2006	Kitt Peak	Spacewatch	·	920 m	MPC · JPL
469949	2006 BR_{112}	—	January 25, 2006	Kitt Peak	Spacewatch	·	1.4 km	MPC · JPL
469950	2006 BF_{142}	—	January 26, 2006	Mount Lemmon	Mount Lemmon Survey	·	890 m	MPC · JPL
469951	2006 BY_{144}	—	January 23, 2006	Socorro	LINEAR	·	2.4 km	MPC · JPL
469952	2006 BN_{155}	—	January 25, 2006	Kitt Peak	Spacewatch	·	2.2 km	MPC · JPL
469953	2006 BB_{171}	—	January 9, 2006	Kitt Peak	Spacewatch	MAR	800 m	MPC · JPL
469954	2006 BY_{175}	—	January 27, 2006	Kitt Peak	Spacewatch	·	1.8 km	MPC · JPL
469955	2006 BH_{200}	—	January 7, 2006	Kitt Peak	Spacewatch	·	1.3 km	MPC · JPL
469956	2006 BB_{211}	—	January 31, 2006	Kitt Peak	Spacewatch	·	1.2 km	MPC · JPL
469957	2006 BF_{221}	—	January 25, 2006	Kitt Peak	Spacewatch	JUN	1.0 km	MPC · JPL
469958	2006 CC_{9}	—	February 1, 2006	Catalina	CSS	MAR	1.3 km	MPC · JPL
469959	2006 CF_{64}	—	November 25, 2005	Kitt Peak	Spacewatch	·	1.2 km	MPC · JPL
469960	2006 DG_{5}	—	February 20, 2006	Catalina	CSS	·	2.0 km	MPC · JPL
469961	2006 DD_{29}	—	February 20, 2006	Kitt Peak	Spacewatch	·	2.4 km	MPC · JPL
469962	2006 DF_{43}	—	February 20, 2006	Kitt Peak	Spacewatch	·	1.2 km	MPC · JPL
469963	2006 DZ_{56}	—	February 24, 2006	Catalina	CSS	JUN	1.3 km	MPC · JPL
469964	2006 DX_{79}	—	February 7, 2006	Mount Lemmon	Mount Lemmon Survey	·	1.8 km	MPC · JPL
469965	2006 DR_{88}	—	February 24, 2006	Kitt Peak	Spacewatch	EUN	1.3 km	MPC · JPL
469966	2006 DF_{93}	—	February 24, 2006	Kitt Peak	Spacewatch	·	1.5 km	MPC · JPL
469967	2006 DJ_{93}	—	February 24, 2006	Kitt Peak	Spacewatch	·	1.7 km	MPC · JPL
469968	2006 DK_{99}	—	February 2, 2006	Mount Lemmon	Mount Lemmon Survey	·	2.6 km	MPC · JPL
469969	2006 DO_{120}	—	February 21, 2006	Catalina	CSS	JUN	1.1 km	MPC · JPL
469970	2006 DK_{151}	—	February 25, 2006	Mount Lemmon	Mount Lemmon Survey	EUN	1.4 km	MPC · JPL
469971	2006 DM_{156}	—	February 27, 2006	Kitt Peak	Spacewatch	·	1.4 km	MPC · JPL
469972	2006 DZ_{194}	—	February 28, 2006	Mount Lemmon	Mount Lemmon Survey	·	1.1 km	MPC · JPL
469973	2006 DK_{195}	—	January 26, 2006	Kitt Peak	Spacewatch	·	1.9 km	MPC · JPL
469974	2006 DZ_{208}	—	February 27, 2006	Kitt Peak	Spacewatch	EUN	1.2 km	MPC · JPL
469975	2006 DD_{216}	—	February 20, 2006	Kitt Peak	Spacewatch	·	1.4 km	MPC · JPL
469976	2006 EE_{9}	—	March 2, 2006	Kitt Peak	Spacewatch	·	1.4 km	MPC · JPL
469977	2006 EF_{55}	—	March 5, 2006	Kitt Peak	Spacewatch	·	1.3 km	MPC · JPL
469978	2006 FC	—	March 18, 2006	Bergisch Gladbach	W. Bickel	·	1.5 km	MPC · JPL
469979	2006 FF_{49}	—	February 25, 2006	Anderson Mesa	LONEOS	·	2.1 km	MPC · JPL
469980	2006 GT_{1}	—	April 2, 2006	Kitt Peak	Spacewatch	·	620 m	MPC · JPL
469981	2006 HO_{8}	—	March 24, 2006	Mount Lemmon	Mount Lemmon Survey	·	1.7 km	MPC · JPL
469982	2006 HE_{22}	—	April 20, 2006	Kitt Peak	Spacewatch	·	1.5 km	MPC · JPL
469983	2006 HR_{40}	—	April 21, 2006	Catalina	CSS	·	1.9 km	MPC · JPL
469984	2006 HM_{41}	—	April 21, 2006	Kitt Peak	Spacewatch	·	2.3 km	MPC · JPL
469985	2006 HV_{100}	—	April 30, 2006	Kitt Peak	Spacewatch	·	1.9 km	MPC · JPL
469986	2006 HV_{103}	—	April 30, 2006	Kitt Peak	Spacewatch	·	2.1 km	MPC · JPL
469987	2006 HJ_{123}	—	April 27, 2006	Cerro Tololo	M. W. Buie	plutino	216 km	MPC · JPL
469988	2006 HN_{140}	—	April 26, 2006	Cerro Tololo	M. W. Buie	·	1.6 km	MPC · JPL
469989	2006 JT_{14}	—	May 1, 2006	Kitt Peak	Spacewatch	·	1.8 km	MPC · JPL
469990	2006 JW_{17}	—	April 24, 2006	Kitt Peak	Spacewatch	AGN	1.3 km	MPC · JPL
469991	2006 JQ_{29}	—	April 8, 2006	Kitt Peak	Spacewatch	·	1.8 km	MPC · JPL
469992	2006 JP_{34}	—	May 4, 2006	Kitt Peak	Spacewatch	·	1.4 km	MPC · JPL
469993	2006 KE_{13}	—	May 20, 2006	Kitt Peak	Spacewatch	EUN	1.2 km	MPC · JPL
469994	2006 KU_{13}	—	May 1, 2006	Catalina	CSS	·	1.8 km	MPC · JPL
469995	2006 KK_{15}	—	March 2, 2006	Kitt Peak	Spacewatch	·	2.3 km	MPC · JPL
469996	2006 KF_{26}	—	May 20, 2006	Kitt Peak	Spacewatch	·	1.8 km	MPC · JPL
469997	2006 KH_{48}	—	May 21, 2006	Kitt Peak	Spacewatch	·	2.1 km	MPC · JPL
469998	2006 KM_{57}	—	May 9, 2006	Mount Lemmon	Mount Lemmon Survey	·	540 m	MPC · JPL
469999	2006 KJ_{62}	—	May 22, 2006	Kitt Peak	Spacewatch	·	610 m	MPC · JPL
470000	2006 KC_{102}	—	May 23, 2006	Kitt Peak	Spacewatch	·	510 m	MPC · JPL

back to top

== Meaning of names ==
As minor planet discoveries are confirmed, they are given a permanent number by the IAU's Minor Planet Center (MPC), and the discoverers can then submit names for them, following the IAU's naming conventions. The list below concerns those minor planets in the specified number-range that have received names, and explains the meanings of those names.

Official naming citations of newly named small Solar System bodies are approved and published in a bulletin by IAU's Working Group for Small Bodies Nomenclature (WGSBN). Before May 2021, citations were published in MPC's Minor Planet Circulars for many decades. Recent citations can also be found on the JPL Small-Body Database (SBDB). Until his death in 2016, German astronomer Lutz D. Schmadel compiled these citations into the Dictionary of Minor Planet Names (DMP) and regularly updated the collection.

Based on Paul Herget's The Names of the Minor Planets, Schmadel also researched the unclear origin of numerous asteroids, most of which had been named prior to World War II. This article incorporates text from this source, which is in the public domain: SBDB New namings may only be added to this list below after official publication as the preannouncement of names is condemned. The WGSBN publishes a comprehensive guideline for the naming rules of non-cometary small Solar System bodies.

Named minor planet	Provisional	This minor planet was named for...	Ref · Catalog
469219 Kamoʻoalewa	2016 HO_{3}	Kamoʻoalewa alludes to a celestial object that is oscillating, like its path in the sky as viewed from the Earth.	JPL · 469219
469366 Watkins	2001 PH_{13}	Michael Watkins (born 1963) was Manager of JPL's Science Division from 2013 to 2015. In 2016, he became the ninth director of JPL.	JPL · 469366
469705 ǂKá̦gára	2005 EF_{298}	In the mythology of the ǀXam people of the Karoo region of southern Africa, ǂKá̦gára and ǃHãunu fought an epic battle in the east using thunder and lightning, producing mountainous clouds and rain. The conflict was over ǂKá̦gára returning his younger sister, ǃHãunu's wife, to their parents. [The primary is being named ǂKá̦gára and the satellite is being named ǃHãunu.]	IAU · 469705
469748 Volnay	2005 PO_{5}	The French village of Volnay is situated directly south of Beaune, in the Burgundy vineyard region.	JPL · 469748
469773 Kitaibel	2005 QB_{76}	Pál Kitaibel (1757–1817) was a Hungarian botanist and chemist. He spent several years investigating flora and fauna in the Carpathian Basin and surrounding mountains. In 1789 he independently discovered the element tellurium. The genus Kitaibelia of mallows was named after him.	IAU · 469773
