= San religion =

Religion and mythology

San or Bushman religion is any of the traditional religions of the various San or Bushman peoples of Southern Africa. They are poorly attested due to their interactions with Christianity.

== Gods and mythical figures ==
ǀXam religion

The ǀXam prayed to the Sun and Moon. Many myths are ascribed to various stars.

- ǀKágge̥n (sometimes corrupted to "Cagn") is a Mantis, demiurge, and hero in ǀXam folklore. He is a trickster god who can shape-shift. His wife is ǀHúnntuǃattǃatte̥n.
- ǀHúnntuǃattǃatte̥n (also known as, or corrupted to, "Coti"), the Dassie, adopted ǃXo, the Porcupine, as their daughter.
- ǃXo, the Porcupine, the daughter of ǀKágge̥n and ǀHúnntuǃattǃatte̥n, married ǀKwammang-a, and her son was Icheumon, the Egyptian mongoose.
- ǀKwammang-a, a dangerous stranger carnivore, married ǃXo, and his son was Icheumon, the Egyptian mongoose.
- Ichneumon, the Egyptian mongoose, son of !Xo and ǀKwammang-a.
- ǂKá̦gára and ǃHãunu are brothers-in-law who fought with lightning, causing massive storms in the east.

Other religions

- ǃXu, from the Khoikhoi word ǃKhub 'rich man, master', was used by some Christian missionaries to translate "Lord" in the Bible, and repeated by various San peoples in reporting what the Khoikhoi had told them. It is used in Juǀʼhoan as the word for the Christian god. It has been misinterpreted as the "Bushman creator".
- ǃXwe-ǀna-ssho-ǃke was a girl who was one of the people of the early race

== Trance ==
To enter the spirit world, trance has to be initiated by a shaman through the hunting of a tutelary spirit or power animal. The eland often serves as power animal. The fat of the eland is used symbolically in many rituals including initiations and rites of passage. Other animals such as giraffe, kudu and hartebeest can also serve this function.

One of the most important rituals in San religions is the great dance, or the trance dance. This dance typically takes a circular form, with women clapping and singing and men dancing rhythmically. Although there is no evidence that the Kalahari San use hallucinogens regularly, student shaman may use hallucinogens to go into trance for the first time.

Psychologists have investigated hallucinations and altered states of consciousness in neuropsychology. They found that entoptic phenomena can occur through rhythmic dancing, music, sensory deprivation, hyperventilation, prolonged and intense concentration and migraines. The psychological approach explains rock art through three trance phases. In the first phase of trance an altered state of consciousness would come about. People would experience geometric shapes commonly known as entoptic phenomena. These would include zigzags, chevrons, dots, flecks, grids, vortices and U-shapes. These shapes can be found especially in rock engravings of Southern Africa.

During the second phase of trance people try to make sense of the entoptic phenomena. They would elaborate the shape they had 'seen' until they had created something that looked familiar to them. Shamans experiencing the second phase of trance would incorporate the natural world into their entoptic phenomena, visualizing honeycombs or other familiar shapes.

In the third phase a radical transformation occurs in mental imagery. The most noticeable change is that the shaman becomes part of the experience. Subjects under laboratory conditions have found that they experience sliding down a rotating tunnel, entering caves or holes in the ground. People in the third phase begin to lose their grip on reality and hallucinate monsters and animals of strong emotional content. In this phase, therianthropes in rock painting can be explained as heightened sensory awareness that gives one the feeling that they have undergone a physical transformation.

A San trance dance featuring the San of Ghanzi, Botswana appeared in BBC Television's Around the World in 80 Faiths on 16 January 2009.

== Rock art ==
Pictographs can be found across Southern Africa in places such as the cave sandstone of KwaZulu-Natal, Free State and North-Eastern Cape, the granite and Waterberg sandstone of the Northern Transvaal, the Table Mountain sandstone of the Southern and Western Cape. Images of conflict and war-making are not uncommon. There are also often images of therianthrophic entities which have both human and animal traits and are connected to the notion of trancing, but these represent only a fraction of all rock art representations. Most commonly portrayed are animals such as the eland, although grey rhebok and hartebeest are also in rock art in places such as Cederberg and Warm Bokkeveld. At uKhahlamba / Drakensberg Park there are paintings thought to be some 3,000 years old which depict humans and animals, and are thought to have religious significance. Tweeling Mafahlaneng in Mafube Local Municipality there is a rock shelter with some rock art paintings. The place has never been documented.

== See also ==
- 229762 Gǃkúnǁʼhòmdímà and 469705 ǂKá̦gára, trans-Neptunian objects named after San mythological figures

== Sources ==
- Asante, Molefi K.; Abarry, Abu Shardow (1996). African Intellectual Heritage: A Book of Sources. Temple University Press. pp. https://archive.org/details/isbn_9781566394031/page/n6 35]–37. ISBN 1-56639-403-1.
- Barnard, Alan (1992). Hunters and Herders of Southern Africa. Cambridge University Press. ISBN 0-521-42865-3.
- Biesele, M. (1993). Women Like Meat: The Folklore and Foraging Ideology of the Kalahari Ju/'hoan. Johannesburg: Witwatersrand University Press.
- Bleek, W.H.I.; Lloyd, L.C. (1911). Specimens of Bushman Folklore. London: George Allen.
- Garlake, P.S. (1995). The Hunter's Vision. London: British Museum Press.
- Guenther, M. (1999). Tricksters & Trancers: Bushman Religion and Society. Indiana: Indiana University Press.
- Hastings, James (2003). Encyclopedia of Religion and Ethics Part 2. Kessinger Publishing. ISBN 0-7661-3670-1.
- Heinz, H-J. 1975. Elements of ǃKo Bushmen religious beliefs. Anthropos 70:17–41.
- Hewitt, R.L. (1986). Narratives of the Southern San. Quellen zur Khoisan-Forschung 2. Hamburg: Helmut Buske Verlag.
- Hollman, J., ed. (2007). Customs and Beliefs of the /Xam Bushmen. Johannesburg: Witwatersrand University Press.
- Keeney, B. (1999). Profiles of Healing: Kalahari Bushmen Healers. Philadelphia: Ringing Rocks Press.
- Lang, Andrew (2003). Myth, Ritual and Religion Part 1. Kessinger Publishing. ISBN 0-7661-5668-0.
- Lee, R.B. (1967). "Trance Cure of the ǃKung Bushmen". Natural History. 76 (9): 31–37.
- Lee, R.B. (1968). "The Sociology of ǃKung Bushman Trance Performance". In Prince, R. (ed.). Trance and Possession States. Montreal: R.M. Bucke Memorial Society.
- Lewis-Williams, David (2000). Stories that Float from Afar: Ancestral Folklore of the San of Southern Africa. New Africa Books. ISBN 0-86486-462-0.
- Lewis-Williams, David (2004). San Spirituality Roots, Expressions & Social Consequences. Double Storey. ISBN 1-919930-65-5
- Marshall, L. 1999. Nyae Nyae ǃKung. Cambridge (Massachusetts): Peabody Museum Monographs (Number 8), Harvard University.
- Mohamed, Pops (2000). Bushmen of the Kalahari (CD).
- McNamee, Gregory (1996). A Desert Bestiary. Big Earth Publishing. ISBN 1-55566-176-9.
- Meletinsky, Eleazar M.; Lanoue, Guy; Sadetsky, Alexandre (2000). The Poetics of Myth. Routledge. ISBN 0-415-92898-2.
- Moore, Elizabeth; Lewis-Williams, J. David; Pearce, D. G. (2004). San Spirituality: Roots, Expression, and Social Consequences. Rowman Altamira. ISBN 0-7591-0432-8.
- Solomon, Anne; Lewis, Anne (1998). The Essential Guide to San Rock Art. New Africa Books. ISBN 0-86486-430-2.
- Stookey, Lorena Laura (2004). Thematic guide to world mythology. Greenwood Publishing Group. ISBN 0-313-31505-1.
- Vinnicombe, Patricia (1976). People of the Eland: rock paintings of the Drakensberg Bushmen as a reflection of their life and thought. Pietermaritzburg: University of Natal Press.
