= Karen Jean Meech =

American astronomer

Minor planets discovered: 9
see § List of discovered minor planets

Karen J. Meech (born 1959) is an American planetary astronomer at the Institute for Astronomy (IfA) of the University of Hawaiʻi.

== Career ==
Karen Meech specializes in planetary astronomy, in particular the study of distant comets and their relation to the early Solar System. She is also very active in professional-amateur collaboration and science teacher education and was the founder of the Towards Planetary Systems (TOPS) high-school teacher / student outreach program that helps educate science teachers in the Pacific islands. She received her PhD in Planetary Sciences in 1987 at the Massachusetts Institute of Technology, and a BS from Rice University in Houston in 1981, and has received several awards in her career, including the Annie J. Cannon Award in Astronomy in 1988 and the American Astronomical Society's H. C. Urey Prize in 1994.

She was a co-investigator on the Deep Impact mission and current co-investigator on the NASA Discovery missions EPOXI and Stardust-NExT. For all three of these missions she has coordinated the world's Earth-based and space-based observing programs. She is the primary investigator of the University of Hawaiʻi NASA Astrobiology Institute lead team which focuses its research on "Water and Habitable Worlds". She is currently the President of the International Astronomical Union Division III (Planetary Systems Science).

== Honors ==
The outer main-belt asteroid 4367 Meech, discovered by Schelte Bus at the Siding Spring Observatory in 1981, is named in her honor.

She was named a Fellow of the American Astronomical Society in 2024, "for ground-breaking research on solar and extrasolar comets and water distribution in the solar system, organization of large international observing teams, development and management of planetary science programs for teachers, and many years of service to the astronomical community".

== List of discovered minor planets ==
(228229) 1998 MO_{17}	27 June 1998	list
(356386) 2010 OK_{49}	24 June 2004	list
(469361) 2001 HY65	26 April 2001	list^{[A]}
(551000) 2012 UQ_{169}	29 May 2003	list^{[A]}
(553412) 2011 OR_{46}	29 May 2003	list^{[A]}
(557417) 2014 UQ_{178}	30 May 2003	list^{[A]}
(562541) 2016 AL_{56}	30 May 2003	list^{[A]}
(565078) 2017 BR_{47}	31 May 2003	list^{[A]}
(566268) 2017 RH_{61}	30 May 2003	list^{[A]}
Co-discovery made with: ^{A} M. W. Buie
