= ǂKá̦gára and ǃHãunu =

Characters in ǀXam mythology

ǂKá̦gára (also spelled ǂKáʻgára;) and ǃHãunu (also spelled ǃHa͠unu) are characters in ǀXam (San) mythology associated with lightning.

== Pronunciation ==
In the ǀXam language, ǂKá̦gára and ǃHãunu are thought to have been pronounced [ǂ͡káˤɡáɾa] and [ᵑ̊ǃʰəunu], respectively. The initial letters ǂK and !H (and indeed the letter ǀX in 'ǀXam') represent some of the many click consonants that characterize ǀXam and other San languages. The diacritic under the first vowel in ǂKá̦gára indicates that it is a pharyngealized vowel, another characteristic of San languages. When pronounced in English, the click consonants in words from ǀXam and other San languages are usually ignored (much as Xhosa is pronounced /ˈkoʊzə/ (KOH-zə) rather than [ǁʰosa]), resulting in /ˈkɑːʔɡɑːrə/ (KAHʼ-gar-ə) and /ˈhaʊnuː/ (HOW-noo). ASCII approximations of the names are =Ka'gara and !Haunu.

== Mythology ==
A story recorded in the 19th century tells of ǂKá̦gára falling out with his brother-in-law ǃHãunu. ǂKá̦gára came to fetch his sister and take her home, but ǃHãunu pursued them. ǃHãunu began to throw lightning at ǂKá̦gára, but ǂKá̦gára was unhurt and threw lightning back. ǃHãunu died slowly, thundering, while ǂKá̦gára went to sleep, also thundering. The story is told to young children to explain lightning and thunder during a storm.

== See also ==
- 469705 ǂKá̦gára, an astronomical body named after ǂKá̦gára, and its large moon ǃHãunu.
- San mythology
