= List of Botswana artists =

The following list of Botswana artists (in alphabetical order by last name) includes artists of various genres, who are notable and are either born in Botswana, of Botswana descent or who produce works that are primarily about Botswana.

== M ==
- Meleko Mokgosi (born 1981), painter

== N ==
- Cgʼose Ntcoxʼo (c. 1950–2013), painter, lithographer

== Q ==
- Coex'ae Qgam (1934–2008), painter, printmaker

== See also ==
- African art
- Botswana art
