= San peoples =

Southern African indigenous hunter-gatherers

San Bushmen
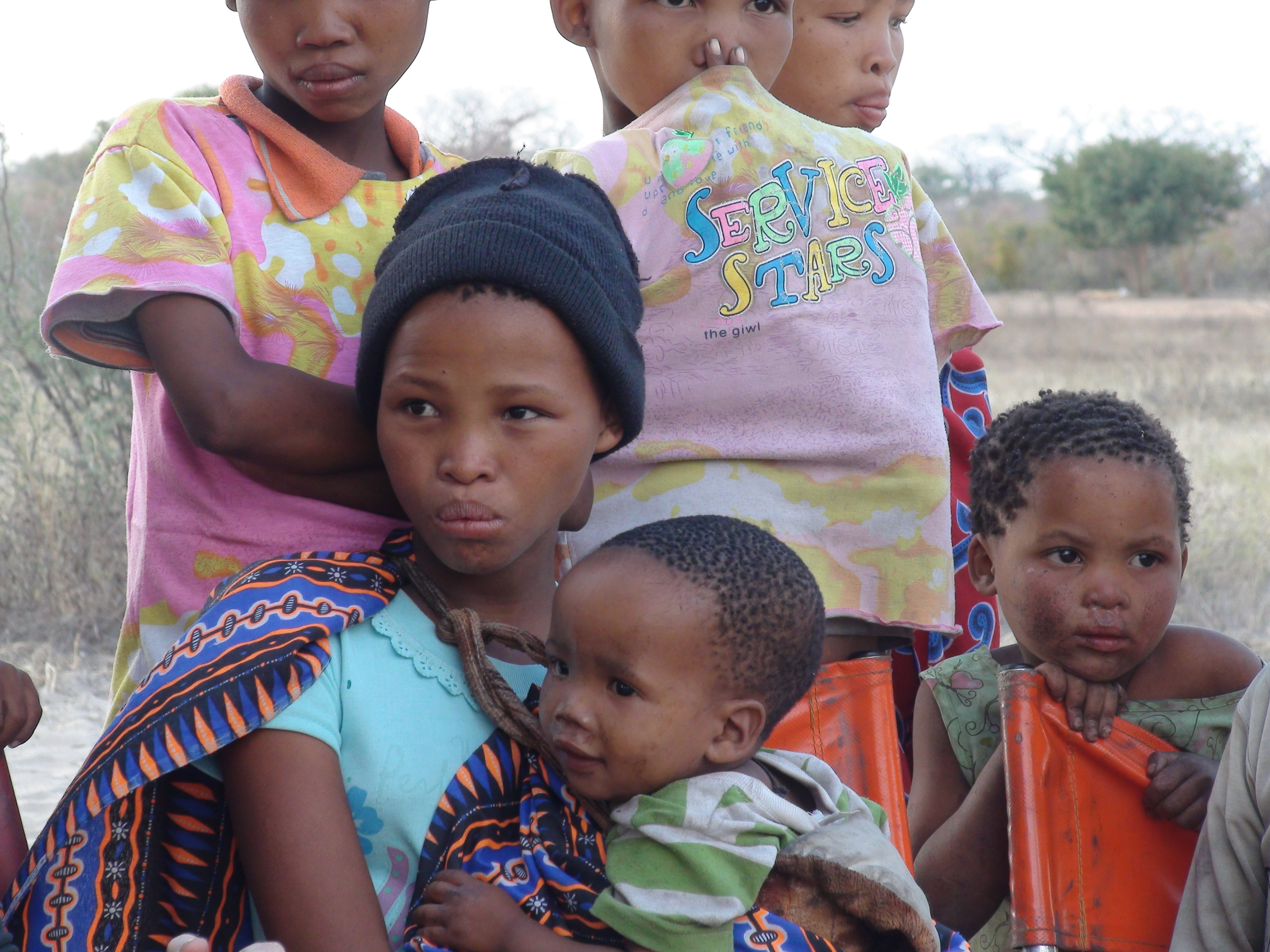
- ǃKung children in Namibia

Total population
- ca. 160,000

Regions with significant populations
- Namibia: 71,201 (2023 census)
- Botswana: 63,500
- South Africa: ca. 7,000
- Angola: ca. 16,000
- Zimbabwe: 1,200

Languages
- Native; Languages of the Khoe, Kxʼa, and Tuu families Also; Tswana • Kgalagadi • Afrikaans • English • Portuguese

Religion
- San religion, Christianity

Related ethnic groups
- Khoekhoe, Griqua, Basters, Coloureds

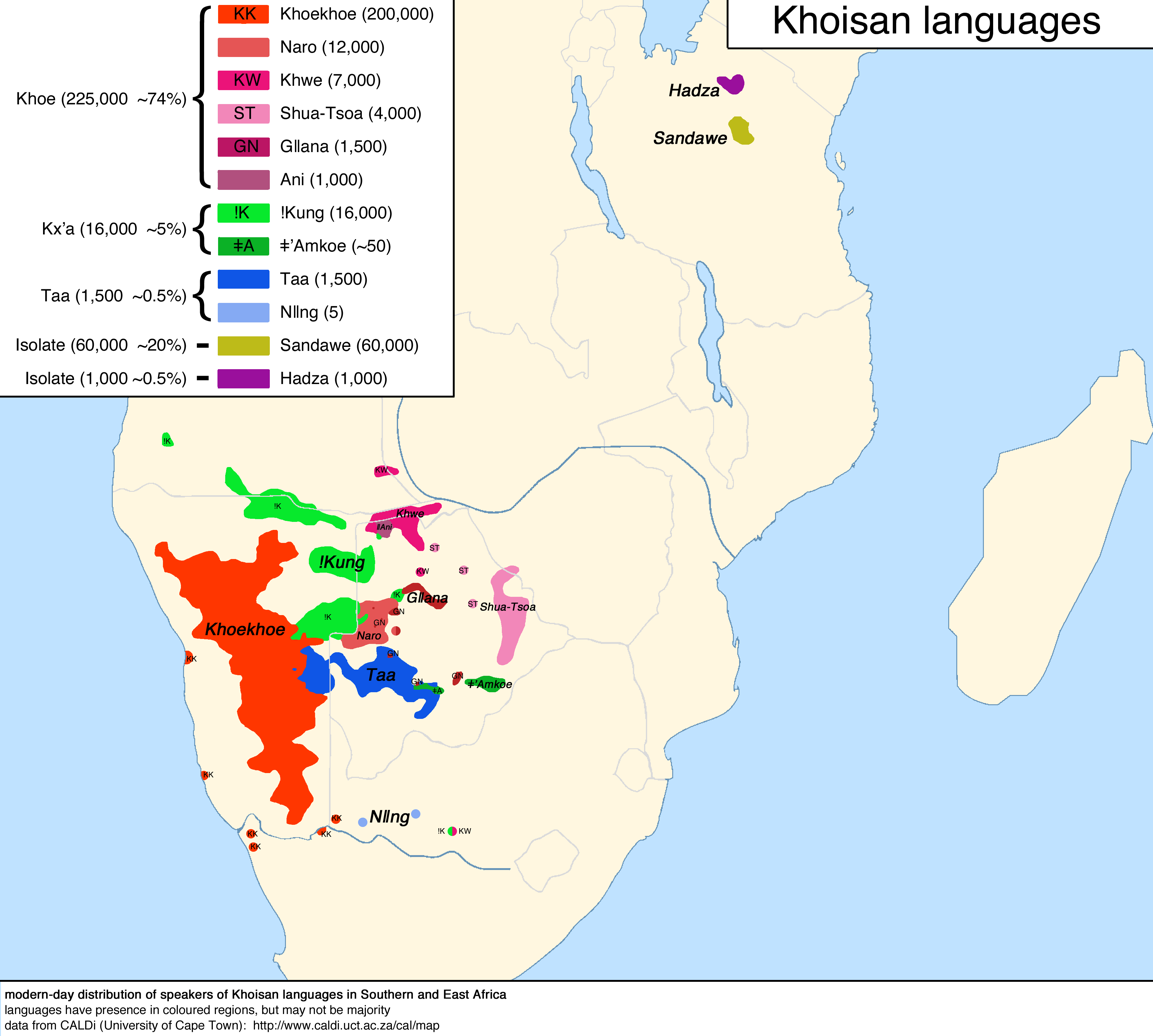
Map of modern distribution of "Khoisan" languages. The territories shaded blue and green, and those to their east, are those of San peoples.

The San peoples (also Saan), or Bushmen, are the members of any of the indigenous hunter-gatherer cultures of southern Africa, which are the oldest surviving cultures of the region. (Note: "Oldest" here means uninterrupted for the longest period of time. It should not be taken to mean that they are unchanged.) Some interpretations of the genetic analysis suggest divergence from other humans as early as 100,000 to 200,000 years ago. Their recent ancestral territories span Botswana, Namibia, Angola, Zambia, Zimbabwe, Lesotho, and South Africa.

The San speak, or their ancestors spoke, languages of the Khoe, Tuu, and Kxʼa language families, and can be defined as a people only in contrast to neighboring pastoralists such as the Khoekhoe and descendants of more recent waves of immigration such as the Bantu, Europeans, and South Asians.

In 2017, Botswana was home to approximately 63,500 San, making it the country with the highest proportion of San people at 2.8%. 71,201 San people were enumerated in Namibia in 2023, making it the country with the second highest proportion of San people at 2.4%. San is a pejorative Khoekhoe term that was adopted by Western anthropologists; the representatives of San peoples stated their preference in 2003 to be referred to as their respective nations.

== Definition ==
The San or Bushmen are the peoples of southern Africa who traditionally lived a hunter-gatherer lifestyle and spoke non-Bantu languages with click consonants (thus excluding the Twa, Kwisi and Cimba, but also the Kwadi and Damara). These include speakers of three distinct language families living between the Okavango River in Botswana and Etosha National Park in northwestern Namibia, extending up into southern Angola; central peoples of most of Namibia and Botswana, extending into Zambia and Zimbabwe; and the southern people in the central Kalahari towards the Molopo River, who together with the Khoekhoe are the last remnants of the previously extensive indigenous peoples of southern Africa.

== Names ==
The designations "Bushmen" and "San" are both exonyms. The San have no collective word for themselves in their own languages. "San" comes from a derogatory Khoekhoe word used to refer to foragers without cattle or other wealth, from a root saa "picking up from the ground" + plural -n in the Haiǁom dialect.

"Bushmen" is the older cover term, but "San" was widely adopted in the West by the late 1990s. The term Bushmen, from 17th-century Dutch Bosjesmans, is still used by others and to self-identify, but is now considered pejorative or derogatory by many South Africans. In 2008, the use of boesman (the modern Afrikaans equivalent of "Bushman") in the Die Burger newspaper was brought before the Equality Court. The San Council testified that it had no objection to its use in a positive context, and the court ruled that the use of the term was not derogatory.

The San refer to themselves as their individual nations, such as ǃKung (also spelled ǃXuun, including the Juǀʼhoansi), ǀXam, Nǁnǂe (part of the ǂKhomani), Kxoe (Khwe and ǁAni), Haiǁom, Ncoakhoe, Tshuwau, Gǁana and Gǀui (ǀGwi), etc. Representatives of San peoples in 2003 stated their preference for the use of such individual group names, where possible, over the use of the collective term San.

Adoption of the Khoekhoe term San in Western anthropology dates to the 1970s, and this remains the standard term in English-language ethnographic literature, although some authors later switched back to using the name Bushmen. The compound Khoisan is used to refer to the pastoralist Khoi and the foraging San collectively. It was coined by Leonhard Schulze in the 1920s and popularized by Isaac Schapera in 1930. Anthropological use of San was detached from the compound Khoisan, as it has been reported that the exonym San is perceived as a pejorative in parts of the central Kalahari. By the late 1990s, the term San was used generally by the people themselves. The adoption of the term was preceded by a number of meetings held in the 1990s where delegates debated on the adoption of a collective term. These meetings included the Common Access to Development Conference organized by the Government of Botswana held in Gaborone in 1993, the 1996 inaugural Annual General Meeting of the Working Group of Indigenous Minorities in Southern Africa (WIMSA) held in Namibia, and a 1997 conference in Cape Town on "Khoisan Identities and Cultural Heritage" organized by the University of the Western Cape. The term San is now standard in South African, and used officially in the blazon of the national coat-of-arms. The "South African San Council" representing San communities in South Africa was established as part of WIMSA in 2001.

The term Basarwa (singular Mosarwa) (sometimes shortened to Sarwa) is used for the San collectively in Botswana. The mo-/ba- noun class prefixes are used for people; the older variant Masarwa, with the le-/ma- prefixes used for disreputable people and animals, is offensive and was changed at independence.

In Angola, they are sometimes referred to as mucancalas, or bosquímanos (a Portuguese adaptation of the Dutch term for "Bushmen"). The terms Amasili and Batwa are sometimes used for them in Zimbabwe. The San are also referred to as Batwa by Xhosa people and as Baroa by Sotho people. The Bantu term Batwa refers to any foraging tribesmen and as such overlaps with the terminology used for the "Pygmoid" Southern Twa of South-Central Africa.

== History ==
=== Origins ===
Although there is some debate among social scientists, there is a general consensus on the claim that the modern communities described as San descend from the oldest Neolithic societies of southern and east Africa. Some 10,000 years ago, these social groups were spread from Tanzania, Zambia and Angola down to Cape Agulhas. As such, the San can be regarded as among the oldest cultures on Earth. Peoples related to or similar to the San occupied the southern shores throughout the eastern shrubland and may have formed a Sangoan continuum from the Red Sea to the Cape of Good Hope.

In the first millennium BCE, Mellet mentions two dominant groups in Southern Africa. The first one was the Tshua San, who were spread across what are now Botswana, Zimbabwe and Zambia, and strategically occupied the Shashe-Limpopo basin. The second group, further West, was the Khwe San, whose territory included present-day Botswana, Namibia, Angola and Zambia. The historical presence of the San in Botswana is particularly evident in northern Botswana's Tsodilo Hills region.

Due to their mode of sustenance based primarily on hunting and foraging, San were able to migrate and spread more rapidly than herder or farmer cultures, and are believed to have spread to present-day South Africa, including the South coast, before the Khoe and Bantu peoples. It is possible that they occasionally herded small numbers of sheep. After 650 CE, as the Khoe and Xhosa migrated into present-day Eastern Cape and after 1000 CE, into the Western Cape, the majority of the San moved from the coastal areas into the interior, with only small fishing communities remaining near the coast.

They were traditionally semi-nomadic, moving seasonally within certain defined areas based on the availability of resources such as water, game animals, and edible plants. The San organised themselves into hunting parties, and did not have clans nor chiefs, with decisions taken by elders. Early San societies left a rich legacy of cave paintings across Southern Africa, which depict hunting, battles, domestic life, and mythological events.

=== Displacement during Bantu expansion ===
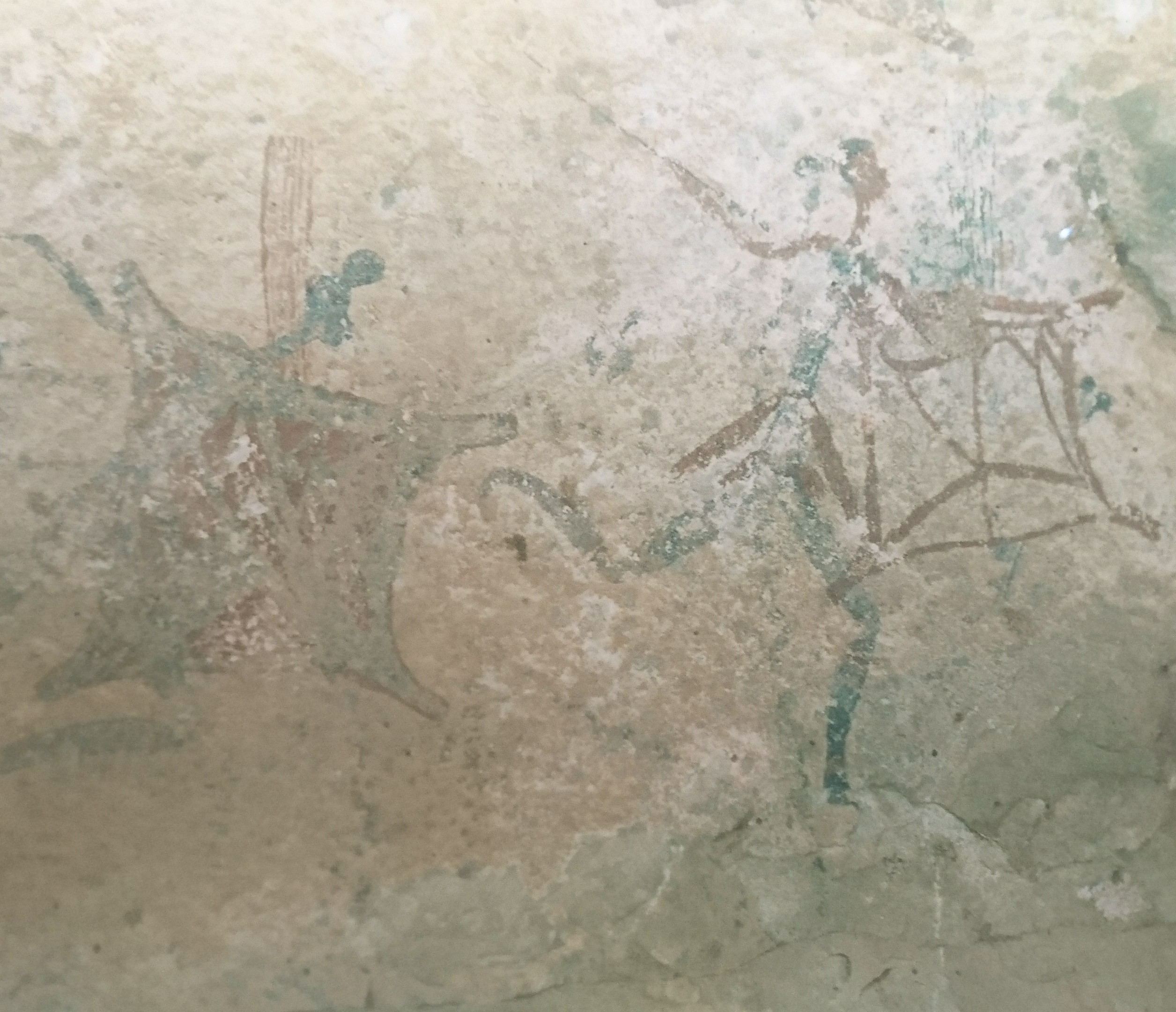
San rock art depicting a shield-carrying warrior. Previously interpreted as depicting believed to depict conflict with Nguni or Sotho warriors, recent studies indicate that such images could be religious in nature and express abstract conflict of varying nature.

Both the Tshua San and the Khwe San engaged with other communities who occupied this area on their migratory drifts southwards, including some migrant herder groups, who later evolved into the Khoekhoe, as well as herder-farmers during the Bantu expansion (2000 BCE–1000 CE). In this process, San were partly driven off their ancestral lands or incorporated by Bantu speaking groups.

The San were believed to have closer connections to the old spirits of the land, and were often turned to by other societies for rainmaking, as was the case at Mapungubwe. San shamans would enter a trance and go into the spirit world themselves to capture the animals associated with rain. Thus, Mellet claims that the San would have been involved in the early foundations of the Kingdom of Mapungubwe and subsequent birthing of the states of Thulamela, Great Zimbabwe, Mutapa Empire and others.

=== Displacement, marginalisation and genocide during European colonisation ===
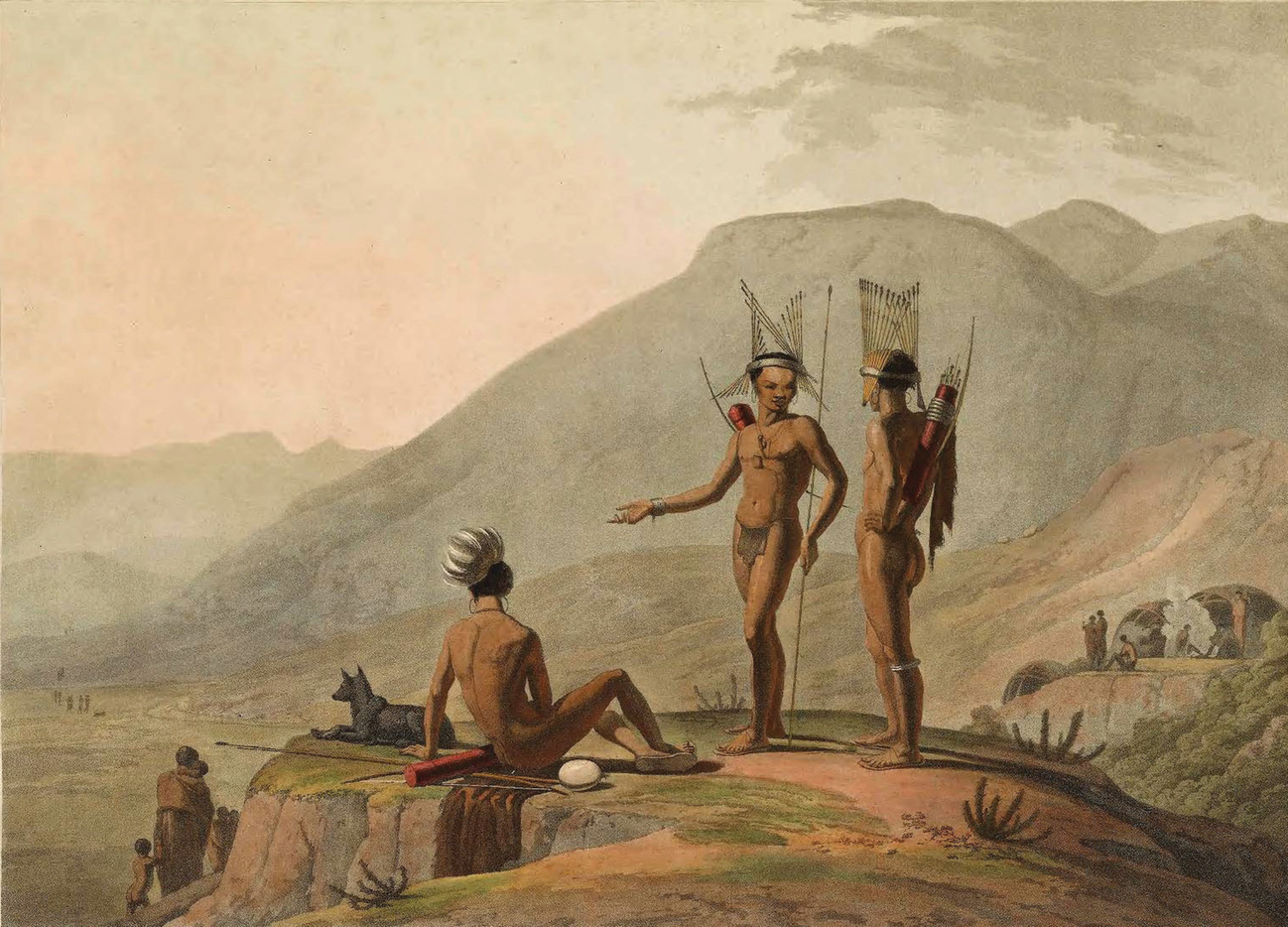
Bush-Men Hottentots armed for an Expedition, 1804

In the first few decades after the Dutch settled at the Cape of Good Hope under Jan van Riebeeck in 1652, the size of the Cape San population was estimated at 30 000 to 50 000, but European colonists had relatively few contacts with them. This changed at the start of the 18th century, when farmers started moving into the interior. From about 1714, when the Dutch East India Company (or VOC) initiated the loan farm system, which provided willing stock farmers with grazing rights on less fertile land in the dry Cape interior. This policy gave rise to a new social group, the Trekboers, or semi-nomadic pastoralists, who moved with their livestock into territories that were hitherto occupied by San bands. As the presence of these Trekboers on the dry land traditionally occupied by San intensified, the San experienced restrictions in their access to the natural resources that they lived off (land, water, game and plants). This was a result of Trekboers occupying waterholes, shooting the animals that the San subsisted on for biltong, overgrazing and damaging the ecology of the area. Over most of the 18th century, the encroachment by Trekboers deepened, prompting the San to resist by attacking the Trekboers, raiding their stock and sometimes torturing or mutilating their victims. These San raids in turn motivated Trekboers to use militia units known as commandos - first to mount punitive expeditions, then increasingly to pre-empt possible attacks. Such peaks of conflict with the San were observed in the early 1700s, 1730s, mid-1750s. From the beginning of the 1770s until the late 1790s, this violence became generalised along the frontier of the Dutch Cape Colony.

In those last three decades of the 18th century, commando activity became a regular feature of the late winter, and involved surrounding the San camp at night and attacking at dawn, killing all the men on the spot. Women and children were often killed, but could also be taken captive. In addition to routine killings of small groups, there were larger massacres in which hundreds of San could be killed in one raid., These acts of extreme brutality were often justified by the racist perception that the San hunter-gatherers were either not fully human, or belonged to an inferior category of humans doomed for extinction. In 1777, after several decades of unsuccessfully calling for restraint, the VOC officially endorsed the policy of eradication of the San.

By the end of the 18th century, when the British took control of the Cape colony, thousands of San had been killed and forced to work for the colonists. The British attempted a policy of cultural assimilation to make the San adopt an agricultural lifestyle, but this approach mostly failed. They were also not successful in stopping sporadic commando attacks against the San, although the death toll was significantly reduced compared with the end of the VOC period - official government records, which are certainly incomplete, indicate that 2,480 San were killed and 654 captured in the last decade of VOC rule, compared to 367 killed and 252 captured in the first decade of British and Batavian rule. By the 1850s, independent San existence as hunter-gatherers had become extremely precarious and gradually most San became tied to farmers, due to a combination of threats, retention of wives and children, and starvation. There is also some evidence of bartering of San children against sheep or goats, which was banned in 1817, leading to clandestine child trafficking. Along the Northern border of the Cape Colony, the San also suffered attacks and massacres from pastoralist groups such as the Griqua, Korana and 'Bastard'. In 1863, Louis Anthing estimated that there were no more than 500 San left in the whole of Bushmanland, and that they were in a desperate situation, facing starvation. The Korana wars of 1868-69 and 1878-79 1870s, in which some |xam people participated on the side of the Korana, led to the killing, starvation or captivity and bondage of the last San of the Cape.

The recognition of the violence, physical and cultural destruction of the Cape San as a genocide has not been unanimous. Historians writing before the coining of the word genocide referred to a war of extermination, extinction, extirpation. More recent authors have used the word genocide., with N. Penn preferring to refer to a 'partial genocide' or 'fighting that approached the genocidal' because the systematic killing did not apply to all San. Anthropologist Miklós Szalay has been the most prominent academic voice objecting to applying the label of genocide to the destruction of Cape San society, arguing that commandos were primarily designed to procure labour force for the Boer farmers and that the VOC policy of 1777 was a slogan that wasn't put into practice. However, Adhikari shows that Szalay's arguments are disproved by evidence, especially the high ratio of San killed to those made captive in the 1770-1795 period, and the fact that even enslavement of women and children contributed to the collapse of San society.

Regarding the experience of San people in other African countries, there is evidence that they also faced continued threats of displacement, marginalisation and violence in the context of European encroachment, yet some groups were able to survive. In German South West Africa, specifically in the area stretching from Otavi to Gobabis, the worst genocidal violence against San groups happened between 1912 and 1915. Following an order by the German Governor endorsing shootings of San people, over 400 anti-Bushmen patrols were deployed between 1911 and 1913, and the San population in the area dropped from 8-12,000 in 1913 to 3,600 in 1923. After the territory was taken over by South Africa in 1915, there is evidence that South African government also issued licenses for people to hunt the San in South West Africa (present-day Namibia), with the last one being reportedly issued in 1936.

In the colony of Bechuanaland, the Ghanzi district, which was regarded as a stronghold of San communities, was divided among white cattle farmers in the second half of the 19th century, forcing San individuals to become what was called "farm Bushmen", working as cattle herders. Throughout the colonial period, they experienced further displacement and marginalisation.

=== San communities in decolonised African states ===
From the 1950s through to the 1990s, San communities switched to farming because of government-mandated modernization programs. Despite the lifestyle changes, they have provided a wealth of information in anthropology and genetics. One broad study of African genetic diversity, completed in 2009, found that the genetic diversity of the San was among the top five of all 121 sampled populations. Certain San groups are one of 14 known extant "ancestral population clusters"; that is, "groups of populations with common genetic ancestry, who share ethnicity and similarities in both their culture and the properties of their languages".

Despite some positive aspects of government development programs reported by members of San and Bakgalagadi communities in Botswana, many have spoken of a consistent sense of exclusion from government decision-making processes, and many San and Bakgalagadi have alleged experiencing ethnic discrimination on the part of the government. The United States Department of State described ongoing discrimination against San, or Basarwa, people in Botswana in 2013 as the "principal human rights concern" of that country.

== Society ==
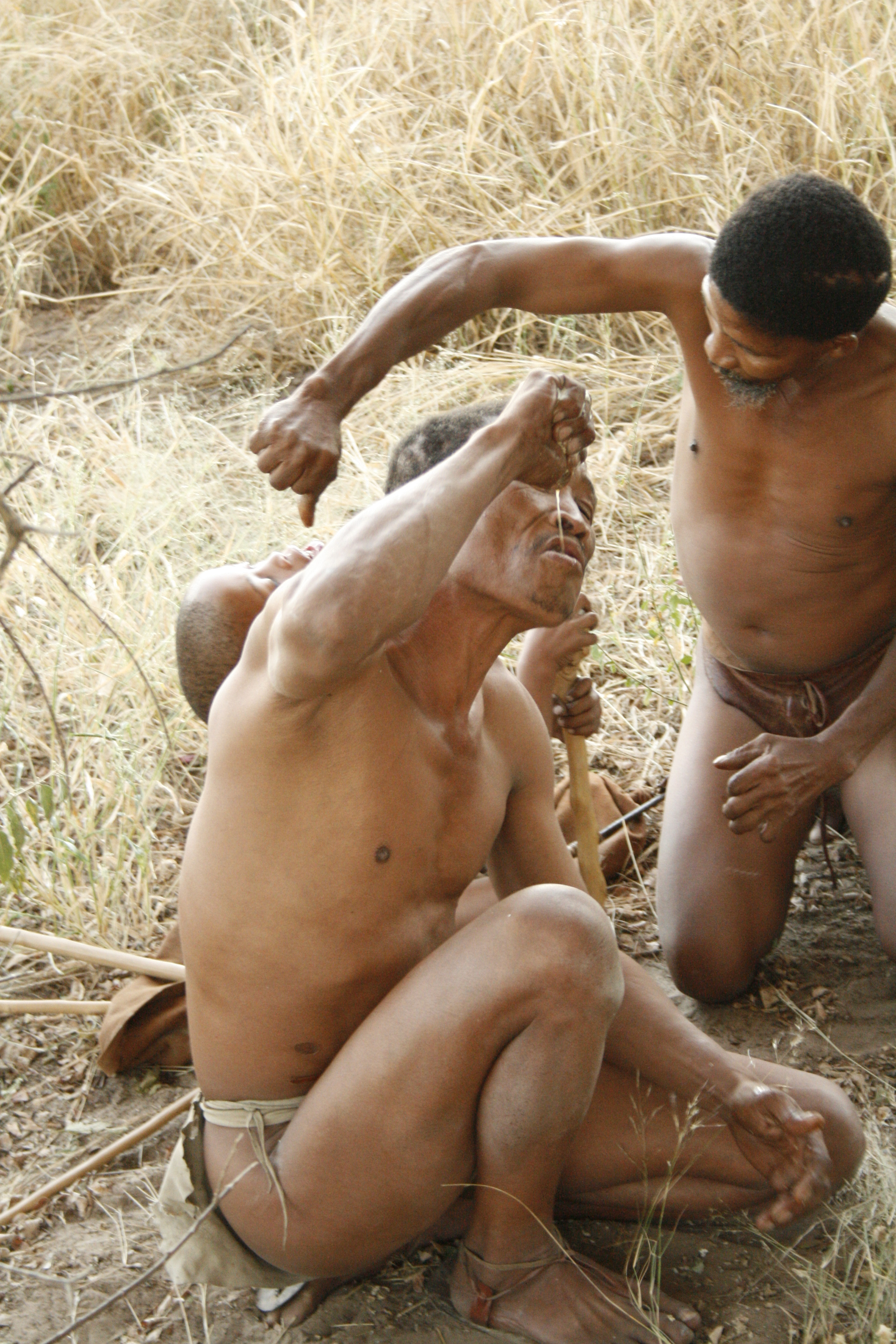
Drinking water from the bi bulb plant

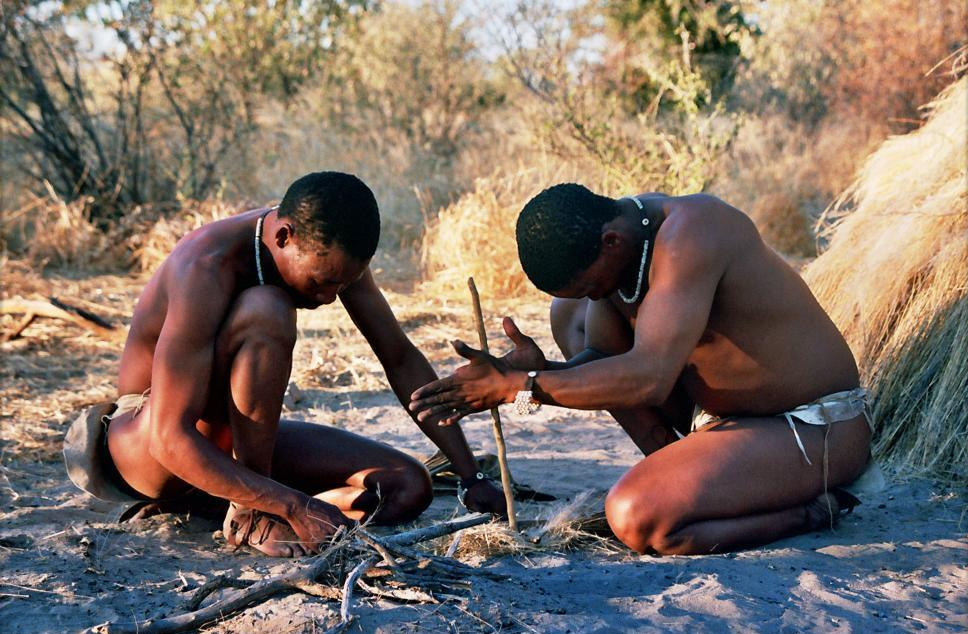
Starting a fire by hand

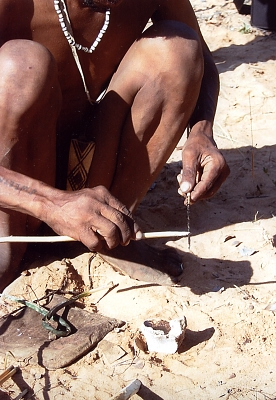
Preparing poison arrows

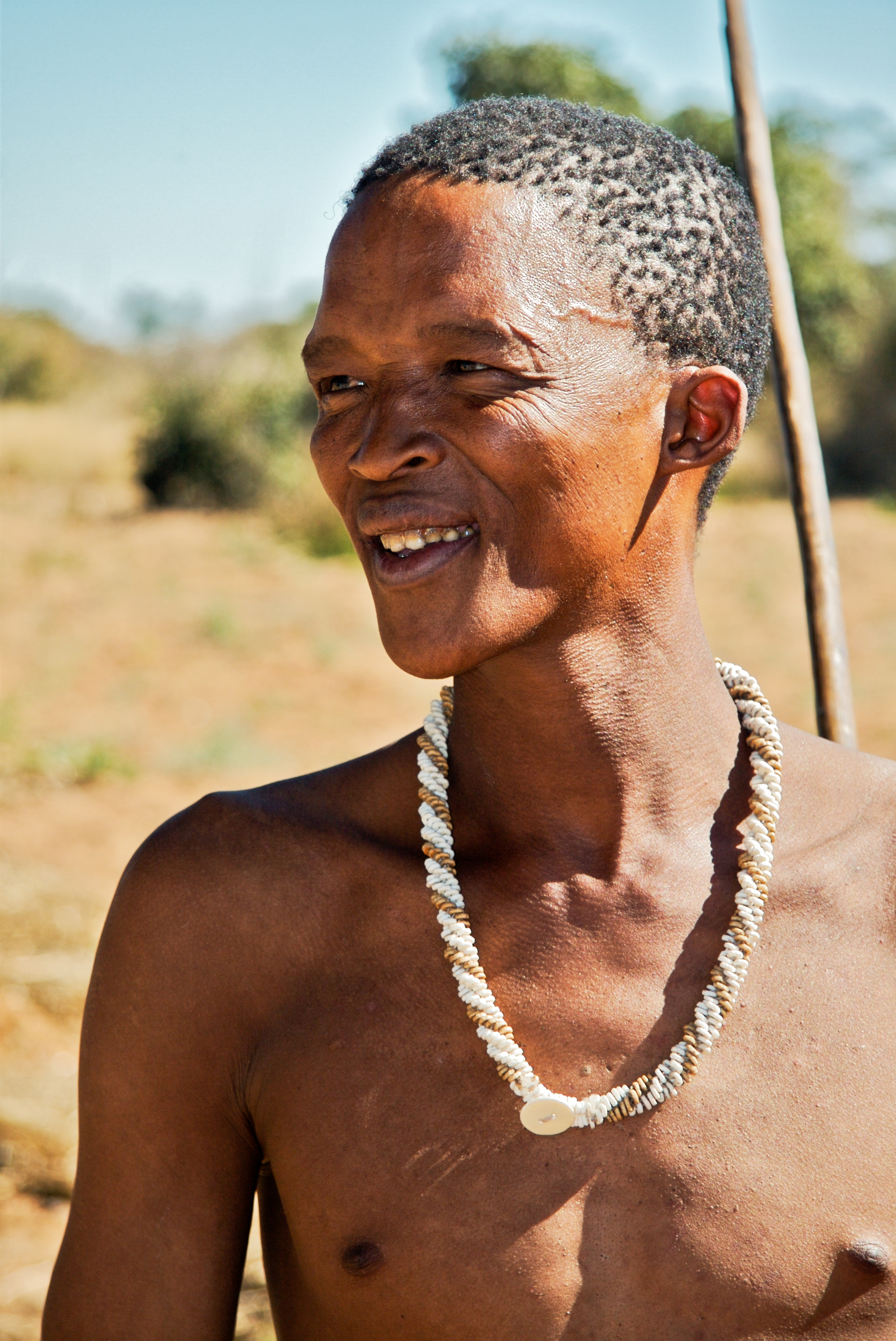
San man from Namibia

The San kinship system reflects their history as traditionally small mobile foraging bands. San kinship is similar to Inuit kinship, which uses the same set of terms as in European cultures but adds a name rule and an age rule for determining what terms to use. The age rule resolves any confusion arising from kinship terms, as the older of two people always decides what to call the younger. Relatively few names circulate (approximately 35 names per sex), and each child is named after a grandparent or another relative, but never their parents.

Children have no social duties besides playing, and leisure is very important to San of all ages. Large amounts of time are spent in conversation, joking, music, and sacred dances. Women may be leaders of their own family groups. They may also make important family and group decisions and claim ownership of water holes and foraging areas. Women are mainly involved in the gathering of food, but sometimes also partake in hunting.

Water is important in San life. During long droughts, they make use of sip wells in order to collect water. To make a sip well, a San scrapes a deep hole where the sand is damp, and inserts a long hollow grass stem into the hole. An empty ostrich egg is used to collect the water. Water is sucked into the straw from the sand, into the mouth, and then travels down another straw into the ostrich egg.

Traditionally, the San were an egalitarian society. Although they had hereditary chiefs, their authority was limited. The San made decisions among themselves by consensus, with women treated as relative equals in decision making. San economy was a gift economy, based on giving each other gifts regularly rather than on trading or purchasing goods and services.

As of 1994, about 95% of San relationships were monogamous.

=== Subsistence ===
Villages range in sturdiness from nightly rain shelters in the warm spring (when people move constantly in search of budding greens), to formalized rings, wherein people congregate in the dry season around permanent waterholes. Early spring is the hardest season: a hot dry period following the cool, dry winter, when most plants are still dead or dormant, and supplies of autumn nuts are exhausted. Meat is particularly important in the dry months when wildlife cannot range far from the receding waters.

Women gather fruit, berries, tubers, bush onions, and other plant materials for the band's consumption. Ostrich eggs are gathered, and the empty shells are used as water containers. Insects provide perhaps 10% of animal proteins consumed, most often during the dry season. Depending on location, the San consume 18 to 104 species, including grasshoppers, beetles, caterpillars, moths, butterflies, and termites.

Women's traditional gathering gear is simple and effective: a hide sling, a blanket, a cloak called a kaross to carry foods, firewood, smaller bags, a digging stick, and perhaps, a smaller version of the kaross to carry a baby.

Men, and presumably women when they accompany them, hunt in long, laborious tracking excursions. They kill their game using bow and arrows and spears tipped in diamphotoxin, a slow-acting arrow poison produced by beetle larvae of the genus Diamphidia.

=== Early history ===
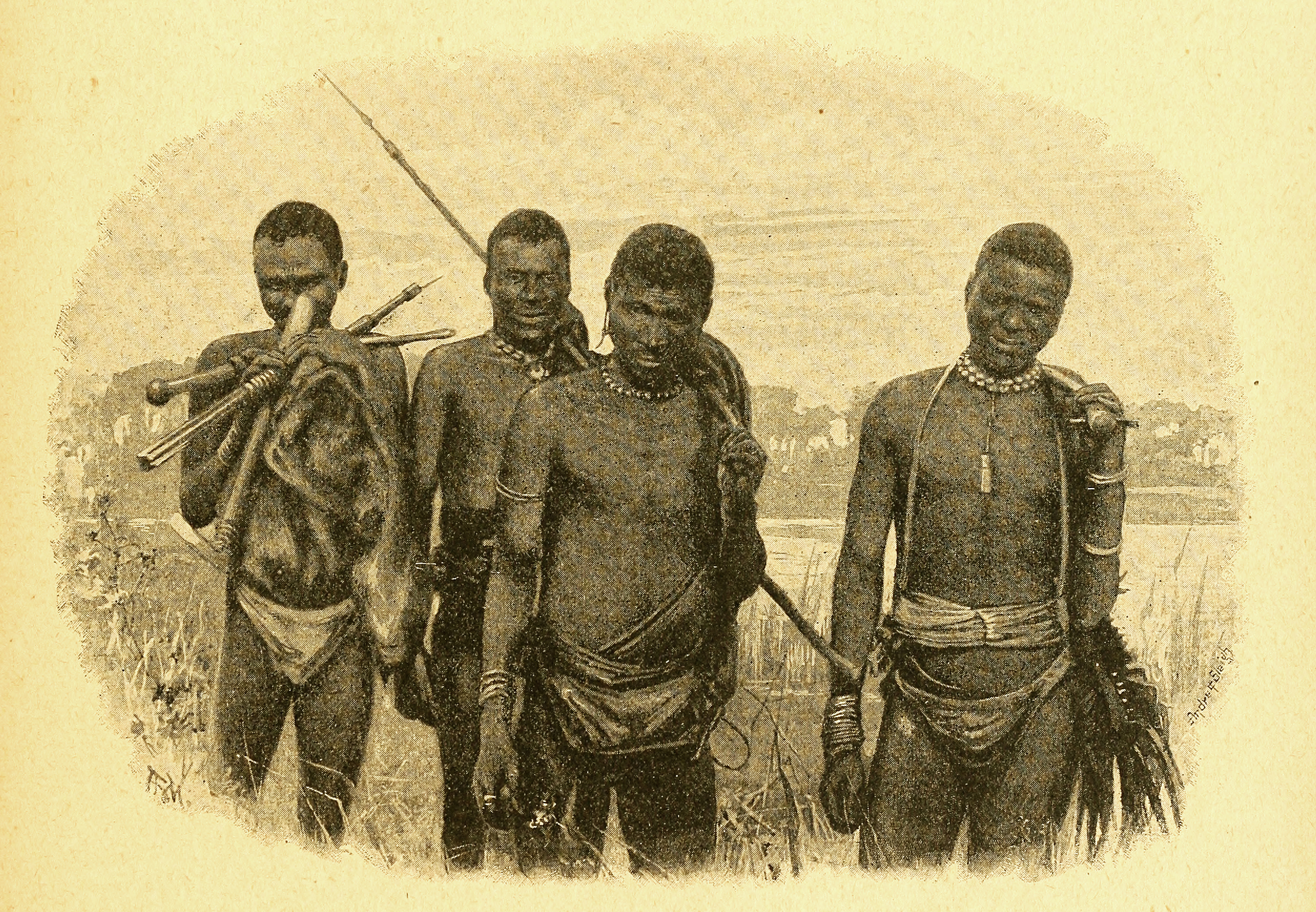
Wandering hunters (Masarwa Bushmen), North Kalahari desert, published in 1892 (from H. A. Bryden photogr.)

A set of tools almost identical to that used by the modern San and dating to 42,000 BCE was discovered at Border Cave in KwaZulu-Natal in 2012.

In 2006, what is thought to be the world's oldest ritual is interpreted as evidence which would make the San culture the oldest still practiced culture today.

Historical evidence shows that certain San communities have always lived in the desert regions of the Kalahari; however, eventually nearly all other San communities in southern Africa were forced into this region. The Kalahari San remained in poverty where their richer neighbours denied them rights to the land. Before long, in both Botswana and Namibia, they found their territory drastically reduced.

== Genetics ==
Various Y chromosome studies show that the San carry some of the most divergent (earliest branching) human Y-chromosome haplogroups. These haplogroups are specific sub-groups of haplogroups A and B, the two earliest branches on the human Y-chromosome tree.

Mitochondrial DNA studies also provide evidence that the San carry high frequencies of the earliest haplogroup branches in the human mitochondrial DNA tree. This DNA is inherited only from one's mother. The most divergent (earliest branching) mitochondrial haplogroup, L0d, has been identified at its highest frequencies in the southern African San groups.

In a study published in March 2011, Brenna Henn and colleagues found that the ǂKhomani San, as well as the Sandawe and Hadza peoples of Tanzania, were the most genetically diverse of any living humans studied. This high degree of genetic diversity hints at the origin of anatomically modern humans.

A 2008 study suggested that the San may have been isolated from other original ancestral groups for as much as 50,000 to 100,000 years and later rejoined, re-integrating into the rest of the human gene pool.

A 2016 DNA study of fully sequenced genomes showed that the ancestors of today's San hunter-gatherers began to diverge from other human populations in Africa about 200,000 years ago and were fully isolated by 100,000 years ago.

A 2017 DNA study on 3 2,000 year-old high-coverage ancient San samples from KwaZulu-Natal, South Africa, without genetic contributions from either Bantu or East African/Eurasian admixture allowed Schlebusch and colleagues to estimate that the San split from other human lineages 360,000-260,000 years ago.

== Ancestral land conflict in Botswana ==
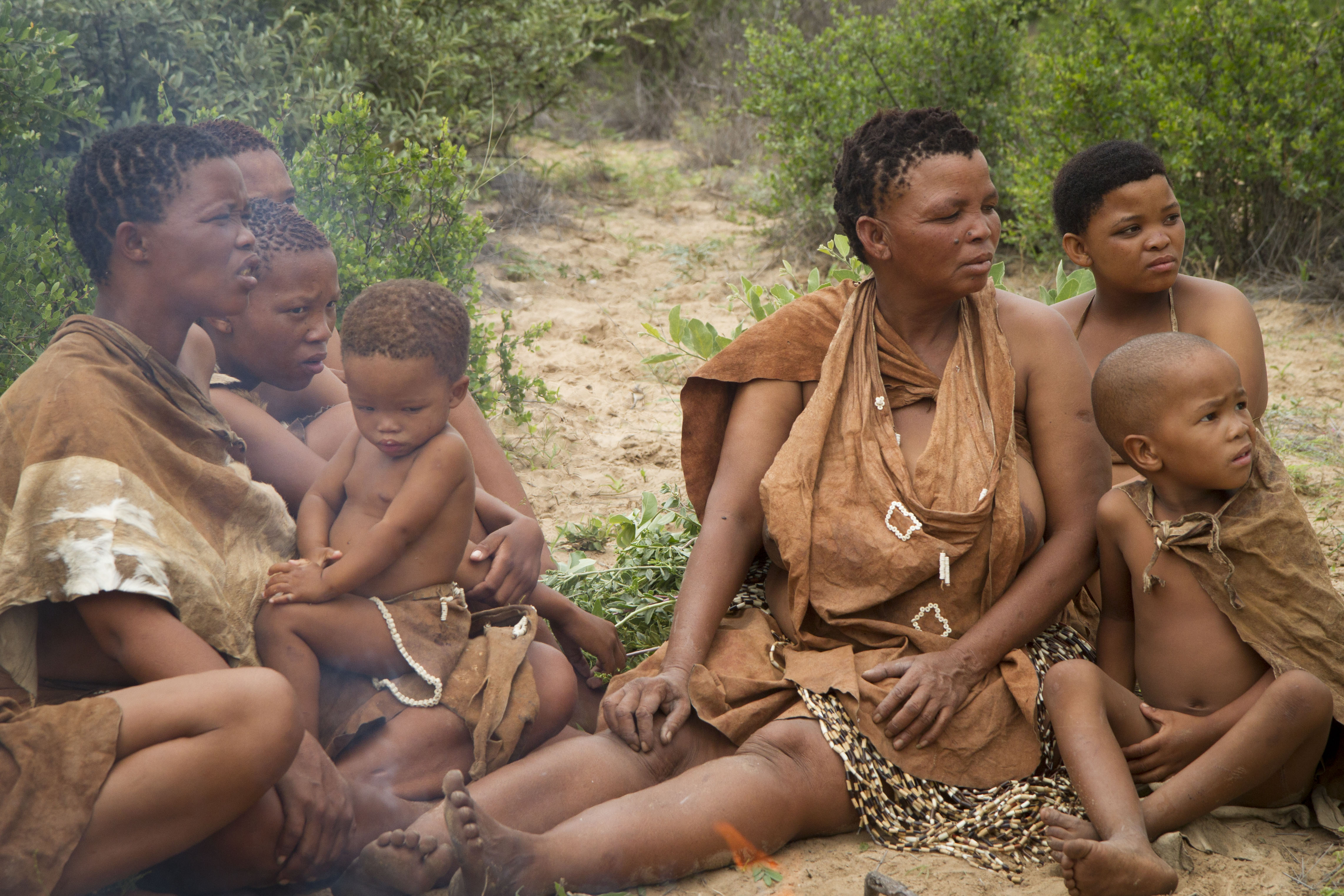
San family in Botswana

According to professors Robert K. Hitchcock, Wayne A. Babchuk, "In 1652, when Europeans established a full-time presence in Southern Africa, there were some 300,000 San and 600,000 Khoekhoe in Southern Africa. During the early phases of European colonization, tens of thousands of Khoekhoe and San peoples lost their lives as a result of genocide, murder, physical mistreatment, and disease. There were cases of "Bushman hunting" in which commandos (mobile paramilitary units or posses) sought to dispatch San and Khoekhoe in various parts of Southern Africa.

Much aboriginal people's land in Botswana, including land occupied by the San people (or Basarwa), was conquered during colonization. Loss of land and access to natural resources continued after Botswana's independence. The San have been particularly affected by encroachment by majority peoples and non-indigenous farmers onto their traditional land. Government policies from the 1970s transferred a significant area of traditionally San land to majority agro-pastoralist tribes and white settlers. Much of the government's policy regarding land tended to favor the dominant Tswana peoples over the minority San and Bakgalagadi. Loss of land is a major contributor to the problems facing Botswana's indigenous people, including especially the San's eviction from the Central Kalahari Game Reserve. The government of Botswana decided to relocate all of those living within the reserve to settlements outside it. Harassment of residents, dismantling of infrastructure, and bans on hunting appear to have been used to induce residents to leave. The government has denied that any of the relocation was forced. A legal battle followed. The relocation policy may have been intended to facilitate diamond mining by Gem Diamonds within the reserve.

== Hoodia traditional knowledge agreement ==
Hoodia gordonii, used by the San, was patented by the South African Council for Scientific and Industrial Research (CSIR) in 1998, for its presumed appetite suppressing quality, although, according to a 2006 review, no published scientific evidence supported hoodia as an appetite suppressant in humans. A licence was granted to Phytopharm, for development of the active ingredient in the Hoodia plant, p57 (glycoside), to be used as a pharmaceutical drug for dieting. Once this patent was brought to the attention of the San, a benefit-sharing agreement was reached between them and the CSIR in 2003. This would award royalties to the San for the benefits of their indigenous knowledge. During the case, the San people were represented and assisted by the Working Group of Indigenous Minorities in Southern Africa (WIMSA), the South African San Council and the South African San Institute.

This benefit-sharing agreement is one of the first to give royalties to the holders of traditional knowledge used for drug sales. The terms of the agreement are contentious, because of their apparent lack of adherence to the Bonn Guidelines on Access to Genetic Resources and Benefit Sharing, as outlined in the Convention on Biological Diversity (CBD). The San have yet to profit from this agreement, as P57 has still not yet been legally developed and marketed.

== Representation in mass media ==
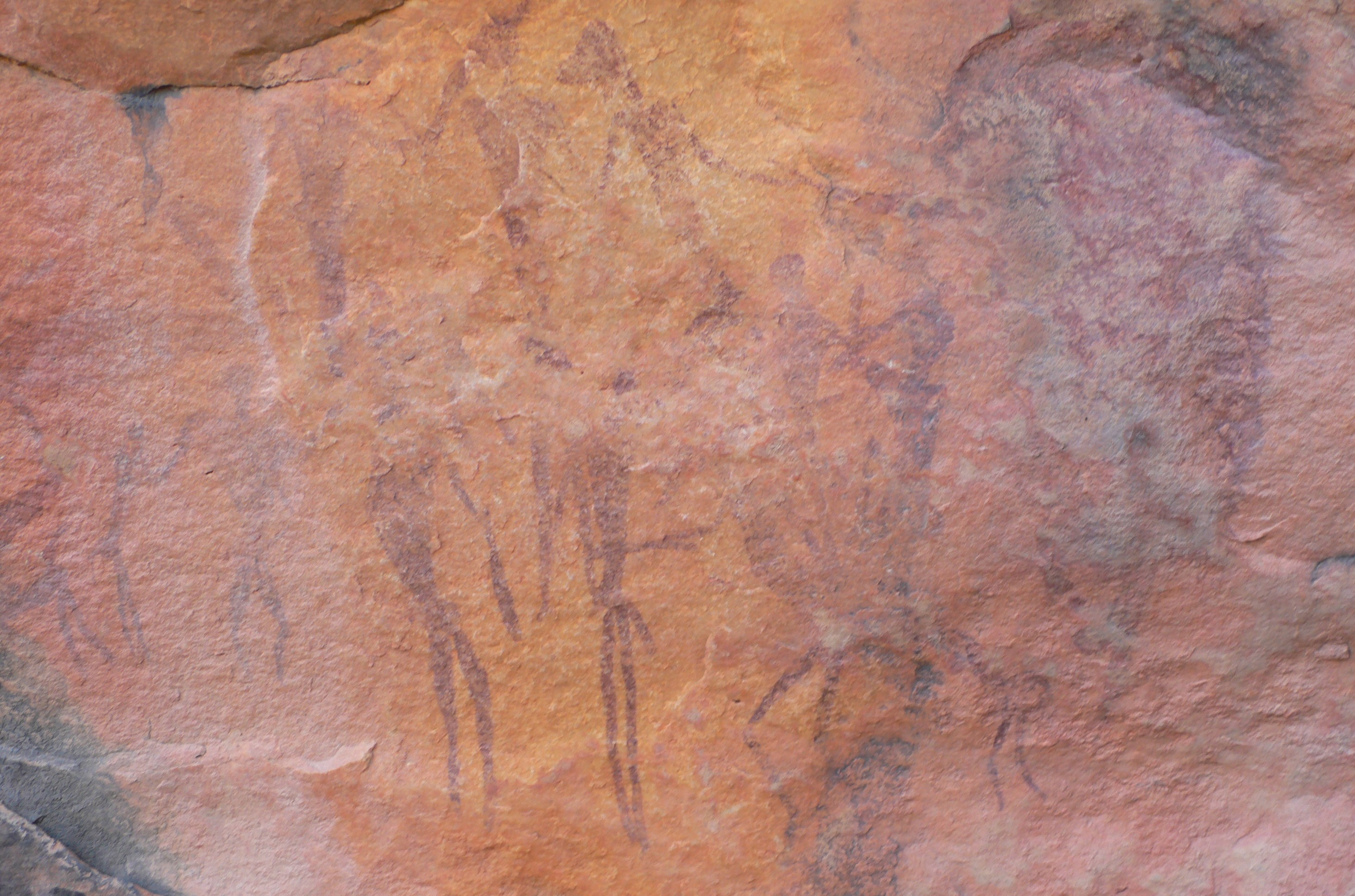
Rock paintings in the Cederberg, Western Cape

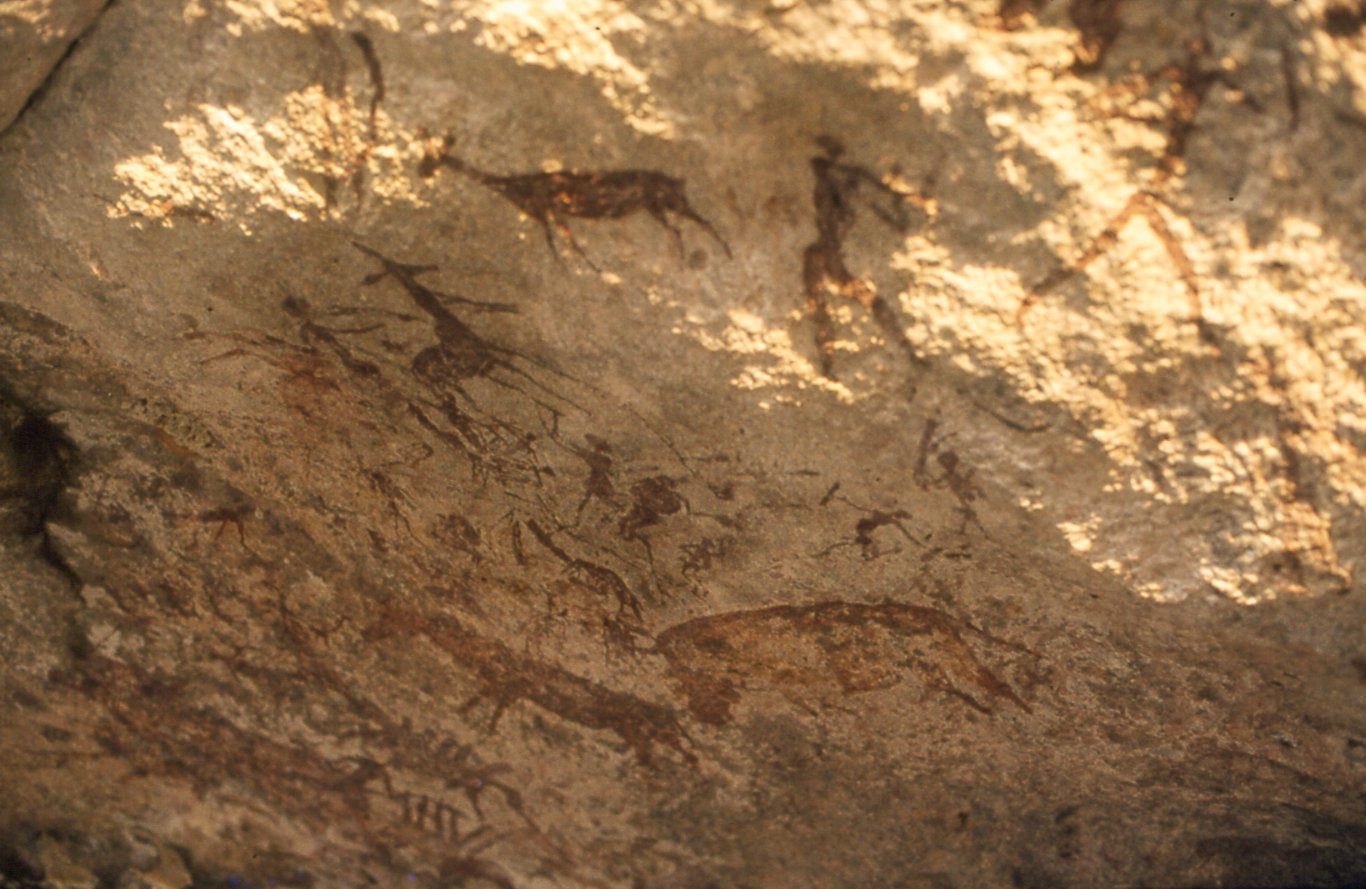
San paintings near Murewa, Zimbabwe

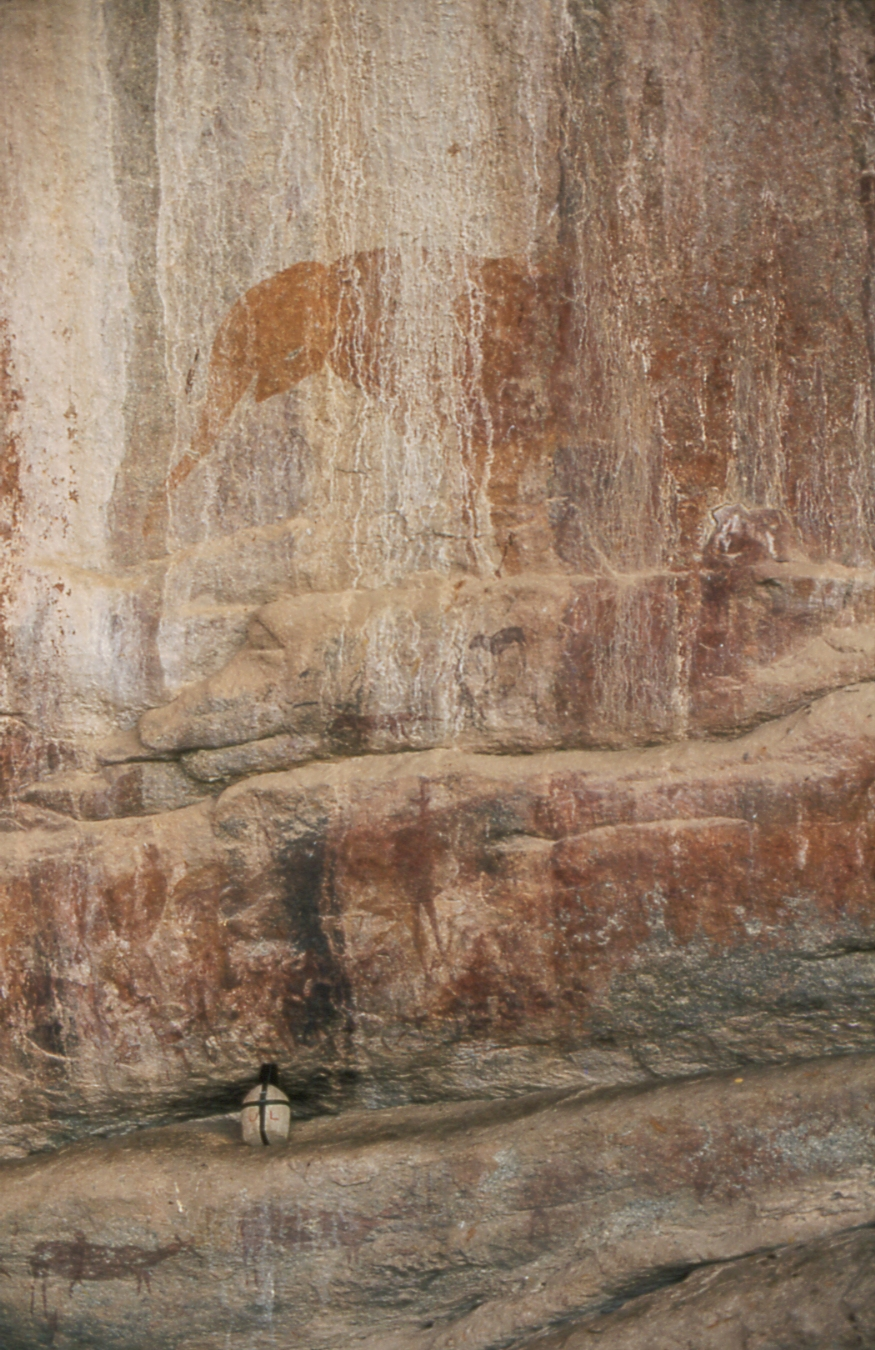
San paintings near Murewa

=== Early representations ===
The San of the Kalahari were first brought to the globalized world's attention in the 1950s by South African author Laurens van der Post. Van der Post grew up in South Africa, and had a respectful lifelong fascination with native African cultures. In 1955, he was commissioned by the BBC to go to the Kalahari desert with a film crew in search of the San. The filmed material was turned into a very popular six-part television documentary a year later. Driven by a lifelong fascination with this "vanished tribe", Van der Post published a 1958 book about this expedition, entitled The Lost World of the Kalahari. It was to be his most famous book.

In 1961, he published The Heart of the Hunter, a narrative which he admits in the introduction uses two previous works of stories and mythology as "a sort of Stone Age Bible", namely Specimens of Bushman Folklore' (1911), collected by Wilhelm H. I. Bleek and Lucy C. Lloyd, and Dorothea Bleek's Mantis and His Friend. Van der Post's work brought indigenous African cultures to millions of people around the world for the first time, but some people disparaged it as part of the subjective view of a European in the 1950s and 1960s, stating that he branded the San as simple "children of Nature" or even "mystical ecologists". In 1992 by John Perrot and team published the book Bush for the Bushman – a "desperate plea" on behalf of the aboriginal San addressing the international community and calling on the governments throughout Southern Africa to respect and reconstitute the ancestral land-rights of all San.

=== Documentaries and non-fiction ===
John Marshall, the son of Harvard anthropologist Lorna Marshall, documented the lives of San in the Nyae Nyae region of Namibia over a period spanning more than 50-years. His early film The Hunters, shows a giraffe hunt. A Kalahari Family (2002) is a series documenting 50 years in the lives of the Juǀʼhoansi of Southern Africa, from 1951 to 2000.

His sister Elizabeth Marshall Thomas wrote several books and numerous articles about the San, based in part on her experiences living with these people when their culture was still intact. The Harmless People, published in 1959, and The Old Way: A Story of the First People, published in 2006, are two of them.

John Marshall and Adrienne Miesmer documented the lives of the ǃKung San people between the 1950s and 1978 in Nǃai, the Story of a ǃKung Woman. This film is an account of a woman who grew up while the San lived as autonomous hunter-gatherers, but who later was forced into a dependent life in the government-created community at Tsumkwe, a reservation too small to support them.

South African film-maker Richard Wicksteed has produced a number of documentaries on San culture, history and present situation; these include In God's Places / Iindawo ZikaThixo (1995) on the San cultural legacy in the southern Drakensberg; Death of a Bushman (2002) on the murder of San tracker Optel Rooi by South African police; The Will To Survive (2009), which covers the history and situation of San communities in southern Africa today; and My Land is My Dignity (2009) on the San's epic land rights struggle in Botswana's Central Kalahari Game Reserve.

A documentary on San hunting entitled, The Great Dance: A Hunter's Story (2000), directed by Damon and Craig Foster. This was reviewed by Lawrence Van Gelder for the New York Times, who said that the film "constitutes an act of preservation and a requiem."

Spencer Wells's 2003 book The Journey of Man—in connection with National Geographic's Genographic Project—discusses a genetic analysis of the San and asserts their genetic markers were the first ones to split from those of the ancestors of the bulk of other Homo sapiens sapiens. The PBS documentary based on the book follows these markers throughout the world, demonstrating that all of humankind can be traced back to the African continent (see Recent African origin of modern humans, the so-called "out of Africa" hypothesis).

The BBC's The Life of Mammals (2003) series includes video footage of an indigenous San of the Kalahari desert undertaking a persistence hunt of a kudu through harsh desert conditions. It provides an illustration of how early man may have pursued and captured prey with minimal weaponry.

The BBC series How Art Made the World (2005) compares San cave paintings from 200 years ago to Paleolithic European paintings that are 14,000 years old. The presenter Nigel Spivey draws largely on the work of Professor David Lewis-Williams, whose PhD was entitled "Believing and Seeing: Symbolic meanings in southern San rock paintings". Lewis-Williams draws parallels with prehistoric art around the world.

=== Films and music ===
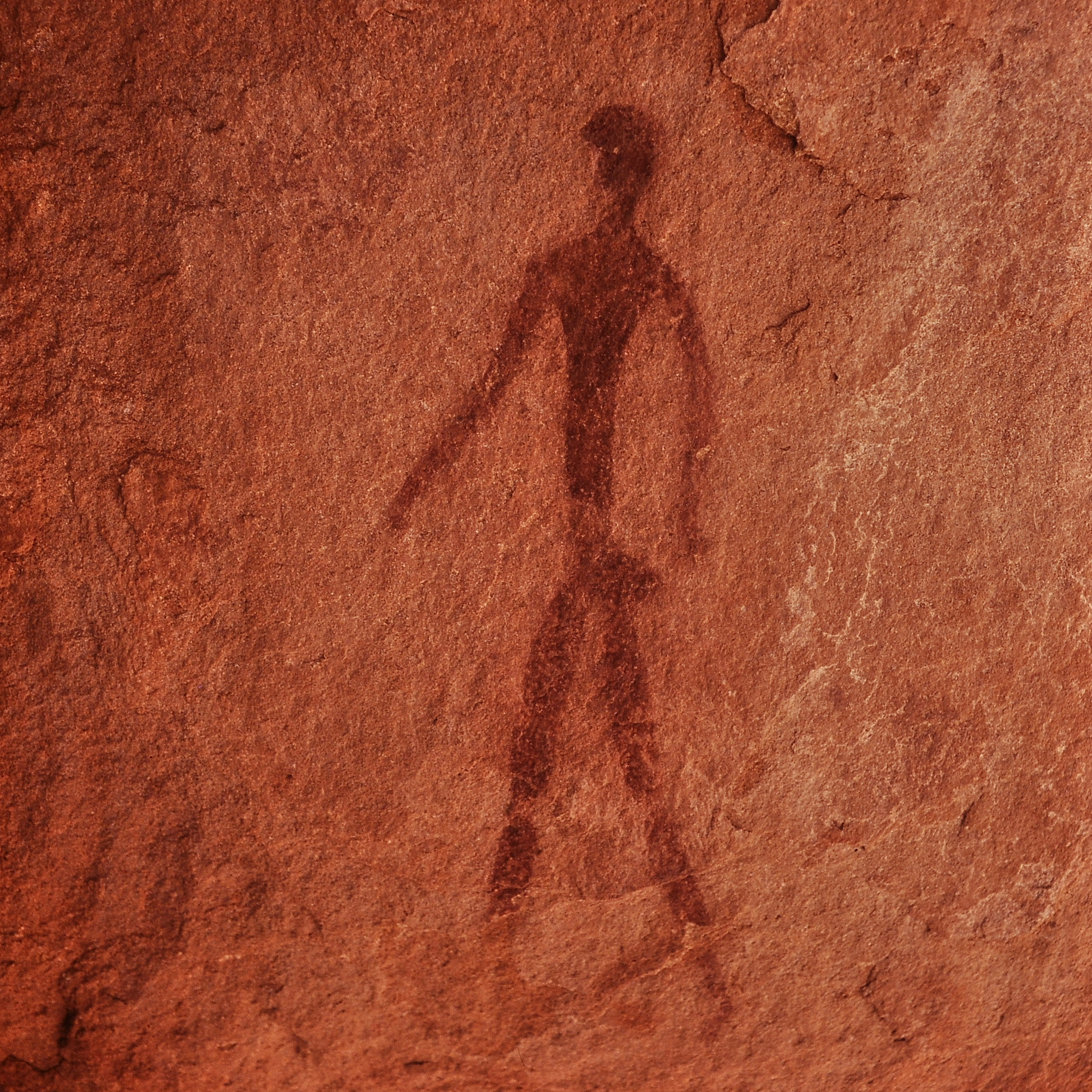
Rock painting of a man in Twyfelfontein valley

A 1969 film, Lost in the Desert, features a small boy, stranded in the desert, who encounters a group of wandering San. They help him and then abandon him as a result of a misunderstanding created by the lack of a common language and culture. The film was directed by Jamie Uys, who returned to the San a decade later with The Gods Must Be Crazy, which proved to be an international hit. This comedy portrays a Kalahari San group's first encounter with an artifact from the outside world (a Coca-Cola bottle). By the time this movie was made, the ǃKung had recently been forced into sedentary villages, and the San hired as actors were confused by the instructions to act out inaccurate exaggerations of their almost abandoned hunting and gathering life.

"Eh Hee" by Dave Matthews Band was written as an evocation of the music and culture of the San. In a story told to the Radio City audience (an edited version of which appears on the DVD version of Live at Radio City), Matthews recalls hearing the music of the San and, upon asking his guide what the words to their songs were, being told that "there are no words to these songs, because these songs, we've been singing since before people had words." He goes on to describe the song as his "homage to meeting... the most advanced people on the planet."

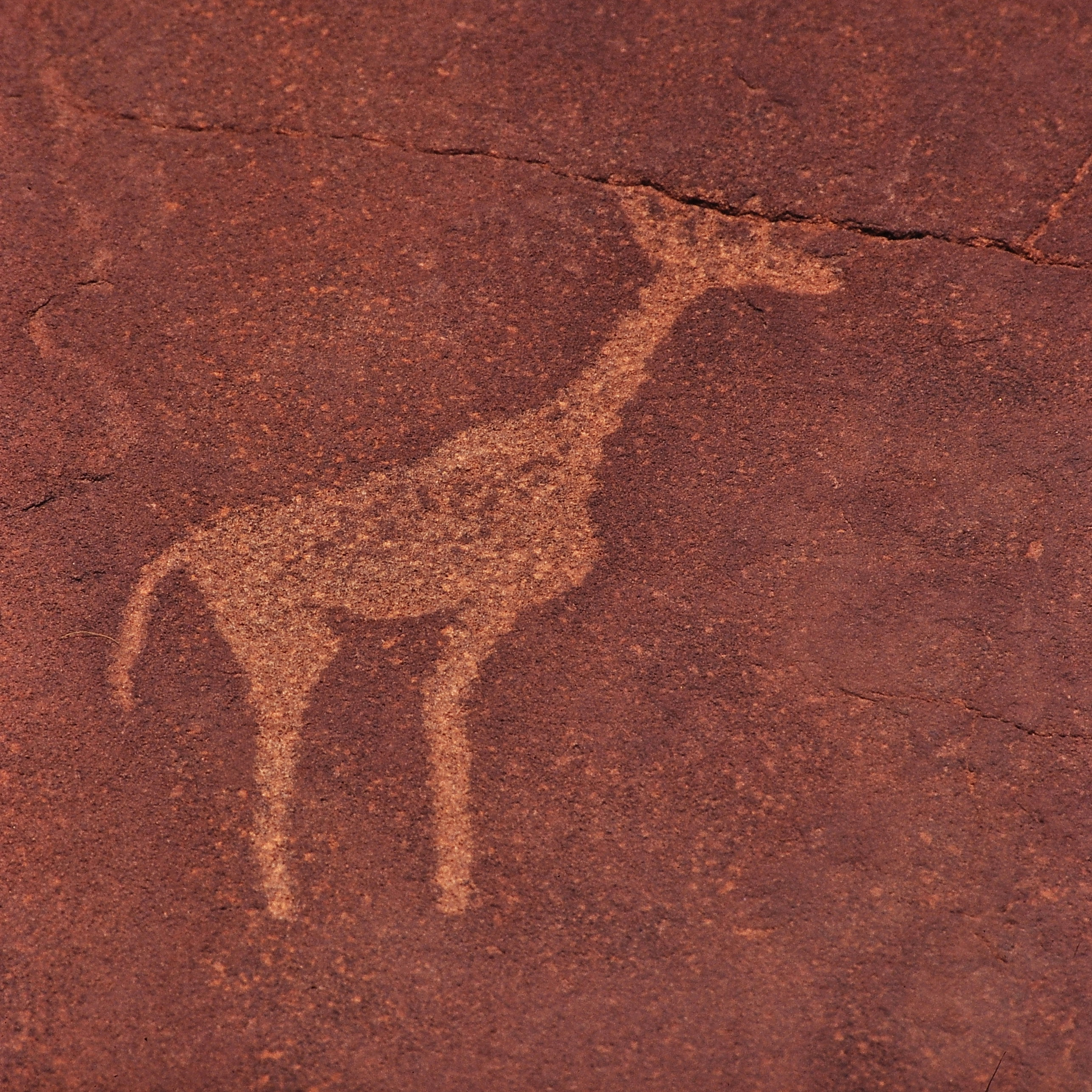
Rock engraving of a giraffe in Twyfelfontein valley

=== Memoirs ===
In Peter Godwin's memoir When a Crocodile Eats the Sun, he mentions his time spent with the San for an assignment. His title comes from the San's belief that a solar eclipse occurs when a crocodile eats the sun.

=== Novels ===
Laurens van der Post's two novels, A Story Like The Wind (1972) and its sequel, A Far Off Place (1974), made into a 1993 film, are about a white boy encountering a wandering San and his wife, and how the San's life and survival skills save the white teenagers' lives in a journey across the desert.

James A. Michener's The Covenant (1980) is a work of historical fiction centered on South Africa. The first section of the book concerns a San community's journey set roughly in 13,000 BCE.

In Wilbur Smith's novel The Burning Shore (an instalment in the Courtneys of Africa book series), the San people are portrayed through two major characters, O'wa and H'ani; Smith describes the San's struggles, history, and beliefs in great detail. San characters also appear in many of his other books, often working as trackers and guides for Smith's main characters.

Norman Rush's 1991 novel Mating features an encampment of Basarwa near the (imaginary) Botswana town where the main action is set.

Tad Williams's epic Otherland series of novels features a South African San named ǃXabbu, whom Williams confesses to be highly fictionalized, and not necessarily an accurate representation. In the novel, Williams invokes aspects of San mythology and culture.

In 2007, David Gilman published The Devil's Breath. One of the main characters, a small San boy named ǃKoga, uses traditional methods to help the character Max Gordon travel across Namibia.

Alexander McCall Smith has written a series of episodic novels set in Gaborone, the capital of Botswana. The fiancé of the protagonist of The No. 1 Ladies' Detective Agency series, Mr. J. L. B. Matekoni, adopts two orphaned San children, sister and brother Motholeli and Puso.

The San feature in several of the novels by Michael Stanley (the nom de plume of Michael Sears and Stanley Trollip), particularly in Death of the Mantis.

In Christopher Hope's book Darkest England, the San hero, David Mungo Booi, is tasked by his fellow tribesmen with asking the Queen for the protection once promised, and to evaluate the possibility of creating a colony on the island. He discovered England in the manner of 19th century Western explorers.

== Notable individuals ==
=== ǃKung ===
- Nǃxau ǂToma
- Royal ǀUiǀoǀoo

=== Gǁana ===
- Roy Sesana

=== ǀXam ===
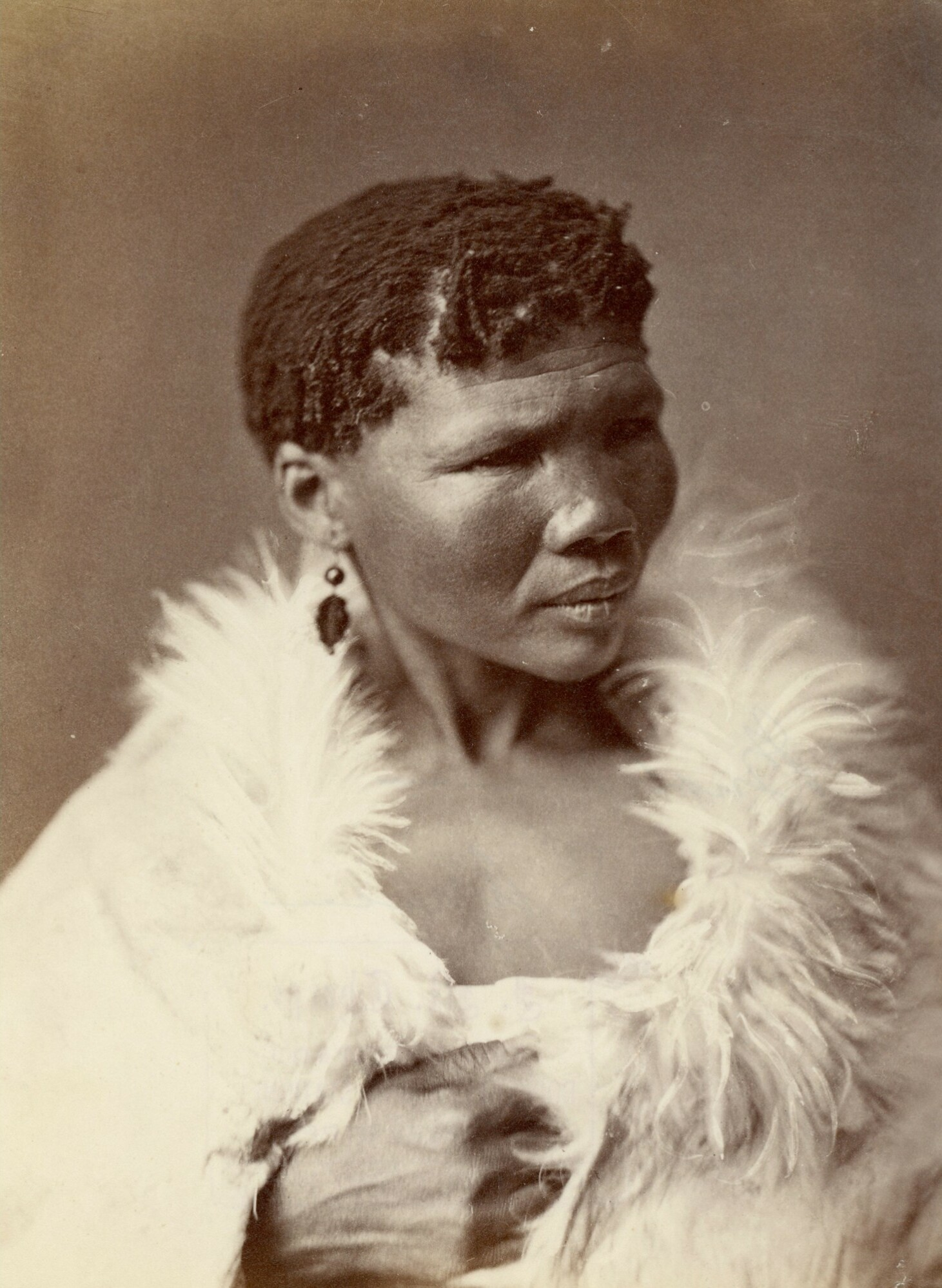
A photograph of ǃKweiten-ta-ǁKen when she was in Mowbray in 1874–1875

- Diaǃkwain
- ǁKabbo
- ǃKweiten ta ǁKen

=== ǂKhomani or Nǁnǂe ===
- Dawid Kruiper (Khoekhoe-speaking)
- Elsie Vaalbooi (Nǁng-speaking)
- Katrina Esau (Nǁng-speaking)

=== Naro ===
- Cgʼose Ntcoxʼo
- Coexʼae Qgam

== See also ==
- First People of the Kalahari
- Kalahari Debate
- Khoisan
- Negro of Banyoles
- Botswanan art § San art
- Strandloper
- Vaalpens
- Contemporary San Art
- !Khwa ttu

== Bibliography ==
- Shostak, Marjorie (1983). Nisa: The Life and Words of a ǃKung Woman. New York: Vintage Books. ISBN 0-7139-1486-6.
