= Botswana art =

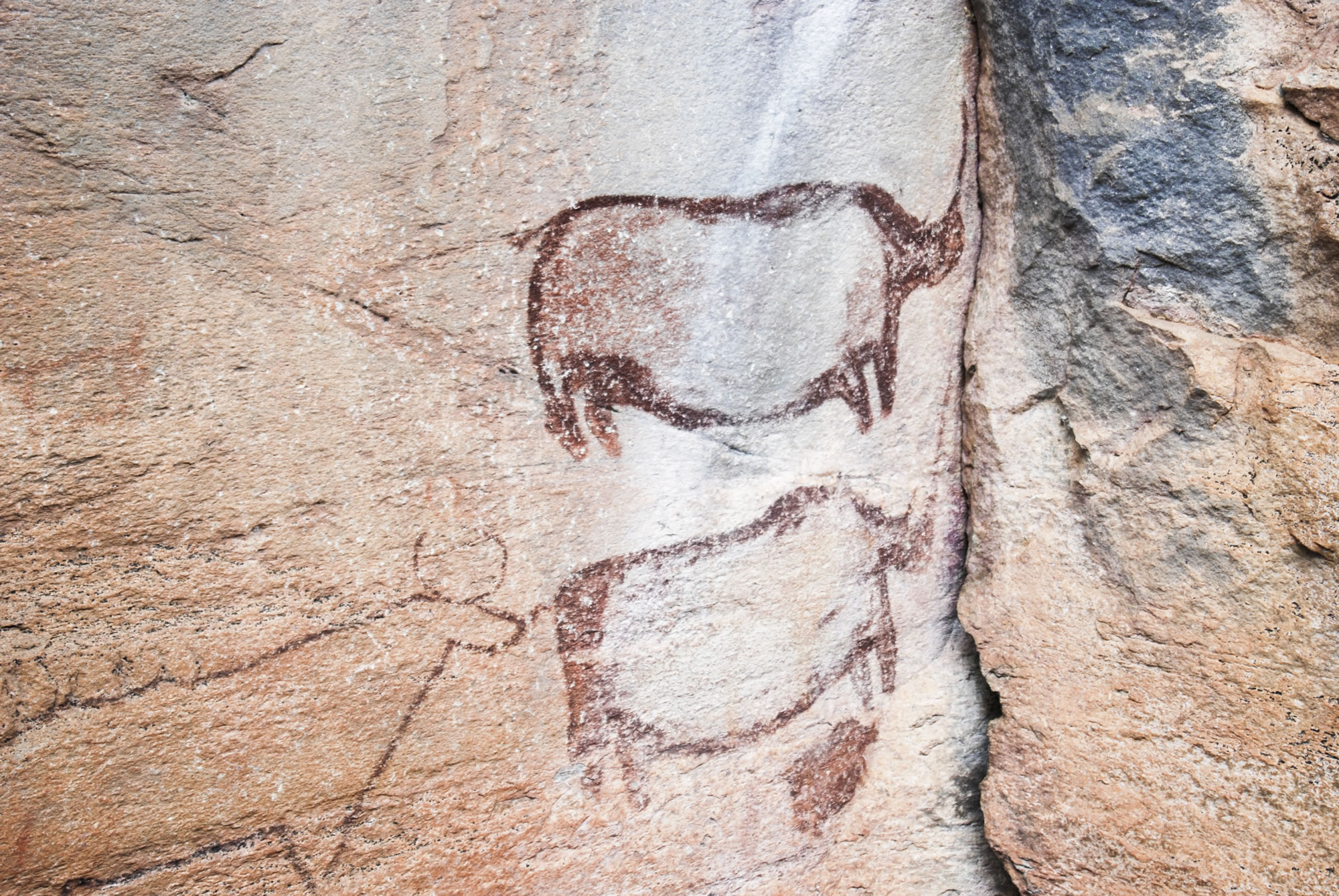
San rock art at the UNESCO World Heritage Site of Tsodilo

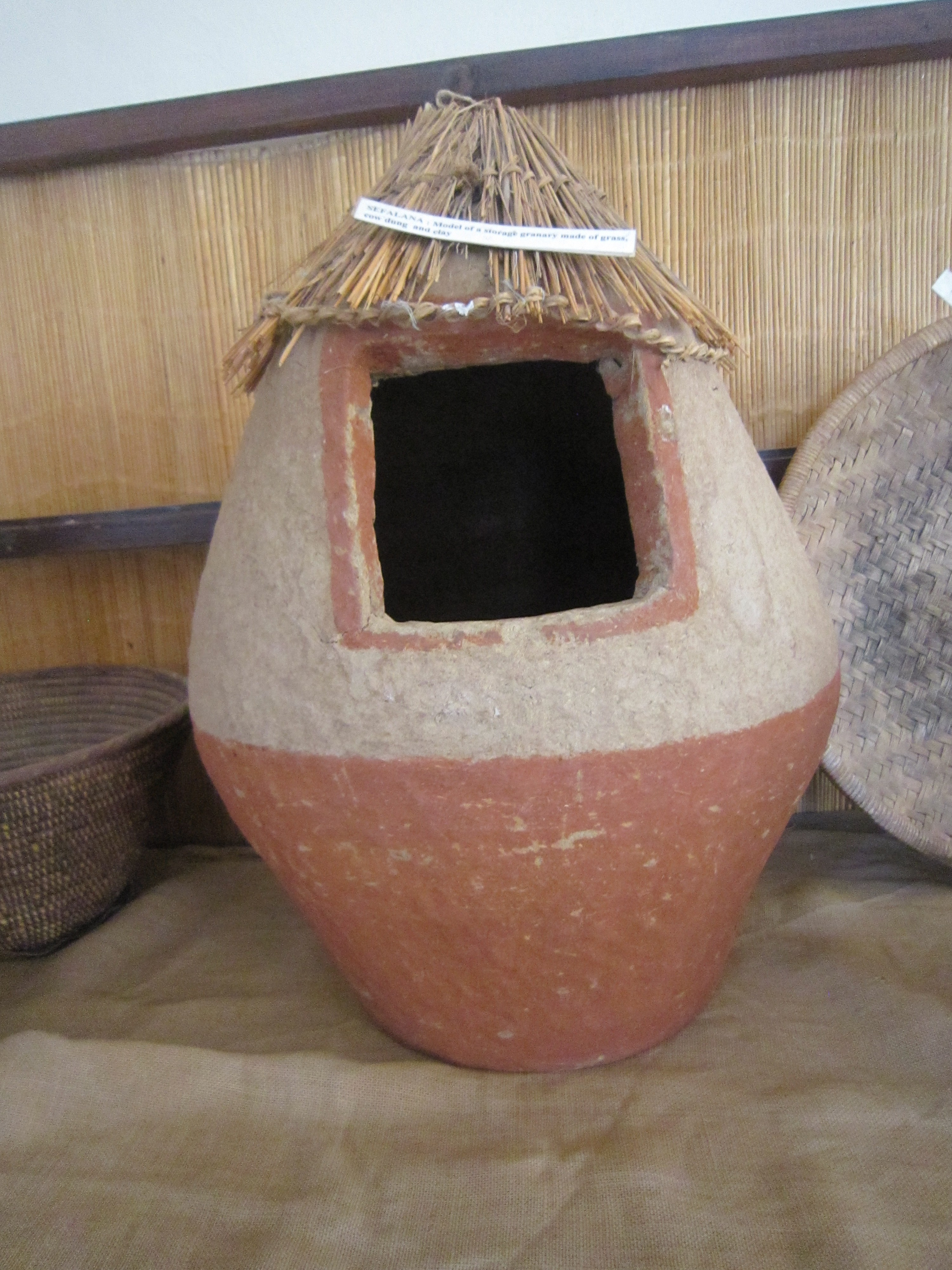
Part of the collection at the Phuthadikabo Museum, Botswana

The visual art of Botswana has varied among the different ethnic groups and throughout history. Historically it has fallen into two main categories: that of the San peoples (also known as the Bushmen) and that of the Bantu-derived peoples such as the Batswana.

== San art ==
The first is of greater antiquity in origin and includes the decoration of many of the devices and equipment the San needed for desert existence. Items such as ostrich shells, clay water filters, animal skins, arrows, bows and pots often received added decoration by way of incised or relief decoration, imprinted pottery decoration, beading and carving. These tribes also carved art objects that had no other function, most often animals.

More ancient art is that of San rock art, for which the San are justifiably famous: right across the South-East African region their ancestors left dynamic paintings on rock faces and cave walls, executed in unknown and highly resilient pigments that have lasted millennia. Depictions of animals, hunts, ceremonies and dances are common. The Tsodilo Hills in Botswana were recognised as a UNESCO World Heritage Site in 2001, containing some 4,500 rock paintings in total; not all the art covered by this designation is by San people or their ancestors. Most paintings may be from the last 1000 or 2000 years, although much older dates are sometimes claimed. It is difficult to date most paintings; often radiocarbon dating methods can be used for materials on the floor of a shelter, but these may not relate to the dates of the art.

== Bantu art ==
Tswana and other Bantu peoples' art is more similar to that of Bantu peoples in the rest of southeastern Africa. Sophisticated carvings of stone and wood (usually of animals or people), sculptures and pottery; 'township' art made of disca instruments, carved walking sticks, knobkerries and many other art forms. One art that is particularly developed in Botswana is the preparation and marketing of hides and furs that have been stitched together, often combined in decorative panels using the different fur types and colours from different animals. These can have a definite use as well, being derived originally from the 'kaross' or desert blanket suited to the very cold conditions of the Kalahari at night and in winter. Woollen and crocheted blankets in local patterns are also popular. Basket weaving is also carried out to a high level of skill and variation.

There is a great deal of overlap between the two groups' artwork: for example the wire, ironwork and beads used in San items would have been obtained by trade from Bantu peoples, who themselves would have obtained some of their raw art material such as skins and animal horns from the San.

== Modern art ==
These days the art industry thrives in the production of items for tourist consumption. The Okavango swamp, some parts of the Kalahari desert tourist trail and various game reserves all support active local art industries. The major towns also have tourist galleries. Some artists, including white Botswana residents, paint two dimensional pictures of wildlife for the same market, which also includes various items such as T-shirts, hunting knives, shoes and hats. Leather-work is also popular, as are items made from legally culled or utilitarian urban objects such as bottle tops and wire; drums, beading, rattles, musical instruments such as the mbira and stringed animals such as elephant hair bracelets.

During Apartheid, South African artists in exile gathered in Botswana under the name Medu Art Ensemble to produce political artwork. The National Art Gallery at the Botswana National Museum displays traditional and contemporary art.
