= Ann Gollifer =

British-Guyanese artist (born 1960)

Ann Mary Gollifer (born 1960) is a British-Guyanese visual artist currently based in Gaborone, Botswana. Her work Mother Tongue can be seen on display in the Sainsbury African Galleries, a part of the British Museum's permanent collection.

== Biography ==
Gollifer was born in Mabaruma, in the north-west of British Guiana, now the Barima-Waini district of Guyana. Her mother is Warao-Arawak Amerindian and her father is English. In 1962 her parents re-located to the Solomon Islands and at the age of seven she was sent to boarding school at the Ursuline Convent in Brentwood, Essex. She went on to study English Literature and Art History at the University of Edinburgh from 1979, graduating with an honours degree in History of Art in 1983. She then worked in London at Christie's Contemporary Art before moving to Gaborone, Botswana, in 1985.

Gollifer worked as a Senior Technical Officer under the directorship of its founder, Alec Campbell, at the Botswana National Museum. During this period, she also worked part-time at the Phuthadikobo Museum in Mochudi with Sandy Grant, the museum's founder and director.

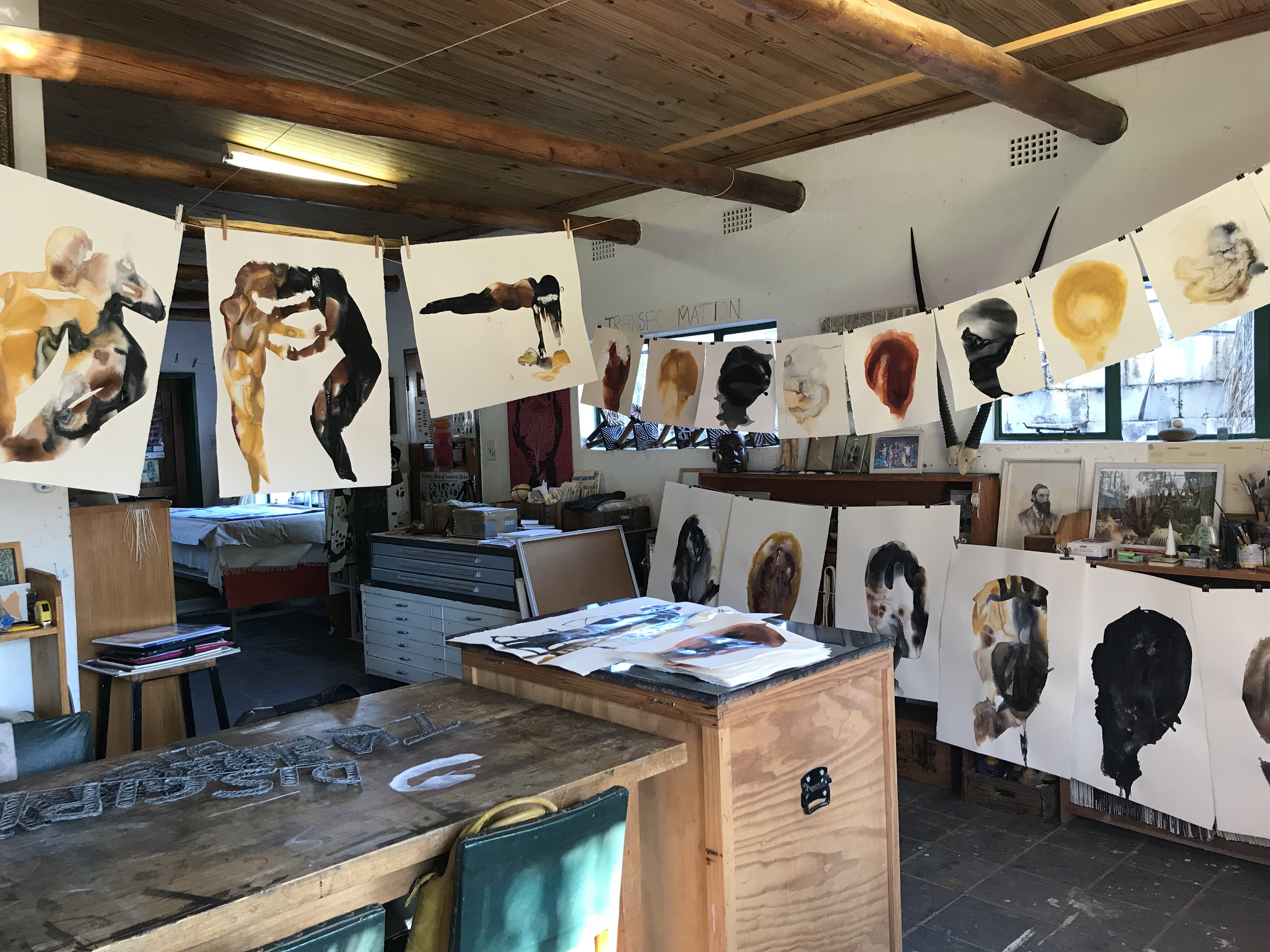
Gollifer's studio in Gaborone, Botswana

From 1991 to 2001 she was part of the committee involved with the administration and facilitation of the Thapong international artists workshops in Botswana. Initiated by Veryan Edwards in 1988, Thapong was an off shoot of the Triangle Arts Trust started by Robert Loder and Anthony Caro in 1982. An artist member of the Thapong committee, Gollifer helped organize international workshops as well as smaller local workshops annually and was part of the executive committee responsible for the building of the Thapong Visual Art Centre in Gaborone. Through the Thapong initiative, international artists would gather to share their material practice, which provided Gollifer with networks between artists, art historians and curators, such as Chris Spring, former curator of the Sainsbury African Galleries, British Museum, Polly Savage, SOAS University of London, Goddy Leye, Lutanda Mwamba, Baba Jaak, Vanessa Jackson, Diana Hyslop, Kagiso Patrick Mautloa and David Koloane.

Steve Jobson described Gollifer's works in his catalogue statement for the 2009 Artists in Botswana Exhibition, National Museum and Art Gallery, Gaborone: "Ann Gollifer is an artist who, through her personal search, has cut a path of innovation, technical and aesthetic excellence and ambitiousness which has made many of us explore our own limitations with more skepticism. Unsurprisingly, we are again subjected to a sensuous treat of the delicate and powerful."

== Exhibitions ==
=== Solo exhibitions ===
- Omang? – "Who are you?", Sophie Lalonde Art, Gaborone, Botswana, 2015
- Branded, The Frame Gallery, Gaborone, Botswana, 2012
- Living on an Horizon – A tribute to Bessie Head, Circa on Jellicoe, The Everard Read Gallery, Johannesburg, South Africa, 2011
- What Am I Doing Here? Ke Dirang Ha?, Bicha Gallery, Gabriel's Wharf, South Bank, London, UK, 2010
- Linhas de Sangue, Territories of the Heart, Museu Nacional de Arte, Maputo, Mozambique, 2006

=== Collaborative or group exhibitions ===
- Love Is …, The BKhz Gallery, Braamfontein, Johannesburg, South Africa, 2019
- FIAC, represented by Guns & Rain, Paris, France, 2018
- Investec Art Fair, represented by Guns & Rain, Cape Town, South Africa, 2018
- Omang (with Shepherd Ndudzo), The AVA Gallery, Cape Town, South Africa, 2017
- Goddesses and Super Heroes, Everard Read Gallery, Johannesburg, South Africa 2009
- Word (with Sedireng Mothibatsela, Steve Jobson and Monica Mosarwa), the Grahamstown festival, The Monument, 2008
- Monomotapa, Fordsburg Studios, Johannesburg, South Africa, 2002
- Hoche Koche (with Steve Dyer and the Tumbuka Dance Company), premiered in Harare at HIFA, then toured Gaborone, The Grahamstown festival and the Dance Festival in Avignon, France, 2001, France and at the Dance Umbrella, Wits Theatre, Johannesburg, South Africa, 2002
- Three Women Three Perspectives (with Dada Coex'ae Qgam and Neo Matome), Cape Town, Durban, Johannesburg, Windhoek and Gaborone; funded and hosted by the Alliance Francaise, Botswana, 2000

== Public collections ==
- The Unisa Art Gallery Collection, Pretoria, South Africa
- The Sainsbury African Galleries, The British Museum, London, UK
- The Triangle International Art Workshops, New York, USA
- The Alliance Francaise, Johannesburg, South Africa
- The National Museum, Gaborone, Botswana
- The Thapong International Art Workshop, Gaborone, Botswana
- The Mbile Art Collection, Lusaka, Zambia
- Botswana Life Insurance Ltd., Gaborone, Botswana
- Bank of Botswana Art Collection, Gaborone, Botswana

== Bibliography ==
- 2015: Men with Tales (Eggsson Books) ISBN 978-99968-0-358-1
- 2015: A frog in her throat (Snow Moon Editions). ISBN 979-10-91596-10-7, 979-10-91596-09-1
- 2011: I don't know why I was created. DADA, Coex'Ae Qgam (with Jenny Egner, Eggsson Books). ISBN 978-99912-938-1-3
- 2004: The Nata Baobab (Botsalano Press). ISBN 99912-531-5-7

== Commissions ==
- Carter's suit, personalised suit for Carter Foster, the curator of the Whitney Museum of American Art, to wear to the Burning Man festival 2009, New York, USA
- "The Maitisong Dancers", mild steel and aluminium wall sculpture, 12 metres in length x 4 metres in height, Maitisong Theatre entrance, Gaborone, Botswana
- The Donor windows, entrance, Princess Marina Hospital, Gaborone, Botswana

== Residencies ==
- IASPIS Residency, Stockholm, Sweden, 2018
- The Fordsburg Artist Studios, The Bag Factory, Johannesburg, 2002

== Workshops ==
- Triangle, New York, USA, 2008
- Thupelo, South Africa, 2000
- Mbile, Zambia, 1998
- Thapong, Botswana 1991, 1993, 2001
