= Contemporary San art =

Art movement in Botswana and South Africa

Contemporary San Art
- Years active: 1990-present
- Location: Botswana
- Major figures: Coexʼae Qgam
- Influenced: !Xun and Khwe Art Project; Ekoka Art Group

Contemporary San art, also known as contemporary Bushman art, is an artistic movement that emerged in Botswana in the early 1990s. The first contemporary San art workshop was the Kuru Art Project, created in 1990 as part of the activities of the Kuru Development Trust, a local NGO providing development aid to the San people of the Ghanzi district.

The paintings and engravings created through the Kuru Art Project quickly gained recognition in Southern Africa, and later in Europe, from 1993 onward. Several artists have received prestigious awards. In 1991, Dada Coexʼae Qgam and Thamae Setshogo were honored at the Artists in Botswana competition. More recently, in 2011, 2013, 2014, and 2017, artist Thamae Kaashe won first prize in the printmaking category at the National Arts Competition in Botswana, as well as the Best Artist of the Year award in 2013.

The success of this initiative led to the creation of similar projects in South Africa and Namibia. In 1993, the !Xun and Khwe Art Project was established in Schmidtsdrift, Northern Cape, South Africa. In 1999, the South African San Institute organized art workshops in Welkom, Northern Cape, with a group of ≠Khomani artists. Between 2002 and 2007, the Ekoka Art Group emerged in the Ohangwena region of Namibia, working with Ju/’hoansi and !Kung artists. However, these last two initiatives were never institutionalized as permanent art centers.

Several researchers have examined the relationship between this contemporary art and the region's rock engravings and paintings, which are generally attributed to the San. Studies have shown that there is no direct link between present-day creations and ancient rock art. However, a multifaceted dialogue has emerged between these two artistic forms due to their coexistence in the contemporary landscape.
