= San rock art =

Art of the San people of Southern Africa

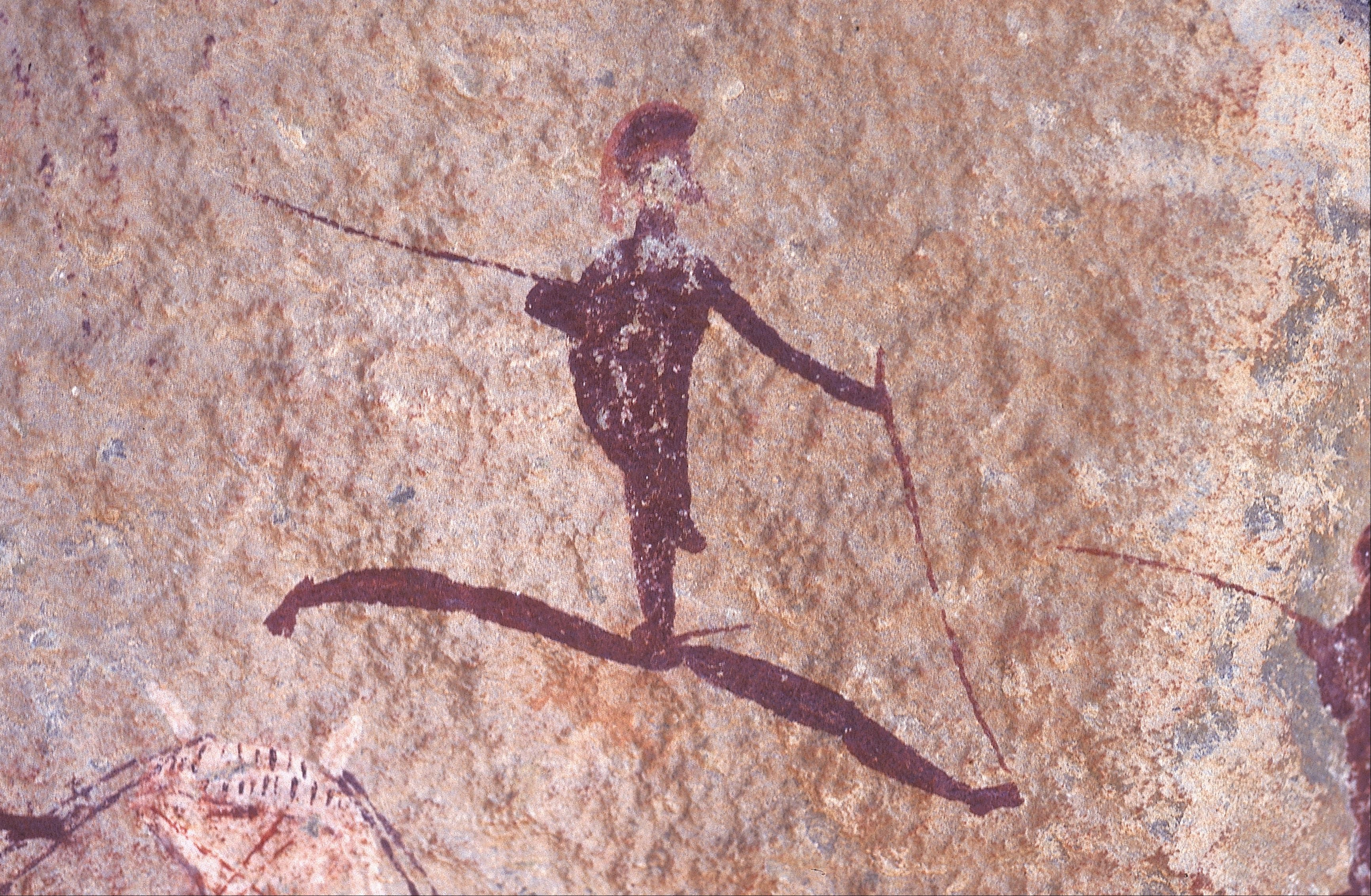
Detail of a San rock painting in the Drakensberg

The San, or Bushmen, are indigenous people in Southern Africa particularly in what is now South Africa and Botswana. Their ancient rock paintings and carvings (collectively called rock art) are found in caves and on rock shelters, commonly produced using different pigments and production processes. Some of these paintings can be found additionally in different museums, as well as seen in different modern digitization. The artwork depicts non-human beings, hunters, and half-human half-animal hybrids. The half-human hybrids are believed to be medicine men or healers involved in a healing dance.

Sandy Gall writes, "The Laurens van der Post panel at Tsodilo is one of the most famous rock paintings." High on this rock face in Botswana is the image of a "magnificent red eland bull" painted, according to Van der Post, "only as a Bushman who had a deep identification with the eland could have painted him." Also on this rock face is a female giraffe that is motionless, as if alarmed by a predator. Several other images of animals are depicted there, along with the flesh blood-red handprints that are the signature of the unknown artist. The Drakensberg and Lesotho are particularly well known for their San rock art. Tsodilo was recognised as a UNESCO World Heritage Site in 2001; not all the art covered by this is by San people or their ancestors.

== Learning from rock art ==
San used rock art to record things that happened in their lives. The rock art could be used to depict family life or used for a formal occasion, and, because of this, a lot can be learned about how the San lived through their rock art. However, large amounts of rock art have been carved out or destroyed by people, limiting what we have access to.

=== Symbols, religion, and spiritual connections ===
According to Thomas Dowson, "a lot of rock art is actually in symbols and metaphors." For example, eland bulls meant marriage, curing, or the trance dance. Additionally, San art was often religious in nature and grounded in San cosmology and subjects were not chosen indiscriminately, but rather for their significance of some kind, such as economic or social. Most experts who study San rock art recognize that the creation of rock art images was its own ritual, and that the creation of these images helped the San people connect with the spirit realm.

Dorothea Bleek, writer of the article "Beliefs and Customs of the /Xam Bushmen", published in 1933, says the San also recorded "rain dance animals". When they did rain dances they would go into a trance to "capture" one of these animals. In their trance they would kill it, and its blood and milk became the rain. As depicted in the rock art, the rain dance animals they "saw" usually resembled a hippopotamus or antelope, and were sometimes surrounded by fish according to Dowson.

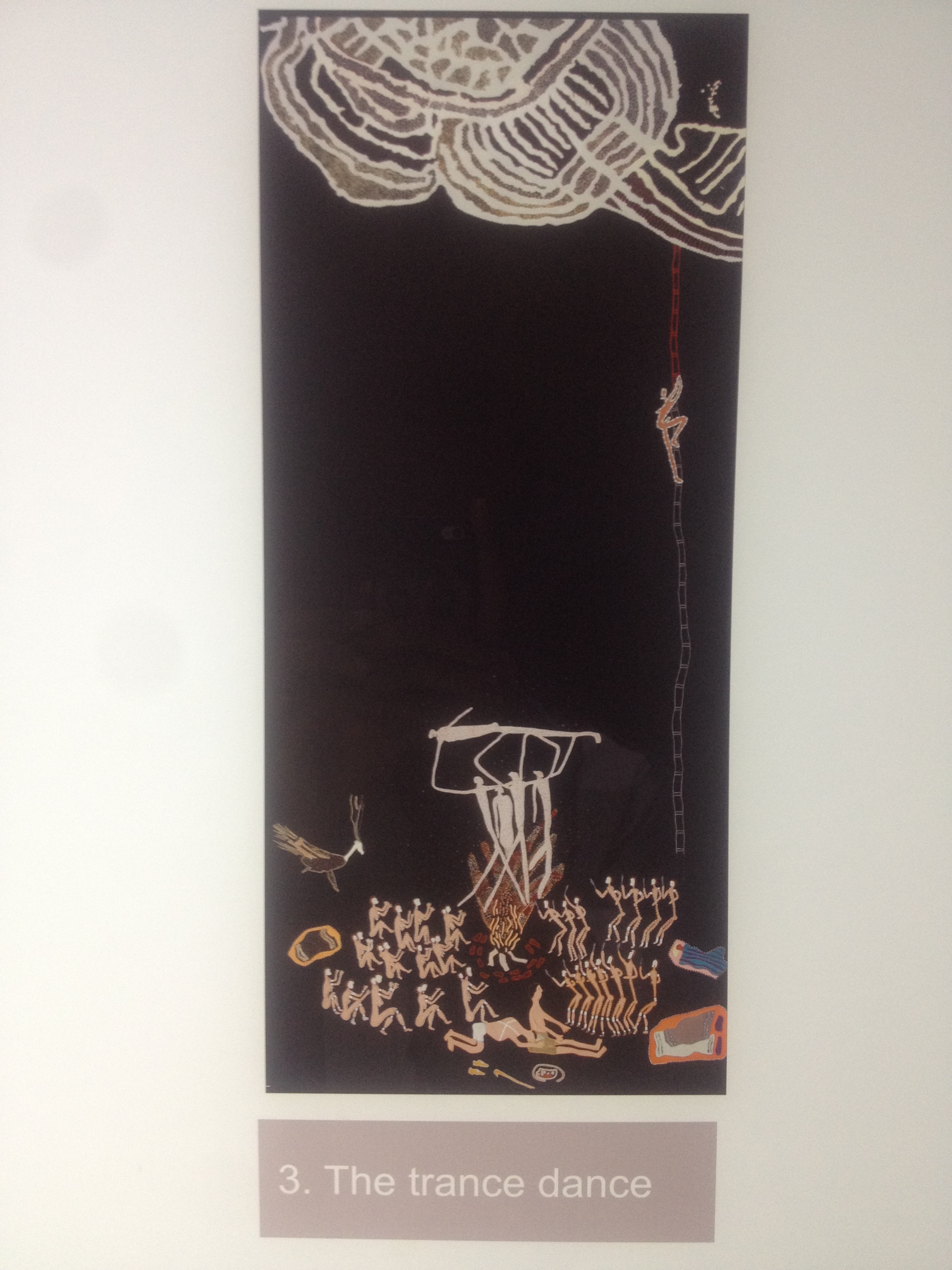
This rock art image depicts the performance of the trance dance, performed commonly by San ritual specialists when entering the trance state.

The trance state that occurs during the rain dances are also commonly present in thought and art practices for the San People. The individuals who enter this trance state are referred to as "shamans", though now this term can be seen as denoting of the spiritual practice of these individuals. So, more commonly today, these individuals are referred to as "ritual specialist" who establish connection with the spirit realm. Another common term used to describe San ritual specialist are "trance dances" as this is part of how they enter the trance state. In addition to dancing they also hyperventilate, make sounds, and experience intense concentration. Furthermore, both men and women could (and still can) be ritual specialist, and there are usually more than one ritual specialist at a given time. There are many San rock art paintings referencing the trance dance through the creation of figures with different postures as well as connections to the trance state with depictions of part human - part animal figures. With what is now known about trancing and the spirit realm, ethnographic evidence about the San people make clear connections to specific imagery depicted in rock art.

=== Daily life ===
H. C. Woodhouse, author of the book Archaeology in Southern Africa, says historical sources have also said that the San often disguised themselves as animals so they could get close enough to grazing herds to shoot them. The head of the buck was an important part of this disguise and was used in dancing and miming of the actions of animals. Looking at rock art paintings, the large number of buckheaded figures is evidence that the San did this.

=== Depictions of colonization ===
Several instances of rock art have been found that resemble wagons and colonists, illustrating contact with European settlers. Dowson notes that, "The people who brought in the wagons and so forth thus became, whether they realized it or not, part of the social production of southern African rock art"; they added a new dimension. A famous example is of a sailing ship, known as the Porterville Galleon (found 150 kilometers inland in the Skurweberg Mountains near the town of Porterville). The picture is thought to represent a Dutch ship and have been created in the mid-17th century. Later examples of colonial subject matter include women wearing European-style dresses, men with guns, and wagons and carts made during the 19th century.

== Production of rock art ==
=== Pigment and preparation ===
The San people would sometimes use different coloured stones to do rock art drawings. Woodhouse says, "They usually used red rock, which they ground until it was fine, and then mixed it with fat." They then rubbed this on the rock to form the pictures. This paint withstands the rain and weather for very long periods. In addition to this, the four pigment colors seen in San rock art are red, yellow, black, and white, and they are obtained using different methods. The Article A Multi-technique Characterization and Provenance Study of the Pigments Used In San Rock Art, South Africa mentions how different studies "show that the red paint is made with red ochre or haematite, the yellow with yellow ochre or goethite, the white with calcite, gypsum or white clay, and the black with amorphous carbon or manganese oxides".

Though not confirmed, due to crystallized layers found underneath pigmented areas of rock surfaces, it is possible that the San people used acidic liquids, like those of plant or fruit juice, to make the areas in which they were applying pigments more porous for easier paint adhesion. Other speculations include that the crystallized layers ( dissolved calcium carbonate),can occur from natural weathering over time and exposure to things like lichens, bacteria, and rain.

=== Style and application ===
According to Phillip V. Tobias, an Honorary Professor of Palaeoanthropology at the Bernard Price Institute for Palaeontological Research, the San used this paint in four styles: "monochromes, animal outlines in thick red lines, thinly outlined figures, and white stylized figures." A.R. Willcox, writer of the article "Australian and South African Rock-Art Compared", published in 1959, says the tool used to do these paintings was "a brush made from animal’s hair or a single small feather." People also used their hands and animal bones to paint. This may be one reason for the great fineness and delicacy of their painting. I. and J. Rudner, writers of the journal "Who Were the Artists? Archaeological Notes from South West Africa", published in 1959, say the form that the San use is often referred to as Dynamic School. "It has a lot of action and color, and reached its climax in the shaded eland pictures." It is usually associated with the San.

=== "Signatures" and themes ===
According to Woodhouse, clues are given as to who worked on the rock art by the subjects that are chosen. There are many pictures of the eland, reybuck, hartebeest and lion, and also of the San and fighting. However, there are few depictions of plants. Wilcox notes that, "plants usually fell in the domain of women, so it is presumed that the authors of these paintings were men."

== Digitization and conservation ==
Coat of arms symbol of South Africa

The South African Rock Art Digital Archive (SARADA) contains over 250,000 images, tracings, and historical documents of ancient African rock art. In addition to making images of the art accessible to a much wider swath of the public, the project helps protect art from the physical damage that comes from in-person visits.

The conservation of San rock art can also be seen in South Africa's national coat of arms symbol. During the post-apartheid era, in the late 1990s, the symbol was updated to include rock art at the center of its design. Created under Thabo Mbeki's African Renaissance paradigm, the symbol emphasis the idea of moving past the racially divided apartheid era.

== Representation of the San people and rock art in institutions ==
=== Iziko South African Museum ===
The Iziko South African Museum has a permanent exhibit that features San rock art, called 'The Power of Rock Art'. This exhibit remains the only one in its city that acknowledges San people and their history in South Africa. Within this exhibit, a curation was held in 2023 called The Evolution of Indigenous Art. This curation includes rock art from the San and Khoe indigenous communities. The curation's goal was to focus on the voices of indigenous people and their cultural identities, rather than the neuration of colonial settlers.

=== Iziko South African National Gallery ===
Comparatively, the exhibition Miscast: Negotiating Khoisan History and Material Culture (1996) at the Iziko South African National Gallery had a different approach for representing the San people and San rock art, focusing on colonial violence as a way of representing the history of the KhoiSan people. While the intent was to bring awareness to settler colonial violence, it instead sparked criticism in how it represented the KhoiSan people and was seen more as an act of violence against the people it was representing, specifically highlighting their oppression.

== See also ==
- San healing practices
- San religion

Paintings

- Driekops Eiland
- The White Lady

Painting sites

- Apollo 11 Cave
- Drakensberg
- Tsodilo Hills, World Heritage site in Botswana
- Twyfelfontein, World Heritage site in Namibia
- Wildebeest Kuil Rock Art Centre
