= Coexʼae Qgam =

Botswanan artist (1934–2008)

- Born: 1934; Ghanzi, Bechuanaland Protectorate
- Died: October 24, 2008 (aged 71–72); Ghanzi, Botswana
- Known for: Print making

Coexʼae (sometimes Coinxʼae or Xwexae) Qgam, who worked under the name Dada (sometimes rendered as Dada Coexʼae Qgam) (1934–2008), was a Botswana artist, storyteller, and translator. A Bushman, she was a member of the Ncoakhoe people, speakers of the Naro language.

Qgam was born in 1934 in Ghanzi and had only three months of education; nevertheless, she came to be fluent in five African languages. She worked for a time as a nanny and domestic worker. It was during her employment in Namibia that she was first exposed to textile art, when an employer taught her to do needlework and embroidery. In 1990, she joined the Kuru Art Project as a translator; exposure to different art forms encouraged her to try her hand at creating artwork herself, although she had no formal training. In 1999, she was one of eight artists, four from the Kalahari and four from New Mexico, to participate in a cultural exchange with the University of New Mexico in which they would create a suite of lithographs on the subject of tricksters in folklore. In January 2000, her work was shown in Gaborone alongside that of Ann Gollifer and Neo Matome. During her career, Qgam showed work through Southern Africa as well as in Europe, Japan, and the United States. Her work is represented in the collection of the Lechwe Trust in Zambia and the Portland Museum of Art. Three of her lithographs are owned by the city of Albuquerque, New Mexico. Late in life, Qgam took in fellow San artist Cgʼose Ntcoxʼo after the latter was widowed.

Qgam collaborated with a group of other San artists from the Kuru Art Project on the publication of Qauqaua, an artists' book published in Johannesburg in 1996; the text of the book is based on her retelling of a San folktale. She was herself the subject of a book as well, A Biography and Portrait, Conversations and Images: Coexʼae Qgam, Dada "I Am One of a Kind. I Don't Know why I was Created": Story Teller, Dancer, Beadworker, Painter, Printmaker, Daughter, Sister, Mother, Lover, Wife by Ann Gollifer and Jenny Egner, published in 2011 and consisting of interviews and a catalogue of her work.

Qgam died in Ghanzi on October 24, 2008.
