= Kaross =

South African cloak

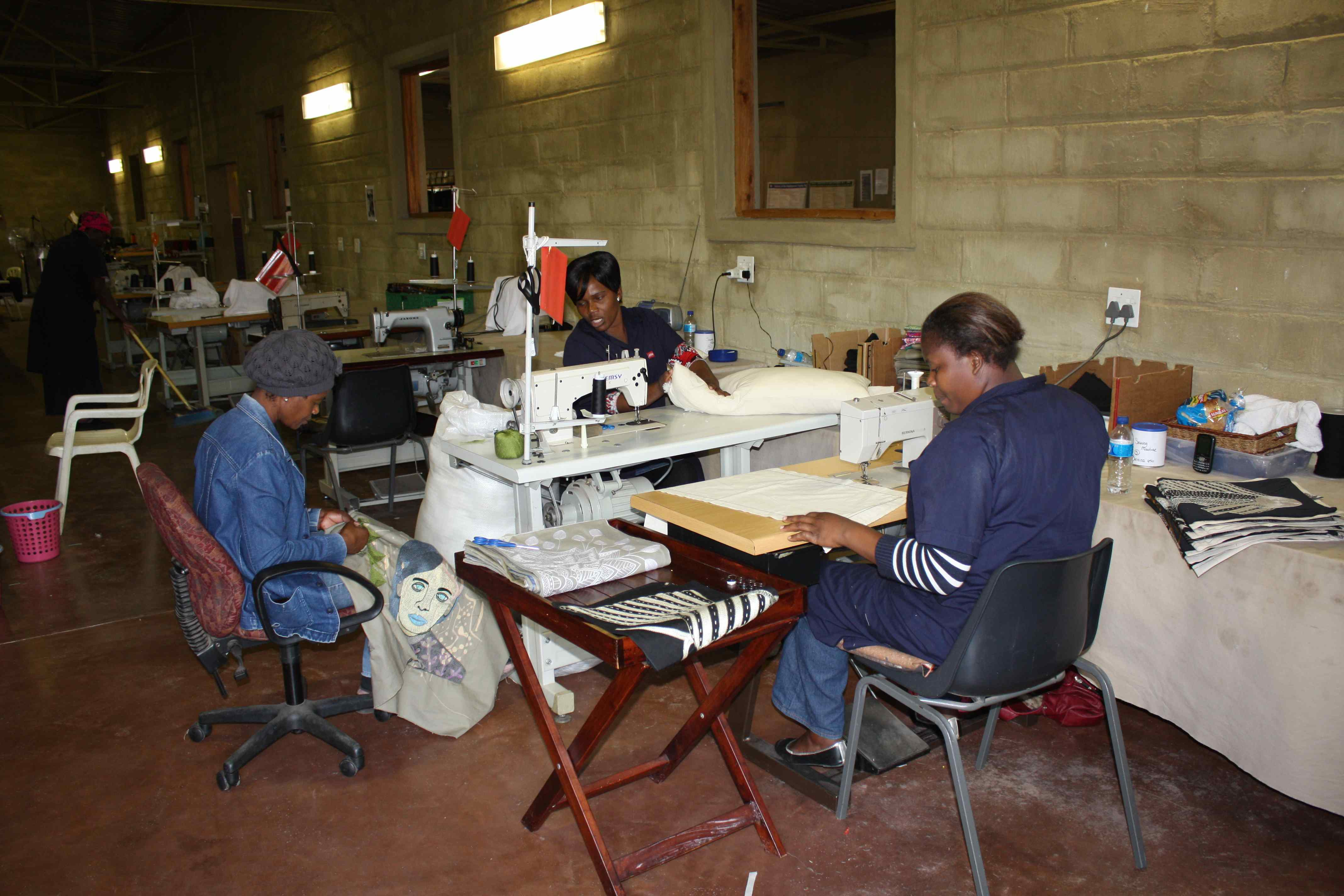
Kaross embroiderers at work, kaross factory in Limpopo

A kaross is a cloak made of sheepskin, or the hide of other animals, with the hair left on. It is properly confined to the coat of skin without sleeves and used to be worn by the Khoikhoi and Bushmen / San peoples of South Africa. These karosses became replaced by a blanket. Their chiefs wore karosses of the skin of the wild cat, leopard or caracal. The word is also loosely applied to the cloaks of leopard-skin worn by the chiefs and principal men of several southern African tribes.

Kaross is probably either a genuine Khoikhoi word, or else an adaptation of the Dutch kuras (Portuguese: couraça), a cuirass. In a vocabulary dated 1673 "karos" is described as a "corrupt Dutch word."

These days the kaross is a common tourist item, being made of various animal hides including cowhide. The term is loosely applied in modern times to fur blankets sold as bedding. These "karosses" often have panels of different types of animal fur sewn into them in order to make a decorative pattern.

== Gallery ==
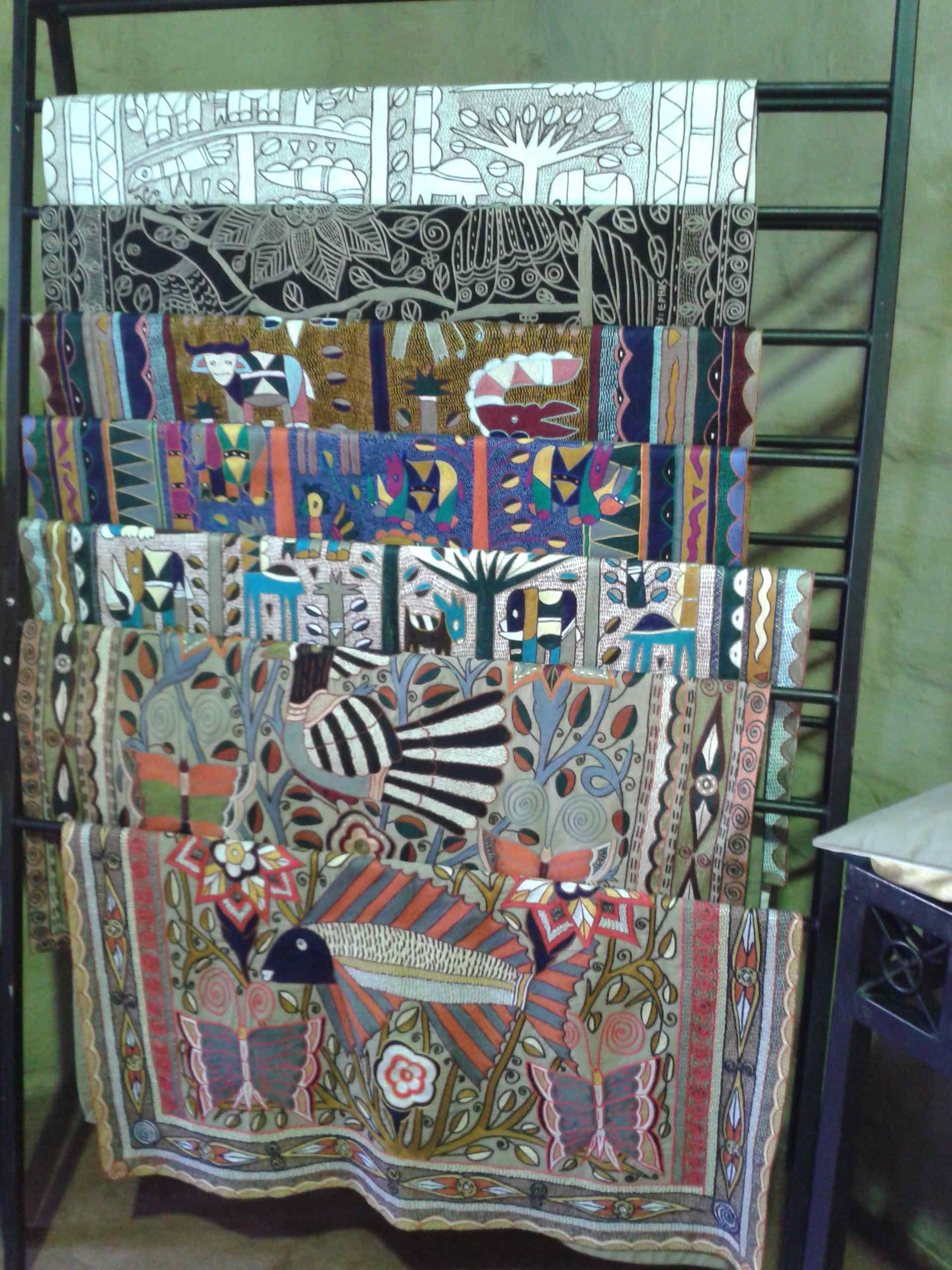
Textiles on display, kaross factory, Limpopo

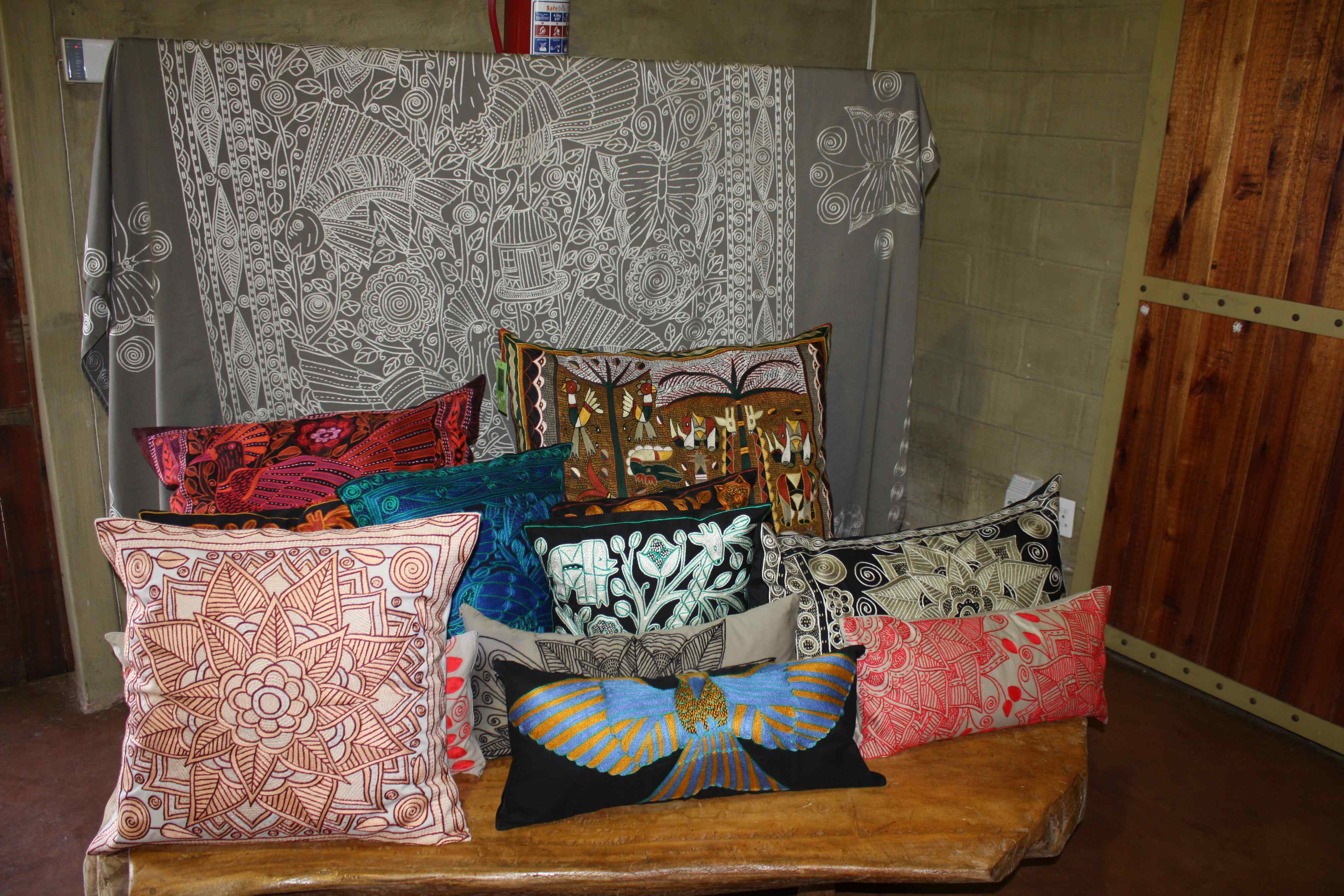
Kaross textile products on display, kaross factory, Limpopo

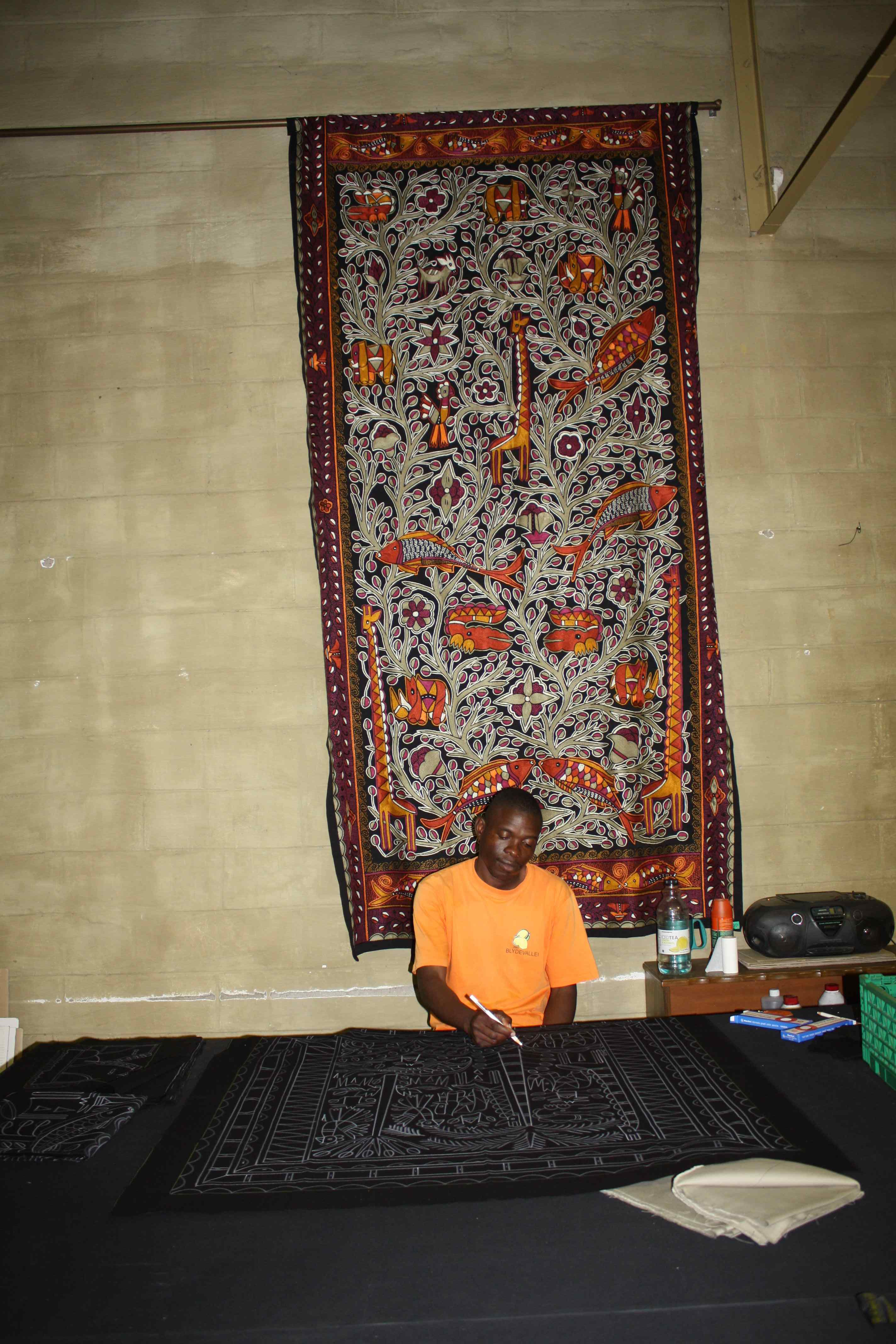
Kaross artist, Solomon Mohati, kaross factory, Limpopo
