= Cgʼose Ntcoxʼo =

Motswana artist (1950 – 2013)

- Born: 1950; Ghanzi District, Botswana
- Died: 2013 (aged 62–63)
- Occupation: Artist
- Known for: ethnic livery scheme

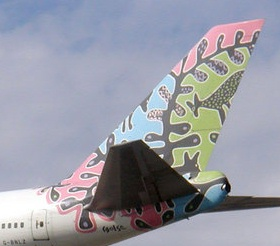
British Airways ethnic livery based on a design by Cgʼose Ntcoxʼo

Cgʼose Ntcoxʼo (sometimes Xhose Noxo), known as Cgoise (c. 1950 – 2013) was an artist from Botswana.

Ntcoxʼo was a member of the Ncoakhoe people, speakers of the Naro language, and was born around 1950 in the Ghanzi District of Botswana. She was a member of the Kuru Art Project. In the early 1990s some of her work was shown in a gallery in London and seen by representatives of British Airways, who decided to purchase one of her pieces and to use it as the basis for a design in their ethnic livery scheme. A representative for the airline traveled to Africa to see her; in her telling, she was handed "a piece of paper and told...to make a cross". Despite the fact that she was illiterate, this transaction was held to be binding and to have caused her to transfer the rights to her work. She received 12,000 pula for her work. At the time her husband was ill with tuberculosis and her daughter was unemployed, and she was responsible for supporting a large family.

During her career she collaborated with a group of other San artists from the Kuru Art Project on the publication of Qauqaua, an artists' book published in Johannesburg in 1996. In 1999 she was one of eight artists, four from the Kalahari and four from New Mexico, to participate in a cultural exchange with the University of New Mexico in which they would create a suite of lithographs upon the subject of tricksters in folklore. She is represented in the collections of the Portland Museum of Art and the city of Albuquerque, New Mexico, which displays her lithograph Jujubu and Nxam Veldfood in its City and County Government Building. In 2004 her work appeared on a postage stamp issued by Botswana, one of a set of four depicting works by contemporary artists; others represented in the set included Nxaedom Qhomatca and Qgoma Ncokgʼo.

Late in life Ntcoxʼo was taken in by fellow artist Coexʼae Qgam, with whom she lived until the latter's death. Ntcoxʼo herself died of a stroke in 2013, leaving almost no estate.
