= List of minor planets: 557001–558000 =

The following is a partial list of minor planets, running from minor-planet number 557001 through 558000, inclusive. The primary data for this and other partial lists is based on JPL's "Small-Body Orbital Elements" and data available from the Minor Planet Center. Critical list information is also provided by the MPC, unless otherwise specified from Lowell Observatory. A detailed description of the table's columns and additional sources are given on the main page including a complete list of every page in this series, and a statistical break-up on the dynamical classification of minor planets.

Also see the summary list of all named bodies in numerical and alphabetical order, and the corresponding naming citations for the number range of this particular list. New namings may only be added to this list after official publication, as the preannouncement of names is condemned by the Working Group for Small Bodies Nomenclature of the International Astronomical Union.

Near-Earth obj.	MBA (inner)	MBA (outer)	Centaur
Mars-crosser	MBA (middle)	Jupiter trojan	Trans-Neptunian obj.
Unclassified

== 557001–557100 ==
Designation			Discovery			Properties		Ref
Permanent	Provisional	Named after	Date	Site	Discoverer(s)	Category	Diam.	Ref
557001	2014 SZ_{247}	—	November 17, 2006	Kitt Peak	Spacewatch	·	1.9 km	MPC · JPL
557002	2014 SG_{248}	—	March 22, 2012	Palomar	Palomar Transient Factory	·	2.3 km	MPC · JPL
557003	2014 SN_{252}	—	September 23, 2009	Kitt Peak	Spacewatch	·	2.0 km	MPC · JPL
557004	2014 SW_{252}	—	September 2, 2014	Haleakala	Pan-STARRS 1	EUN	900 m	MPC · JPL
557005	2014 SJ_{253}	—	February 5, 2011	Haleakala	Pan-STARRS 1	·	1.6 km	MPC · JPL
557006	2014 SD_{256}	—	October 1, 2005	Mount Lemmon	Mount Lemmon Survey	·	1.5 km	MPC · JPL
557007	2014 SU_{257}	—	October 28, 2001	Palomar	NEAT	JUN	840 m	MPC · JPL
557008	2014 SZ_{257}	—	August 25, 2014	Haleakala	Pan-STARRS 1	·	1.8 km	MPC · JPL
557009	2014 SD_{261}	—	September 18, 2009	Kitt Peak	Spacewatch	H	390 m	MPC · JPL
557010	2014 SK_{262}	—	September 14, 2014	Haleakala	Pan-STARRS 1	H	480 m	MPC · JPL
557011	2014 SR_{263}	—	August 6, 2014	Haleakala	Pan-STARRS 1	(1547)	1.5 km	MPC · JPL
557012	2014 SO_{264}	—	November 5, 2010	Kitt Peak	Spacewatch	·	1.2 km	MPC · JPL
557013	2014 SO_{266}	—	September 25, 2006	Catalina	CSS	·	1.2 km	MPC · JPL
557014	2014 SZ_{270}	—	May 15, 2013	Haleakala	Pan-STARRS 1	EUN	980 m	MPC · JPL
557015	2014 SS_{271}	—	April 7, 2013	Kitt Peak	Spacewatch	·	1.2 km	MPC · JPL
557016	2014 SP_{276}	—	August 30, 2014	Kitt Peak	Spacewatch	EUN	850 m	MPC · JPL
557017	2014 SS_{278}	—	August 31, 2005	Kitt Peak	Spacewatch	·	1.5 km	MPC · JPL
557018	2014 SH_{281}	—	February 1, 2006	Kitt Peak	Spacewatch	·	2.0 km	MPC · JPL
557019	2014 SL_{281}	—	March 25, 2009	Sandlot	G. Hug	·	1.3 km	MPC · JPL
557020	2014 SG_{282}	—	October 14, 2010	Mount Lemmon	Mount Lemmon Survey	·	1.3 km	MPC · JPL
557021	2014 SX_{282}	—	May 17, 2012	Mount Lemmon	Mount Lemmon Survey	·	1.8 km	MPC · JPL
557022	2014 SD_{283}	—	October 18, 2010	Kitt Peak	Spacewatch	EUN	880 m	MPC · JPL
557023	2014 SQ_{283}	—	January 19, 2012	Haleakala	Pan-STARRS 1	HNS	1.1 km	MPC · JPL
557024	2014 SG_{284}	—	October 30, 2006	Mount Lemmon	Mount Lemmon Survey	HNS	1.5 km	MPC · JPL
557025	2014 SJ_{285}	—	March 11, 2008	Kitt Peak	Spacewatch	·	2.0 km	MPC · JPL
557026	2014 SV_{287}	—	April 21, 2009	Kitt Peak	Spacewatch	(5)	1.4 km	MPC · JPL
557027	2014 SQ_{288}	—	September 14, 2014	Catalina	CSS	·	1.2 km	MPC · JPL
557028	2014 SC_{289}	—	November 25, 2006	Mount Lemmon	Mount Lemmon Survey	·	1.9 km	MPC · JPL
557029	2014 ST_{289}	—	February 10, 2008	Kitt Peak	Spacewatch	·	1.4 km	MPC · JPL
557030	2014 SQ_{292}	—	December 14, 2006	Mount Lemmon	Mount Lemmon Survey	·	1.1 km	MPC · JPL
557031	2014 SF_{294}	—	June 30, 2014	Haleakala	Pan-STARRS 1	EUN	870 m	MPC · JPL
557032	2014 SJ_{295}	—	November 24, 2002	Palomar	NEAT	·	1.6 km	MPC · JPL
557033	2014 SZ_{298}	—	September 15, 2009	Kitt Peak	Spacewatch	·	1.6 km	MPC · JPL
557034	2014 SA_{299}	—	September 25, 2014	Kitt Peak	Spacewatch	·	2.0 km	MPC · JPL
557035	2014 SS_{299}	—	September 25, 2014	Kitt Peak	Spacewatch	·	1.5 km	MPC · JPL
557036	2014 SX_{299}	—	August 31, 2005	Kitt Peak	Spacewatch	·	1.5 km	MPC · JPL
557037	2014 SL_{305}	—	December 13, 2006	Kitt Peak	Spacewatch	·	1.3 km	MPC · JPL
557038	2014 SD_{306}	—	August 30, 2005	Kitt Peak	Spacewatch	·	1.3 km	MPC · JPL
557039	2014 SJ_{306}	—	September 30, 2010	Mount Lemmon	Mount Lemmon Survey	·	1.3 km	MPC · JPL
557040	2014 SE_{307}	—	November 30, 2010	Mount Lemmon	Mount Lemmon Survey	·	1.7 km	MPC · JPL
557041	2014 SA_{308}	—	September 15, 2009	Bisei	BATTeRS	·	1.9 km	MPC · JPL
557042	2014 SN_{309}	—	September 24, 2014	Mount Lemmon	Mount Lemmon Survey	·	1.3 km	MPC · JPL
557043	2014 SW_{310}	—	September 2, 2014	Haleakala	Pan-STARRS 1	·	1.8 km	MPC · JPL
557044	2014 SL_{311}	—	March 27, 2008	Mount Lemmon	Mount Lemmon Survey	·	1.8 km	MPC · JPL
557045 Nadolschi	2014 SQ_{314}	Nadolschi	March 13, 2008	La Silla	EURONEAR, -	(5)	1.5 km	MPC · JPL
557046	2014 SG_{315}	—	August 31, 2005	Kitt Peak	Spacewatch	·	1.2 km	MPC · JPL
557047	2014 SO_{315}	—	October 8, 2005	Kitt Peak	Spacewatch	·	1.3 km	MPC · JPL
557048	2014 SQ_{315}	—	September 26, 2014	Kitt Peak	Spacewatch	·	1.2 km	MPC · JPL
557049	2014 SD_{316}	—	October 26, 2005	Kitt Peak	Spacewatch	·	1.6 km	MPC · JPL
557050	2014 SG_{316}	—	November 6, 2010	Mount Lemmon	Mount Lemmon Survey	·	1.2 km	MPC · JPL
557051	2014 SV_{316}	—	February 27, 2012	Haleakala	Pan-STARRS 1	·	1.2 km	MPC · JPL
557052	2014 SY_{316}	—	April 13, 2013	Haleakala	Pan-STARRS 1	·	1.1 km	MPC · JPL
557053	2014 SA_{318}	—	September 15, 2006	Kitt Peak	Spacewatch	·	1.2 km	MPC · JPL
557054	2014 SN_{318}	—	November 1, 2005	Kitt Peak	Spacewatch	·	1.5 km	MPC · JPL
557055	2014 SV_{318}	—	February 23, 2007	Mount Lemmon	Mount Lemmon Survey	·	1.3 km	MPC · JPL
557056	2014 SW_{319}	—	November 14, 2010	Kitt Peak	Spacewatch	·	1.1 km	MPC · JPL
557057	2014 SN_{320}	—	November 10, 2010	Mount Lemmon	Mount Lemmon Survey	·	1.0 km	MPC · JPL
557058	2014 SX_{320}	—	September 23, 2014	Mount Lemmon	Mount Lemmon Survey	·	1.2 km	MPC · JPL
557059	2014 SE_{322}	—	December 10, 2010	Mount Lemmon	Mount Lemmon Survey	·	1.6 km	MPC · JPL
557060	2014 SF_{322}	—	October 15, 2001	Kitt Peak	Spacewatch	EUN	1.1 km	MPC · JPL
557061	2014 SS_{323}	—	March 23, 2003	Apache Point	SDSS Collaboration	·	2.0 km	MPC · JPL
557062	2014 SB_{325}	—	August 24, 2001	Kitt Peak	Spacewatch	·	1.0 km	MPC · JPL
557063	2014 SH_{326}	—	December 13, 2010	Mount Lemmon	Mount Lemmon Survey	·	1.6 km	MPC · JPL
557064	2014 SL_{327}	—	January 17, 2007	Kitt Peak	Spacewatch	MIS	2.5 km	MPC · JPL
557065	2014 SR_{327}	—	April 5, 2008	Mount Lemmon	Mount Lemmon Survey	H	320 m	MPC · JPL
557066	2014 SU_{327}	—	December 17, 2001	Socorro	LINEAR	·	1.3 km	MPC · JPL
557067	2014 SJ_{329}	—	October 28, 2005	Campo Imperatore	CINEOS	·	1.9 km	MPC · JPL
557068	2014 SM_{330}	—	September 29, 2014	Kitt Peak	Spacewatch	·	1.3 km	MPC · JPL
557069	2014 SB_{332}	—	August 28, 2014	Haleakala	Pan-STARRS 1	·	1.4 km	MPC · JPL
557070	2014 SP_{332}	—	September 14, 2014	Mount Lemmon	Mount Lemmon Survey	·	1.5 km	MPC · JPL
557071	2014 SY_{333}	—	September 3, 2010	Mount Lemmon	Mount Lemmon Survey	EUN	1.1 km	MPC · JPL
557072	2014 SS_{334}	—	September 27, 2005	Kitt Peak	Spacewatch	NEM	2.2 km	MPC · JPL
557073	2014 SO_{336}	—	May 8, 2013	Haleakala	Pan-STARRS 1	·	1.2 km	MPC · JPL
557074	2014 SV_{337}	—	September 30, 2014	Kitt Peak	Spacewatch	·	1.6 km	MPC · JPL
557075	2014 SC_{338}	—	September 2, 2014	Haleakala	Pan-STARRS 1	·	1.2 km	MPC · JPL
557076	2014 SS_{338}	—	February 17, 2007	Kitt Peak	Spacewatch	·	1.3 km	MPC · JPL
557077	2014 SR_{343}	—	September 19, 2014	Haleakala	Pan-STARRS 1	·	1.6 km	MPC · JPL
557078	2014 SN_{344}	—	April 28, 2004	Kitt Peak	Spacewatch	·	1.8 km	MPC · JPL
557079	2014 SE_{346}	—	September 7, 2004	Kitt Peak	Spacewatch	·	2.2 km	MPC · JPL
557080	2014 SN_{347}	—	September 30, 2014	Kitt Peak	Spacewatch	·	1.8 km	MPC · JPL
557081	2014 SU_{347}	—	October 2, 2006	Mount Lemmon	Mount Lemmon Survey	·	800 m	MPC · JPL
557082	2014 SO_{349}	—	December 8, 2015	Haleakala	Pan-STARRS 1	L5	6.5 km	MPC · JPL
557083	2014 SW_{350}	—	September 20, 2014	Haleakala	Pan-STARRS 1	H	370 m	MPC · JPL
557084	2014 SZ_{350}	—	April 13, 2013	Kitt Peak	Spacewatch	H	430 m	MPC · JPL
557085	2014 SF_{353}	—	April 29, 2008	Mount Lemmon	Mount Lemmon Survey	·	2.2 km	MPC · JPL
557086	2014 SK_{353}	—	January 30, 2008	Kitt Peak	Spacewatch	·	1.1 km	MPC · JPL
557087	2014 SM_{353}	—	August 30, 2005	Kitt Peak	Spacewatch	(17392)	1.3 km	MPC · JPL
557088	2014 SN_{353}	—	October 27, 2005	Mount Lemmon	Mount Lemmon Survey	AGN	850 m	MPC · JPL
557089	2014 SO_{353}	—	September 19, 2014	Haleakala	Pan-STARRS 1	·	1.5 km	MPC · JPL
557090	2014 SQ_{353}	—	January 10, 2007	Mount Lemmon	Mount Lemmon Survey	·	1.5 km	MPC · JPL
557091	2014 SA_{354}	—	September 20, 2014	Haleakala	Pan-STARRS 1	·	1.3 km	MPC · JPL
557092	2014 SS_{354}	—	January 17, 2007	Kitt Peak	Spacewatch	GEF	1.1 km	MPC · JPL
557093	2014 SO_{355}	—	August 24, 2001	Kitt Peak	Spacewatch	·	920 m	MPC · JPL
557094	2014 SW_{355}	—	December 15, 2006	Kitt Peak	Spacewatch	·	2.1 km	MPC · JPL
557095	2014 SX_{356}	—	September 16, 2014	Haleakala	Pan-STARRS 1	·	1.3 km	MPC · JPL
557096	2014 SF_{357}	—	September 18, 2014	Haleakala	Pan-STARRS 1	·	1.3 km	MPC · JPL
557097	2014 SP_{357}	—	November 1, 2005	Mount Lemmon	Mount Lemmon Survey	·	2.2 km	MPC · JPL
557098	2014 SL_{358}	—	September 19, 2014	Haleakala	Pan-STARRS 1	·	1.2 km	MPC · JPL
557099	2014 SB_{359}	—	October 25, 2005	Mount Lemmon	Mount Lemmon Survey	·	1.4 km	MPC · JPL
557100	2014 SH_{359}	—	September 19, 2014	Haleakala	Pan-STARRS 1	·	1.2 km	MPC · JPL

== 557101–557200 ==
back to top

Designation			Discovery			Properties		Ref
Permanent	Provisional	Named after	Date	Site	Discoverer(s)	Category	Diam.	Ref
557101	2014 SL_{359}	—	October 18, 2006	Kitt Peak	Spacewatch	·	900 m	MPC · JPL
557102	2014 SR_{359}	—	November 8, 2010	Mount Lemmon	Mount Lemmon Survey	·	1.3 km	MPC · JPL
557103	2014 SG_{360}	—	August 27, 2014	Haleakala	Pan-STARRS 1	HNS	870 m	MPC · JPL
557104	2014 SH_{360}	—	February 28, 2008	Kitt Peak	Spacewatch	·	1.1 km	MPC · JPL
557105	2014 SN_{362}	—	September 30, 2009	Mount Lemmon	Mount Lemmon Survey	·	2.4 km	MPC · JPL
557106	2014 SK_{363}	—	September 30, 2014	Mount Lemmon	Mount Lemmon Survey	·	1.2 km	MPC · JPL
557107	2014 SR_{364}	—	September 20, 2014	Haleakala	Pan-STARRS 1	·	2.0 km	MPC · JPL
557108	2014 SK_{365}	—	April 12, 2004	Bergisch Gladbach	W. Bickel	·	1.3 km	MPC · JPL
557109	2014 SN_{365}	—	September 25, 2014	Mount Lemmon	Mount Lemmon Survey	EUN	1.2 km	MPC · JPL
557110	2014 SC_{366}	—	December 20, 2001	Palomar	NEAT	·	1.6 km	MPC · JPL
557111	2014 SE_{378}	—	September 22, 2014	Haleakala	Pan-STARRS 1	L5	10 km	MPC · JPL
557112	2014 SJ_{382}	—	October 14, 2010	Mount Lemmon	Mount Lemmon Survey	(5)	870 m	MPC · JPL
557113	2014 SL_{389}	—	September 29, 2014	Haleakala	Pan-STARRS 1	·	2.2 km	MPC · JPL
557114	2014 TP_{1}	—	November 3, 2005	Mount Lemmon	Mount Lemmon Survey	HOF	2.4 km	MPC · JPL
557115	2014 TQ_{3}	—	October 14, 2001	Socorro	LINEAR	·	1.8 km	MPC · JPL
557116	2014 TO_{4}	—	September 20, 2003	Socorro	LINEAR	·	2.2 km	MPC · JPL
557117	2014 TT_{4}	—	October 1, 2014	Catalina	CSS	·	1.2 km	MPC · JPL
557118	2014 TD_{6}	—	October 22, 2005	Kitt Peak	Spacewatch	·	1.6 km	MPC · JPL
557119	2014 TM_{6}	—	November 14, 1996	Kitt Peak	Spacewatch	·	1.5 km	MPC · JPL
557120	2014 TR_{9}	—	September 13, 2005	Kitt Peak	Spacewatch	·	1.9 km	MPC · JPL
557121	2014 TV_{10}	—	April 6, 2008	Kitt Peak	Spacewatch	H	340 m	MPC · JPL
557122	2014 TA_{11}	—	December 27, 2011	Mount Lemmon	Mount Lemmon Survey	·	660 m	MPC · JPL
557123	2014 TY_{11}	—	February 27, 2012	Haleakala	Pan-STARRS 1	·	1.4 km	MPC · JPL
557124	2014 TL_{13}	—	January 27, 2007	Kitt Peak	Spacewatch	·	1.7 km	MPC · JPL
557125	2014 TG_{16}	—	October 2, 2014	Kitt Peak	Spacewatch	·	1.3 km	MPC · JPL
557126	2014 TT_{16}	—	February 10, 2008	Mount Lemmon	Mount Lemmon Survey	H	400 m	MPC · JPL
557127	2014 TY_{16}	—	December 18, 2001	Apache Point	SDSS	H	580 m	MPC · JPL
557128	2014 TT_{18}	—	September 19, 2014	Haleakala	Pan-STARRS 1	(17392)	1.3 km	MPC · JPL
557129	2014 TZ_{18}	—	September 30, 2005	Mount Lemmon	Mount Lemmon Survey	·	1.5 km	MPC · JPL
557130	2014 TJ_{19}	—	September 24, 2005	Kitt Peak	Spacewatch	·	1.5 km	MPC · JPL
557131	2014 TP_{19}	—	October 30, 2010	Mount Lemmon	Mount Lemmon Survey	·	2.5 km	MPC · JPL
557132	2014 TA_{20}	—	September 23, 2014	Mount Lemmon	Mount Lemmon Survey	HOF	2.2 km	MPC · JPL
557133	2014 TQ_{20}	—	October 1, 2005	Mount Lemmon	Mount Lemmon Survey	·	1.5 km	MPC · JPL
557134	2014 TT_{21}	—	July 18, 2001	Kitt Peak	Spacewatch	·	1.4 km	MPC · JPL
557135	2014 TW_{21}	—	February 9, 2008	Mount Lemmon	Mount Lemmon Survey	·	1.1 km	MPC · JPL
557136	2014 TG_{23}	—	April 13, 2012	Haleakala	Pan-STARRS 1	·	2.1 km	MPC · JPL
557137	2014 TE_{24}	—	September 19, 2014	Haleakala	Pan-STARRS 1	·	1.6 km	MPC · JPL
557138	2014 TK_{24}	—	September 22, 2009	Kitt Peak	Spacewatch	·	1.6 km	MPC · JPL
557139	2014 TT_{24}	—	October 2, 2014	Mount Lemmon	Mount Lemmon Survey	·	840 m	MPC · JPL
557140	2014 TZ_{25}	—	November 2, 2010	Mount Lemmon	Mount Lemmon Survey	·	1.5 km	MPC · JPL
557141	2014 TD_{26}	—	September 7, 2014	Haleakala	Pan-STARRS 1	H	590 m	MPC · JPL
557142	2014 TO_{26}	—	September 24, 2014	Kitt Peak	Spacewatch	·	1.8 km	MPC · JPL
557143	2014 TJ_{28}	—	December 3, 2010	Mount Lemmon	Mount Lemmon Survey	·	1.4 km	MPC · JPL
557144	2014 TC_{29}	—	October 2, 2014	Haleakala	Pan-STARRS 1	·	1.6 km	MPC · JPL
557145	2014 TH_{29}	—	October 2, 2014	Haleakala	Pan-STARRS 1	·	1.2 km	MPC · JPL
557146	2014 TR_{29}	—	August 30, 2005	Kitt Peak	Spacewatch	·	1.3 km	MPC · JPL
557147	2014 TT_{29}	—	March 23, 2012	Mount Lemmon	Mount Lemmon Survey	·	1.2 km	MPC · JPL
557148	2014 TT_{30}	—	February 7, 2008	Mount Lemmon	Mount Lemmon Survey	·	1.2 km	MPC · JPL
557149	2014 TB_{31}	—	December 1, 2005	Mount Lemmon	Mount Lemmon Survey	·	1.6 km	MPC · JPL
557150	2014 TO_{31}	—	February 7, 2003	La Silla	Barbieri, C.	·	1.3 km	MPC · JPL
557151	2014 TF_{32}	—	September 25, 2006	Kitt Peak	Spacewatch	·	1.2 km	MPC · JPL
557152	2014 TS_{34}	—	October 5, 2004	Kitt Peak	Spacewatch	H	310 m	MPC · JPL
557153	2014 TP_{36}	—	April 10, 2013	Haleakala	Pan-STARRS 1	·	1.7 km	MPC · JPL
557154	2014 TQ_{37}	—	September 3, 2014	Catalina	CSS	H	380 m	MPC · JPL
557155	2014 TE_{38}	—	August 14, 2001	Haleakala	NEAT	(5)	1.3 km	MPC · JPL
557156	2014 TB_{40}	—	October 12, 2014	Mount Lemmon	Mount Lemmon Survey	EUN	980 m	MPC · JPL
557157	2014 TO_{40}	—	December 14, 2001	Socorro	LINEAR	·	1.4 km	MPC · JPL
557158	2014 TZ_{40}	—	October 17, 2010	Mount Lemmon	Mount Lemmon Survey	·	1.3 km	MPC · JPL
557159	2014 TJ_{41}	—	October 9, 2005	Kitt Peak	Spacewatch	WIT	880 m	MPC · JPL
557160	2014 TL_{41}	—	April 12, 2008	Kitt Peak	Spacewatch	·	2.3 km	MPC · JPL
557161	2014 TX_{41}	—	October 13, 2014	Kitt Peak	Spacewatch	·	610 m	MPC · JPL
557162	2014 TZ_{41}	—	November 15, 2010	Kitt Peak	Spacewatch	·	1.1 km	MPC · JPL
557163	2014 TX_{43}	—	October 13, 2014	Mount Lemmon	Mount Lemmon Survey	ADE	1.4 km	MPC · JPL
557164	2014 TG_{44}	—	June 16, 2001	Kitt Peak	Spacewatch	·	1.3 km	MPC · JPL
557165	2014 TT_{44}	—	September 23, 2014	Kitt Peak	Spacewatch	L5	10 km	MPC · JPL
557166	2014 TF_{47}	—	October 1, 2000	Socorro	LINEAR	·	1.7 km	MPC · JPL
557167	2014 TN_{47}	—	October 6, 2005	Kitt Peak	Spacewatch	MRX	1.1 km	MPC · JPL
557168	2014 TC_{48}	—	September 12, 2001	Socorro	LINEAR	·	1.2 km	MPC · JPL
557169	2014 TO_{48}	—	November 8, 2010	Kitt Peak	Spacewatch	(5)	1.3 km	MPC · JPL
557170	2014 TF_{50}	—	October 11, 2001	Kitt Peak	Spacewatch	H	370 m	MPC · JPL
557171	2014 TQ_{50}	—	February 27, 2008	Kitt Peak	Spacewatch	·	1.8 km	MPC · JPL
557172	2014 TU_{50}	—	September 19, 2014	Haleakala	Pan-STARRS 1	·	1.4 km	MPC · JPL
557173	2014 TC_{52}	—	May 5, 2000	Apache Point	SDSS	RAF	1.2 km	MPC · JPL
557174	2014 TP_{52}	—	October 30, 2005	Kitt Peak	Spacewatch	·	1.6 km	MPC · JPL
557175	2014 TL_{53}	—	September 14, 2014	Kitt Peak	Spacewatch	HNS	960 m	MPC · JPL
557176	2014 TP_{53}	—	September 18, 2003	Palomar	NEAT	·	940 m	MPC · JPL
557177	2014 TZ_{53}	—	November 3, 2010	Kitt Peak	Spacewatch	·	1.4 km	MPC · JPL
557178	2014 TH_{54}	—	August 31, 2005	Palomar	NEAT	·	2.0 km	MPC · JPL
557179	2014 TZ_{54}	—	October 9, 2005	Kitt Peak	Spacewatch	·	1.8 km	MPC · JPL
557180	2014 TH_{56}	—	October 15, 2014	Kitt Peak	Spacewatch	H	480 m	MPC · JPL
557181	2014 TD_{57}	—	August 31, 2014	Haleakala	Pan-STARRS 1	·	1.4 km	MPC · JPL
557182	2014 TG_{57}	—	April 30, 2009	Kitt Peak	Spacewatch	L5 · (17492)	8.6 km	MPC · JPL
557183	2014 TO_{58}	—	October 12, 2009	Mount Lemmon	Mount Lemmon Survey	·	2.7 km	MPC · JPL
557184	2014 TD_{59}	—	November 15, 2010	Mount Lemmon	Mount Lemmon Survey	·	1.6 km	MPC · JPL
557185	2014 TR_{59}	—	September 14, 2001	Palomar	NEAT	·	1.8 km	MPC · JPL
557186	2014 TO_{60}	—	October 13, 2014	Mount Lemmon	Mount Lemmon Survey	·	1.2 km	MPC · JPL
557187	2014 TV_{63}	—	December 6, 2005	Kitt Peak	Spacewatch	·	1.6 km	MPC · JPL
557188	2014 TB_{66}	—	September 30, 2014	Catalina	CSS	DOR	2.2 km	MPC · JPL
557189	2014 TH_{66}	—	August 30, 2005	Kitt Peak	Spacewatch	·	1.2 km	MPC · JPL
557190	2014 TL_{66}	—	October 1, 2005	Mount Lemmon	Mount Lemmon Survey	·	1.5 km	MPC · JPL
557191	2014 TQ_{66}	—	April 29, 2009	Kitt Peak	Spacewatch	L5	10 km	MPC · JPL
557192	2014 TE_{67}	—	October 6, 2005	Mount Lemmon	Mount Lemmon Survey	·	1.2 km	MPC · JPL
557193	2014 TN_{67}	—	November 4, 2005	Catalina	CSS	·	2.0 km	MPC · JPL
557194	2014 TK_{68}	—	August 31, 2005	Palomar	NEAT	·	1.5 km	MPC · JPL
557195	2014 TQ_{68}	—	October 18, 2001	Palomar	NEAT	·	1.4 km	MPC · JPL
557196	2014 TU_{69}	—	August 20, 2008	Kitt Peak	Spacewatch	EOS	1.8 km	MPC · JPL
557197	2014 TG_{70}	—	October 1, 2005	Mount Lemmon	Mount Lemmon Survey	·	1.4 km	MPC · JPL
557198	2014 TQ_{70}	—	April 18, 2007	Kitt Peak	Spacewatch	·	2.4 km	MPC · JPL
557199	2014 TR_{70}	—	December 27, 2005	Kitt Peak	Spacewatch	·	1.3 km	MPC · JPL
557200	2014 TW_{71}	—	December 10, 2009	Mount Lemmon	Mount Lemmon Survey	·	2.2 km	MPC · JPL

== 557201–557300 ==
back to top

Designation			Discovery			Properties		Ref
Permanent	Provisional	Named after	Date	Site	Discoverer(s)	Category	Diam.	Ref
557201	2014 TA_{74}	—	April 11, 2008	Kitt Peak	Spacewatch	H	410 m	MPC · JPL
557202	2014 TX_{75}	—	September 19, 2014	Haleakala	Pan-STARRS 1	L5	7.3 km	MPC · JPL
557203	2014 TH_{76}	—	March 28, 2012	Mount Lemmon	Mount Lemmon Survey	HOF	2.0 km	MPC · JPL
557204	2014 TB_{78}	—	September 19, 2014	Haleakala	Pan-STARRS 1	·	1.7 km	MPC · JPL
557205	2014 TH_{78}	—	February 16, 2004	Kitt Peak	Spacewatch	·	1.9 km	MPC · JPL
557206	2014 TP_{78}	—	December 2, 2010	Mayhill-ISON	L. Elenin	·	1.3 km	MPC · JPL
557207	2014 TW_{78}	—	September 14, 2014	Kitt Peak	Spacewatch	·	1.4 km	MPC · JPL
557208	2014 TZ_{78}	—	September 29, 2014	Haleakala	Pan-STARRS 1	·	1.4 km	MPC · JPL
557209	2014 TO_{79}	—	October 1, 2014	Haleakala	Pan-STARRS 1	·	1.7 km	MPC · JPL
557210	2014 TR_{79}	—	November 13, 2010	Kitt Peak	Spacewatch	·	1.5 km	MPC · JPL
557211	2014 TB_{80}	—	October 1, 2005	Catalina	CSS	·	2.6 km	MPC · JPL
557212	2014 TD_{80}	—	October 1, 2014	Haleakala	Pan-STARRS 1	·	1.6 km	MPC · JPL
557213	2014 TY_{80}	—	November 1, 2010	Mount Lemmon	Mount Lemmon Survey	·	820 m	MPC · JPL
557214	2014 TU_{81}	—	October 15, 2014	Kitt Peak	Spacewatch	H	350 m	MPC · JPL
557215	2014 TT_{82}	—	August 22, 2014	Haleakala	Pan-STARRS 1	·	2.2 km	MPC · JPL
557216	2014 TH_{83}	—	October 13, 2014	Mount Lemmon	Mount Lemmon Survey	·	1.4 km	MPC · JPL
557217	2014 TL_{83}	—	October 5, 2014	Kitt Peak	Spacewatch	·	1.9 km	MPC · JPL
557218	2014 TH_{84}	—	January 26, 2011	Mount Lemmon	Mount Lemmon Survey	·	2.3 km	MPC · JPL
557219	2014 TT_{86}	—	October 3, 2014	Haleakala	Pan-STARRS 1	H	500 m	MPC · JPL
557220	2014 TX_{87}	—	September 30, 2005	Mount Lemmon	Mount Lemmon Survey	GAL	1.1 km	MPC · JPL
557221	2014 TZ_{87}	—	December 10, 2010	Mount Lemmon	Mount Lemmon Survey	AEO	840 m	MPC · JPL
557222	2014 TP_{88}	—	December 31, 2007	Mount Lemmon	Mount Lemmon Survey	RAF	1.0 km	MPC · JPL
557223	2014 TV_{90}	—	October 3, 2014	Mount Lemmon	Mount Lemmon Survey	·	1.6 km	MPC · JPL
557224	2014 TD_{91}	—	October 1, 2014	Haleakala	Pan-STARRS 1	MAR	860 m	MPC · JPL
557225	2014 TS_{91}	—	December 13, 2010	Mount Lemmon	Mount Lemmon Survey	·	1.7 km	MPC · JPL
557226	2014 TM_{92}	—	April 19, 2013	Haleakala	Pan-STARRS 1	·	1.2 km	MPC · JPL
557227	2014 TZ_{92}	—	December 14, 2010	Mount Lemmon	Mount Lemmon Survey	·	1.8 km	MPC · JPL
557228	2014 TY_{94}	—	July 28, 2005	Palomar	NEAT	·	1.7 km	MPC · JPL
557229	2014 TG_{95}	—	October 1, 2014	Haleakala	Pan-STARRS 1	·	570 m	MPC · JPL
557230	2014 TO_{95}	—	October 3, 2014	Kitt Peak	Spacewatch	HNS	780 m	MPC · JPL
557231	2014 TZ_{95}	—	October 14, 2014	Mount Lemmon	Mount Lemmon Survey	·	470 m	MPC · JPL
557232	2014 TJ_{96}	—	October 5, 2014	Mount Lemmon	Mount Lemmon Survey	DOR	1.8 km	MPC · JPL
557233	2014 TZ_{102}	—	October 3, 2014	Mount Lemmon	Mount Lemmon Survey	·	960 m	MPC · JPL
557234	2014 TA_{103}	—	October 4, 2014	Mount Lemmon	Mount Lemmon Survey	·	1.7 km	MPC · JPL
557235	2014 TF_{103}	—	October 4, 2014	Haleakala	Pan-STARRS 1	HNS	890 m	MPC · JPL
557236	2014 TT_{106}	—	October 2, 2014	Haleakala	Pan-STARRS 1	·	1.9 km	MPC · JPL
557237	2014 TG_{107}	—	October 1, 2014	Haleakala	Pan-STARRS 1	·	2.7 km	MPC · JPL
557238	2014 TC_{108}	—	October 14, 2014	Mount Lemmon	Mount Lemmon Survey	·	2.3 km	MPC · JPL
557239	2014 UL	—	September 18, 2014	Haleakala	Pan-STARRS 1	·	2.0 km	MPC · JPL
557240	2014 UZ	—	November 5, 2010	Mount Lemmon	Mount Lemmon Survey	ADE	2.0 km	MPC · JPL
557241	2014 UP_{1}	—	April 27, 2012	Haleakala	Pan-STARRS 1	·	1.8 km	MPC · JPL
557242	2014 US_{3}	—	October 20, 2001	Socorro	LINEAR	ADE	2.1 km	MPC · JPL
557243	2014 UG_{4}	—	December 2, 2010	Mount Lemmon	Mount Lemmon Survey	·	1.0 km	MPC · JPL
557244	2014 UV_{4}	—	January 2, 2000	Kitt Peak	Spacewatch	·	2.5 km	MPC · JPL
557245	2014 UD_{5}	—	October 22, 2003	Kitt Peak	Spacewatch	·	3.1 km	MPC · JPL
557246	2014 UM_{5}	—	September 18, 2009	Kitt Peak	Spacewatch	·	1.6 km	MPC · JPL
557247	2014 UL_{6}	—	August 5, 2005	Palomar	NEAT	·	1.4 km	MPC · JPL
557248	2014 UE_{9}	—	November 21, 2009	Mount Lemmon	Mount Lemmon Survey	·	1.7 km	MPC · JPL
557249	2014 UA_{10}	—	September 20, 2003	Palomar	NEAT	·	2.4 km	MPC · JPL
557250	2014 UW_{11}	—	March 27, 2008	Kitt Peak	Spacewatch	·	2.0 km	MPC · JPL
557251	2014 US_{13}	—	October 29, 2005	Kitt Peak	Spacewatch	·	1.5 km	MPC · JPL
557252	2014 UA_{14}	—	November 14, 2010	Kitt Peak	Spacewatch	·	1.6 km	MPC · JPL
557253	2014 UL_{14}	—	October 13, 2005	Kitt Peak	Spacewatch	·	1.3 km	MPC · JPL
557254	2014 UO_{16}	—	September 25, 2014	Kitt Peak	Spacewatch	EUN	1.0 km	MPC · JPL
557255	2014 UE_{18}	—	August 29, 2009	Kitt Peak	Spacewatch	HOF	2.2 km	MPC · JPL
557256	2014 UH_{20}	—	April 18, 2009	Mount Lemmon	Mount Lemmon Survey	·	870 m	MPC · JPL
557257	2014 UA_{22}	—	April 11, 2008	Kitt Peak	Spacewatch	L5	8.5 km	MPC · JPL
557258	2014 UY_{22}	—	October 17, 2009	Mount Lemmon	Mount Lemmon Survey	·	1.9 km	MPC · JPL
557259	2014 UD_{23}	—	September 16, 2003	Kitt Peak	Spacewatch	·	1.8 km	MPC · JPL
557260	2014 UQ_{27}	—	September 2, 2014	La Palma	La Palma	L5	9.2 km	MPC · JPL
557261	2014 UX_{27}	—	February 25, 2011	Mount Lemmon	Mount Lemmon Survey	·	1.7 km	MPC · JPL
557262	2014 UN_{28}	—	July 3, 2005	Palomar	NEAT	·	1.4 km	MPC · JPL
557263	2014 UD_{30}	—	September 20, 2009	Kitt Peak	Spacewatch	·	1.8 km	MPC · JPL
557264	2014 UF_{30}	—	January 28, 2007	Kitt Peak	Spacewatch	·	1.6 km	MPC · JPL
557265	2014 UN_{30}	—	September 20, 2014	Haleakala	Pan-STARRS 1	·	1.8 km	MPC · JPL
557266	2014 UW_{30}	—	January 8, 2011	Mount Lemmon	Mount Lemmon Survey	·	3.2 km	MPC · JPL
557267	2014 UP_{31}	—	October 21, 2014	Mount Lemmon	Mount Lemmon Survey	·	1.7 km	MPC · JPL
557268	2014 UM_{32}	—	July 1, 2013	Haleakala	Pan-STARRS 1	·	1.6 km	MPC · JPL
557269	2014 UF_{33}	—	October 20, 2007	Mount Lemmon	Mount Lemmon Survey	·	1.0 km	MPC · JPL
557270	2014 UA_{34}	—	October 22, 2014	Mount Lemmon	Mount Lemmon Survey	H	410 m	MPC · JPL
557271	2014 UC_{34}	—	October 23, 2014	Mount Lemmon	Mount Lemmon Survey	H	470 m	MPC · JPL
557272	2014 UP_{34}	—	August 23, 2011	Haleakala	Pan-STARRS 1	H	500 m	MPC · JPL
557273	2014 UC_{35}	—	July 30, 2001	Palomar	NEAT	MAR	1.0 km	MPC · JPL
557274	2014 UV_{35}	—	October 18, 2014	Mount Lemmon	Mount Lemmon Survey	·	1.7 km	MPC · JPL
557275	2014 UF_{36}	—	November 25, 2005	Mount Lemmon	Mount Lemmon Survey	·	1.6 km	MPC · JPL
557276	2014 UN_{36}	—	October 18, 2014	Mount Lemmon	Mount Lemmon Survey	AGN	940 m	MPC · JPL
557277	2014 UP_{36}	—	October 29, 2005	Mount Lemmon	Mount Lemmon Survey	·	1.5 km	MPC · JPL
557278	2014 UT_{36}	—	September 30, 2006	Mount Lemmon	Mount Lemmon Survey	RAF	1.0 km	MPC · JPL
557279	2014 UY_{38}	—	October 18, 2014	Mount Lemmon	Mount Lemmon Survey	·	690 m	MPC · JPL
557280	2014 UO_{39}	—	October 1, 2005	Mount Lemmon	Mount Lemmon Survey	·	1.8 km	MPC · JPL
557281	2014 UG_{41}	—	April 7, 2005	Kitt Peak	Spacewatch	·	3.1 km	MPC · JPL
557282	2014 UH_{41}	—	October 22, 2003	Apache Point	SDSS	·	2.0 km	MPC · JPL
557283	2014 UR_{41}	—	December 1, 2006	Mount Lemmon	Mount Lemmon Survey	·	1.2 km	MPC · JPL
557284	2014 UQ_{42}	—	September 18, 2001	Palomar	NEAT	·	3.0 km	MPC · JPL
557285	2014 UT_{42}	—	October 3, 2014	Mount Lemmon	Mount Lemmon Survey	·	2.3 km	MPC · JPL
557286	2014 UV_{42}	—	August 17, 2009	Kitt Peak	Spacewatch	·	1.7 km	MPC · JPL
557287	2014 UA_{43}	—	March 23, 1999	Catalina	CSS	·	2.3 km	MPC · JPL
557288	2014 UG_{43}	—	July 13, 2013	Haleakala	Pan-STARRS 1	·	2.0 km	MPC · JPL
557289	2014 UO_{43}	—	October 21, 2014	Kitt Peak	Spacewatch	·	2.0 km	MPC · JPL
557290	2014 UW_{43}	—	September 29, 2005	Kitt Peak	Spacewatch	·	1.6 km	MPC · JPL
557291	2014 UH_{44}	—	April 16, 2013	Haleakala	Pan-STARRS 1	·	790 m	MPC · JPL
557292	2014 US_{44}	—	October 15, 2001	Kitt Peak	Spacewatch	·	1.7 km	MPC · JPL
557293	2014 UP_{47}	—	October 21, 2014	Kitt Peak	Spacewatch	·	1.1 km	MPC · JPL
557294	2014 UR_{47}	—	November 6, 2010	Kitt Peak	Spacewatch	·	950 m	MPC · JPL
557295	2014 UZ_{54}	—	January 4, 2011	Mount Lemmon	Mount Lemmon Survey	·	1.9 km	MPC · JPL
557296	2014 UA_{56}	—	October 15, 2009	Mount Lemmon	Mount Lemmon Survey	AGN	1.0 km	MPC · JPL
557297	2014 UP_{56}	—	February 26, 2012	Kitt Peak	Spacewatch	·	1.9 km	MPC · JPL
557298	2014 US_{57}	—	November 16, 2009	Mount Lemmon	Mount Lemmon Survey	H	470 m	MPC · JPL
557299	2014 UV_{58}	—	October 18, 2014	Mount Lemmon	Mount Lemmon Survey	AGN	1.2 km	MPC · JPL
557300	2014 UO_{59}	—	March 16, 2012	Mount Lemmon	Mount Lemmon Survey	·	1.0 km	MPC · JPL

== 557301–557400 ==
back to top

Designation			Discovery			Properties		Ref
Permanent	Provisional	Named after	Date	Site	Discoverer(s)	Category	Diam.	Ref
557301	2014 UH_{61}	—	October 12, 2010	Mount Lemmon	Mount Lemmon Survey	·	920 m	MPC · JPL
557302	2014 UU_{65}	—	October 20, 2014	Mount Lemmon	Mount Lemmon Survey	·	1.8 km	MPC · JPL
557303	2014 UL_{66}	—	October 20, 2014	Mount Lemmon	Mount Lemmon Survey	GEF	1.1 km	MPC · JPL
557304	2014 UN_{66}	—	October 20, 2014	Mount Lemmon	Mount Lemmon Survey	·	1.3 km	MPC · JPL
557305	2014 UN_{67}	—	October 1, 2005	Mount Lemmon	Mount Lemmon Survey	·	1.7 km	MPC · JPL
557306	2014 UV_{67}	—	September 26, 2014	Mount Lemmon	Mount Lemmon Survey	·	1.2 km	MPC · JPL
557307	2014 UP_{68}	—	October 21, 2014	Mount Lemmon	Mount Lemmon Survey	·	1.3 km	MPC · JPL
557308	2014 UQ_{68}	—	April 28, 2008	Kitt Peak	Spacewatch	·	2.1 km	MPC · JPL
557309	2014 UR_{72}	—	October 29, 2010	Mount Lemmon	Mount Lemmon Survey	·	1.1 km	MPC · JPL
557310	2014 UT_{72}	—	March 29, 2012	Kitt Peak	Spacewatch	·	2.8 km	MPC · JPL
557311	2014 UG_{74}	—	September 30, 2005	Mount Lemmon	Mount Lemmon Survey	PAD	1.5 km	MPC · JPL
557312	2014 UR_{76}	—	February 12, 2008	Kitt Peak	Spacewatch	·	1.3 km	MPC · JPL
557313	2014 UM_{77}	—	October 18, 2009	Mount Lemmon	Mount Lemmon Survey	·	1.3 km	MPC · JPL
557314	2014 UK_{84}	—	October 21, 2014	Mount Lemmon	Mount Lemmon Survey	·	2.0 km	MPC · JPL
557315	2014 UV_{84}	—	October 22, 2009	Mount Lemmon	Mount Lemmon Survey	·	1.7 km	MPC · JPL
557316	2014 UW_{84}	—	August 25, 2004	Kitt Peak	Spacewatch	·	2.0 km	MPC · JPL
557317	2014 UV_{88}	—	September 24, 2014	Mount Lemmon	Mount Lemmon Survey	·	1.4 km	MPC · JPL
557318	2014 UQ_{89}	—	October 29, 2005	Mount Lemmon	Mount Lemmon Survey	·	1.5 km	MPC · JPL
557319	2014 UW_{89}	—	November 3, 2005	Mount Lemmon	Mount Lemmon Survey	HOF	2.4 km	MPC · JPL
557320	2014 UX_{89}	—	February 10, 2007	Mount Lemmon	Mount Lemmon Survey	·	1.4 km	MPC · JPL
557321	2014 UY_{89}	—	September 24, 2014	Mount Lemmon	Mount Lemmon Survey	·	1.6 km	MPC · JPL
557322	2014 UY_{90}	—	December 21, 2005	Kitt Peak	Spacewatch	HOF	2.1 km	MPC · JPL
557323	2014 UD_{91}	—	October 22, 2014	Mount Lemmon	Mount Lemmon Survey	·	1.5 km	MPC · JPL
557324	2014 UJ_{91}	—	March 23, 2012	Mount Lemmon	Mount Lemmon Survey	·	1.6 km	MPC · JPL
557325	2014 UR_{91}	—	March 31, 2008	Kitt Peak	Spacewatch	·	1.2 km	MPC · JPL
557326	2014 UG_{92}	—	January 15, 2005	Kitt Peak	Spacewatch	·	2.5 km	MPC · JPL
557327	2014 UN_{92}	—	November 3, 2010	Kitt Peak	Spacewatch	·	1.1 km	MPC · JPL
557328	2014 UY_{92}	—	September 16, 2009	Kitt Peak	Spacewatch	·	1.8 km	MPC · JPL
557329	2014 UO_{93}	—	October 22, 2014	Mount Lemmon	Mount Lemmon Survey	RAF	840 m	MPC · JPL
557330	2014 UX_{93}	—	December 4, 2005	Kitt Peak	Spacewatch	·	2.0 km	MPC · JPL
557331	2014 US_{96}	—	October 23, 2014	Kitt Peak	Spacewatch	·	1.1 km	MPC · JPL
557332	2014 UA_{97}	—	April 29, 2008	Kitt Peak	Spacewatch	·	1.6 km	MPC · JPL
557333	2014 UK_{97}	—	April 27, 2012	Haleakala	Pan-STARRS 1	·	1.4 km	MPC · JPL
557334	2014 US_{97}	—	October 23, 2014	Kitt Peak	Spacewatch	L5	7.7 km	MPC · JPL
557335	2014 UY_{99}	—	February 9, 2008	Kitt Peak	Spacewatch	·	1.6 km	MPC · JPL
557336	2014 US_{100}	—	December 8, 2010	Mount Lemmon	Mount Lemmon Survey	·	2.0 km	MPC · JPL
557337	2014 UX_{100}	—	September 11, 2010	Mount Lemmon	Mount Lemmon Survey	·	780 m	MPC · JPL
557338	2014 UN_{103}	—	August 27, 2000	Cerro Tololo	Deep Ecliptic Survey	WIT	990 m	MPC · JPL
557339	2014 UA_{104}	—	November 12, 2001	Apache Point	SDSS Collaboration	·	1.5 km	MPC · JPL
557340	2014 UR_{104}	—	September 15, 2006	Kitt Peak	Spacewatch	3:2	4.3 km	MPC · JPL
557341	2014 UM_{105}	—	October 30, 2005	Mount Lemmon	Mount Lemmon Survey	·	1.4 km	MPC · JPL
557342	2014 UE_{106}	—	October 27, 2005	Mount Lemmon	Mount Lemmon Survey	·	1.3 km	MPC · JPL
557343	2014 UO_{107}	—	September 26, 2014	Kitt Peak	Spacewatch	·	2.1 km	MPC · JPL
557344	2014 UJ_{108}	—	September 30, 2005	Mount Lemmon	Mount Lemmon Survey	·	1.6 km	MPC · JPL
557345	2014 UU_{108}	—	April 7, 1997	Kitt Peak	Spacewatch	H	490 m	MPC · JPL
557346	2014 UA_{110}	—	September 25, 2014	Catalina	CSS	·	2.1 km	MPC · JPL
557347	2014 UL_{110}	—	December 24, 2006	Kitt Peak	Spacewatch	·	1.5 km	MPC · JPL
557348	2014 UV_{112}	—	September 14, 2005	Kitt Peak	Spacewatch	·	1.6 km	MPC · JPL
557349	2014 UO_{113}	—	October 25, 2014	Haleakala	Pan-STARRS 1	·	1.2 km	MPC · JPL
557350	2014 UC_{116}	—	April 15, 2013	Haleakala	Pan-STARRS 1	H	640 m	MPC · JPL
557351	2014 UJ_{116}	—	April 10, 2013	Haleakala	Pan-STARRS 1	H	560 m	MPC · JPL
557352	2014 UA_{119}	—	March 16, 2012	Kitt Peak	Spacewatch	AGN	1.0 km	MPC · JPL
557353	2014 UJ_{120}	—	September 24, 2014	Mount Lemmon	Mount Lemmon Survey	·	1.2 km	MPC · JPL
557354	2014 UX_{120}	—	December 18, 2001	Socorro	LINEAR	·	1.5 km	MPC · JPL
557355	2014 UB_{121}	—	April 22, 2007	Mount Lemmon	Mount Lemmon Survey	·	2.6 km	MPC · JPL
557356	2014 UH_{122}	—	July 31, 2005	Palomar	NEAT	·	1.6 km	MPC · JPL
557357	2014 UL_{124}	—	June 18, 2013	Haleakala	Pan-STARRS 1	·	1.7 km	MPC · JPL
557358	2014 UK_{125}	—	October 22, 2014	Catalina	CSS	·	2.0 km	MPC · JPL
557359	2014 UL_{125}	—	July 12, 2005	Mount Lemmon	Mount Lemmon Survey	·	1.2 km	MPC · JPL
557360	2014 UY_{125}	—	October 1, 2000	Socorro	LINEAR	·	2.3 km	MPC · JPL
557361	2014 UR_{127}	—	October 23, 2014	Kitt Peak	Spacewatch	·	1.4 km	MPC · JPL
557362	2014 UW_{127}	—	March 11, 2003	Kitt Peak	Spacewatch	·	1.6 km	MPC · JPL
557363	2014 UY_{127}	—	September 24, 2014	Mount Lemmon	Mount Lemmon Survey	·	890 m	MPC · JPL
557364	2014 UB_{128}	—	April 17, 2013	Haleakala	Pan-STARRS 1	·	1.1 km	MPC · JPL
557365	2014 UT_{129}	—	September 29, 2005	Kitt Peak	Spacewatch	·	1.5 km	MPC · JPL
557366	2014 UE_{131}	—	March 5, 2008	Mount Lemmon	Mount Lemmon Survey	·	1.4 km	MPC · JPL
557367	2014 UO_{131}	—	June 29, 2005	Kitt Peak	Spacewatch	·	1.3 km	MPC · JPL
557368	2014 UX_{131}	—	December 7, 2005	Kitt Peak	Spacewatch	·	1.7 km	MPC · JPL
557369	2014 UQ_{133}	—	August 26, 2005	Palomar	NEAT	·	1.2 km	MPC · JPL
557370	2014 UV_{133}	—	September 29, 2005	Kitt Peak	Spacewatch	WIT	860 m	MPC · JPL
557371	2014 UD_{134}	—	April 3, 2008	Kitt Peak	Spacewatch	HNS	1.1 km	MPC · JPL
557372	2014 UO_{134}	—	August 17, 2009	Kitt Peak	Spacewatch	·	1.4 km	MPC · JPL
557373	2014 UR_{137}	—	October 3, 2014	Mount Lemmon	Mount Lemmon Survey	·	1.9 km	MPC · JPL
557374	2014 UO_{138}	—	June 18, 2013	Haleakala	Pan-STARRS 1	WIT	980 m	MPC · JPL
557375	2014 UL_{139}	—	January 28, 2007	Kitt Peak	Spacewatch	HOF	2.7 km	MPC · JPL
557376	2014 UN_{139}	—	November 12, 2005	Kitt Peak	Spacewatch	PAD	1.2 km	MPC · JPL
557377	2014 UZ_{139}	—	September 15, 2009	Mount Lemmon	Mount Lemmon Survey	·	1.8 km	MPC · JPL
557378	2014 UA_{141}	—	March 30, 2008	Kitt Peak	Spacewatch	·	1.6 km	MPC · JPL
557379	2014 UT_{141}	—	October 7, 2005	Mount Lemmon	Mount Lemmon Survey	·	1.6 km	MPC · JPL
557380	2014 UL_{142}	—	April 12, 2013	Haleakala	Pan-STARRS 1	·	1.5 km	MPC · JPL
557381	2014 UM_{142}	—	October 30, 2005	Kitt Peak	Spacewatch	·	1.5 km	MPC · JPL
557382	2014 UW_{142}	—	September 23, 2009	Mount Lemmon	Mount Lemmon Survey	·	1.8 km	MPC · JPL
557383	2014 UK_{143}	—	October 27, 2005	Kitt Peak	Spacewatch	HOF	2.4 km	MPC · JPL
557384	2014 UP_{144}	—	March 12, 2008	Mount Lemmon	Mount Lemmon Survey	·	1.1 km	MPC · JPL
557385	2014 UR_{145}	—	February 28, 2012	Haleakala	Pan-STARRS 1	·	1.5 km	MPC · JPL
557386	2014 UZ_{145}	—	March 27, 2008	Kitt Peak	Spacewatch	·	1.8 km	MPC · JPL
557387	2014 UR_{146}	—	May 15, 2013	Haleakala	Pan-STARRS 1	EUN	890 m	MPC · JPL
557388	2014 UL_{149}	—	July 28, 2014	Haleakala	Pan-STARRS 1	·	1.6 km	MPC · JPL
557389	2014 UF_{150}	—	April 1, 2011	Kitt Peak	Spacewatch	·	2.2 km	MPC · JPL
557390	2014 UM_{150}	—	February 22, 2007	Kitt Peak	Spacewatch	·	1.2 km	MPC · JPL
557391	2014 UP_{151}	—	March 4, 2005	Mount Lemmon	Mount Lemmon Survey	·	2.5 km	MPC · JPL
557392	2014 UB_{152}	—	December 10, 2010	Mount Lemmon	Mount Lemmon Survey	AGN	1 km	MPC · JPL
557393	2014 UF_{152}	—	March 15, 2012	Mount Lemmon	Mount Lemmon Survey	·	1.5 km	MPC · JPL
557394	2014 UY_{152}	—	May 3, 2005	Kitt Peak	Spacewatch	H	380 m	MPC · JPL
557395	2014 UK_{154}	—	March 9, 2007	Kitt Peak	Spacewatch	·	1.7 km	MPC · JPL
557396 Crailsheim	2014 UO_{154}	Crailsheim	March 29, 2012	Haleakala	Pan-STARRS 1	·	1.9 km	MPC · JPL
557397	2014 UW_{154}	—	April 12, 2012	Haleakala	Pan-STARRS 1	·	1.7 km	MPC · JPL
557398	2014 UT_{155}	—	April 19, 2013	Haleakala	Pan-STARRS 1	MAR	810 m	MPC · JPL
557399	2014 UJ_{156}	—	November 30, 2010	Mount Lemmon	Mount Lemmon Survey	(5)	1.1 km	MPC · JPL
557400	2014 UR_{157}	—	April 29, 2008	Mount Lemmon	Mount Lemmon Survey	·	1.8 km	MPC · JPL

== 557401–557500 ==
back to top

Designation			Discovery			Properties		Ref
Permanent	Provisional	Named after	Date	Site	Discoverer(s)	Category	Diam.	Ref
557401	2014 UT_{158}	—	August 31, 2014	Haleakala	Pan-STARRS 1	·	1.2 km	MPC · JPL
557402	2014 UU_{158}	—	December 1, 2005	Mount Lemmon	Mount Lemmon Survey	·	1.8 km	MPC · JPL
557403	2014 UV_{158}	—	September 25, 2005	Kitt Peak	Spacewatch	·	1.6 km	MPC · JPL
557404	2014 UM_{160}	—	December 2, 2010	Mount Lemmon	Mount Lemmon Survey	EUN	880 m	MPC · JPL
557405	2014 UO_{160}	—	October 25, 2014	Haleakala	Pan-STARRS 1	·	1.7 km	MPC · JPL
557406	2014 UJ_{163}	—	October 20, 2003	Palomar	NEAT	H	500 m	MPC · JPL
557407	2014 UE_{164}	—	October 18, 2014	Nogales	M. Schwartz, P. R. Holvorcem	H	470 m	MPC · JPL
557408	2014 UE_{166}	—	March 13, 2012	Mount Lemmon	Mount Lemmon Survey	·	1.8 km	MPC · JPL
557409	2014 UJ_{168}	—	August 16, 2009	Kitt Peak	Spacewatch	·	1.6 km	MPC · JPL
557410	2014 UW_{170}	—	December 2, 2010	Catalina	CSS	·	1.6 km	MPC · JPL
557411	2014 UF_{172}	—	November 17, 2006	Mount Lemmon	Mount Lemmon Survey	·	820 m	MPC · JPL
557412	2014 US_{173}	—	October 28, 2014	Mount Lemmon	Mount Lemmon Survey	·	1.5 km	MPC · JPL
557413	2014 UZ_{173}	—	November 1, 2005	Mount Lemmon	Mount Lemmon Survey	GEF	1.2 km	MPC · JPL
557414	2014 UU_{174}	—	April 25, 2008	Kitt Peak	Spacewatch	WIT	1.1 km	MPC · JPL
557415	2014 UV_{174}	—	March 26, 2003	Palomar	NEAT	·	2.5 km	MPC · JPL
557416	2014 UX_{177}	—	October 8, 2008	Kitt Peak	Spacewatch	·	2.4 km	MPC · JPL
557417	2014 UQ_{178}	—	May 30, 2003	Cerro Tololo	Deep Ecliptic Survey	·	1.6 km	MPC · JPL
557418	2014 UX_{178}	—	March 29, 2008	Mount Lemmon	Mount Lemmon Survey	·	1.4 km	MPC · JPL
557419	2014 UJ_{180}	—	March 15, 2007	Mount Lemmon	Mount Lemmon Survey	·	1.9 km	MPC · JPL
557420	2014 UL_{180}	—	October 2, 2014	Haleakala	Pan-STARRS 1	·	1.3 km	MPC · JPL
557421	2014 UE_{181}	—	January 10, 2007	Mount Lemmon	Mount Lemmon Survey	·	1.4 km	MPC · JPL
557422	2014 UF_{182}	—	October 18, 2014	Kitt Peak	Spacewatch	·	1.8 km	MPC · JPL
557423	2014 UU_{183}	—	October 25, 2005	Mount Lemmon	Mount Lemmon Survey	·	1.4 km	MPC · JPL
557424	2014 UX_{184}	—	March 7, 2013	Haleakala	Pan-STARRS 1	H	550 m	MPC · JPL
557425	2014 UH_{185}	—	November 12, 2010	Kitt Peak	Spacewatch	EUN · slow	1.1 km	MPC · JPL
557426	2014 UG_{186}	—	November 26, 2005	Mount Lemmon	Mount Lemmon Survey	·	1.6 km	MPC · JPL
557427	2014 UQ_{186}	—	August 28, 2009	Kitt Peak	Spacewatch	·	1.7 km	MPC · JPL
557428	2014 UT_{186}	—	January 29, 2003	Apache Point	SDSS Collaboration	·	1.5 km	MPC · JPL
557429	2014 UD_{187}	—	January 4, 2011	Mount Lemmon	Mount Lemmon Survey	AGN	810 m	MPC · JPL
557430	2014 UM_{187}	—	September 30, 2005	Mount Lemmon	Mount Lemmon Survey	·	1.2 km	MPC · JPL
557431	2014 UT_{188}	—	April 15, 2008	Mount Lemmon	Mount Lemmon Survey	·	1.5 km	MPC · JPL
557432	2014 UY_{190}	—	March 14, 2011	Mount Lemmon	Mount Lemmon Survey	·	1.6 km	MPC · JPL
557433	2014 UU_{191}	—	November 21, 2003	Socorro	LINEAR	H	610 m	MPC · JPL
557434	2014 UN_{193}	—	September 27, 2006	Kitt Peak	Spacewatch	T_{j} (2.99) · 3:2	4.1 km	MPC · JPL
557435	2014 UQ_{193}	—	December 9, 2010	Kitt Peak	Spacewatch	·	1.3 km	MPC · JPL
557436	2014 UG_{194}	—	October 22, 2005	Kitt Peak	Spacewatch	·	1.6 km	MPC · JPL
557437	2014 UQ_{195}	—	September 24, 2014	Kitt Peak	Spacewatch	·	1.5 km	MPC · JPL
557438	2014 UU_{195}	—	June 5, 2013	Kitt Peak	Spacewatch	PHO	1.0 km	MPC · JPL
557439	2014 UC_{196}	—	August 12, 2001	Palomar	NEAT	EUN	1.4 km	MPC · JPL
557440	2014 UM_{197}	—	October 25, 2014	Haleakala	Pan-STARRS 1	PAD	1.8 km	MPC · JPL
557441	2014 UL_{200}	—	August 1, 2009	Kitt Peak	Spacewatch	NEM	1.9 km	MPC · JPL
557442	2014 UT_{200}	—	November 10, 2005	Mount Lemmon	Mount Lemmon Survey	·	2.0 km	MPC · JPL
557443	2014 UY_{200}	—	March 19, 2010	Catalina	CSS	T_{j} (2.92)	2.0 km	MPC · JPL
557444	2014 UX_{201}	—	March 14, 2012	Kitt Peak	Spacewatch	·	1.8 km	MPC · JPL
557445	2014 UU_{203}	—	December 12, 2006	Mount Lemmon	Mount Lemmon Survey	·	1.8 km	MPC · JPL
557446	2014 UK_{204}	—	October 16, 2001	Kitt Peak	Spacewatch	·	1.1 km	MPC · JPL
557447	2014 UL_{204}	—	February 7, 2011	Mount Lemmon	Mount Lemmon Survey	·	1.9 km	MPC · JPL
557448	2014 UQ_{206}	—	February 28, 2012	Haleakala	Pan-STARRS 1	·	1.6 km	MPC · JPL
557449	2014 UT_{209}	—	April 20, 2012	Mount Lemmon	Mount Lemmon Survey	·	1.6 km	MPC · JPL
557450	2014 UN_{213}	—	February 28, 2012	Haleakala	Pan-STARRS 1	HNS	1.1 km	MPC · JPL
557451	2014 UV_{213}	—	April 13, 2013	ESA OGS	ESA OGS	·	2.1 km	MPC · JPL
557452	2014 UC_{214}	—	April 22, 2013	Mount Lemmon	Mount Lemmon Survey	·	2.9 km	MPC · JPL
557453	2014 UE_{214}	—	November 18, 2003	Kitt Peak	Spacewatch	·	3.2 km	MPC · JPL
557454	2014 UJ_{214}	—	November 21, 2001	Apache Point	SDSS	·	2.2 km	MPC · JPL
557455	2014 UM_{214}	—	March 16, 2012	Kitt Peak	Spacewatch	·	2.0 km	MPC · JPL
557456	2014 UU_{214}	—	September 2, 2014	Haleakala	Pan-STARRS 1	·	1.4 km	MPC · JPL
557457	2014 UQ_{215}	—	September 6, 2008	Mount Lemmon	Mount Lemmon Survey	TIR	2.1 km	MPC · JPL
557458	2014 UV_{215}	—	October 7, 2014	Haleakala	Pan-STARRS 1	·	1.7 km	MPC · JPL
557459	2014 UE_{218}	—	March 9, 2007	Catalina	CSS	·	2.7 km	MPC · JPL
557460	2014 UZ_{218}	—	February 2, 2005	Kitt Peak	Spacewatch	TIR	3.0 km	MPC · JPL
557461	2014 UO_{220}	—	October 1, 2005	Catalina	CSS	·	1.9 km	MPC · JPL
557462	2014 UM_{221}	—	November 27, 2010	Mount Lemmon	Mount Lemmon Survey	·	1.4 km	MPC · JPL
557463	2014 UV_{221}	—	May 8, 2013	Haleakala	Pan-STARRS 1	·	1.3 km	MPC · JPL
557464	2014 UW_{223}	—	November 19, 2000	Socorro	LINEAR	H	590 m	MPC · JPL
557465	2014 UY_{223}	—	October 12, 2001	Haleakala	NEAT	ADE	2.3 km	MPC · JPL
557466	2014 UA_{224}	—	September 28, 2003	Anderson Mesa	LONEOS	·	3.0 km	MPC · JPL
557467	2014 UF_{225}	—	October 13, 2014	Mount Lemmon	Mount Lemmon Survey	·	1.3 km	MPC · JPL
557468	2014 UA_{228}	—	October 30, 2014	Haleakala	Pan-STARRS 1	·	1.9 km	MPC · JPL
557469	2014 UJ_{230}	—	April 4, 2008	Mount Lemmon	Mount Lemmon Survey	·	1.7 km	MPC · JPL
557470	2014 UB_{231}	—	September 20, 2008	Mount Lemmon	Mount Lemmon Survey	·	1.9 km	MPC · JPL
557471	2014 UV_{231}	—	October 22, 2003	Kitt Peak	Spacewatch	·	2.0 km	MPC · JPL
557472	2014 UD_{232}	—	October 12, 2009	Mount Lemmon	Mount Lemmon Survey	·	1.3 km	MPC · JPL
557473	2014 UP_{232}	—	November 8, 2010	Kitt Peak	Spacewatch	·	1.6 km	MPC · JPL
557474	2014 UL_{233}	—	December 11, 2001	Kitt Peak	Spacewatch	·	1.9 km	MPC · JPL
557475	2014 UQ_{233}	—	October 17, 2014	Kitt Peak	Spacewatch	·	1.6 km	MPC · JPL
557476	2014 UW_{233}	—	October 18, 2014	Nogales	M. Schwartz, P. R. Holvorcem	·	1.1 km	MPC · JPL
557477	2014 UB_{234}	—	August 27, 2009	Kitt Peak	Spacewatch	·	1.9 km	MPC · JPL
557478	2014 UE_{234}	—	December 14, 2010	Mount Lemmon	Mount Lemmon Survey	·	1.4 km	MPC · JPL
557479	2014 UO_{234}	—	October 22, 2014	Kitt Peak	Spacewatch	·	1.1 km	MPC · JPL
557480	2014 UV_{234}	—	October 22, 2014	Mount Lemmon	Mount Lemmon Survey	THM	1.6 km	MPC · JPL
557481	2014 UD_{235}	—	October 23, 2014	Kitt Peak	Spacewatch	·	1.1 km	MPC · JPL
557482	2014 UO_{235}	—	October 25, 2014	Mount Lemmon	Mount Lemmon Survey	·	1.1 km	MPC · JPL
557483	2014 UY_{235}	—	October 25, 2014	Haleakala	Pan-STARRS 1	·	1.6 km	MPC · JPL
557484	2014 UZ_{235}	—	January 27, 2007	Kitt Peak	Spacewatch	·	1.6 km	MPC · JPL
557485	2014 UM_{236}	—	October 25, 2014	Haleakala	Pan-STARRS 1	·	1.9 km	MPC · JPL
557486	2014 UB_{237}	—	March 2, 2006	Kitt Peak	Spacewatch	·	3.0 km	MPC · JPL
557487	2014 UC_{237}	—	October 26, 2014	Haleakala	Pan-STARRS 1	·	1.4 km	MPC · JPL
557488	2014 UE_{237}	—	September 22, 2009	Kitt Peak	Spacewatch	·	1.6 km	MPC · JPL
557489	2014 UJ_{237}	—	November 4, 2005	Mount Lemmon	Mount Lemmon Survey	HOF	2.1 km	MPC · JPL
557490	2014 UL_{237}	—	August 3, 2013	Haleakala	Pan-STARRS 1	·	1.6 km	MPC · JPL
557491	2014 UM_{237}	—	October 28, 2014	Mount Lemmon	Mount Lemmon Survey	·	1.3 km	MPC · JPL
557492	2014 UR_{237}	—	October 28, 2014	Haleakala	Pan-STARRS 1	·	1.2 km	MPC · JPL
557493	2014 UJ_{239}	—	October 29, 2014	Haleakala	Pan-STARRS 1	·	1.5 km	MPC · JPL
557494	2014 UQ_{239}	—	October 29, 2014	Haleakala	Pan-STARRS 1	·	1.2 km	MPC · JPL
557495	2014 UU_{239}	—	October 29, 2014	Haleakala	Pan-STARRS 1	·	1.8 km	MPC · JPL
557496	2014 UY_{239}	—	January 14, 2011	Mount Lemmon	Mount Lemmon Survey	·	1.7 km	MPC · JPL
557497	2014 UA_{240}	—	October 29, 2014	Haleakala	Pan-STARRS 1	·	1.4 km	MPC · JPL
557498	2014 UN_{240}	—	September 12, 2005	Kitt Peak	Spacewatch	·	1.3 km	MPC · JPL
557499	2014 UY_{240}	—	October 24, 2014	Mount Lemmon	Mount Lemmon Survey	·	730 m	MPC · JPL
557500	2014 UR_{242}	—	October 26, 2014	Mount Lemmon	Mount Lemmon Survey	·	1.4 km	MPC · JPL

== 557501–557600 ==
back to top

Designation			Discovery			Properties		Ref
Permanent	Provisional	Named after	Date	Site	Discoverer(s)	Category	Diam.	Ref
557501	2014 UF_{249}	—	July 29, 2008	Kitt Peak	Spacewatch	·	2.5 km	MPC · JPL
557502	2014 UC_{255}	—	October 29, 2014	Haleakala	Pan-STARRS 1	·	1.4 km	MPC · JPL
557503	2014 UX_{261}	—	October 22, 2014	Mount Lemmon	Mount Lemmon Survey	·	1.2 km	MPC · JPL
557504	2014 UZ_{261}	—	October 28, 2014	Haleakala	Pan-STARRS 1	·	2.1 km	MPC · JPL
557505	2014 UB_{262}	—	October 18, 2014	Mount Lemmon	Mount Lemmon Survey	·	780 m	MPC · JPL
557506	2014 UX_{263}	—	October 30, 2014	Mount Lemmon	Mount Lemmon Survey	·	1.9 km	MPC · JPL
557507	2014 VZ	—	March 31, 2008	Mount Lemmon	Mount Lemmon Survey	·	1.9 km	MPC · JPL
557508	2014 VA_{1}	—	October 21, 2002	Palomar	NEAT	T_{j} (2.96)	3.2 km	MPC · JPL
557509	2014 VD_{1}	—	January 11, 2008	Kitt Peak	Spacewatch	·	1.1 km	MPC · JPL
557510	2014 VA_{2}	—	March 18, 2013	Palomar	Palomar Transient Factory	H	590 m	MPC · JPL
557511	2014 VL_{3}	—	March 26, 2011	Kitt Peak	Spacewatch	·	2.2 km	MPC · JPL
557512	2014 VS_{4}	—	September 21, 2003	Palomar	NEAT	·	2.8 km	MPC · JPL
557513	2014 VK_{5}	—	August 6, 2014	Haleakala	Pan-STARRS 1	·	1.7 km	MPC · JPL
557514	2014 VS_{5}	—	October 2, 2014	Haleakala	Pan-STARRS 1	·	1.6 km	MPC · JPL
557515	2014 VV_{5}	—	September 21, 2001	Apache Point	SDSS Collaboration	·	1.2 km	MPC · JPL
557516	2014 VW_{5}	—	September 24, 2014	Kitt Peak	Spacewatch	MAR	820 m	MPC · JPL
557517	2014 VX_{5}	—	May 12, 2012	Mount Lemmon	Mount Lemmon Survey	·	1.8 km	MPC · JPL
557518	2014 VH_{6}	—	March 11, 2005	Catalina	CSS	H	610 m	MPC · JPL
557519	2014 VP_{6}	—	March 25, 2003	Haleakala	NEAT	H	490 m	MPC · JPL
557520	2014 VS_{8}	—	October 22, 2014	Mount Lemmon	Mount Lemmon Survey	H	450 m	MPC · JPL
557521	2014 VT_{8}	—	November 12, 2014	Haleakala	Pan-STARRS 1	MAR	890 m	MPC · JPL
557522	2014 VS_{9}	—	November 12, 2014	Haleakala	Pan-STARRS 1	·	1.6 km	MPC · JPL
557523	2014 VN_{10}	—	September 18, 2014	Haleakala	Pan-STARRS 1	(18466)	2.0 km	MPC · JPL
557524	2014 VC_{11}	—	October 21, 2014	Oukaïmeden	M. Ory	·	2.1 km	MPC · JPL
557525	2014 VS_{12}	—	October 15, 2001	Palomar	NEAT	·	1.3 km	MPC · JPL
557526	2014 VN_{14}	—	October 7, 2014	Haleakala	Pan-STARRS 1	EUN	1.1 km	MPC · JPL
557527	2014 VY_{14}	—	December 3, 2010	Mount Lemmon	Mount Lemmon Survey	·	890 m	MPC · JPL
557528	2014 VK_{15}	—	November 17, 2009	Kitt Peak	Spacewatch	·	1.4 km	MPC · JPL
557529	2014 VQ_{15}	—	November 24, 2003	Socorro	LINEAR	·	2.1 km	MPC · JPL
557530	2014 VY_{17}	—	September 30, 2005	Mount Lemmon	Mount Lemmon Survey	·	1.2 km	MPC · JPL
557531	2014 VC_{18}	—	October 23, 2014	Kitt Peak	Spacewatch	·	2.3 km	MPC · JPL
557532	2014 VU_{19}	—	October 26, 2005	Kitt Peak	Spacewatch	·	1.4 km	MPC · JPL
557533	2014 VB_{24}	—	November 12, 2014	Haleakala	Pan-STARRS 1	H	450 m	MPC · JPL
557534	2014 VX_{26}	—	September 20, 2009	Kitt Peak	Spacewatch	·	1.5 km	MPC · JPL
557535	2014 VY_{26}	—	September 28, 2009	Mount Lemmon	Mount Lemmon Survey	·	1.5 km	MPC · JPL
557536	2014 VM_{27}	—	November 12, 2014	Haleakala	Pan-STARRS 1	·	1.3 km	MPC · JPL
557537	2014 VA_{28}	—	April 7, 2007	Bergisch Gladbach	W. Bickel	·	2.4 km	MPC · JPL
557538	2014 VL_{31}	—	November 14, 2014	Kitt Peak	Spacewatch	·	1.8 km	MPC · JPL
557539	2014 VV_{32}	—	May 31, 2012	Mount Lemmon	Mount Lemmon Survey	EOS	1.7 km	MPC · JPL
557540	2014 VM_{37}	—	September 28, 2009	Kitt Peak	Spacewatch	·	2.9 km	MPC · JPL
557541	2014 VN_{38}	—	January 6, 2010	Mount Lemmon	Mount Lemmon Survey	·	2.0 km	MPC · JPL
557542	2014 VS_{38}	—	September 25, 2009	Catalina	CSS	·	2.3 km	MPC · JPL
557543	2014 VM_{39}	—	November 12, 2014	Haleakala	Pan-STARRS 1	·	1.5 km	MPC · JPL
557544	2014 WR_{1}	—	November 8, 2010	Mount Lemmon	Mount Lemmon Survey	KON	1.6 km	MPC · JPL
557545	2014 WZ_{3}	—	October 8, 2004	Kitt Peak	Spacewatch	·	1.9 km	MPC · JPL
557546	2014 WU_{4}	—	October 4, 2013	Mount Lemmon	Mount Lemmon Survey	L5	7.4 km	MPC · JPL
557547	2014 WN_{5}	—	April 9, 2010	Črni Vrh	Vales, J.	H	630 m	MPC · JPL
557548	2014 WN_{6}	—	March 31, 2008	Mount Lemmon	Mount Lemmon Survey	L5	10 km	MPC · JPL
557549	2014 WU_{7}	—	April 5, 2013	Palomar	Palomar Transient Factory	H	540 m	MPC · JPL
557550	2014 WG_{8}	—	September 24, 2014	Mount Lemmon	Mount Lemmon Survey	·	1.9 km	MPC · JPL
557551	2014 WJ_{8}	—	December 14, 2010	Mount Lemmon	Mount Lemmon Survey	·	1.7 km	MPC · JPL
557552	2014 WO_{11}	—	August 29, 2009	Kitt Peak	Spacewatch	·	1.6 km	MPC · JPL
557553	2014 WT_{12}	—	October 25, 2014	Haleakala	Pan-STARRS 1	·	1.8 km	MPC · JPL
557554	2014 WO_{13}	—	December 10, 2010	Mount Lemmon	Mount Lemmon Survey	HOF	2.2 km	MPC · JPL
557555	2014 WT_{15}	—	October 29, 2014	Kitt Peak	Spacewatch	KON	2.0 km	MPC · JPL
557556	2014 WK_{16}	—	August 31, 2014	Haleakala	Pan-STARRS 1	·	1.9 km	MPC · JPL
557557	2014 WY_{16}	—	May 8, 2013	Haleakala	Pan-STARRS 1	(194)	1.1 km	MPC · JPL
557558	2014 WC_{17}	—	February 8, 2011	Mount Lemmon	Mount Lemmon Survey	KOR	1.1 km	MPC · JPL
557559	2014 WZ_{17}	—	November 4, 2014	Mount Lemmon	Mount Lemmon Survey	·	900 m	MPC · JPL
557560	2014 WR_{18}	—	July 16, 2013	Haleakala	Pan-STARRS 1	·	1.7 km	MPC · JPL
557561	2014 WS_{19}	—	May 1, 2011	Mount Lemmon	Mount Lemmon Survey	·	2.2 km	MPC · JPL
557562	2014 WV_{20}	—	January 8, 2011	Mount Lemmon	Mount Lemmon Survey	·	1.6 km	MPC · JPL
557563	2014 WC_{21}	—	February 9, 2002	Kitt Peak	Spacewatch	AGN	1.1 km	MPC · JPL
557564	2014 WH_{22}	—	October 27, 2005	Kitt Peak	Spacewatch	·	1.7 km	MPC · JPL
557565	2014 WE_{23}	—	February 8, 2011	Mount Lemmon	Mount Lemmon Survey	·	1.6 km	MPC · JPL
557566	2014 WJ_{23}	—	September 15, 2009	Kitt Peak	Spacewatch	WIT	940 m	MPC · JPL
557567	2014 WV_{24}	—	October 22, 2014	Mount Lemmon	Mount Lemmon Survey	·	1.7 km	MPC · JPL
557568	2014 WK_{25}	—	October 22, 2014	Mount Lemmon	Mount Lemmon Survey	·	1.3 km	MPC · JPL
557569	2014 WM_{25}	—	October 24, 2005	Kitt Peak	Spacewatch	NEM	2.3 km	MPC · JPL
557570	2014 WB_{26}	—	December 7, 2005	Kitt Peak	Spacewatch	AGN	1.1 km	MPC · JPL
557571	2014 WA_{29}	—	December 8, 2005	Kitt Peak	Spacewatch	·	1.5 km	MPC · JPL
557572	2014 WG_{31}	—	October 14, 2010	Mount Lemmon	Mount Lemmon Survey	HNS	1.0 km	MPC · JPL
557573	2014 WF_{33}	—	October 28, 2014	Haleakala	Pan-STARRS 1	·	1.4 km	MPC · JPL
557574	2014 WJ_{36}	—	April 21, 2012	Kitt Peak	Spacewatch	HNS	940 m	MPC · JPL
557575	2014 WX_{37}	—	October 21, 2001	Socorro	LINEAR	·	1.5 km	MPC · JPL
557576	2014 WQ_{39}	—	July 13, 2013	Haleakala	Pan-STARRS 1	·	1.6 km	MPC · JPL
557577	2014 WL_{42}	—	October 4, 2014	Mount Lemmon	Mount Lemmon Survey	·	1.7 km	MPC · JPL
557578	2014 WK_{43}	—	November 10, 2005	Kitt Peak	Spacewatch	·	1.9 km	MPC · JPL
557579	2014 WQ_{44}	—	November 17, 2014	Haleakala	Pan-STARRS 1	·	1.7 km	MPC · JPL
557580	2014 WG_{46}	—	September 26, 2009	Kitt Peak	Spacewatch	·	1.5 km	MPC · JPL
557581	2014 WJ_{46}	—	November 25, 2005	Kitt Peak	Spacewatch	·	1.5 km	MPC · JPL
557582	2014 WV_{46}	—	October 19, 2014	Kitt Peak	Spacewatch	·	1.6 km	MPC · JPL
557583	2014 WY_{46}	—	November 17, 2014	Haleakala	Pan-STARRS 1	·	1.4 km	MPC · JPL
557584	2014 WG_{47}	—	January 29, 2011	Mount Lemmon	Mount Lemmon Survey	·	1.4 km	MPC · JPL
557585	2014 WS_{47}	—	September 21, 2009	Mount Lemmon	Mount Lemmon Survey	·	1.7 km	MPC · JPL
557586	2014 WY_{47}	—	April 25, 2007	Mount Lemmon	Mount Lemmon Survey	·	1.7 km	MPC · JPL
557587	2014 WG_{48}	—	November 17, 2014	Haleakala	Pan-STARRS 1	(5)	1.0 km	MPC · JPL
557588	2014 WW_{48}	—	May 15, 2012	Haleakala	Pan-STARRS 1	·	3.5 km	MPC · JPL
557589	2014 WN_{49}	—	January 29, 2011	Mount Lemmon	Mount Lemmon Survey	·	1.3 km	MPC · JPL
557590	2014 WJ_{50}	—	October 14, 2001	Apache Point	SDSS Collaboration	(5)	1.3 km	MPC · JPL
557591	2014 WQ_{50}	—	October 24, 2005	Kitt Peak	Spacewatch	·	1.5 km	MPC · JPL
557592	2014 WC_{51}	—	April 1, 2003	Kitt Peak	Deep Ecliptic Survey	·	1.7 km	MPC · JPL
557593	2014 WQ_{52}	—	March 26, 2011	Haleakala	Pan-STARRS 1	·	2.7 km	MPC · JPL
557594	2014 WG_{53}	—	March 12, 2008	Kitt Peak	Spacewatch	ADE	2.0 km	MPC · JPL
557595	2014 WH_{53}	—	November 17, 2014	Haleakala	Pan-STARRS 1	·	1.7 km	MPC · JPL
557596	2014 WK_{53}	—	April 7, 2008	Kitt Peak	Spacewatch	L5	7.7 km	MPC · JPL
557597	2014 WN_{54}	—	October 26, 2005	Kitt Peak	Spacewatch	·	1.5 km	MPC · JPL
557598	2014 WQ_{54}	—	November 17, 2014	Haleakala	Pan-STARRS 1	·	2.4 km	MPC · JPL
557599	2014 WD_{55}	—	November 17, 2014	Haleakala	Pan-STARRS 1	(5)	1.2 km	MPC · JPL
557600	2014 WV_{55}	—	November 4, 2014	Mount Lemmon	Mount Lemmon Survey	·	1.4 km	MPC · JPL

== 557601–557700 ==
back to top

Designation			Discovery			Properties		Ref
Permanent	Provisional	Named after	Date	Site	Discoverer(s)	Category	Diam.	Ref
557601	2014 WY_{55}	—	October 8, 2008	Mount Lemmon	Mount Lemmon Survey	·	2.0 km	MPC · JPL
557602	2014 WB_{57}	—	October 18, 2009	Mount Lemmon	Mount Lemmon Survey	·	1.5 km	MPC · JPL
557603	2014 WC_{57}	—	November 22, 2005	Kitt Peak	Spacewatch	AGN	1.3 km	MPC · JPL
557604	2014 WD_{57}	—	November 1, 2010	Kitt Peak	Spacewatch	·	1.1 km	MPC · JPL
557605	2014 WQ_{57}	—	November 28, 2005	Mount Lemmon	Mount Lemmon Survey	·	1.3 km	MPC · JPL
557606	2014 WE_{58}	—	October 5, 2005	Kitt Peak	Spacewatch	·	1.3 km	MPC · JPL
557607	2014 WW_{58}	—	November 8, 2009	Mount Lemmon	Mount Lemmon Survey	·	1.4 km	MPC · JPL
557608	2014 WX_{58}	—	January 29, 2011	Mount Lemmon	Mount Lemmon Survey	HOF	1.9 km	MPC · JPL
557609	2014 WF_{59}	—	November 17, 2014	Haleakala	Pan-STARRS 1	·	1.7 km	MPC · JPL
557610	2014 WK_{62}	—	March 17, 2012	Mount Lemmon	Mount Lemmon Survey	·	1.5 km	MPC · JPL
557611	2014 WV_{62}	—	September 17, 2009	Catalina	CSS	·	1.5 km	MPC · JPL
557612	2014 WL_{64}	—	March 16, 2012	Mount Lemmon	Mount Lemmon Survey	·	2.0 km	MPC · JPL
557613	2014 WQ_{65}	—	October 15, 2009	Mount Lemmon	Mount Lemmon Survey	·	1.3 km	MPC · JPL
557614	2014 WA_{66}	—	November 10, 2010	Mount Lemmon	Mount Lemmon Survey	·	1.0 km	MPC · JPL
557615	2014 WJ_{66}	—	May 23, 2001	Cerro Tololo	Deep Ecliptic Survey	·	1.0 km	MPC · JPL
557616	2014 WL_{66}	—	October 2, 2014	Mount Lemmon	Mount Lemmon Survey	·	1.5 km	MPC · JPL
557617	2014 WO_{66}	—	October 25, 2014	Haleakala	Pan-STARRS 1	·	1.8 km	MPC · JPL
557618	2014 WF_{67}	—	September 30, 2005	Mount Lemmon	Mount Lemmon Survey	·	2.0 km	MPC · JPL
557619	2014 WK_{67}	—	August 6, 2005	Palomar	NEAT	·	1.5 km	MPC · JPL
557620	2014 WP_{67}	—	October 21, 2009	Tzec Maun	Shurpakov, S.	615	1.5 km	MPC · JPL
557621	2014 WZ_{67}	—	October 25, 2005	Mount Lemmon	Mount Lemmon Survey	·	1.5 km	MPC · JPL
557622	2014 WE_{69}	—	September 30, 2005	Mount Lemmon	Mount Lemmon Survey	·	1.6 km	MPC · JPL
557623	2014 WE_{71}	—	December 2, 2010	Kitt Peak	Spacewatch	JUN	920 m	MPC · JPL
557624	2014 WG_{72}	—	November 16, 2014	Mount Lemmon	Mount Lemmon Survey	·	1.3 km	MPC · JPL
557625	2014 WP_{72}	—	November 16, 2014	Kitt Peak	Spacewatch	·	2.3 km	MPC · JPL
557626	2014 WV_{73}	—	October 25, 2005	Mount Lemmon	Mount Lemmon Survey	·	1.4 km	MPC · JPL
557627	2014 WH_{76}	—	November 17, 2014	Mount Lemmon	Mount Lemmon Survey	·	1.4 km	MPC · JPL
557628	2014 WP_{78}	—	October 22, 2014	Mount Lemmon	Mount Lemmon Survey	·	1.4 km	MPC · JPL
557629	2014 WR_{81}	—	January 24, 2007	Kitt Peak	Spacewatch	WIT	750 m	MPC · JPL
557630	2014 WV_{81}	—	September 29, 2005	Mount Lemmon	Mount Lemmon Survey	·	1.4 km	MPC · JPL
557631	2014 WD_{82}	—	September 13, 2005	Kitt Peak	Spacewatch	·	1.2 km	MPC · JPL
557632	2014 WH_{82}	—	February 23, 2007	Kitt Peak	Spacewatch	AEO	1.1 km	MPC · JPL
557633	2014 WR_{82}	—	August 27, 2009	Kitt Peak	Spacewatch	(12739)	1.4 km	MPC · JPL
557634	2014 WQ_{83}	—	November 17, 2014	Mount Lemmon	Mount Lemmon Survey	·	1.3 km	MPC · JPL
557635	2014 WG_{84}	—	February 23, 2007	Mount Lemmon	Mount Lemmon Survey	·	1.5 km	MPC · JPL
557636	2014 WO_{84}	—	September 24, 2014	Mount Lemmon	Mount Lemmon Survey	GEF	1.1 km	MPC · JPL
557637	2014 WS_{84}	—	November 6, 2010	Mount Lemmon	Mount Lemmon Survey	·	1.1 km	MPC · JPL
557638	2014 WJ_{85}	—	March 28, 2012	Mount Lemmon	Mount Lemmon Survey	·	1.8 km	MPC · JPL
557639	2014 WQ_{86}	—	September 12, 2009	Kitt Peak	Spacewatch	·	1.7 km	MPC · JPL
557640	2014 WW_{86}	—	March 29, 2008	Kitt Peak	Spacewatch	·	1.4 km	MPC · JPL
557641	2014 WD_{89}	—	January 10, 2006	Kitt Peak	Spacewatch	KOR	1.3 km	MPC · JPL
557642	2014 WV_{89}	—	November 17, 2014	Mount Lemmon	Mount Lemmon Survey	·	1.4 km	MPC · JPL
557643	2014 WV_{90}	—	October 5, 2005	Kitt Peak	Spacewatch	·	1.2 km	MPC · JPL
557644	2014 WT_{93}	—	November 4, 2005	Mount Lemmon	Mount Lemmon Survey	·	1.5 km	MPC · JPL
557645	2014 WE_{94}	—	September 15, 2009	Kitt Peak	Spacewatch	·	1.4 km	MPC · JPL
557646	2014 WF_{94}	—	September 20, 2014	Haleakala	Pan-STARRS 1	·	2.0 km	MPC · JPL
557647	2014 WG_{96}	—	October 25, 2014	Haleakala	Pan-STARRS 1	·	1.5 km	MPC · JPL
557648	2014 WS_{96}	—	November 17, 2014	Mount Lemmon	Mount Lemmon Survey	·	1.4 km	MPC · JPL
557649	2014 WU_{97}	—	March 5, 2008	Mount Lemmon	Mount Lemmon Survey	·	1.5 km	MPC · JPL
557650	2014 WA_{98}	—	March 23, 2012	Mount Lemmon	Mount Lemmon Survey	·	1.2 km	MPC · JPL
557651	2014 WF_{98}	—	December 2, 2010	Mount Lemmon	Mount Lemmon Survey	·	1.0 km	MPC · JPL
557652	2014 WU_{100}	—	February 13, 2011	Mount Lemmon	Mount Lemmon Survey	·	1.5 km	MPC · JPL
557653	2014 WC_{101}	—	January 17, 2011	Mount Lemmon	Mount Lemmon Survey	·	1.5 km	MPC · JPL
557654	2014 WG_{101}	—	July 14, 2013	Haleakala	Pan-STARRS 1	·	1.5 km	MPC · JPL
557655	2014 WD_{102}	—	May 4, 2008	Kitt Peak	Spacewatch	·	1.5 km	MPC · JPL
557656	2014 WG_{102}	—	September 20, 2014	Haleakala	Pan-STARRS 1	·	1.5 km	MPC · JPL
557657	2014 WO_{102}	—	November 14, 2010	Mount Lemmon	Mount Lemmon Survey	·	1.3 km	MPC · JPL
557658	2014 WH_{103}	—	December 8, 2010	Kitt Peak	Spacewatch	·	1.9 km	MPC · JPL
557659	2014 WR_{103}	—	October 3, 2008	Kitt Peak	Spacewatch	·	1.9 km	MPC · JPL
557660	2014 WT_{104}	—	September 12, 2005	Kitt Peak	Spacewatch	·	1.2 km	MPC · JPL
557661	2014 WS_{106}	—	November 22, 2005	Kitt Peak	Spacewatch	·	1.9 km	MPC · JPL
557662	2014 WY_{106}	—	February 27, 2012	Haleakala	Pan-STARRS 1	·	1.3 km	MPC · JPL
557663	2014 WY_{107}	—	September 2, 2014	Haleakala	Pan-STARRS 1	(18466)	2.3 km	MPC · JPL
557664	2014 WJ_{108}	—	October 14, 2014	Kitt Peak	Spacewatch	·	1.0 km	MPC · JPL
557665	2014 WR_{109}	—	October 25, 2014	Oukaïmeden	C. Rinner	·	1.3 km	MPC · JPL
557666	2014 WY_{109}	—	September 19, 2009	Mount Lemmon	Mount Lemmon Survey	·	1.5 km	MPC · JPL
557667	2014 WD_{110}	—	April 22, 2012	Mount Lemmon	Mount Lemmon Survey	·	1.7 km	MPC · JPL
557668	2014 WZ_{110}	—	June 5, 2013	Mount Lemmon	Mount Lemmon Survey	·	1.1 km	MPC · JPL
557669	2014 WF_{111}	—	April 27, 2012	Haleakala	Pan-STARRS 1	·	1.2 km	MPC · JPL
557670	2014 WV_{111}	—	October 25, 2014	Haleakala	Pan-STARRS 1	AST	1.5 km	MPC · JPL
557671	2014 WQ_{112}	—	May 14, 2008	Mount Lemmon	Mount Lemmon Survey	·	1.4 km	MPC · JPL
557672	2014 WA_{114}	—	February 8, 2013	Haleakala	Pan-STARRS 1	PHO	1.2 km	MPC · JPL
557673	2014 WC_{114}	—	November 19, 2014	Mount Lemmon	Mount Lemmon Survey	EUN	1.1 km	MPC · JPL
557674	2014 WQ_{114}	—	June 3, 2014	Haleakala	Pan-STARRS 1	·	1.7 km	MPC · JPL
557675	2014 WS_{114}	—	August 29, 2014	Haleakala	Pan-STARRS 1	EUN	1.0 km	MPC · JPL
557676	2014 WX_{114}	—	October 4, 2014	Mount Lemmon	Mount Lemmon Survey	·	1.4 km	MPC · JPL
557677	2014 WG_{116}	—	January 14, 2011	Mount Lemmon	Mount Lemmon Survey	KOR	1.1 km	MPC · JPL
557678	2014 WF_{118}	—	March 12, 2007	Mount Lemmon	Mount Lemmon Survey	HOF	2.3 km	MPC · JPL
557679	2014 WZ_{119}	—	May 17, 2009	Mount Lemmon	Mount Lemmon Survey	L5	20 km	MPC · JPL
557680	2014 WM_{120}	—	November 19, 2009	Kitt Peak	Spacewatch	H	380 m	MPC · JPL
557681	2014 WD_{124}	—	June 27, 2011	Kitt Peak	Spacewatch	L5	10 km	MPC · JPL
557682	2014 WB_{127}	—	September 25, 2009	Kitt Peak	Spacewatch	·	1.3 km	MPC · JPL
557683	2014 WN_{128}	—	November 17, 2014	Kitt Peak	Spacewatch	·	2.6 km	MPC · JPL
557684	2014 WU_{128}	—	November 17, 2014	Kitt Peak	Spacewatch	GEF	1 km	MPC · JPL
557685	2014 WD_{129}	—	December 8, 2005	Kitt Peak	Spacewatch	AGN	990 m	MPC · JPL
557686	2014 WN_{135}	—	April 16, 2007	Mount Lemmon	Mount Lemmon Survey	·	1.8 km	MPC · JPL
557687	2014 WO_{138}	—	September 3, 2000	Apache Point	SDSS Collaboration	·	1.5 km	MPC · JPL
557688	2014 WR_{138}	—	August 12, 2013	Haleakala	Pan-STARRS 1	·	1.4 km	MPC · JPL
557689	2014 WP_{139}	—	August 17, 2009	Kitt Peak	Spacewatch	·	1.3 km	MPC · JPL
557690	2014 WT_{145}	—	November 2, 2010	Kitt Peak	Spacewatch	·	1.2 km	MPC · JPL
557691	2014 WO_{146}	—	October 28, 2014	Haleakala	Pan-STARRS 1	·	1.0 km	MPC · JPL
557692	2014 WA_{147}	—	August 31, 2014	Haleakala	Pan-STARRS 1	·	1.2 km	MPC · JPL
557693	2014 WK_{147}	—	March 2, 2008	Kitt Peak	Spacewatch	·	1.3 km	MPC · JPL
557694	2014 WC_{149}	—	November 24, 2009	Kitt Peak	Spacewatch	·	1.9 km	MPC · JPL
557695	2014 WN_{149}	—	October 10, 1996	Kitt Peak	Spacewatch	·	1.4 km	MPC · JPL
557696	2014 WP_{149}	—	October 22, 2009	Mount Lemmon	Mount Lemmon Survey	·	1.5 km	MPC · JPL
557697	2014 WH_{153}	—	January 23, 2011	Mount Lemmon	Mount Lemmon Survey	·	1.4 km	MPC · JPL
557698	2014 WM_{153}	—	October 12, 2005	Kitt Peak	Spacewatch	·	1.8 km	MPC · JPL
557699	2014 WU_{153}	—	November 17, 2014	Haleakala	Pan-STARRS 1	·	1.7 km	MPC · JPL
557700	2014 WG_{154}	—	September 27, 2005	Kitt Peak	Spacewatch	·	1.2 km	MPC · JPL

== 557701–557800 ==
back to top

Designation			Discovery			Properties		Ref
Permanent	Provisional	Named after	Date	Site	Discoverer(s)	Category	Diam.	Ref
557701	2014 WQ_{154}	—	October 22, 2014	Kitt Peak	Spacewatch	·	1.6 km	MPC · JPL
557702	2014 WN_{157}	—	October 24, 2014	Kitt Peak	Spacewatch	WIT	780 m	MPC · JPL
557703	2014 WW_{158}	—	May 1, 2012	Mount Lemmon	Mount Lemmon Survey	·	1.8 km	MPC · JPL
557704	2014 WA_{159}	—	December 8, 2010	Kitt Peak	Spacewatch	·	1.2 km	MPC · JPL
557705	2014 WV_{159}	—	January 28, 2011	Mount Lemmon	Mount Lemmon Survey	·	1.7 km	MPC · JPL
557706	2014 WM_{161}	—	April 20, 2012	Mount Lemmon	Mount Lemmon Survey	·	1.5 km	MPC · JPL
557707	2014 WW_{161}	—	March 27, 2012	Mayhill-ISON	L. Elenin	·	1.6 km	MPC · JPL
557708	2014 WZ_{163}	—	October 1, 2005	Mount Lemmon	Mount Lemmon Survey	·	1.5 km	MPC · JPL
557709	2014 WS_{164}	—	October 26, 2014	Mount Lemmon	Mount Lemmon Survey	NEM	1.9 km	MPC · JPL
557710	2014 WR_{165}	—	November 26, 2009	Mount Lemmon	Mount Lemmon Survey	·	1.9 km	MPC · JPL
557711	2014 WF_{166}	—	February 29, 2012	Kitt Peak	Spacewatch	WIT	1.0 km	MPC · JPL
557712	2014 WY_{167}	—	January 27, 2007	Mount Lemmon	Mount Lemmon Survey	·	1.4 km	MPC · JPL
557713	2014 WC_{168}	—	October 24, 2014	Kitt Peak	Spacewatch	·	1.2 km	MPC · JPL
557714	2014 WD_{168}	—	August 31, 2014	Haleakala	Pan-STARRS 1	(5)	950 m	MPC · JPL
557715	2014 WP_{169}	—	August 20, 2014	Haleakala	Pan-STARRS 1	·	1.6 km	MPC · JPL
557716	2014 WM_{170}	—	September 19, 2014	Haleakala	Pan-STARRS 1	H	420 m	MPC · JPL
557717	2014 WR_{170}	—	November 20, 2014	Haleakala	Pan-STARRS 1	PHO	930 m	MPC · JPL
557718	2014 WJ_{174}	—	September 19, 2014	Haleakala	Pan-STARRS 1	·	1.3 km	MPC · JPL
557719	2014 WM_{174}	—	November 1, 2010	Kitt Peak	Spacewatch	·	1.3 km	MPC · JPL
557720	2014 WT_{174}	—	October 9, 2001	Kitt Peak	Spacewatch	·	1.7 km	MPC · JPL
557721	2014 WZ_{174}	—	September 19, 2014	Haleakala	Pan-STARRS 1	·	1.8 km	MPC · JPL
557722	2014 WJ_{175}	—	February 28, 2008	Mount Lemmon	Mount Lemmon Survey	·	1.4 km	MPC · JPL
557723	2014 WV_{175}	—	June 7, 2013	Haleakala	Pan-STARRS 1	·	1.4 km	MPC · JPL
557724	2014 WE_{177}	—	December 3, 2010	Mount Lemmon	Mount Lemmon Survey	·	1.5 km	MPC · JPL
557725	2014 WY_{177}	—	October 2, 2014	Haleakala	Pan-STARRS 1	·	1.1 km	MPC · JPL
557726	2014 WE_{178}	—	October 1, 2005	Mount Lemmon	Mount Lemmon Survey	·	1.5 km	MPC · JPL
557727	2014 WG_{178}	—	June 18, 2013	Haleakala	Pan-STARRS 1	·	1.2 km	MPC · JPL
557728	2014 WF_{179}	—	March 15, 2002	Palomar	NEAT	·	2.0 km	MPC · JPL
557729	2014 WP_{179}	—	March 24, 2012	Mount Lemmon	Mount Lemmon Survey	·	1.4 km	MPC · JPL
557730	2014 WX_{179}	—	September 2, 2014	Haleakala	Pan-STARRS 1	·	1.1 km	MPC · JPL
557731	2014 WE_{180}	—	September 2, 2014	Haleakala	Pan-STARRS 1	·	1.0 km	MPC · JPL
557732	2014 WW_{182}	—	September 30, 2014	Kitt Peak	Spacewatch	AGN	900 m	MPC · JPL
557733	2014 WX_{182}	—	March 16, 2012	Mount Lemmon	Mount Lemmon Survey	EUN	1.0 km	MPC · JPL
557734	2014 WF_{183}	—	October 28, 2014	Haleakala	Pan-STARRS 1	·	1.4 km	MPC · JPL
557735	2014 WT_{183}	—	December 28, 2003	Socorro	LINEAR	·	3.2 km	MPC · JPL
557736	2014 WB_{185}	—	October 3, 2008	Junk Bond	D. Healy	·	3.1 km	MPC · JPL
557737	2014 WV_{186}	—	January 14, 2002	Palomar	NEAT	·	2.0 km	MPC · JPL
557738	2014 WU_{187}	—	July 4, 2013	Haleakala	Pan-STARRS 1	·	1.4 km	MPC · JPL
557739	2014 WK_{190}	—	February 25, 2007	Kitt Peak	Spacewatch	·	1.2 km	MPC · JPL
557740	2014 WL_{190}	—	September 20, 2014	Haleakala	Pan-STARRS 1	·	1.3 km	MPC · JPL
557741	2014 WF_{191}	—	September 20, 2014	Haleakala	Pan-STARRS 1	·	1.4 km	MPC · JPL
557742	2014 WP_{192}	—	May 3, 2013	Mount Lemmon	Mount Lemmon Survey	JUN	810 m	MPC · JPL
557743	2014 WQ_{192}	—	June 17, 2013	Haleakala	Pan-STARRS 1	·	1.5 km	MPC · JPL
557744	2014 WR_{194}	—	November 21, 2014	Mount Lemmon	Mount Lemmon Survey	·	1.5 km	MPC · JPL
557745	2014 WO_{195}	—	November 21, 2014	Mount Lemmon	Mount Lemmon Survey	EUN	1.2 km	MPC · JPL
557746	2014 WD_{196}	—	November 13, 2010	Mount Lemmon	Mount Lemmon Survey	·	1.1 km	MPC · JPL
557747	2014 WO_{200}	—	June 2, 2011	Haleakala	Pan-STARRS 1	H	430 m	MPC · JPL
557748	2014 WS_{201}	—	October 20, 2014	Kitt Peak	Spacewatch	H	350 m	MPC · JPL
557749	2014 WA_{204}	—	July 16, 2004	Cerro Tololo	Deep Ecliptic Survey	·	1.3 km	MPC · JPL
557750	2014 WD_{204}	—	October 24, 2003	Kitt Peak	Spacewatch	·	2.1 km	MPC · JPL
557751	2014 WO_{205}	—	May 15, 2005	Mount Lemmon	Mount Lemmon Survey	EUN	1.1 km	MPC · JPL
557752	2014 WV_{206}	—	March 29, 2012	Mount Lemmon	Mount Lemmon Survey	·	2.0 km	MPC · JPL
557753	2014 WW_{207}	—	October 27, 2009	Kitt Peak	Spacewatch	·	1.7 km	MPC · JPL
557754	2014 WT_{209}	—	September 26, 2009	Kitt Peak	Spacewatch	·	1.6 km	MPC · JPL
557755	2014 WE_{210}	—	January 23, 2011	Mount Lemmon	Mount Lemmon Survey	AGN	850 m	MPC · JPL
557756	2014 WO_{210}	—	November 17, 2014	Haleakala	Pan-STARRS 1	·	1.7 km	MPC · JPL
557757	2014 WD_{211}	—	November 17, 2014	Haleakala	Pan-STARRS 1	L5	9.9 km	MPC · JPL
557758	2014 WK_{211}	—	May 16, 2013	Mount Lemmon	Mount Lemmon Survey	H	430 m	MPC · JPL
557759	2014 WW_{211}	—	August 1, 2001	Palomar	NEAT	·	1.7 km	MPC · JPL
557760	2014 WG_{213}	—	September 15, 2009	Kitt Peak	Spacewatch	·	1.5 km	MPC · JPL
557761	2014 WB_{214}	—	April 4, 2008	Mount Lemmon	Mount Lemmon Survey	L5	9.2 km	MPC · JPL
557762	2014 WV_{214}	—	April 1, 2012	Mount Lemmon	Mount Lemmon Survey	·	2.0 km	MPC · JPL
557763	2014 WJ_{215}	—	October 25, 2014	Mount Lemmon	Mount Lemmon Survey	·	1.4 km	MPC · JPL
557764	2014 WN_{217}	—	September 20, 2009	Kitt Peak	Spacewatch	·	1.8 km	MPC · JPL
557765	2014 WP_{217}	—	September 18, 1995	Kitt Peak	Spacewatch	·	1.6 km	MPC · JPL
557766	2014 WT_{218}	—	November 26, 2005	Mount Lemmon	Mount Lemmon Survey	·	1.6 km	MPC · JPL
557767	2014 WJ_{219}	—	November 17, 2014	Mount Lemmon	Mount Lemmon Survey	·	1.6 km	MPC · JPL
557768	2014 WK_{219}	—	October 28, 2005	Mount Lemmon	Mount Lemmon Survey	·	2.0 km	MPC · JPL
557769	2014 WR_{219}	—	October 26, 2005	Kitt Peak	Spacewatch	MRX	820 m	MPC · JPL
557770	2014 WJ_{221}	—	August 20, 2009	Kitt Peak	Spacewatch	·	1.5 km	MPC · JPL
557771	2014 WL_{221}	—	May 12, 2012	Mount Lemmon	Mount Lemmon Survey	KOR	1.0 km	MPC · JPL
557772	2014 WS_{224}	—	July 13, 2013	Haleakala	Pan-STARRS 1	HOF	1.9 km	MPC · JPL
557773	2014 WW_{225}	—	March 27, 2011	Mount Lemmon	Mount Lemmon Survey	·	2.2 km	MPC · JPL
557774	2014 WE_{226}	—	September 21, 2009	Kitt Peak	Spacewatch	·	1.6 km	MPC · JPL
557775	2014 WR_{226}	—	November 6, 2005	Mount Lemmon	Mount Lemmon Survey	HOF	2.2 km	MPC · JPL
557776	2014 WJ_{228}	—	November 18, 2014	Haleakala	Pan-STARRS 1	·	1.5 km	MPC · JPL
557777	2014 WQ_{228}	—	June 17, 2005	Mount Lemmon	Mount Lemmon Survey	·	1.1 km	MPC · JPL
557778	2014 WD_{232}	—	October 25, 2014	Haleakala	Pan-STARRS 1	·	2.6 km	MPC · JPL
557779	2014 WE_{236}	—	September 25, 1995	Kitt Peak	Spacewatch	·	1.6 km	MPC · JPL
557780	2014 WT_{237}	—	February 1, 2012	Kitt Peak	Spacewatch	·	2.1 km	MPC · JPL
557781	2014 WD_{239}	—	September 20, 2014	Haleakala	Pan-STARRS 1	·	1.8 km	MPC · JPL
557782	2014 WX_{239}	—	April 23, 2011	Haleakala	Pan-STARRS 1	·	1.3 km	MPC · JPL
557783	2014 WQ_{246}	—	March 23, 2003	Apache Point	SDSS Collaboration	EUN	1.3 km	MPC · JPL
557784	2014 WV_{246}	—	October 14, 2001	Apache Point	SDSS Collaboration	ADE	2.2 km	MPC · JPL
557785	2014 WZ_{246}	—	July 3, 2005	Palomar	NEAT	·	1.6 km	MPC · JPL
557786	2014 WK_{247}	—	November 8, 2010	Mount Lemmon	Mount Lemmon Survey	·	1.6 km	MPC · JPL
557787	2014 WB_{248}	—	November 21, 2014	Mount Lemmon	Mount Lemmon Survey	·	1.6 km	MPC · JPL
557788	2014 WJ_{248}	—	October 28, 2014	Haleakala	Pan-STARRS 1	·	1.6 km	MPC · JPL
557789	2014 WR_{248}	—	December 26, 2006	Kitt Peak	Spacewatch	NEM	2.4 km	MPC · JPL
557790	2014 WN_{249}	—	October 17, 2010	Mount Lemmon	Mount Lemmon Survey	MAR	980 m	MPC · JPL
557791	2014 WX_{249}	—	May 31, 2009	Cerro Burek	Burek, Cerro	·	2.1 km	MPC · JPL
557792	2014 WH_{250}	—	January 17, 2007	Kitt Peak	Spacewatch	WIT	820 m	MPC · JPL
557793	2014 WK_{251}	—	March 29, 2008	Kitt Peak	Spacewatch	·	1.4 km	MPC · JPL
557794	2014 WS_{251}	—	September 17, 2009	Catalina	CSS	·	2.4 km	MPC · JPL
557795	2014 WE_{259}	—	October 3, 2014	Mount Lemmon	Mount Lemmon Survey	MAR	890 m	MPC · JPL
557796	2014 WT_{262}	—	July 18, 2013	Haleakala	Pan-STARRS 1	·	1.8 km	MPC · JPL
557797	2014 WZ_{263}	—	October 24, 2005	Palomar	NEAT	·	2.1 km	MPC · JPL
557798	2014 WN_{264}	—	August 28, 2005	Kitt Peak	Spacewatch	·	1.2 km	MPC · JPL
557799	2014 WT_{266}	—	July 1, 2013	Haleakala	Pan-STARRS 1	·	1.6 km	MPC · JPL
557800	2014 WT_{268}	—	January 23, 2006	Kitt Peak	Spacewatch	·	2.1 km	MPC · JPL

== 557801–557900 ==
back to top

Designation			Discovery			Properties		Ref
Permanent	Provisional	Named after	Date	Site	Discoverer(s)	Category	Diam.	Ref
557801	2014 WX_{269}	—	April 27, 2012	Haleakala	Pan-STARRS 1	·	1.4 km	MPC · JPL
557802	2014 WQ_{270}	—	January 2, 2011	Mount Lemmon	Mount Lemmon Survey	·	1.6 km	MPC · JPL
557803	2014 WQ_{272}	—	March 25, 2000	Kitt Peak	Spacewatch	·	1.8 km	MPC · JPL
557804	2014 WA_{273}	—	January 6, 2010	Catalina	CSS	·	2.6 km	MPC · JPL
557805	2014 WW_{274}	—	March 27, 2012	Mount Lemmon	Mount Lemmon Survey	·	1.6 km	MPC · JPL
557806	2014 WO_{275}	—	September 20, 2014	Haleakala	Pan-STARRS 1	·	1.5 km	MPC · JPL
557807	2014 WD_{276}	—	January 2, 2011	Mount Lemmon	Mount Lemmon Survey	·	1.7 km	MPC · JPL
557808	2014 WG_{277}	—	November 21, 2014	Haleakala	Pan-STARRS 1	KON	1.8 km	MPC · JPL
557809	2014 WH_{277}	—	November 21, 2014	Haleakala	Pan-STARRS 1	WIT	730 m	MPC · JPL
557810	2014 WA_{278}	—	March 26, 2012	Mount Lemmon	Mount Lemmon Survey	·	1.7 km	MPC · JPL
557811	2014 WD_{279}	—	September 30, 2003	Kitt Peak	Spacewatch	·	2.1 km	MPC · JPL
557812	2014 WK_{280}	—	September 29, 2009	Kitt Peak	Spacewatch	·	1.2 km	MPC · JPL
557813	2014 WD_{282}	—	November 21, 2014	Haleakala	Pan-STARRS 1	TEL	1.4 km	MPC · JPL
557814	2014 WB_{284}	—	September 22, 2014	Haleakala	Pan-STARRS 1	·	1.0 km	MPC · JPL
557815	2014 WG_{285}	—	November 21, 2014	Haleakala	Pan-STARRS 1	·	1.2 km	MPC · JPL
557816	2014 WU_{286}	—	November 21, 2014	Haleakala	Pan-STARRS 1	·	660 m	MPC · JPL
557817	2014 WB_{287}	—	November 21, 2014	Haleakala	Pan-STARRS 1	PAD	1.4 km	MPC · JPL
557818	2014 WE_{287}	—	September 28, 2009	Mount Lemmon	Mount Lemmon Survey	DOR	2.1 km	MPC · JPL
557819	2014 WR_{287}	—	March 5, 2006	Kitt Peak	Spacewatch	·	1.6 km	MPC · JPL
557820	2014 WY_{287}	—	February 7, 2006	Kitt Peak	Spacewatch	·	1.5 km	MPC · JPL
557821	2014 WO_{289}	—	March 27, 2011	Mount Lemmon	Mount Lemmon Survey	·	2.6 km	MPC · JPL
557822	2014 WQ_{290}	—	September 18, 2014	Haleakala	Pan-STARRS 1	·	1.4 km	MPC · JPL
557823	2014 WM_{291}	—	November 21, 2014	Haleakala	Pan-STARRS 1	MAR	880 m	MPC · JPL
557824	2014 WH_{294}	—	November 21, 2014	Haleakala	Pan-STARRS 1	·	1.6 km	MPC · JPL
557825	2014 WN_{294}	—	November 21, 2014	Haleakala	Pan-STARRS 1	·	1.4 km	MPC · JPL
557826	2014 WS_{294}	—	February 25, 2006	Kitt Peak	Spacewatch	·	1.9 km	MPC · JPL
557827	2014 WT_{294}	—	January 30, 2011	Mount Lemmon	Mount Lemmon Survey	·	1.7 km	MPC · JPL
557828	2014 WA_{295}	—	March 13, 2012	Mount Lemmon	Mount Lemmon Survey	·	1.9 km	MPC · JPL
557829	2014 WU_{296}	—	April 11, 2013	Kitt Peak	Spacewatch	·	1.2 km	MPC · JPL
557830	2014 WZ_{296}	—	December 8, 2010	Mount Lemmon	Mount Lemmon Survey	EUN	1.1 km	MPC · JPL
557831	2014 WD_{299}	—	March 13, 2011	Mount Lemmon	Mount Lemmon Survey	·	1.5 km	MPC · JPL
557832	2014 WJ_{299}	—	October 11, 2010	Mount Lemmon	Mount Lemmon Survey	·	2.1 km	MPC · JPL
557833	2014 WH_{300}	—	August 26, 2009	Catalina	CSS	·	2.5 km	MPC · JPL
557834	2014 WD_{302}	—	March 15, 2012	Mount Lemmon	Mount Lemmon Survey	·	1.4 km	MPC · JPL
557835	2014 WE_{303}	—	October 10, 2008	Mount Lemmon	Mount Lemmon Survey	·	2.8 km	MPC · JPL
557836	2014 WO_{306}	—	August 30, 2005	Palomar	NEAT	·	2.3 km	MPC · JPL
557837	2014 WX_{307}	—	April 20, 2012	Haleakala	Pan-STARRS 1	GAL	2.0 km	MPC · JPL
557838	2014 WK_{308}	—	January 23, 2006	Kitt Peak	Spacewatch	·	1.7 km	MPC · JPL
557839	2014 WV_{308}	—	November 22, 2014	Mount Lemmon	Mount Lemmon Survey	·	1.2 km	MPC · JPL
557840	2014 WZ_{309}	—	October 2, 2014	Haleakala	Pan-STARRS 1	·	1.1 km	MPC · JPL
557841	2014 WK_{310}	—	November 16, 2014	Mount Lemmon	Mount Lemmon Survey	·	1.8 km	MPC · JPL
557842	2014 WS_{310}	—	January 10, 2011	Mount Lemmon	Mount Lemmon Survey	·	1.2 km	MPC · JPL
557843	2014 WJ_{312}	—	October 15, 2001	Palomar	NEAT	·	1.8 km	MPC · JPL
557844	2014 WF_{314}	—	December 6, 2010	Mount Lemmon	Mount Lemmon Survey	·	1.3 km	MPC · JPL
557845	2014 WG_{314}	—	December 2, 2010	Mount Lemmon	Mount Lemmon Survey	·	1.7 km	MPC · JPL
557846	2014 WM_{314}	—	October 25, 2014	Haleakala	Pan-STARRS 1	615	1.1 km	MPC · JPL
557847	2014 WF_{316}	—	December 2, 2010	Kitt Peak	Spacewatch	·	1.4 km	MPC · JPL
557848	2014 WG_{316}	—	April 8, 2013	Kitt Peak	Spacewatch	ADE	2.0 km	MPC · JPL
557849	2014 WX_{316}	—	November 26, 2010	Mount Lemmon	Mount Lemmon Survey	HNS	910 m	MPC · JPL
557850	2014 WY_{316}	—	April 27, 2012	Haleakala	Pan-STARRS 1	·	1.5 km	MPC · JPL
557851	2014 WP_{318}	—	August 23, 2014	Haleakala	Pan-STARRS 1	·	1.7 km	MPC · JPL
557852	2014 WU_{318}	—	January 14, 2002	Palomar	NEAT	·	2.0 km	MPC · JPL
557853	2014 WA_{319}	—	January 15, 2007	Mauna Kea	P. A. Wiegert	·	1.0 km	MPC · JPL
557854	2014 WO_{319}	—	October 23, 2014	Catalina	CSS	H	510 m	MPC · JPL
557855	2014 WG_{320}	—	August 23, 2014	Haleakala	Pan-STARRS 1	·	1.7 km	MPC · JPL
557856	2014 WZ_{321}	—	October 28, 2014	Mount Lemmon	Mount Lemmon Survey	·	1.5 km	MPC · JPL
557857	2014 WX_{322}	—	November 22, 2014	Haleakala	Pan-STARRS 1	·	1.6 km	MPC · JPL
557858	2014 WZ_{323}	—	August 29, 2005	Kitt Peak	Spacewatch	·	1.2 km	MPC · JPL
557859	2014 WF_{324}	—	October 29, 2014	Haleakala	Pan-STARRS 1	·	1.8 km	MPC · JPL
557860	2014 WV_{324}	—	June 7, 2013	Haleakala	Pan-STARRS 1	ADE	1.6 km	MPC · JPL
557861	2014 WX_{327}	—	September 20, 2014	Haleakala	Pan-STARRS 1	·	1.1 km	MPC · JPL
557862	2014 WA_{328}	—	August 13, 2004	Cerro Tololo	Deep Ecliptic Survey	·	1.9 km	MPC · JPL
557863	2014 WC_{328}	—	March 13, 2012	Haleakala	Pan-STARRS 1	·	2.0 km	MPC · JPL
557864	2014 WQ_{329}	—	July 15, 2013	Haleakala	Pan-STARRS 1	·	1.3 km	MPC · JPL
557865	2014 WL_{330}	—	November 22, 2014	Haleakala	Pan-STARRS 1	·	1.5 km	MPC · JPL
557866	2014 WH_{331}	—	September 20, 2014	Haleakala	Pan-STARRS 1	·	1.5 km	MPC · JPL
557867	2014 WP_{331}	—	November 22, 2014	Haleakala	Pan-STARRS 1	·	1.2 km	MPC · JPL
557868	2014 WR_{332}	—	September 16, 2009	Mount Lemmon	Mount Lemmon Survey	·	1.7 km	MPC · JPL
557869	2014 WX_{334}	—	November 22, 2014	Haleakala	Pan-STARRS 1	·	1.7 km	MPC · JPL
557870	2014 WF_{336}	—	November 16, 2010	Mount Lemmon	Mount Lemmon Survey	·	2.1 km	MPC · JPL
557871	2014 WP_{337}	—	November 22, 2014	Haleakala	Pan-STARRS 1	·	1.8 km	MPC · JPL
557872	2014 WO_{338}	—	July 4, 2005	Palomar	NEAT	ADE	2.3 km	MPC · JPL
557873	2014 WA_{339}	—	November 11, 2001	Apache Point	SDSS Collaboration	ADE	1.5 km	MPC · JPL
557874	2014 WO_{339}	—	October 23, 2003	Apache Point	SDSS	·	2.9 km	MPC · JPL
557875	2014 WZ_{339}	—	September 22, 2014	Haleakala	Pan-STARRS 1	·	1.6 km	MPC · JPL
557876	2014 WQ_{340}	—	November 22, 2014	Haleakala	Pan-STARRS 1	·	1.2 km	MPC · JPL
557877	2014 WK_{341}	—	July 1, 2013	Haleakala	Pan-STARRS 1	EUN	1.1 km	MPC · JPL
557878	2014 WW_{341}	—	January 26, 2012	Mount Lemmon	Mount Lemmon Survey	·	1.2 km	MPC · JPL
557879	2014 WY_{341}	—	October 23, 2014	Kitt Peak	Spacewatch	·	1.7 km	MPC · JPL
557880	2014 WH_{342}	—	October 28, 2014	Mount Lemmon	Mount Lemmon Survey	·	1.5 km	MPC · JPL
557881	2014 WE_{343}	—	November 22, 2014	Haleakala	Pan-STARRS 1	·	1.6 km	MPC · JPL
557882	2014 WM_{343}	—	February 21, 2007	Mount Lemmon	Mount Lemmon Survey	·	1.5 km	MPC · JPL
557883	2014 WD_{347}	—	February 23, 2012	Mount Lemmon	Mount Lemmon Survey	·	1.4 km	MPC · JPL
557884	2014 WM_{347}	—	September 21, 2009	Mount Lemmon	Mount Lemmon Survey	·	1.7 km	MPC · JPL
557885	2014 WW_{348}	—	November 22, 2014	Haleakala	Pan-STARRS 1	EOS	1.7 km	MPC · JPL
557886	2014 WM_{349}	—	November 22, 2014	Haleakala	Pan-STARRS 1	·	1.7 km	MPC · JPL
557887	2014 WV_{349}	—	March 30, 2008	Kitt Peak	Spacewatch	GAL	1.6 km	MPC · JPL
557888	2014 WG_{350}	—	January 6, 2010	Kitt Peak	Spacewatch	TIR	2.5 km	MPC · JPL
557889	2014 WR_{350}	—	October 25, 2014	Haleakala	Pan-STARRS 1	GEF	1.1 km	MPC · JPL
557890	2014 WE_{351}	—	November 1, 2014	Mount Lemmon	Mount Lemmon Survey	·	1.9 km	MPC · JPL
557891	2014 WJ_{351}	—	November 10, 2014	Haleakala	Pan-STARRS 1	·	2.7 km	MPC · JPL
557892	2014 WZ_{352}	—	September 18, 2009	Kitt Peak	Spacewatch	·	1.6 km	MPC · JPL
557893	2014 WG_{354}	—	November 23, 2014	Haleakala	Pan-STARRS 1	·	2.5 km	MPC · JPL
557894	2014 WY_{354}	—	November 19, 2008	Kitt Peak	Spacewatch	·	3.6 km	MPC · JPL
557895	2014 WZ_{354}	—	November 23, 2011	Kitt Peak	Spacewatch	H	580 m	MPC · JPL
557896	2014 WM_{355}	—	October 4, 2007	Mount Lemmon	Mount Lemmon Survey	·	2.4 km	MPC · JPL
557897	2014 WU_{355}	—	September 12, 2007	Mount Lemmon	Mount Lemmon Survey	·	3.4 km	MPC · JPL
557898	2014 WX_{355}	—	November 23, 2014	Haleakala	Pan-STARRS 1	(1118)	3.0 km	MPC · JPL
557899	2014 WG_{357}	—	October 26, 2014	Mount Lemmon	Mount Lemmon Survey	·	1.6 km	MPC · JPL
557900	2014 WU_{359}	—	August 30, 2014	Haleakala	Pan-STARRS 1	·	1.6 km	MPC · JPL

== 557901–558000 ==
back to top

Designation			Discovery			Properties		Ref
Permanent	Provisional	Named after	Date	Site	Discoverer(s)	Category	Diam.	Ref
557901	2014 WF_{362}	—	November 26, 2014	Mount Lemmon	Mount Lemmon Survey	H	570 m	MPC · JPL
557902	2014 WG_{363}	—	December 12, 2006	Palomar	NEAT	H	620 m	MPC · JPL
557903	2014 WX_{363}	—	November 26, 2014	Mount Lemmon	Mount Lemmon Survey	H	670 m	MPC · JPL
557904	2014 WB_{364}	—	June 2, 2013	Nogales	M. Schwartz, P. R. Holvorcem	(194) · slow	2.1 km	MPC · JPL
557905	2014 WR_{371}	—	October 24, 2014	Kitt Peak	Spacewatch	·	1.5 km	MPC · JPL
557906	2014 WC_{373}	—	January 29, 2011	Mount Lemmon	Mount Lemmon Survey	·	1.4 km	MPC · JPL
557907	2014 WW_{374}	—	September 16, 2009	Kitt Peak	Spacewatch	·	1.4 km	MPC · JPL
557908	2014 WY_{375}	—	August 31, 2005	Kitt Peak	Spacewatch	·	1.1 km	MPC · JPL
557909	2014 WK_{377}	—	December 5, 2010	Kitt Peak	Spacewatch	·	1.8 km	MPC · JPL
557910	2014 WQ_{377}	—	August 27, 2013	Haleakala	Pan-STARRS 1	URS	3.4 km	MPC · JPL
557911	2014 WE_{378}	—	October 30, 2014	Mount Lemmon	Mount Lemmon Survey	·	1.1 km	MPC · JPL
557912	2014 WA_{379}	—	November 25, 2005	Kitt Peak	Spacewatch	GEF	880 m	MPC · JPL
557913	2014 WJ_{379}	—	September 24, 2009	Kitt Peak	Spacewatch	·	2.3 km	MPC · JPL
557914	2014 WO_{379}	—	October 25, 2009	Kitt Peak	Spacewatch	·	1.6 km	MPC · JPL
557915	2014 WW_{379}	—	July 16, 2013	Haleakala	Pan-STARRS 1	·	2.3 km	MPC · JPL
557916	2014 WO_{380}	—	November 2, 2010	Mount Lemmon	Mount Lemmon Survey	(5)	1.2 km	MPC · JPL
557917	2014 WL_{381}	—	October 26, 2008	Mount Lemmon	Mount Lemmon Survey	·	2.0 km	MPC · JPL
557918	2014 WZ_{381}	—	July 15, 2013	Haleakala	Pan-STARRS 1	EUP	2.3 km	MPC · JPL
557919	2014 WU_{383}	—	March 23, 2003	Apache Point	SDSS Collaboration	·	1.7 km	MPC · JPL
557920	2014 WY_{383}	—	October 25, 2013	Mount Lemmon	Mount Lemmon Survey	L5	7.4 km	MPC · JPL
557921	2014 WT_{384}	—	November 22, 2014	Mount Lemmon	Mount Lemmon Survey	·	1.9 km	MPC · JPL
557922	2014 WO_{386}	—	October 3, 2014	Mount Lemmon	Mount Lemmon Survey	EUN	890 m	MPC · JPL
557923	2014 WP_{386}	—	October 7, 2004	Kitt Peak	Spacewatch	·	1.6 km	MPC · JPL
557924	2014 WU_{387}	—	April 19, 2007	Mount Lemmon	Mount Lemmon Survey	·	1.8 km	MPC · JPL
557925	2014 WC_{389}	—	April 13, 2011	Haleakala	Pan-STARRS 1	TIR	2.6 km	MPC · JPL
557926	2014 WH_{389}	—	March 13, 2007	Mount Lemmon	Mount Lemmon Survey	·	1.6 km	MPC · JPL
557927	2014 WJ_{389}	—	February 13, 2007	Mount Lemmon	Mount Lemmon Survey	·	1.5 km	MPC · JPL
557928	2014 WO_{389}	—	December 27, 2003	Socorro	LINEAR	·	4.3 km	MPC · JPL
557929	2014 WN_{390}	—	October 8, 2008	Kitt Peak	Spacewatch	·	2.6 km	MPC · JPL
557930	2014 WN_{391}	—	January 11, 2011	Kitt Peak	Spacewatch	·	2.4 km	MPC · JPL
557931	2014 WS_{391}	—	July 15, 2013	Haleakala	Pan-STARRS 1	·	2.0 km	MPC · JPL
557932	2014 WS_{392}	—	July 19, 2001	Anza	White, M., M. Collins	·	1.6 km	MPC · JPL
557933	2014 WT_{393}	—	February 1, 2012	Kitt Peak	Spacewatch	·	1.4 km	MPC · JPL
557934	2014 WV_{393}	—	October 28, 2014	Haleakala	Pan-STARRS 1	·	2.6 km	MPC · JPL
557935	2014 WE_{394}	—	October 28, 2014	Haleakala	Pan-STARRS 1	·	1.4 km	MPC · JPL
557936	2014 WJ_{397}	—	December 17, 2009	Kitt Peak	Spacewatch	·	2.3 km	MPC · JPL
557937	2014 WR_{399}	—	October 22, 2003	Apache Point	SDSS	·	1.6 km	MPC · JPL
557938	2014 WS_{399}	—	July 18, 2013	Haleakala	Pan-STARRS 1	EOS	2.4 km	MPC · JPL
557939	2014 WW_{399}	—	November 25, 2014	Haleakala	Pan-STARRS 1	·	2.4 km	MPC · JPL
557940	2014 WY_{403}	—	November 26, 2014	Haleakala	Pan-STARRS 1	KOR	1.2 km	MPC · JPL
557941	2014 WE_{404}	—	January 30, 2011	Mount Lemmon	Mount Lemmon Survey	·	1.6 km	MPC · JPL
557942	2014 WJ_{404}	—	November 26, 2014	Haleakala	Pan-STARRS 1	TIR	2.0 km	MPC · JPL
557943	2014 WN_{405}	—	November 19, 2009	Mount Lemmon	Mount Lemmon Survey	BRA	1.1 km	MPC · JPL
557944	2014 WX_{405}	—	November 26, 2014	Haleakala	Pan-STARRS 1	·	1.4 km	MPC · JPL
557945	2014 WB_{407}	—	December 13, 2006	Mount Lemmon	Mount Lemmon Survey	·	990 m	MPC · JPL
557946	2014 WY_{407}	—	November 30, 2005	Kitt Peak	Spacewatch	·	1.8 km	MPC · JPL
557947	2014 WT_{409}	—	October 21, 2003	Kitt Peak	Spacewatch	·	1.9 km	MPC · JPL
557948	2014 WG_{411}	—	January 9, 2011	Charleston	R. Holmes	·	1.4 km	MPC · JPL
557949	2014 WY_{411}	—	November 26, 2014	Haleakala	Pan-STARRS 1	·	1.7 km	MPC · JPL
557950	2014 WN_{412}	—	October 18, 2009	Mount Lemmon	Mount Lemmon Survey	·	1.6 km	MPC · JPL
557951	2014 WY_{413}	—	April 13, 2012	Haleakala	Pan-STARRS 1	·	1.8 km	MPC · JPL
557952	2014 WE_{414}	—	March 2, 2001	Kitt Peak	Spacewatch	·	2.1 km	MPC · JPL
557953	2014 WR_{414}	—	December 18, 2003	Kitt Peak	Spacewatch	TIR	2.8 km	MPC · JPL
557954	2014 WG_{415}	—	December 2, 2010	Kitt Peak	Spacewatch	·	1.3 km	MPC · JPL
557955	2014 WV_{415}	—	November 26, 2014	Haleakala	Pan-STARRS 1	·	1.5 km	MPC · JPL
557956	2014 WE_{416}	—	November 26, 2014	Haleakala	Pan-STARRS 1	·	1.3 km	MPC · JPL
557957	2014 WJ_{417}	—	September 26, 2009	Kitt Peak	Spacewatch	GEF	960 m	MPC · JPL
557958	2014 WT_{417}	—	February 7, 2011	Mount Lemmon	Mount Lemmon Survey	·	1.3 km	MPC · JPL
557959	2014 WS_{418}	—	November 26, 2014	Haleakala	Pan-STARRS 1	·	1.6 km	MPC · JPL
557960	2014 WU_{418}	—	June 30, 2008	Kitt Peak	Spacewatch	·	1.8 km	MPC · JPL
557961	2014 WL_{420}	—	November 26, 2014	Haleakala	Pan-STARRS 1	·	2.2 km	MPC · JPL
557962	2014 WU_{421}	—	March 27, 2012	Mount Lemmon	Mount Lemmon Survey	·	2.0 km	MPC · JPL
557963	2014 WX_{421}	—	May 28, 2009	Mount Lemmon	Mount Lemmon Survey	·	1.0 km	MPC · JPL
557964	2014 WR_{424}	—	November 30, 2005	Socorro	LINEAR	·	1.8 km	MPC · JPL
557965	2014 WV_{424}	—	December 17, 1998	Kitt Peak	Spacewatch	·	2.3 km	MPC · JPL
557966	2014 WP_{426}	—	September 29, 2008	Mount Lemmon	Mount Lemmon Survey	EOS	1.8 km	MPC · JPL
557967	2014 WN_{427}	—	August 13, 2012	Haleakala	Pan-STARRS 1	·	3.6 km	MPC · JPL
557968	2014 WH_{428}	—	December 7, 2013	Haleakala	Pan-STARRS 1	·	2.8 km	MPC · JPL
557969	2014 WV_{428}	—	April 14, 2005	Kitt Peak	Spacewatch	EOS	2.1 km	MPC · JPL
557970	2014 WK_{430}	—	December 17, 2001	Socorro	LINEAR	·	1.6 km	MPC · JPL
557971	2014 WB_{432}	—	December 26, 2006	Kitt Peak	Spacewatch	·	1.1 km	MPC · JPL
557972	2014 WE_{432}	—	November 20, 2014	Mount Lemmon	Mount Lemmon Survey	·	2.8 km	MPC · JPL
557973	2014 WD_{433}	—	November 16, 2014	Mount Lemmon	Mount Lemmon Survey	·	1.6 km	MPC · JPL
557974	2014 WE_{434}	—	February 17, 2007	Socorro	LINEAR	·	2.0 km	MPC · JPL
557975	2014 WG_{434}	—	April 13, 2011	Mount Lemmon	Mount Lemmon Survey	·	2.5 km	MPC · JPL
557976	2014 WH_{434}	—	November 27, 2014	Mount Lemmon	Mount Lemmon Survey	·	2.3 km	MPC · JPL
557977	2014 WY_{434}	—	January 30, 2011	Mount Lemmon	Mount Lemmon Survey	·	1.5 km	MPC · JPL
557978	2014 WG_{437}	—	November 16, 2014	Kitt Peak	Spacewatch	·	2.0 km	MPC · JPL
557979	2014 WF_{438}	—	October 29, 2014	Kitt Peak	Spacewatch	·	1.3 km	MPC · JPL
557980	2014 WO_{438}	—	January 30, 2011	Mount Lemmon	Mount Lemmon Survey	HOF	2.0 km	MPC · JPL
557981	2014 WD_{442}	—	September 14, 2005	Kitt Peak	Spacewatch	·	1.2 km	MPC · JPL
557982	2014 WM_{443}	—	November 1, 2000	Kitt Peak	Spacewatch	·	1.6 km	MPC · JPL
557983	2014 WZ_{444}	—	March 9, 2007	Kitt Peak	Spacewatch	AEO	970 m	MPC · JPL
557984	2014 WW_{445}	—	November 27, 2014	Haleakala	Pan-STARRS 1	EOS	1.5 km	MPC · JPL
557985	2014 WJ_{446}	—	September 25, 2014	Mount Lemmon	Mount Lemmon Survey	·	1.5 km	MPC · JPL
557986	2014 WB_{447}	—	October 22, 2014	Mount Lemmon	Mount Lemmon Survey	·	1.7 km	MPC · JPL
557987	2014 WM_{447}	—	January 4, 2010	Kitt Peak	Spacewatch	·	1.8 km	MPC · JPL
557988	2014 WS_{448}	—	August 9, 2013	Kitt Peak	Spacewatch	·	2.0 km	MPC · JPL
557989	2014 WL_{452}	—	March 19, 2007	Mount Lemmon	Mount Lemmon Survey	GAL	1.5 km	MPC · JPL
557990	2014 WA_{453}	—	October 18, 2009	Mount Lemmon	Mount Lemmon Survey	AGN	1.1 km	MPC · JPL
557991	2014 WA_{455}	—	September 18, 2014	Haleakala	Pan-STARRS 1	·	2.6 km	MPC · JPL
557992	2014 WG_{455}	—	October 2, 2014	Haleakala	Pan-STARRS 1	·	1.0 km	MPC · JPL
557993	2014 WL_{457}	—	September 29, 2009	Mount Lemmon	Mount Lemmon Survey	MRX	1.2 km	MPC · JPL
557994	2014 WM_{457}	—	October 28, 2005	Kitt Peak	Spacewatch	·	1.3 km	MPC · JPL
557995	2014 WS_{457}	—	October 10, 2008	Mount Lemmon	Mount Lemmon Survey	LIX	2.0 km	MPC · JPL
557996	2014 WQ_{458}	—	September 17, 2009	Kitt Peak	Spacewatch	·	1.9 km	MPC · JPL
557997	2014 WD_{459}	—	October 28, 2014	Kitt Peak	Spacewatch	·	2.0 km	MPC · JPL
557998	2014 WS_{460}	—	September 16, 2009	Kitt Peak	Spacewatch	AST	1.4 km	MPC · JPL
557999	2014 WT_{460}	—	January 30, 2011	Kitt Peak	Spacewatch	·	1.5 km	MPC · JPL
558000	2014 WX_{460}	—	March 26, 2007	Mount Lemmon	Mount Lemmon Survey	AST	1.8 km	MPC · JPL

back to top

== Meaning of names ==
As minor planet discoveries are confirmed, they are given a permanent number by the IAU's Minor Planet Center (MPC), and the discoverers can then submit names for them, following the IAU's naming conventions. The list below concerns those minor planets in the specified number-range that have received names, and explains the meanings of those names.

Official naming citations of newly named small Solar System bodies are approved and published in a bulletin by IAU's Working Group for Small Bodies Nomenclature (WGSBN). Before May 2021, citations were published in MPC's Minor Planet Circulars for many decades. Recent citations can also be found on the JPL Small-Body Database (SBDB). Until his death in 2016, German astronomer Lutz D. Schmadel compiled these citations into the Dictionary of Minor Planet Names (DMP) and regularly updated the collection.

Based on Paul Herget's The Names of the Minor Planets, Schmadel also researched the unclear origin of numerous asteroids, most of which had been named prior to World War II. This article incorporates text from this source, which is in the public domain: SBDB New namings may only be added to this list below after official publication as the preannouncement of names is condemned. The WGSBN publishes a comprehensive guideline for the naming rules of non-cometary small Solar System bodies.

Named minor planet	Provisional	This minor planet was named for...	Ref · Catalog
557045 Nadolschi	2014 SQ_{314}	Victor Nadolschi (1911–1996) was a Romanian astronomer	IAU · 557045
557396 Crailsheim	2014 UO_{154}	The city of Crailsheim, founded in 1338 and is located on the river Jagst in southern Germany.	IAU · 557396
