= David Lewis-Williams =

South African archaeologist (born 1934)

David Lewis-Williams SCOB FRSSAf
- Lewis-Williams in 1999
- Born: 1934 (age 91–92); Cape Town, South Africa
- Education: University of Cape Town; University of Natal
- Known for: Rock Art Research that incorporates Ethnography; Shamanism and Neuropsychology
- Scientific career
- Fields: Rock art, Archaeology
- Workplaces: University of the Witwatersrand
- Thesis: Believing and Seeing: Symbolic meanings in southern San rock paintings

James David Lewis-Williams (born 1934) is a South African archaeologist. He is best known for his research on southern African San (Bushmen) rock art. He is the founder and previous director of the Rock Art Research Institute and is currently professor emeritus of cognitive archaeology at the University of the Witwatersrand (WITS).

== Theoretical influences ==
Lewis-Williams was exposed to social anthropology as an undergraduate at UCT. During this time he received lectures from renowned social anthropologist A. R. Radcliffe-Brown (who started the department of social anthropology at UCT in 1920 but later returned as a visiting lecturer) and Monica Wilson, a student of Bronislaw Malinowski. Malinowski’s ideas specifically concerning the association of ritual with social products meant that Lewis-Williams could eventually challenge the idea that San rock art was merely a narrative of everyday life. Thus, from the start of his career and in contrast to most scholars of the period, Lewis-Williams was looking at San rock art from a social anthropological perspective.

Following proofs of an article by South African scholar Patricia Vinnicombe, shown to him in 1966 by Professor Ray Inskeep (then editor of the South African Archaeological Bulletin), Lewis-Williams used a quantitative method for the analysis of rock art images in the Drakensberg. Overall he recorded some 4000 images for his doctoral thesis research. His PhD, finished in 1977 and later published in 1981 as Believing and Seeing: Symbolic meanings in southern San rock paintings., is regarded as a seminal text in rock art research globally.

The quantitative method now bears little impact on the understanding of meaning behind images in San rock art. There is simply too much ambiguity in what the numerical values can be said to imply.

In the early 1980s Lewis-Williams began to investigate other theoretical approaches. This was because he

began to feel a great disjunction between what [he] had learned as a social anthropology student and the then popular conception of San rock art as a childlike record of daily life with, perhaps, a few 'mythical' images thrown into the mix.

At that time in South Africa, during apartheid, Marxism was the 'language of liberation' and the only other social theory available. In The economic and social context of southern San rock art (1982), Lewis-Williams explored the economic position of the shaman in San society. Using Maurice Godelier's ideas of symbolic work, Lewis-Williams investigated the ritual role of shamans in terms of San social structure and the context of rock art.

Concerns for the other members of San society are seen in his research that draws on

structuration theory in an attempt to show how San individuals and groups of individuals manipulated social symbols in the creation and consolidation of personal power.

== Key research concepts ==
=== Ethnography ===
A foundation to Lewis-Williams's work has been the use of ethnography. As an undergraduate he was exposed to Isaac Schapera's The Khoisan Peoples of South Africa (1930) From the start of his professional career he drew on ethnography to address the meaning of San rock art. In 1968, he read philologist Wilhelm Bleek and his sister-in-law Lucy Lloyd's Specimens of Bushman Folklore, and later engaged with the manuscripts the archive of transcriptions of conversations with ǀXam-speaking San people from the 1870s. Although he never met her, Bleek's daughter, Dorothea Bleek, held a position in social anthropology at UCT where the archival collection is housed .

Other available ethnographic sources have been central in Lewis-Williams's work, particularly the accounts provided by Colonial administrator Joseph Orpen in an article published in 1874 about his conversations with a San guide named Qing, the words spoken to Marion Walsham How by the southern Sotho man called Mapote, and the Kalahari San ethnographies that developed from the work of the Marshall family and others during the 1950s and 1960s.

The 'trance dance, as practised by the Juǀʼhoansi in Botswana and Namibia in the twentieth century, has been at the centre of Lewis-Williams' arguments about shamanism and altered states of consciousness as the source of the images seen in southern African rock art. However, several researchers (including the artist Pippa Skotnes, the literary scholar Michael Wessels and the archaeologist Anne Solomon) dispute Lewis-Williams's interpretation of the important ǀXam San ethnographic texts that describe dances and healing

=== Shamanism ===
Shamanism, which derives from the Siberian Tungus word shaman, was used by Lewis-Williams to explain the metaphor of death that he alleges is common to both ethnography and San rock art. The shamanic world often has tiered realms inhabited by spirits that can be accessed through altered states of consciousness (ASC). The world inhabited by people is supplemented by other realms that are usually conceptualised as existing above or below the inhabited world. Shamans have the ability to mediate between these other worlds. For the San, other realms were accessed during altered states of consciousness, and at rock faces where rock art can be found:

everything created on it was in some way itself associated with the spirit realm.

More significantly, Lewis-Williams claims that the collection of San ethnography demonstrates the trance or healing dance, see San healing practices, is at the core of San belief, Metaphors for death are supposedly contained in the trance dance. As San shamans dance, their supernatural power, or ‘potency’, builds up until it reaches a breaking point and flies out of the body. At this point, they ‘die’, a metaphor for travelling to another realm where spirits dwell in the same way as the soul travels after leaving after physical death. However, there are methodological issues concerning the use of 20th century ethnographies, from peoples who did not make rock art, as analogous to interpret art elsewhere that is hundreds or even thousands of years older.

Lewis-Williams argues that the trance dance correlates with symbolism in the rock art. Features depicted in images that, it is argued, relate to altered states of consciousness, include nasal bleeding and the ‘arms back’ posture. Lewis-Williams and Megan Biesele (known for her work with the Juǀʼhoan people) showed that the gap between different groups of San and different traditions of rock art could be bridged because of similar terms and concepts centred around the dance used by both the ǀXam San in the south and the Juǀʼhoansi San people in the north. Building on the work of previous scholars such as Lorna Marshall and Daniel McCall regarding a 'pan-San' belief system, Biesele and Lewis-Williams together suggested that the conceptual linguistic terms and ritual observances similar to the Juǀʼhoansi and ǀXam could be used to understand the complexity of the images. Indeed, Lewis-Williams writes that

… there seemed to be no myth common to both corpora: the parallels lay deeper than surface narratives.

=== Neuropsychology ===
The idea of a conceptual belief system was expanded upon using neuropsychology. Together with Thomas Dowson, Lewis-Williams explored the relationship between universal neuropsychological patterns in the wiring of the human brain and practices in shamanistic societies. Using data produced from laboratory experiments with hallucinogens, they proposed a neuropsychological model with multiple stages of hallucinations experienced during altered states of consciousness. Simply put, the model demonstrates the relationship between altered states of consciousness and the subjective interpretation of hallucinations.

The premise of the neuropsychological model is that there is a difference between cultural imagery and neurologically produced visual patterns known as entoptic phenomena. During ASCs, which can be induced in a number of ways, the first stage of hallucination experienced by a subject contains only entoptic phenomena, such as the scintillating scotoma experienced by migraine sufferers. The second stage begins when the hallucinations are construed by the subject into culturally familiar content. The implication of this is that entoptic phenomena will be understood differently in different cultures. The final stage is one of deep visual and somatic hallucinations, with multiple images and sensations understood in a cultural context.

Despite being able to explain why geometric and representational forms occur together in much hunter-gatherer art worldwide, and providing a 'universal' link through human neurology if cultural differences are allowed, the model has been criticised. Critics have two concerns. First, the cross-cultural extrapolation of shamanism, and second, pushing this idea far into the past. In reply, Lewis-Williams holds to the neuropsychological model but emphasises that the idea of shamanism is not a simple analogy, it requires contextual definition. Furthermore, there is a need to have the idea behind the neuropsychological model practically demonstrated in further examples than the rock art of the San, Coso people and Upper Palaeolithic used in The signs of all times: entoptic phenomena in Upper Palaeolithic art (1988).

== Research in European caves ==
Lewis-Williams has studied much Upper Palaeolithic rock art in France since the 1970s. He argues that there are parallels between San rock and French Upper Palaeolithic rock art based on the neuropsychological model outlined above. In 1972, he met André Leroi-Gourhan (a French prehistoric archaeologist who worked on Upper Palaeolithic rock art) at a conference in Valcamonica, Italy. Leroi-Gourhan was working at Lascaux at that time and tried to arrange for Lewis-William to view the cave sites of the Dordogne. Unfortunately, they were unable to co-ordinate their dates and it was only much later that he visited Lascaux. With the help of scholars such as Jean Clottes (another French prehistoric archaeologist), he has been able to continue working with, and visiting, caves of the Franco-Cantabrian region, such as the famous Chauvet cave.

== Career timeline ==
- 1952–1955: Bachelor of Arts
- 1965–1965: Bachelor of Arts with Honours
- 1978–1978: PhD Believing and seeing : an interpretation of symbolic meanings in southern San rock paintings
- 1958–1962: Taught at Selbourne College
- 1963–1978: Taught at Kearsney College
- 1974–1975: Elected to Associateship of Clare Hall, Cambridge, United Kingdom
- 1978: Invited to join the University of the Witwatersrand by Professor David Hammond-Tooke
- 1978–1979: Appointed lecturer in Department of Social Anthropology
- 1980: Joined the Department of Archaeology
- 1 January 1981: Appointed Senior Lecturer
- 1 October 1984: Appointed Reader in Cognitive Archaeology
- 1986–2000: Appointed Director of Rock Art Research Unit
- 1 July 1987: Appointed ad hominem Professor of Cognitive Archaeology
- 1 January 2000: Appointed Professor emeritus
- 1 January 2000: Appointed Senior Mentor

== Select awards and achievements ==
- 1995: Distinguished Researchers Award (University of the Witwatersrand)
- 2000: Invited by President Thabo Mbeki to translate new South African national motto into the ǀXam San language
- 2003: Awarded James Henry Breasted Prize by The American Historical Association
- 2004: Award for Excellence in Archaeological Analysis, Society for American Archaeology
- 2004: National Research Foundation researcher grading: A1
- 2004: Awarded Honorary D.Litt. by University of Cape Town
- 2006: Awarded Honorary D.Sc. by University of the Witwatersrand
- 2010: Second National Research Foundation rating: A1
- 2015: Order of the Baobab (Gold)

== Selected publications ==
=== Articles ===
- Lewis-Williams, J. D. (1998). "Quanto?: The Issue of 'Many Meanings' in Southern African San Rock Art Research". The South African Archaeological Bulletin. 53 (168): 86–97. doi:10.2307/3889183. ISSN 0038-1969. JSTOR 3889183.
- Lewis-Williams, J. D.; Bardill, Patricia N.; Biesele, Megan; Yearwood, Stephenie; Clegg, John; Davis, Whitney; Groenfeldt, David; Inskeep, R. R.; Jones, Tim; Pretty, Graeme; Sauvet, Georges; Sieveking, Ann; Trbuhović, Vojislav B.; Van Noten, Francis; Vastokas, Joan M.; Walker, Nick (1982). "The Economic and Social Context of Southern San Rock Art [and Comments and Reply]". Current Anthropology. 23 (4): 429–449. doi:10.1086/202871. ISSN 1537-5382. JSTOR 2742269. S2CID 147504301.
- Lewis-Williams, J. D.; Dowson, T. A.; Bahn, Paul G.; Bednarik, Robert G.; Clegg, John; Consens, Mario; Davis, Whitney; Delluc, Brigitte; Delluc, Gilles; Faulstich, Paul; Halverson, John; Layton, Robert; Martindale, Colin; Mirimanov, Vil; Turner, Christy G.; Vastokas, Joan M.; Winkelman, Michael; Wylie, Alison (1988). "The Signs of All Times: Entoptic Phenomena in Upper Palaeolithic Art [and Comments and Reply]". Current Anthropology. 29 (2): 201–245. doi:10.1086/203629. ISSN 0011-3204. S2CID 147235550.
- Lewis-Williams, J. D.; Dowson, T. A. (1993). "On Vision and Power in the Neolithic: Evidence From the Decorated Monuments". Current Anthropology. 34 (1): 55–65. doi:10.1086/204136. ISSN 0011-3204. S2CID 144359478.
- Lewis-Williams, David J.; Clottes, Jean (1998). "The Mind in the Cave the Cave in the Mind: Altered Consciousness in the Upper Paleolithic". Anthropology of Consciousness. 9 (1): 13–21. doi:10.1525/ac.1998.9.1.13. ISSN 1053-4202.
- Lewis-Williams, J.D. (2002). "Three-Dimensional Puzzles: Southern African and Upper Palaeolithic Rock Art". Ethnos. 67 (2): 245–264. doi:10.1080/00141840220136846. ISSN 0014-1844. S2CID 145605832.
- Lewis-Williams, J. David; Pearce, David G. (2004). "Southern African San Rock Painting as Social Intervention: A Study of Rain-Control Images". African Archaeological Review. 21 (4): 199–228. doi:10.1007/s10437-004-0749-2. ISSN 0263-0338. S2CID 162624707.
- Lewis-Williams, J. David; Klein, Cecelia F.; Stanfield-Mazzi, Maya (2004). "On Sharpness and Scholarship in the Debate on "Shamanism"". Current Anthropology. 45 (3): 404–406. doi:10.1086/420906. ISSN 0011-3204. S2CID 224800194.
- Lewis-Williams, J (2006a). "Shamanism: a contested concept in archaeology". Before Farming. 2006 (4): 1–15. doi:10.3828/bfarm.2006.4.1. ISSN 1476-4253.
- Lewis-Williams, J. D. (2006). "The Evolution of Theory, Method and Technique in Southern African Rock Art Research". Journal of Archaeological Method and Theory. 13 (4): 341–375. doi:10.1007/s10816-006-9022-0. ISSN 1072-5369. S2CID 145379317.
- Lewis-Williams, J. D.; Biesele, M. (2012). "Eland Hunting Rituals among Northern and Southern San Groups: Striking Similarities". Africa. 48 (2): 117–134. doi:10.2307/1158603. ISSN 0001-9720. JSTOR 1158603. S2CID 144784086.
- Lewis-Williams, J.D. (2013). "Southern African Rock Art and Beyond: A Personal Perspective". Time and Mind. 6 (1): 41–48. doi:10.2752/175169713X13500468476529. ISSN 1751-696X. S2CID 162302899.
- Lewis-Williams, J. D. (2014). "Wrestling with Analogy: A Methodological Dilemma in Upper Palaeolithic Art Research". Proceedings of the Prehistoric Society. 57 (1): 149–162. doi:10.1017/S0079497X00004941. ISSN 0079-497X. S2CID 194103096.

=== Books ===
- Lewis-Williams, J. David (1981). Believing and Seeing: Symbolic Meanings in Southern San Rock Paintings. Academic Press. ISBN 978-0-12-447060-6.
- Lewis-Williams, D.J. (1983). The Rock Art of Southern Africa. CUP Archive. ISBN 978-0-521-24460-2.
- Lewis-Williams, J.D. (1986). "Paintings of power: ethnography and rock art in southern Africa". In Biesele, Megan; Gordon, r. (eds.). The Past and future of !Kung ethnography: critical reflections and symbolic perspectives : essays in honour of Lorna Marshall. Hamburg: H. Buske. pp. 231–273. ISBN 978-3-87118-780-3.
- Lewis-Williams, J. David (1990). Discovering Southern African Rock Art. D. Phillip. ISBN 978-0-86486-167-2.
- Lewis-Williams, J. David (1991). Bushmen: A Changing Way of Life. Penguin Random House South Africa. ISBN 978-1-86825-178-0.
- Lewis-Williams, J.D. (1996). "Harnessing the brain: vision and shamanism in Upper Palaeolithic Western Europe". In Conkey, M.W.; Sopher, O.; Stratmann, D.; Jablonski, N.G. (eds.). Beyond art: Pleistocene image and symbol. Berkeley: University of California Press. pp. 321–342.
- Lewis-Williams, J.D. (2001). "The enigma of Palaeolithic cave art". In Fagan, Brian M. (ed.). The Seventy Great Mysteries of the Ancient World: Unlocking the Secrets of Past Civilizations. Thames & Hudson. pp. 96–100. ISBN 978-0-500-51050-6.
- Lewis-Williams, D.J. (2002a). The Mind in the Cave: Consciousness And The Origins Of Art. London: Thames & Hudson.
- Lewis-Williams, D.J. (2002b). A cosmos in stone: interpreting religion and society through rock art. Walnut Creek, California: Altamira Press.
- Lewis-Williams, D.J. (2002c). Stories that float from afar: further specimens of 19th Century Bushman folklore. Cape Town: David Philip. ISBN 0-86486-462-0.
- Lewis-Williams, J. David (2003). Images of Mystery: Rock Art of the Drakensberg. Double Storey. ISBN 978-1-919930-06-0.
- Lewis-Williams, J.D. (2004). "Consciousness, Intelligence and Art: A view of the West European Upper Palaeolithic Transition". In Berghaus, Günter (ed.). New Perspectives on Prehistoric Art. Greenwood. ISBN 978-0-275-97813-6.
- Lewis-Williams, D.J., 2004. Building an essay: a practical guide for students. New Africa Books, Cape Town.
- Lewis-Williams, D.J., 2010. Conceiving God: The Cognitive Origin and Evolution of Religion. Thames & Hudson, London.
- Lewis-Williams, J.D. 2011. A pocket guide to San rock art. Jacana, Cape Town.
- Lewis-Williams, D.J. and Dowson, T.A., 1992. Rock paintings of the Natal Drakensberg. Natal University Press, Pietermaritzburg.
- Lewis-Williams, D.J. and Clottes J., 1996. Les Chamanes de la Préhistoire: transe et magie dans les grottes ornées. Paris: Éditions du Seuil. (English Edition: 1998, German Edition 1997)
- Lewis-Williams, D.J. and Blundell, G., 1998. Fragile heritage: a rock art fieldguide. University of the Witwatersrand Press, Johannesburg.
- Lewis-Williams, D.J. and Clottes, J., 1998. The Shamans of Prehistory: trance magic and the painted caves. Abrams, New York.
- Lewis-Williams, D.J. and Dowson, T.A., 1999. Images of Power: understanding San rock art (Second Edition). Southern Book Publishers, Johannesburg. ISBN 1-86812-196-8
- Lewis-Williams, D.J. and Clottes J., 2001. Les chamanes de la préhistoire: texte integral, polémique et réponses. Le Seuil, Paris.
- Lewis-Williams, D.J. and Pearce, D.G., 2004. San Spirituality: Roots, Expressions and Social Consequences. Double Storey, Cape Town.
- Lewis-Williams, D.J.; Pearce, D.G. (2005). Inside the Neolithic Mind: Consciousness, Cosmos, and the Realm of the Gods. London: Thames & Hudson.
- Lewis-Williams, D. J.; Challis, S. (2011). Deciphering ancient minds: the mystery of San Bushman rock art. London: Thames & Hudson.
- Lewis-Williams, D. J., 2016. Myth and Meaning: San-Bushman folklore in global context. UCT Press, Cape Town ISBN 9781775822059
