= Jean Clottes =

French prehistorian

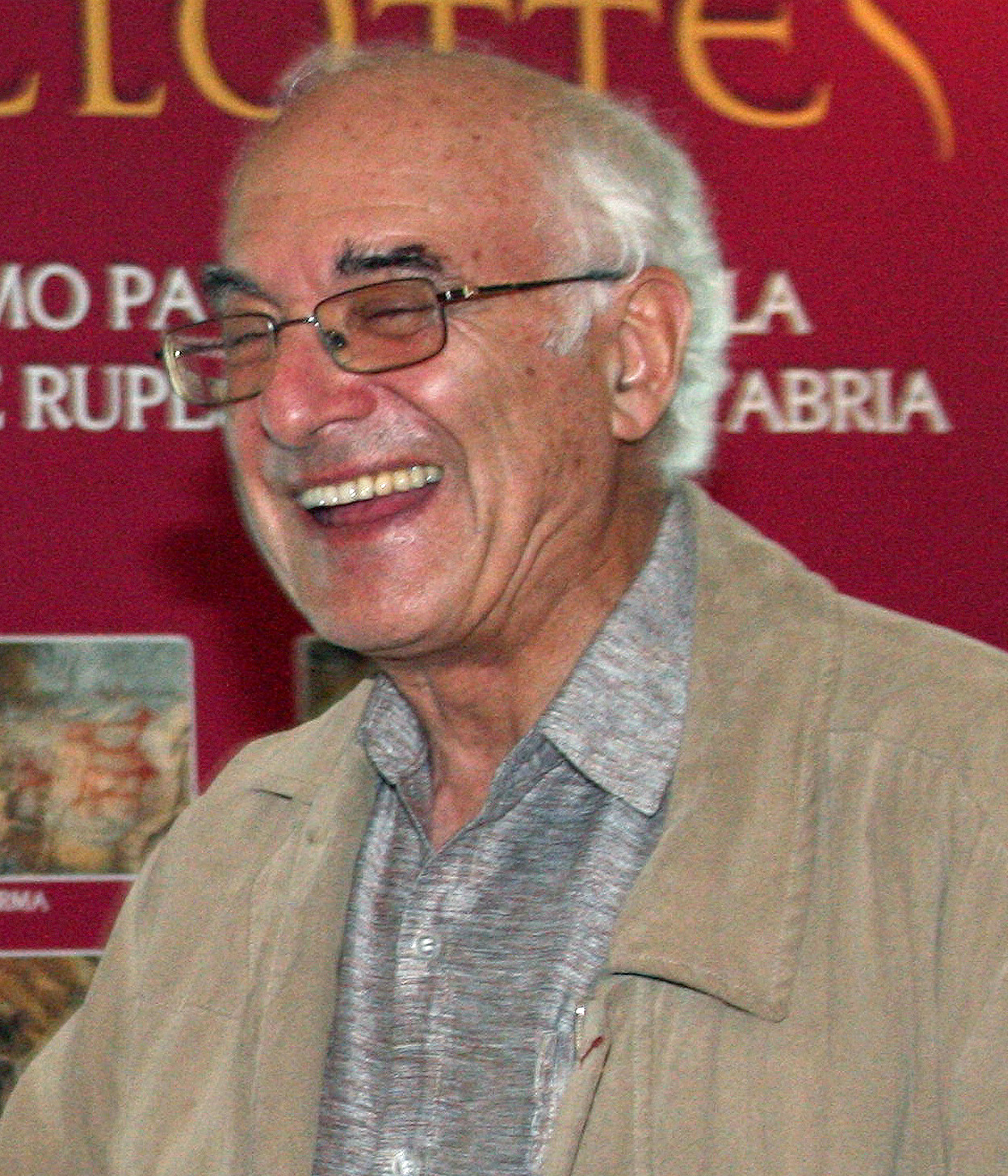
- Jean Clottes (2008)
- Born: 8 September 1933 (age 93); Espéraza, France
- Citizenship: French
- Education: University of Toulouse
- Known for: Cave art
- Scientific career
- Fields: Archaeology
- Workplaces: Ministry of Culture

Jean Clottes is a prominent French prehistorian. He was born in the French Pyrenees in 1933 and began to study archaeology in 1959, while teaching high school. He initially focused on Neolithic dolmens, which were the topic of his 1975 Ph.D. thesis at the University of Toulouse. After being appointed director of prehistoric antiquities for the Midi-Pyrénées in 1971, he began to study prehistoric cave art in order to fulfill the responsibilities of that position. In the following years he led a series of excavations of prehistoric sites in the region. In 1992, he was named General Inspector for Archaeology at the French Ministry of Culture; in 1993 he was appointed Scientific Advisor for prehistoric rock art at the French Ministry of Culture. He formally retired in 1999, but remains an active contributor to the field.

To date he has written over 300 scientific papers, and has edited, co-edited, written, or co-authored a total of over 20 books. He has also lectured around the world, taught at the University of Toulouse and the University of California at Berkeley, and engaged in numerous public outreach and professional service activities. He has received several honors from the French government and also from the Blue Tuareg people of the Sahara Desert, who made him an honorary Tuareg in 2007.

== Major prehistoric site discoveries ==
Clottes took a leading role in the study of two of the most famous prehistoric painted caves discovered to date: the underwater Cosquer cave, discovered in 1985 in cliffs at the shore near Marseille; and the spectacular Chauvet Cave, discovered in 1994. Radiocarbon dating showed that the paintings of Chauvet are approximately 30,000-32,000 years old, more than 2,000 years older than the next-oldest known cave paintings at that time. The revelation of Chauvet's beautiful and often highly sophisticated paintings was seen as a blow to theories arguing that art history is a story of "progress" from crude, clumsy beginnings succeeded by increasing levels of sophistication.

== Theory of prehistoric shamanism ==
Some of Clottes's most publicized contributions to the study of prehistory have come not in the form of field research, but in his efforts to propose a plausible theory of the psychological and social context in which prehistoric cave art was created. In 1994 he joined with South African anthropologist David Lewis-Williams to study prehistoric art in light of known neuropsychological phenomena associated with shamanic trances. Together they concluded that there is a strong argument for believing that much of prehistoric art was in fact produced in the context of shamanic practices. In 1996 they published their findings in the book Les Chamanes de la Préhistoire: Transe et Magie dans les Grottes Ornées (published in English in 1998 as The Shamans of Prehistory: Trance and Magic in the Painted Caves).

The book received heavy criticism from some other researchers, with some objections stemming from a reluctance to use modern ethnographic or psychological observations as a basis for speculating on the meaning of prehistoric art, following clumsy early-20th-century attempts to do so. Other experts found the ideas compelling, and suggested that academic infighting or jealousy may have played a role in the criticism. In response to their critics, Clottes and Lewis-Williams published an expanded version of their book in 2001 (Les Chamanes de la Préhistoire: Texte Intégral, Polémique et Réponses). David Lewis-Williams later went on to develop aspects of their thesis more fully in his own book The Mind in the Cave and its sequel, Inside the Neolithic Mind (co-authored by David Pearce).

== Published works ==
- Clottes, Jean (2016). What Is Paleolithic Art?: Cave Paintings and the Dawn of Human Creativity. Translated by Martin, Oliver Y.; Martin, Robert D. University of Chicago Press. doi:10.7208/chicago/9780226188065.001.0001. ISBN 978-0-226-26663-3. LCCN 2015029149.
- Clottes, Jean (2010). Los chamanes de la Prehistoria. J. David Lewis-Williams, Maria Angels Petit Mendizábal (1a. ed. en esta presentación ed.). Barcelona: Ariel. ISBN 978-84-344-6944-0. OCLC 758100934.
- Chauvet Cave: The Art of Earliest Times. University of Utah Press, 2003.
