= Inside the Neolithic Mind =

Book by David Lewis-Williams

Inside the Neolithic Mind: Consciousness, Cosmos and the Realm of the Gods
- Cover of the first edition
- Author: David Lewis-Williams and David Pearce
- Language: English
- Subject: Archaeology; Religious studies
- Publisher: Thames and Hudson
- Publication date: 2005
- Publication place: United Kingdom
- Media type: Print (Hardcover and paperback)
- Pages: 320
- ISBN: 9780500288276
- Dewey Decimal: 930.14

Inside the Neolithic Mind: Consciousness, Cosmos and the Realm of the Gods is a cognitive archaeological study of Neolithic religious beliefs in Europe co-written by the archaeologists David Lewis-Williams and David Pearce, both of the University of the Witwatersrand in Johannesburg, South Africa. It was first published by Thames and Hudson in 2005. Following on from Lewis-Williams' earlier work, The Mind in the Cave (2002), the book discusses the role of human cognition in the development of religion and Neolithic art.

The premise of Inside the Neolithic Mind is that irrespective of cultural differences, all humans share the ability to enter into altered states of consciousness, in which they experience entoptic phenomena, which the authors discern as a three-stage process leading to visionary experiences. Arguing that such altered experiences have provided the background to religious beliefs and some artistic creativity throughout human history, they focus their attention on the Neolithic, or "New Stone Age" period, when across Europe, communities abandoned their nomadic hunter-gatherer lifestyles and settled to become sedentary agriculturalists.

Adopting case studies from the opposite ends of Neolithic Europe, Lewis-Williams and Pearce discuss the archaeological evidence from both the Near East – including such sites as Nevalı Çori, Göbekli Tepe and Çatalhöyük – and Atlantic Europe, including the sites of Newgrange, Knowth and Bryn Celli Ddu. The authors argue that these monuments illustrate the influence of altered states of consciousness in constructing cosmological views of a tiered universe, in doing so drawing ethnographic parallels with shamanistic cultures in Siberia and Amazonia.

Academic reviews published in peer-reviewed journals were mixed. Critics argued that the use of evidence was selective, and that there was insufficient evidence for the authors' three-stage model of entoptic phenomena. Others praised the accessible and engaging writing style.

== Synopsis ==
In their preface, Lewis-Williams and Pearce explain their approach, and their reasons for comparing megalithic art and archaeology from the Near East and Atlantic Europe. They express their opinion that such comparisons are made possible – despite the cultural and geographical differences – because of the "universal functioning of the human brain" which unites all Homo sapiens and leads different societies to develop similar religious and cosmological beliefs.

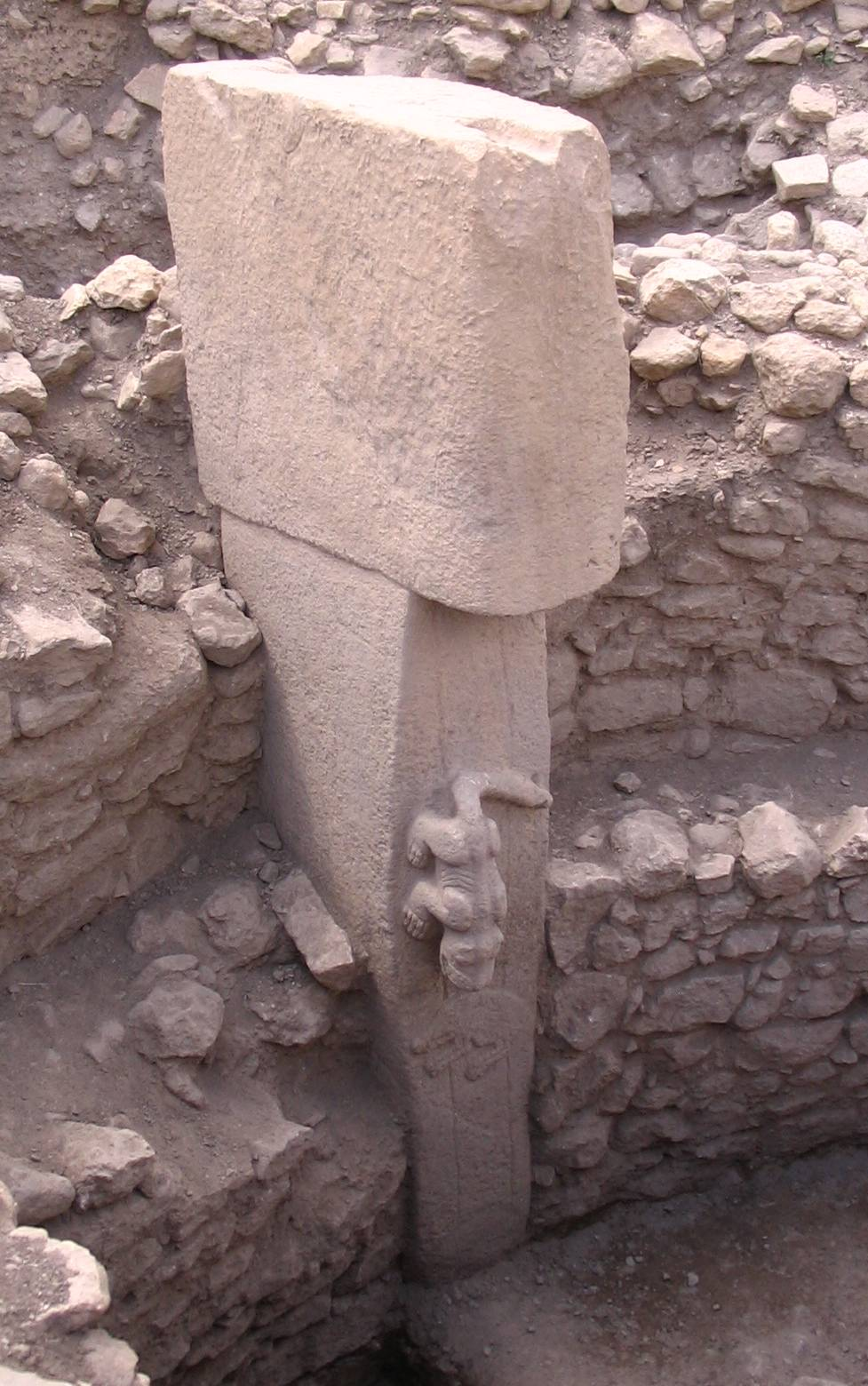
Monolith with animals in high and low relief from Göbekli Tepe.

Chapter one, "The Revolutionary Neolithic", explores the background to this period of time, in which humans became increasingly sedentary and developed agriculture. Discussing the various different understandings of the Neolithic advocated within archaeology, they propose that it should be seen as a "revolutionary" period than as "a revolution" in itself, in this way challenging the view made famous by V. Gordon Childe. Moving on to an exploration of why humans adopted agriculture, they proclaim their adherence to Jacques Cauvin's concept of the Symbolic Revolution. From there, they discuss the role of religion, suggesting that it should be understood as a tripartite system uniting experience, practice and belief. This leads to a discussion of some of the earliest archaeological evidence for the Neolithic, at Nevalı Çori and Göbekli Tepe, both in Southeastern Turkey, referring to the theory that the ritual beliefs practiced here resulted in the development of agriculture. Lewis-Williams and Pearce round off the chapter by quoting Samuel Taylor Coleridge's poem "Kubla Khan", written after an experience in an altered state of consciousness.

In the second chapter, "The Consciousness Contract", the authors explore such altered states of consciousness, beginning with a discussion of the life and work of Jean-Jacques Rousseau. Listing the symptoms of such altered states, they put forward their three-stage model for how the human brain experiences these states, and then interpret them as recognisable images. Chapter three, "Seeing and Building a Cosmos", proceeds to discuss early humanity's conceptions of cosmology, which the authors argue was probably divided into several tiered realms through which shamans were believed to traverse while in an altered state of consciousness. They follow this with a discussion of the shamanic symbolism of the eye, drawing comparisons with the eyes in the clay statues from 'Ain Ghazal and the plastered skulls from other Near Eastern sites. Chapter four, "Close Encounters with a Built Cosmos", examines two Neolithic settlements in the Near East – 'Ain Ghazal and Çatalhöyük – and argues that their layout and design may have reflected shamanistic conceptions of cosmology. In doing so, the authors draw parallels with the ethnographically-recorded Barasana people of Amazonia, whose maloca buildings were understood as cosmological microcosms.

In the fifth chapter, "Domesticating Wild Nature", the authors seek to explore how the people of the Neolithic Near East might have understood the concepts of "death", "birth" and the "wild", drawing on ethnographic examples from various recorded shamanistic societies in order to do so. Chapter six, "Treasure the Dream Whatever the Terror", discusses how aspects of consciousness and cosmology can make their way into myth, expanding on the problematic nature of defining "myth". Turning to the structuralist ideas of anthropologist Claude Lévi-Strauss, they discuss Lévi-Strauss's ideas of neurologically based "mythemes" that provided the building blocks for myths; although rejecting his structuralism, they concur that there is a neuropsychological "deep structure" behind mythology, and proceed to compare the Epic of Gilgamesh with a Samoyed narrative, "The Cave of the Reindeer Woman."

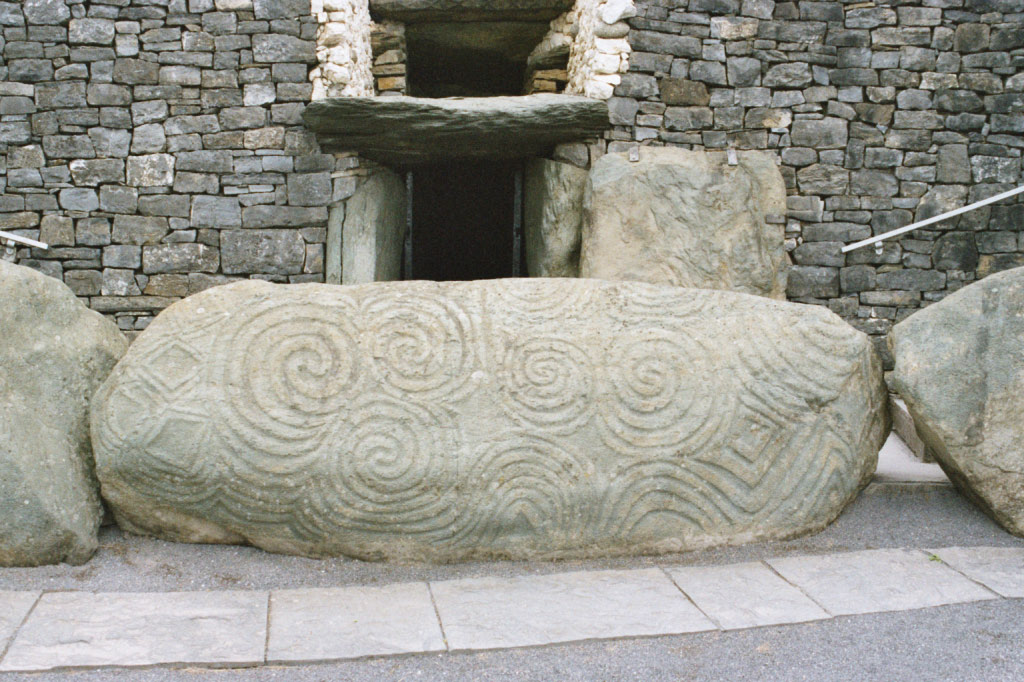
The entrance stone to Newgrange; Lewis-Williams and Pearce argue that these motifs represent entopic phenomena that have resulted from altered states of consciousness.

The seventh chapter, "The Mound in the Dark Grove", turns its attention to Atlantic Europe, on the western end of the continent. Opening with a reference to William Blake, the authors focus their attention on two Early Neolithic tombs on the island of Anglesey off the Welsh coast: Bryn Celli Ddu and Barclodiad y Gawres. Chapter eight, "Brú na Bóinne", examines the valley of the same name in County Meath, Ireland, the home to a number of Early Neolithic tombs. Lewis-Williams and Pearce turn their attention to the most prominent two, Newgrange and Knowth, arguing that their architectural designs reflect cosmological views of the world influenced by altered states of consciousness.

In the penultimate chapter, "Religion de Profundis", the authors examine a number of recurring features in Neolithic Western Europe which they believe can shed light on the religious beliefs of the period. Exploring ritual elements to the act of flint mining at such sites as Grimes Graves, they discuss the potential shamanic symbolism of quartz. From there, they look at the art motifs found at sites in this part of the continent, highlighting the argument of Dronfield that such motifs were an attempt to depict entopic phenomena, in doing so drawing ethnographic parallels with the artworks created by shamans among the Tukano people of Amazonia. The concluding chapter, "East is East and West is West", discusses the authors' views on the potential of their theory, making reference to Hawkes' ladder of inference and arguing for the need to consider emic perspectives when dealing with past societies.

== Reception ==
=== Academic reviews ===
Susan A. Johnston of George Washington University reviewed the book for the American Anthropologist journal, in which she noted that many of the authors' analyses were "interesting, and sometimes quite new and innovative." However, she also felt that there was a disconnection between the theoretical underpinnings to the tome and the analyses that followed; noting that while they were trying to avoid the neurological determinism which had been critiqued by Paul Bahn and Patricia Helvenston in their Waking the Trance Fixed (2005), she nevertheless thought their approach similar to it. Ultimately acknowledging that the analysis on offer do not require the neurological backing that the authors provide, Johnston suggested that the contemporary preoccupation with rooting archaeological interpretations in "biological reality" was a part of the "21st-century mind".

Chris Scarre of Durham University writing in Antiquity noted the controversial nature of the "three stages of trance" model, proclaiming that those already unconvinced by the Lewis-Williams' theory will get little from the new book. Scarre noted that there was "much to question and to applaud" in the work, before highlighting that the use of evidence was selective, and that the art on the Breton megaliths was not included. American Scientist published a review authored by Brian D. Hayden of Simon Fraser University, in which he described it as a "very enjoyable" book, praising the book's vignettes as making it "eminently readable". Although remarking that the authors' "endorse cognitive interpretations that are quite different from the more economic and practical interpretations that I generally favor", Hayden nevertheless commented that he agreed with their basic premise. He comments that while some of their assertions do seem plausible, others – for instance their claims that the idea of a tiered cosmos has a neurological basis – are less so, being the sort of "speculative indulgences" that he believes typify "English archaeology". Moving on to discuss the authors' views on the relationship between altered states of consciousness and power elites, he expresses his disagreement with them, noting that "the issues of domestication and the emergence of socioeconomic complexity are poorly served by cognitively based explanations."

David S. Webster of Durham University Archaeological Services reviewed the work for the European Journal of Archaeology in which he highlighted its "popular tone and style" and use of the "contentious" three mode-model of trance states, a model he dismisses as a "myth". In Archaeology, the publication of the Archaeological Institute of America, Michael Balter positively reviewed Inside the Neolithic Mind, praising its "superb writing" and "lavishly illustrated descriptions" of archaeological sites. Although he notes that most archaeologists would concur that Neolithic people probably believed in a spirit world, he expressed his belief that "they may balk at the idea" that the act of climbing down step ladders at Çatalhöyük symbolized the descent into the underworld or that hearths in the floors of 'Ain Ghazal symbolized the transformation of fire, rather than the remnants of cookery. He also noted that archaeologists would be more receptive to their idea that geometric patterns on European megaliths have parallels with similarities in Southern Africa and California. Concluding his review, Balter remarked that the authors "can be assured that their foray into the Neolithic mind will not be ignored."
