= Department of Entomology, National Museum of Natural History =

Department of the Smithsonian's National Museum of Natural History

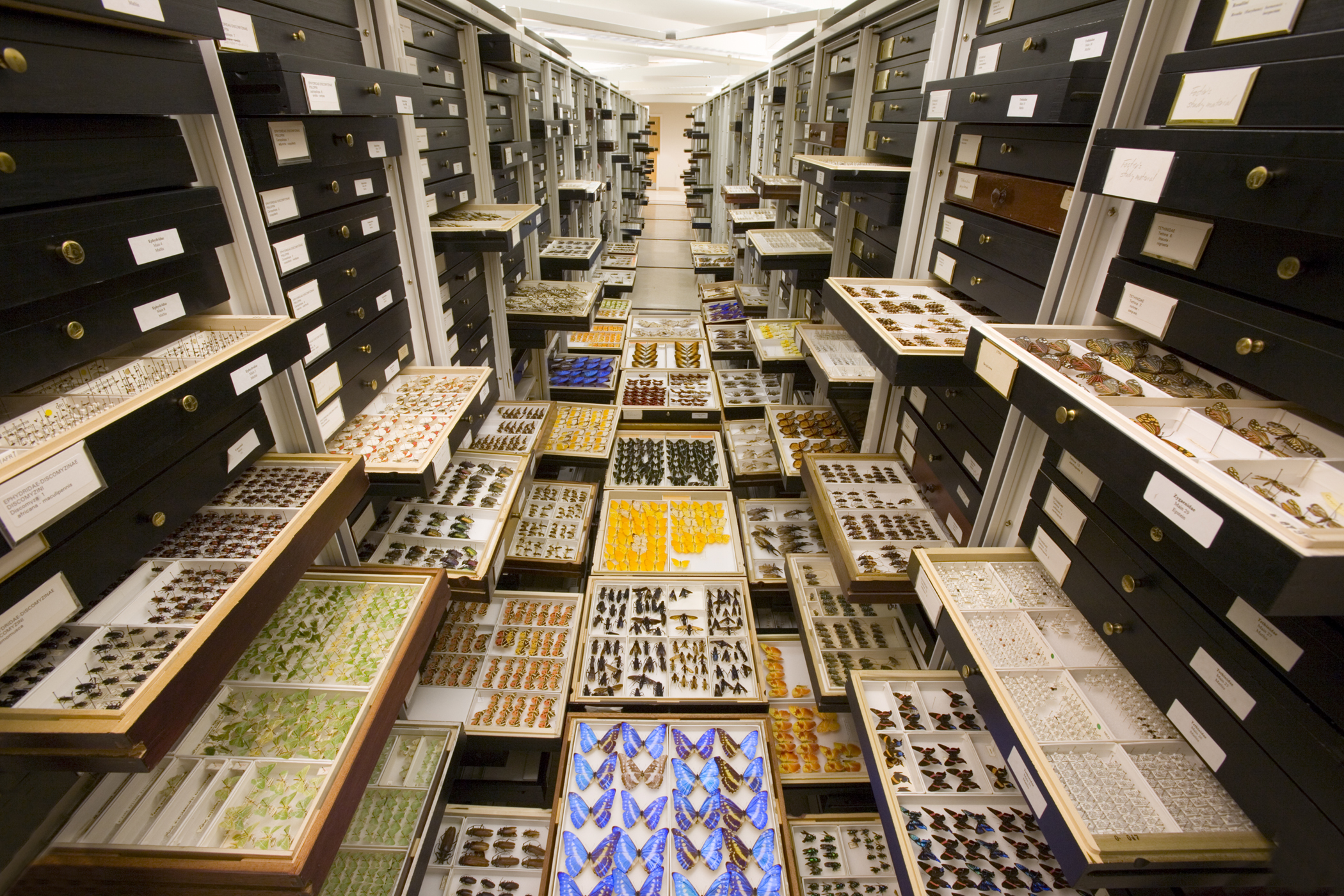
Open cabinets highlighting Department of Entomology collections at the National Museum of Natural History. Photo by Chip Clark.

The Department of Entomology is a research department and collection unit of the Smithsonian Institution's National Museum of Natural History (NMNH), located in Washington, D.C. The department houses the U.S. National Entomological Collection, one of the largest entomological collections in the world, with over 35 million specimens housed in 132,354 drawers, 33,000 jars or vials, and 23,000 slides in more than 5,200 cabinets. The department also includes research scientists and technical staff from the Smithsonian Institution, the U.S. Department of Agriculture (USDA) Systematic Entomology Lab (SEL) and USDA APHIS National Identification Services, and U.S. Department of Defense (DoD) Walter Reed Biosystematics Unit (WRBU; decommissioned in 2025).

== History ==
Prior to 1862, the U.S. government's entomological work for agriculture was handled by the United States Patent Office. With the establishment of the United States Department of Agriculture (USDA) in 1862, the responsibility was transferred to the newly appointed USDA Chief Entomologist, Townend Glover. When he retired in 1877, he was succeeded by Charles Valentine Riley, who resigned in 1879 after a personal disagreement and was replaced with John Henry Comstock. Riley was reinstated as USDA Chief Entomologist in 1881, and was then also appointed Honorary Curator of the newly created Division of Insects at the United States National Museum (USNM). Although the USNM had been established in 1842, four years before the founding of the Smithsonian Institution, insufficient funding at the time led to the Smithsonian's insect collection being distributed to collaborating scientists, with the understanding that the material could be reclaimed.

In the 1870s, the USDA became the repository for the Smithsonian insect collection, which was added to the USDA collection. Upon Riley's appointment as Honorary Curator, the USDA insect collection was officially transferred to the USNM. The first salaried Smithsonian entomologist was the lepidopterist John B. Smith, who served as assistant curator from 1885 to April 1889. With the donation of Riley's personal collection (by Riley's account, 115,000 pinned specimens, 2,850 vials of alcohol material, and 3,000 slides of minute insects, for an estimated total of 150,000 specimens and 20,000 species) in 1886, the USNM insect collection achieved status as a major entomological depository. Riley was succeeded as USDA Chief Entomologist and Honorary Curator by Leland Ossian Howard, who served until 1927. Howard was responsible for building the USDA's entomological workforce into a national network of specialists in basic and applied insect science, including the appointment of USDA staff as custodians in the national insect collection (D. W. Coquillet in Diptera, W. H. Ashmead in Hymenoptera, E. A. Schwarz in Coleoptera, H. G. Dyar in Lepidoptera, Nathan Banks in Aarachnida, and O. F. Cook in myriapods). In 1925, taxonomic work was established as a separate division of the Bureau of Entomology within USDA. This division underwent a series of name changes and reorganizations before becoming the Systematic Entomology Laboratory in 1967. Systematists from the Department of Defense (the Walter Reed Biosystematics Unit) joined in 1961 because of the impact of mosquito-borne disease on national defense and public health, an affiliation that was terminated in 2025. The extensive collection of mosquitoes and other blood-feeding flies remains in the Smithsonian. USDA APHIS National Taxonomists were embedded in the SI Entomology collections in 2018, specializing in Diptera, Lepidoptera, Hemiptera and Coleoptera.

== Collections ==
The U.S. National Insect Collection is the second largest insect collection in the world, with approximately 35 million specimens representing over 300,000 species. The collection includes over 100,000 holotypes and many additional paratypes and secondary types. The size and quality of the Nearctic and Neotropical collections are unparalleled, but there are specimens from all over the world, with especially strong representation from Sri Lanka, the Philippines, and Papua New Guinea. The specimens represent approximately 60% of the known insect families, with especially strong collections of butterflies and moths, flies, mosquitoes, beetles, and wasps. The majority of the collection is pinned or point-mounted and stored dry in drawers, but there are also many specimens housed in alcohol, on slides, and in envelopes.

The entomological collections are primarily housed at the National Museum of Natural History in downtown Washington, D.C. (80%), and the NMNH Museum Support Center (MSC) in Suitland, Maryland (20%). The collections are loaned to qualified scientists and students around the world, and the department hosts visiting scientists who come to study the collections on-site. The department also houses the Entomology Illustration Archives, approximately 6000 illustrations originally created to support the department's research and publications but now housed and conserved separately as historically significant art objects. Recently, the Department of Entomology has also established a non-illustration archive for physical objects, field and laboratory research notebooks and materials, and for correspondence of entomology researchers and staff based at the NMNH from all three agencies, as well as similar items accompanying donated collections.

== Staff ==
As of 2026, the combined Department of Entomology (including SI, and USDA,) employs about 55 permanent full-time staff members and a variable number of contractors, research associates, postdoctoral and predoctoral fellows, students, and volunteers. The Smithsonian entomology staff includes 19 staff members, located at both the NMNH and the MSC in Suitland, MD. The USDA SEL entomology staff includes 20 staff members, located at both the NMNH and the BARC in Beltsville, MD, USDA APHIS National Identification Services has 14 entomological staff members embedded in the NMNH.

== Outreach and education ==
The department supports and collaborates in the "Butterflies + Plants: Partners in Evolution" exhibit, indoor butterfly pavilion and outdoor butterfly habitat garden, the O. Orkin Insect Zoo, and the Q?rius learning center, all located in or around the National Museum of Natural History. The Entomological Society of Washington sponsors an outreach program, The Young Entomologist Group, that provides monthly indoor and outdoor programs in natural history to young children. In addition, staff participate in "The Scientist is In" activities in the exhibits areas, engage small- and medium-sized audiences at local and regional events, provide interviews for various media outlets, and guide tours to visitors interested in going "Behind-the-scenes".
