= San healing practices =

Healing practices used by the various San people

In the cultures of the various San or Bushman peoples, healers administer a wide range of practices, from oral remedies containing plant and animal material, making cuts on the body and rubbing in 'potent' substances, inhaling smoke of smoldering organic matter like certain twigs or animal dung, wearing parts of animals or 'jewelry' that 'makes them strong.' Anecdotal records reveal that the Khoikhoi and San people have used Sceletium tortuosum since ancient times as an essential part of the indigenous culture and materia medica. The trance dance is one of the most distinctive features of San culture.

San people perform all-night trance dances, or healing dances, in which rhythmic singing, drumming, and dancing activate what is described as a spiritual energy called n/um; this leads healers, often men, into a state called !kia. In !kia, healers are described as perceiving and removing sickness, mending social conflicts, and undertaking spiritual journeys beyond ordinary perception through the use of precise hand movements, vocalizations, and ritualized actions. These dances are physically and emotionally intense. Dancers are trained from childhood.

== Trance dance ==
The San heal whilst in an altered state of consciousness in what is known as a 'trance dance' or 'healing dance'. Trance dance rituals take place over an entire night. Participants will sometimes tie offerings to animal spirits to the trees, and will use drums in order to contact animal and ancestor spirits.

Richard Katz, an associate professor from Harvard University, says these occur four times a month, on average. In her book The Harmless People, based on fieldwork in the 1950s, Elizabeth Marshall Thomas observed that the women sat in a circle around a fire, singing the medicine songs in several parts with falsetto voices and clapping their hands in a sharp, staccato rhythm. Men danced single-file around the fire taking very short, pounding steps in counterpoint to the rhythms of the singing and the clapping. The movement was accompanied by the sharp, high clatter of rattles—made from dry cocoons strung together with sinew cords—that were tied to their legs. The dance was a complicated pattern of voices and rhythms that was infinitely varied and precise. San people began learning these songs and dances when they were children and work hard to develop these skills.

== Healing energy ==
Lorna Marshall, mother of Elizabeth Marshall Thomas, conducted six expeditions to the Kalahari in the 1950s for the purpose of studying the San. She wrote that as the dance intensified, the n/um, or energy, was thought to be activated in the bodies of those who heal (most were men). The n/um is so strong it can become dangerous. Healers experiencing this must not point their finger fixedly at anyone, especially a child, because a "fight" or "death thing" might go along their arm, leap into the child, and kill it. Katz says the women's singing of these powerful n/um songs helps "awaken" the n/um and the healer's heart so they can begin to heal. The healer undergoes a transformation, which comes after a painful transition into an enhanced state of consciousness, called !kia. This connects the healer and their spiritual healing power with the community. When dancers are experiencing !kia, they can heal all those at the dance. !kia is considered a very special and extraordinary state.

The process of intensifying n/um and going into !kia can manifest itself in different ways. Isaacson says, "they sometimes dance themselves into a trance, sometimes screaming in pain, and other times laughing or singing." They can also suddenly fling their arms into the air and with a piercing shriek crash to the ground, as observed by Elizabeth Marshall. The transformation experience was described to Richard Katz by an experienced healer, Kinachau, in the following quote:

"You dance, dance, dance. Then n/um lifts you up in your belly and lifts you in your back, and then you start to shiver. [N/um] makes you tremble, it's hot. . . . Your eyes are open but you don't look around; you hold your eyes still and look straight ahead. But when you get into !kia, you're looking around because you see everything, because you see what's troubling everybody . . . n/um enters every part of your body right to the tip of your feet and even your hair."

Katz also states that in order to cure, people must learn to control their boiling n/um and to "pull out sickness" from the people. When they do this, they use the enhanced consciousness of !kia to see the things causing sickness, like "the death things God has put into the people." According to Elizabeth Marshall Thomas, the healer will begin by washing his hands in the fire. He then will place one hand on the person's chest, and one on their back, and will "suck" the evil from them. The medicine man often shudders and groans as he does this, and then will suddenly "shriek the evil into the air." Katz states that if the person they are healing has a specific symptom, the healers' hands focus on sucking the evil from that area, but if there are no symptoms of illness the healers' fluttering and vibrating hands move lightly and sporadically over the person's chest.

These happenings go on throughout the entire night. Elizabeth Marshall says people get tired, but they will not stop, because it is important to keep going until sunrise. Sometimes the younger people might have to leave the dance circle, but the older people never falter. When the first light of dawn shows on the horizon, they gather extra energy to will sing louder and dance faster. As the sun rises, the dance reaches a "final most powerful intensity", and then will suddenly stop. Sandy Gall, author of The Bushmen of Southern Africa, states that after a healing dance they "collapse in exhaustion" until the next day, when, fully recovered, they share their trance experiences with one another.

== Other occurrences at healing dances ==
San healers do not just cure physical illness. In The Old Way: A Story of the First People (2006), Marshall Thomas reports that they expel what they call "star sickness". This is the force that takes over a group of people and causes jealousy, anger and quarrels and failures of gift giving. These things are thought to pull people apart and damage unity. Trance dancing mends the social fabric as it releases hostility, according to Katz.

Also in this powerful state, healers often walk on fire, see the insides of peoples' bodies and scenes at great distances from their camp, or travel to God's home, as observed by Elizabeth Marshall. One healer tells of a time when his spirit left the camp and came upon a pride of lions that had been troubling the people. The man's spirit ordered them away, and they left and did not bother the people anymore. These activities would never be attempted in their ordinary state.

These dances and !kia may also contribute to the healer's sense of self. As K"au fDau, a blind healer told Professor Katz:

"God keeps my eyeballs in a little cloth bag. When he first collected them, he got a little cloth bag and plucked my eyeballs out and put them into the bag and then he tied the eyeballs to his belt and went up to heaven. And now when I dance, on the nights when I dance and the singing rises up, he comes down from heaven swinging the bag with the eyeballs above my head and then he lowers the eyeballs to my eye level, and as the singing gets strong, he puts the eyeballs into my sockets and they stay there and I cure. And then when the women stop singing and separate out, he removes the eyeballs, puts them back in the cloth bag and takes them up to heaven."

So during the !kia state, this man says he can see, both figuratively and literally.

== Becoming a healer ==
Becoming a healer is not just for a few religious specialists. According to Thomas Dowson, the people would rather have it spread throughout the group. It is a long and painful process to become a healer, but still many go along this path. In fact, by the time the people reach adulthood, about half of the men and a third of the women have become healers. Katz says that even though it is painful, people want to become healers so they can help people. If someone is very sick, there is some hope that a healing trance dance can keep them from dying.

== See also ==
- San religion
- San rock art
- Traditional African medicine
- Energy medicine
