= Vinnicombe =

Vinnicombe is a surname. Notable people with the surname include:

- Chris Vinnicombe (born 1970), English footballer and manager
- Martin Vinnicombe (born 1964), Australian cyclist
- Patricia Vinnicombe (1932–2003), South African archaeologist and artist
