= Human Studies Film Archives =

Archive of the National Anthropological Archives

The Human Studies Film Archives (HSFA) is a sister archive to the National Anthropological Archives within the Smithsonian's National Museum of Natural History. HSFA preserves and provides access to ethnographic films and anthropological moving image materials. It is located at the Smithsonian Museum Support Center in Suitland, Maryland.

== History ==
The Archives started in 1975 as the National Anthropological Film Center (NAFC) by creating and collecting films of anthropological research. The NAFC was founded through the advocacy of notable anthropologists and filmmakers Margaret Mead, John Marshall, Timothy Asch, Alan Lomax and Jay Ruby. The first director of the NAFC, E. Richard Sorenson, promoted anthropological film as a scientific research tool. The center received funding from the National Endowment for the Humanities and the National Institutes of Health. In 1981, the NAFC was renamed the Human Studies Film Archives and became part of the Department of Anthropology at the National Museum of Natural History. Today, HSFA collections and resources support research on specific cultures and communities, the development of ethnographic film, and the broad study of visual culture.

== Collections ==
HSFA collections comprise more than 8 million feet of film and almost one thousand hours of video recordings. These visual research resources, along with related documentary material encompass a broad range of documentary, travelogue, ethnographic film and amateur genres from 1908 to the present. Collections include more than 250,000 photographs, fieldnotes and shot logs and field audio recordings. The HSFA holds the major ethnographic film collections of John Marshall's films with Ju/'hoan Bushmen (!Kung), Timothy Asch and Napoleon Chagnon's films of the Yanomami of Brazil, Jorge Preloran's work, and films by David and Judith MacDougall.

== Directors ==
Directors of the National Anthropological Film Center/Human Studies Film Archives have included:

- E. Richard Sorenson (1975-)
- Robert Leopold
- Jake Homiak (-2018)

== See also ==
- National Anthropological Archives
