= National Anthropological Archives =

Archive at the Smithsonian Institution

- Established: 1965
- Location: 4210 Silver Hill Rd Suitland, Maryland
- Type: Archives
- Collections: Ethnographical and archaeological materials
- Collection size: 19,000 cubic feet of records
- Director: Celia Emmelhainz
- Owner: Smithsonian Institution
- Website: www.si.edu/siasc/naa

The National Anthropological Archives is the third largest archive in the Smithsonian Institution and a sister archive to the Human Studies Film Archives. The collection documents the history of anthropology and the world's peoples and cultures, and is used in indigenous language revitalization. It is located in the Smithsonian's Museum Support Center in Suitland, Maryland, and is part of the Department of Anthropology at the National Museum of Natural History.

== History ==
The National Anthropological Archives (NAA) is the successor to the archives of the Bureau of American Ethnology (BAE), which was founded in 1879 by John Wesley Powell. In 1968, The NAA was formalized, incorporating the collections of the BAE, which focused on American Indians, as well as the papers of Smithsonian anthropology curators and other anthropologists who conduct research around the world. The establishment of the NAA was supported by grants from the Wenner-Gren Foundation to provide a repository for scholars without a home institution (or whose home institution had no archives), in order to promote the preservation of the anthropological record.

== Collections ==
The NAA is the only archival repository in the United States dedicated to preserving ethnographic, archaeological, and linguistic fieldnotes, physical anthropological data, photographs, sound recordings and other media created by American anthropologists. The collection includes fieldnotes, journals, manuscripts, correspondence, photographs, maps, sound recordings. Spanning over 150 years of American history and world history, materials held in the archives include nearly 1 million photographs, 20,000 works of indigenous art, and 11,400 sound recordings.

In 2010, the NAA received a Save America's Treasures grant to preserve manuscripts relating to 250 endangered languages. from native North America. NAA photographs and manuscripts, including 8,200 pages of Cherokee language materials, have been scanned and are available online for research through SOVA, the Smithsonian's archival catalog. In 2014, the NAA received a grant for preservation and digitization of sound recordings of endangered languages.

== Directors ==
Directors of the National Anthropological Archives have included:

- Margaret C. Blaker (1968-1972)
- Herman Viola (1972-1986)
- Mary Elizabeth Ruwell (1990-1993)
- John P. Homiak (1993-2005)
- Robert Leopold (2005-2010)
- Candace Greene (2010-2011)
- John P. Homiak (2011-2018)
- Joshua A. Bell (2018-2022)
- Celia Emmelhainz (2022- )

== See also ==
- Human Studies Film Archives
