= The Hunters (1957 film) =

- Directed by: John Marshall in collaboration with Robert Gardner
- Narrated by: John Marshall
- Cinematography: John Marshall
- Edited by: John Marshall
- Production company: Peabody Museum of Archaeology and Ethnology
- Distributed by: Contemporary Films
- Release date: 1957
- Running time: 72 minutes
- Country: United States
- Language: English

The Hunters is a 1957 ethnographic film that documents the efforts of four !Kung men (also known as Ju/'hoansi or Bushmen) to hunt a giraffe in the Kalahari Desert of Namibia. The footage was shot by John Marshall during a Smithsonian-Harvard Peabody sponsored expedition in 1952–53. In addition to the giraffe hunt, the film shows other aspects of !Kung life at that time, including family relationships, socializing and storytelling, and the hard work of gathering plant foods and hunting for small game.

The film was produced at the Film Study Center of the Peabody Museum at Harvard University by John Marshall in collaboration with Robert Gardner. It won the 1957 Robert J. Flaherty Award for best documentary film from the City College Institute of Film Technique, New York, and was selected for preservation in the US National Film Registry by the Librarian of Congress in 2003 for its "cultural, aesthetic, or historical significance". Prior to its inclusion in the National Film Registry, The Hunters was preserved in 2000 with a grant from the National Film Preservation Foundation.

In his book At The Edge of History, William Irwin Thompson uses the structure of The Hunters to model the universal form of conflict in values in human institutions.

== Plot ==
Set in the arid Nyae Nyae region of the Kalahari Desert, the film documents the subsistence practices of the Ju/'hoansi people during the early 1950s. It establishes a gendered division of labor where women gather roots and berries, providing roughly 80% of the community's food while men undertake the difficult task of hunting for the remaining 20% to secure animal protein. The narrative focuses on four hunters Gunda, Gao, Oma, and Ui who set out on an expedition with the resolution not to return empty-handed.

The central plot follows the multi-day pursuit of a female giraffe after initial attempts to trap smaller game, such as mongooses and warthogs. One of the hunters successfully wounds a giraffe with a poison-tipped arrow, but because the toxin acts slowly, the men must track the animal across the desert for five days. Throughout this period, the hunters endure hunger and thirst, often subsisting on gathered berries while monitoring the animal's gradual weakening.

The hunt reaches its climax when the hunters corner the drowsy, poison-weakened giraffe in a glen and kill it using spears. The meat is immediately butchered and dried to prevent spoilage before being carried back to the village. Upon their return, the bounty is shared among the community according to strict social rules, providing enough food for nine days. The film concludes with the men sitting around a campfire, smoking and recounting the events of their journey.

== See also ==
- List of American films of 1957
