= John Marshall (filmmaker) =

American anthropologist and documentary filmmaker (1932-2005)

- Born: John Kennedy Marshall; November 12, 1932; Cambridge, Massachusetts
- Died: April 22, 2005 (aged 72); Boston, Massachusetts
- Education: Harvard University
- Occupations: Anthropologist, filmmaker
- Spouse: Alexandra Eliot
- Children: 3
- Mother: Lorna Marshall
- Family: Elizabeth Marshall Thomas (sister)

John Kennedy Marshall (November 12, 1932 – April 22, 2005) was an American anthropologist and acclaimed documentary filmmaker best known for his work in Namibia recording the lives of the Juǀʼhoansi (also called the !Kung Bushmen).

== Background ==
Marshall was born in Boston, Massachusetts, to Lorna Marshall and Laurence Kennedy Marshall and raised in Cambridge, Massachusetts, and Peterborough, New Hampshire. His sister, Elizabeth Marshall Thomas, is a writer. Marshall had one daughter, Sonya. He married Dr. Alexandra Eliot, who had two sons from a previous marriage, Frederick and Christopher Eliot. Marshall held a B.A. and M.A. in anthropology from Harvard University. Marshall died of lung cancer in April 2005.

== Career ==
Marshall first traveled to the Kalahari Desert and met the Juǀʼhoansi of the Nyae Nyae area in 1950 on a trip initiated by his father to search for the "Lost World of the Kalahari." Before his second trip to the Kalahari, one year later, Marshall received a 16mm Kodak camera and advice from his father, "Don't direct, John, don't try to be artistic, just film what you see people doing naturally." Employing this advice during the 1950s, Marshall's films anticipated the cinéma vérité movement of the 1960s. Throughout the 1950s and 1960s members of the Marshall family—John Marshall, his sister Elizabeth Marshall Thomas, Lorna Marshall, and Laurence Marshall—returned to the Kalahari Desert numerous times to conduct an ethnographic study of the Juǀʼhoansi and document one of the last remaining hunter-gatherer cultures. From 1950 to 1958 Marshall filmed the hunting and gathering life of the Juǀʼhoansi. His first edited film, The Hunters, was released in 1957. The Hunters told the story of a Juǀʼhoansi giraffe hunt. Marshall later realized he had unintentionally romanticized Juǀʼhoansi life. The Hunters portrayed the Juǀʼhoansi as if they continued to live as they always had, where their main conflict was a struggle with nature. But when Marshall filmed them, they were actually suffering from having collided with the modern world and were subsisting primarily on gathered food and struggling to find enough to eat. Recognizing this discrepancy between reality and the portrayal of Juǀʼhoan life in The Hunters, Marshall was determined to produce more objective and less mediated films about the Juǀʼhoansi. He produced a series of short films designed to educate without exoticizing or "imposing western narrative structures on the subjects."

During the 1960s and most of the 1970s, Marshall, and nearly all anthropologists and filmmakers, were banned from visiting the Juǀʼhoansi by a government that saw them as "a threat to the status quo." So during this period, Marshall produced many short films about the Juǀʼhoansi of Nyae Nyae from the footage he had collected in the 1950s and pursued other film projects in the United States. He was the cinematographer for Fred Wiseman's first documentary film, Titicut Follies. Marshall also shot and produced a series of short films about police work in Pittsburgh, Pennsylvania. In 1968, Marshall and Tim Asch founded Documentary Educational Resources, a non-profit organization dedicated to facilitating the use of cross-cultural documentaries in the classroom.

Marshall became involved in grassroots organizing and development in Nyae Nyae in the 1980s, forming a foundation that would become the Nyae Nyae Development Foundation of Namibia and devoting himself to advocating on behalf of the Juǀʼhoansi. In 2003, the Society for Visual Anthropology bestowed on Marshall a lifetime achievement award for his 50 years of work among the hunter gatherer society.

Two million feet of Marshall's 16mm documentary footage along with thousands of hours of video footage as well as edited films and videos of Juǀʼhoansi are held at the Human Studies Film Archives, Smithsonian Institution. Known officially as the John Marshall Juǀʼhoan Bushman Film and Video Collection, 1950–2000, the collection was added to UNESCO's Memory of the World Register for documentary heritage of world importance in July 2009. Cynthia Close, former executive director of Documentary Educational Resources, called the collection, "unparalleled in the history of film and in the history of documenting humanity".

== Evolution of reality filmmaking ==
John Marshall produced realistic films that combined documentary media and ethnographic film. His work offers an evolving, original, and unique view on what was technically possible and stylistic in documentary through his more than fifty years as a filmmaker. Marshall was a pioneer in the cinéma vérité style. He is quoted as saying, "I began shooting events from angles and distances that approximated the perspectives of the people I was filming, I tried to film as a member of the group rather than shoot standing outside as an observer." He began thinking about his position vis-à-vis the people he was filming, asking, "Am I someone in the group? Who? Why am I looking at the other person? Am I an outside observer? If I am an observer who am I? Is there anyone else observing from this angle and distance? What are they seeing and thinking?" Marshall's shooting style evolved to reflect his position within the society he was filming, that of participant more than outside observer. As similar as this approach sounds to cinéma vérité, Marshall employed sit-down interviews in many of his films such as Nǃai, the Story of a ǃKung Woman and cinéma vérité does not use sit-down interviews.

In his early films, and indeed, most of his films about the Juǀʼhoansi, Marshall presents realistic views of the changing life of the once hunter-gatherer culture, but he himself is never a central character in those films. However, in his 2002 6-episode film A Kalahari Family, the curtain is pulled and John Marshall, as well as his family, who by that time had been involved in both ethnographic and then political efforts with the Juǀʼhoansi since the early 1950s, are revealed. This may be the ultimate in reality filmmaking, as the Marshalls have been intimately involved in the Juǀʼhoansi culture, making both positive and negative impacts, and finally in A Kalahari Family, their impact is explored.

== Filmography ==
- 1957: The Hunters
- 1961: A Group Of Women
- 1962: A Joking Relationship
- 1967: Titicut Follies (cinematographer)
- 1969: An Argument About Marriage
- 1969: ‘N/um Tchai: The Ceremonial Dance of the !Kung Bushmen
- 1969: A Curing Ceremony
- 1970: Inside/Outside Station 9 (Pittsburgh Police Series)
- 1970: The Melon Tossing Game
- 1970: The Lion Game
- 1971: Three Domestics (Pittsburgh Police Series)
- 1971: Vagrant Woman (Pittsburgh Police Series)
- 1971: Bitter Melons
- 1972: Investigation of a Hit and Run (Pittsburgh Police Series)
- 1972: 901/904 (Pittsburgh Police Series)
- 1972: Debe’‘s Tantrum
- 1972: Playing With Scorpions
- 1972: A Rite of Passage
- 1972: !Kung Bushmen Hunting Equipment
- 1972: A Wasp Nest
- 1973: After the Game (Pittsburgh Police Series)
- 1973: A Forty Dollar Misunderstanding (Pittsburgh Police Series)
- 1973: The Informant (Pittsburgh Police Series)
- 1973: A Legal Discussion of a Hit and Run (Pittsburgh Police Series)
- 1973: Manifold Controversy (Pittsburgh Police Series)
- 1973: Nothing Hurt But My Pride (Pittsburgh Police Series)
- 1973: Two Brothers (Pittsburgh Police Series)
- 1973: $21 or 21 Days (Pittsburgh Police Series)
- 1973: Wrong Kid (Pittsburgh Police Series)
- 1973: You Wasn't Loitering (Pittsburgh Police Series)
- 1973: Henry Is Drunk (Pittsburgh Police Series)
- 1973: The 4th, 5th, & Exclusionary Rule (Pittsburgh Police Series)
- 1973: Men Bathing
- 1974: The Meat Fight
- 1974: Baobab Play
- 1974: Children Throw Toy Assegais
- 1974: Tug-Of-War-Bushmen
- 1978: If It Fits
- 1980: N!ai, the Story of a !Kung Woman
- 1985: Pull Ourselves Up Or Die Out
- 1987: The !Kung San: Traditional Life
- 1988: The !Kung San: Resettlement
- 1990: To Hold Our Ground: A Field Report
- 2001: Between Two Worlds: John Marshall (interviewee)
- 2002: A Kalahari Family

== Publications ==
By John Marshall

- "Filming and Learning", in a special edition of Visual Anthropology entitled The Cinema of John Marshall, Gordon and Breach Publishers, 1993
- "Plight of the Bushman", Leadership Magazine, Johannesburg, South Africa, 1985
- "Where are the Ju/'hoansi of Nyae Nyae? Changes in a Bushman Society 1950–1981", with Claire Ritchie, for Center for African Studies, University of Cape Town, Cape Town, South Africa, 1984
- "Death Blow to the Bushmen", in Cultural Survival Quarterly, Vol. 8, No. 3, 1984
- "Urban Film", with Emilie de Brigard in Visual Anthropology, Paul Hockings, Editor, H. Mouton & Co,, The Hague, 1975
- "Man as a Hunter", Natural History Museum, 1958

On John Marshall

- Tomaselli, Keyan, Visual Anthropology, Encounters in the Kalahari, Chicago, 1999.
- Ruby, Jay, The Cinema of John Marshall, Switzerland, 1993.
- Kapfer, J., Petermann, W., Thoms, R.,Jager und Gejagte John Marshall und seine Filme, Germany, 1991.

== See also ==
- Tim Asch
