= Walter Reed Biosystematics Unit =

- Country: United States of America
- Branch: United States Army
- Type: Medical R&D Command
- Role: Military medical research and development
- Part of: U.S. Army Medical Research and Materiel Command
- Garrison/HQ: US Army Garrison Forest Glen
- Mottos: "Know the Vector, Know the Threat"

The Walter Reed Biosystematics Unit (WRBU) was a United States Army organization that conducted laboratory and field research on the systematics of medically important arthropods in support of epidemiological investigations and disease prevention and control strategies of importance to the military. Research was carried out worldwide, within geographic or faunistic restrictions of the material available and military requirements. Research efforts focused on the development of accurate and reliable means of identifying vectors of arbopathogens of humans.

The WRBU also performed arthropod collections management for the Department of Entomology, National Museum of Natural History (NMNH) mosquito collection and maintains a molecular entomology laboratory within the Smithsonian Museum Support Center for joint use of WRBU and NMNH personnel.

== History ==
Army entomologists began formal collaborations with Smithsonian Institution entomologists as early as 1961. The WRBU's unit lineage began with the stand up of the Army Mosquito Project (AMP) in 1964. In 1966, the AMP's mission was refocused on the vectorborne disease threat facing troops deployed to southeast Asia for the Vietnam War and the unit was reorganized as the Southeast Asia Mosquito Project (SEAMP). After the war in southeast Asia wound down, SEAMP was reorganized in 1974 as the Medical Entomology Project (MEP) to encompass a broader long-term mission. In 1981, the MEP was reorganized as the Walter Reed Biosystematics Unit, and the unit has retained that identity through subsequent moves and restructurings. The name commemorates U.S. Army physician Major Walter Reed who in 1901 led the team that established that yellow fever is transmitted by mosquitoes.

As of 2017, the WRBU operated under the direction of the Department of Entomology, Walter Reed Army Institute of Research (WRAIR), with laboratories and offices in the Smithsonian Museum Support Center in Suitland, Maryland. Collaborative partners in addition to the WRAIR included the U.S. Army Medical Research and Materiel Command, the NMNH, and the Armed Forces Pest Management Board.

The U.S. Army elected to close the WRBU in March 2025.

== Specimen collection ==
The WRBU assisted in conserving the NMNH Mosquito Collection, the largest mosquito collection in the world, with over 1.5 million specimens. The WRBU maintained and secured specimens, handled transactions including loans of material, improved the collection, provided assistance to Department of Entomology personnel, Smithsonian Institution Research Associates, visiting scientists, and mosquito researchers in locating and examining specimens in the collection.

== Primary research projects ==
- Medically Important Vectors: Projects included a mosquito genus key for the United States Southern Command (SOUTHCOM) Area of Responsibility (AOR); computer-based identification keys to the Anopheles malaria vectors of the SOUTHCOM AOR, including keys to all Anopheles adult and larval mosquitoes of Central America, and taxonomic revision and key to adult Anopheles subgenus Nyssorhynchus of Central and South America; an illustrated identification guide for Anopheles mosquitoes of Africa; creation of identification tools for the medically important culicine (non-Anopheles) mosquitoes of Central and South America; web-based identification keys to Anopheles adult female and larval mosquitoes belonging to subgenera Kerteszia and Anopheles of South America; an illustrated identification guide for the medically important sand flies of Southwest Asia; and a web-based illustrated identification guide for the Phlebotomine sand flies of Central and South America.
- VectorMap: An online, geospatially-referenced website for mosquito, sand fly, tick, mite, flea and host/ reservoir species observation data and distribution models that allows researchers and vector control personnel to access maps that display vector observation data from a variety of databases as points or country-level aggregations, and interrogate these layers to learn more about the observations. Users also have access to supplemental layers representing species richness estimates and predicted species distribution useful in identifying potential new collection locations.
