= Hawkes' ladder of inference =

Archaeological theory framework

Hawkes' ladder of inference is an archaeological argument outlined by Christopher Hawkes in a 1954 paper that describes increasing difficulty of making inferences about ancient society with artifacts. Hawkes argued that it was easiest to infer how artifacts were made and hardest to describe the religion of a society.

== Argument ==
What became the paper outlining Hawkes' ladder was first presented as a lecture by Hawkes in November 1953 at a dinner hosted by the WennerGren Foundation at Harvard University. The paper itself was 14 pages with about half a page outlining his fundamental argument.

Hawkes' proposed in his argument a ladder that has four "rungs" and described the increasing difficulty of making assumptions about ancient societies with archaeological data. The bottom "rung" is making inferences about how artifacts were made and what technology they were made with, the second the economic systems built on those tools, and third the society that emerged. At the top of his ladder was the society's religion, which he argued to be "the hardest of all" to make inferences about.

== Reception ==
In 1998 Christopher Evans wrote in Antiquity that the "ladder" paper is "[a] key document in the history of 20th-century archaeology, citation to it is almost mandatory in any overview of the development of archaeological thought and it often serves as a 'windmill' to be tilted at when marshalling theoretical argument."
