= Patricia Vinnicombe =

South African-born archaeologist (1932–2003)

Patricia Joan "Pat" Vinnicombe
- Born: 17 March 1932; Cape Province, South Africa
- Died: 30 March 2003 (aged 71); Karratha, Western Australia
- Education: University of Witwatersrand; Clare Hall, Cambridge
- Spouse: Patrick Carter
- Scientific career
- Fields: Archaeologist occupational therapist
- Workplaces: Western Australian Museum

Patricia Joan Vinnicombe (17 March 1932 – 30 March 2003) was a South African archaeologist and artist, known for identifying and copying San rock paintings in the valleys and foothills of the Drakensberg. Her work transformed the study of rock art into a science. She was also active in the preservation of Aboriginal art in Western Australia.

== Early life and career ==
Vinnicombe was born in the Mount Currie District, East Griqualand, Cape Province, South Africa and grew up on the farm West Ilsey in the Underberg district, KwaZulu-Natal surrounded by rock art paintings in the Drakensberg mountains. She made her first copies of these paintings at the age of 13. She went to school in Underberg and Pietermaritzburg.

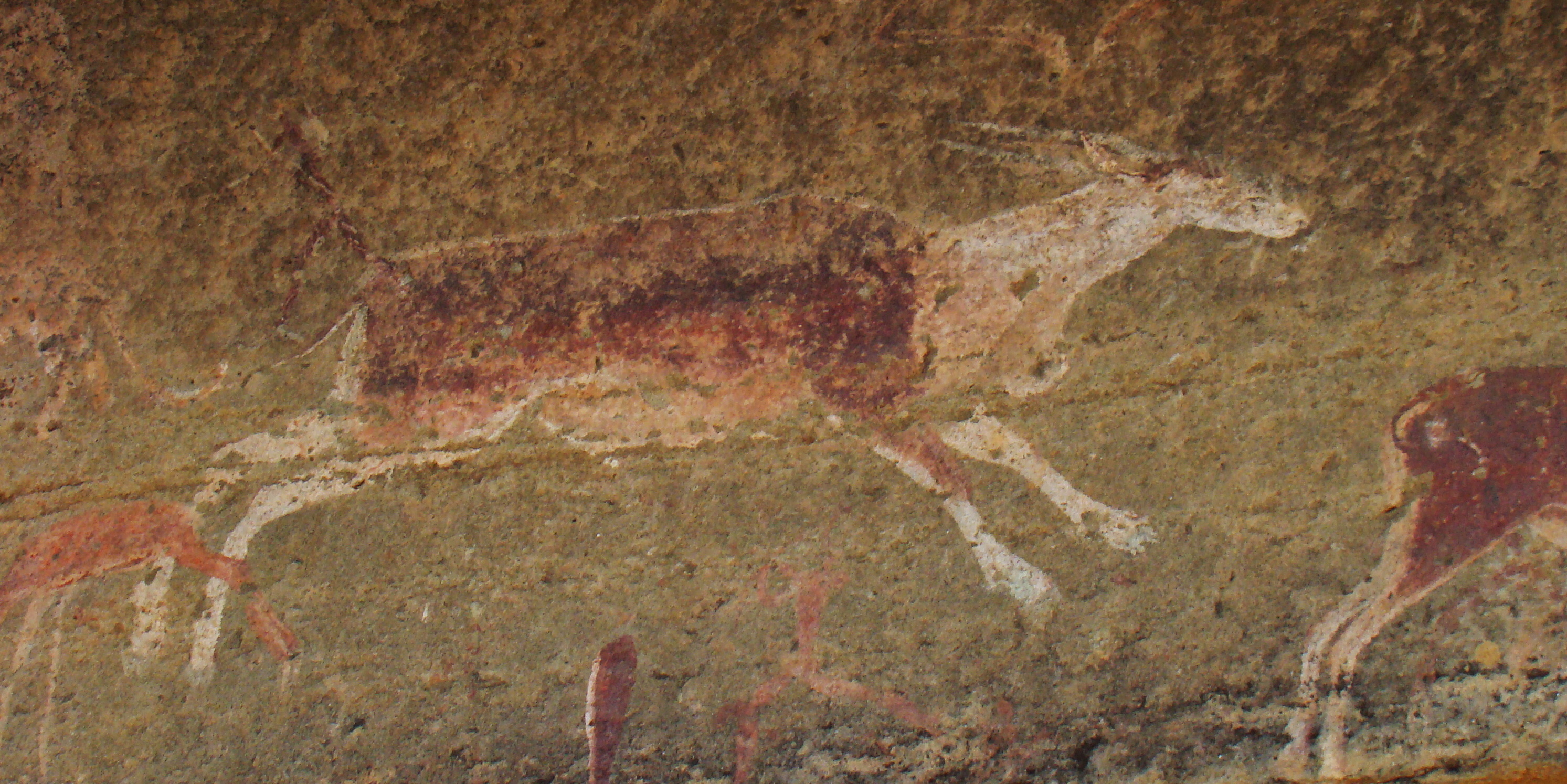
San rock painting of eland

She studied at the University of the Witwatersrand (WITS) and qualified as an occupational therapist in 1954 and later worked as a therapist in London. However, contact with the paleoanatomists Raymond Dart and Philip Tobias at WITS led her to concentrate on the study of rock paintings in the Drakensberg region. While at WITS she learnt basic rock art tracing techniques and she developed her own rock art tracing technique using polythene and watercolour tempera which was mixed with a detergent as fixative.

During the time she was working in London as a therapist she also managed to exhibit her work at the Imperial Institute. The positive response to the exhibit led her to develop a more detailed method of copying the paintings, based on 23 attributes. The credibility of Vinnicombe's method provided her with the opportunity to return to South Africa and trace rock paintings in the Drakensberg.

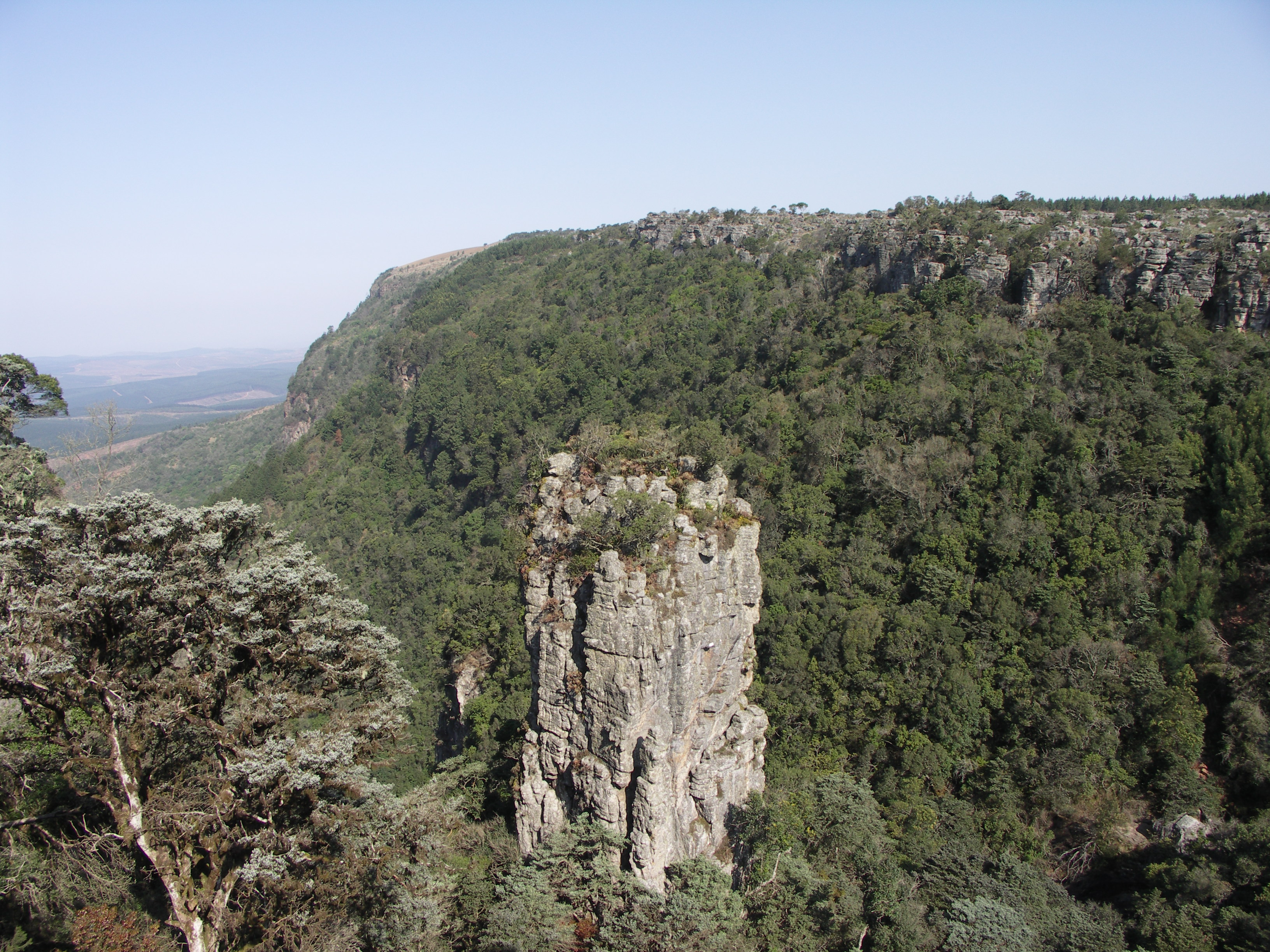
The Pinnacle outside Graskop on the Drakensberg Escarpment in Mpumalanga

== The Drakensberg ==
In 1958 she undertook a detailed survey of the Drakensberg to record all the rock paintings within it. This research was sponsored by the Human Sciences Research Council and was conducted under the supervision of B.D. Malan, secretary of the Historical Monuments Commission. They devised a programme of numerical analysis which could be performed using punched cards.

It was while working in the Drakensberg that Vinnicombe met archaeologist Patrick Carter who had been excavating in Lesotho and KwaZulu-Natal. They married in 1961 and when they returned to Cambridge, England she was awarded a Research Fellowship at Clare Hall. This allowed her to continue to analyse the data she had collected in the Drakensberg.

She was profoundly influenced by anthropological theory and encouraged by the anthropologists Edmund Leach and Isaac Schapera and by archaeologist Peter Ucko. This led her to explore records of San history, life and belief and during this time she worked closely with John Wright and corresponded with David Lewis-Williams. She also consulted with the Natal Archives in Pietermaritzburg, the Natal Society library, the Killie Campbell Africana Museum and the Natal Museum to obtain more information about the history and background of the San.

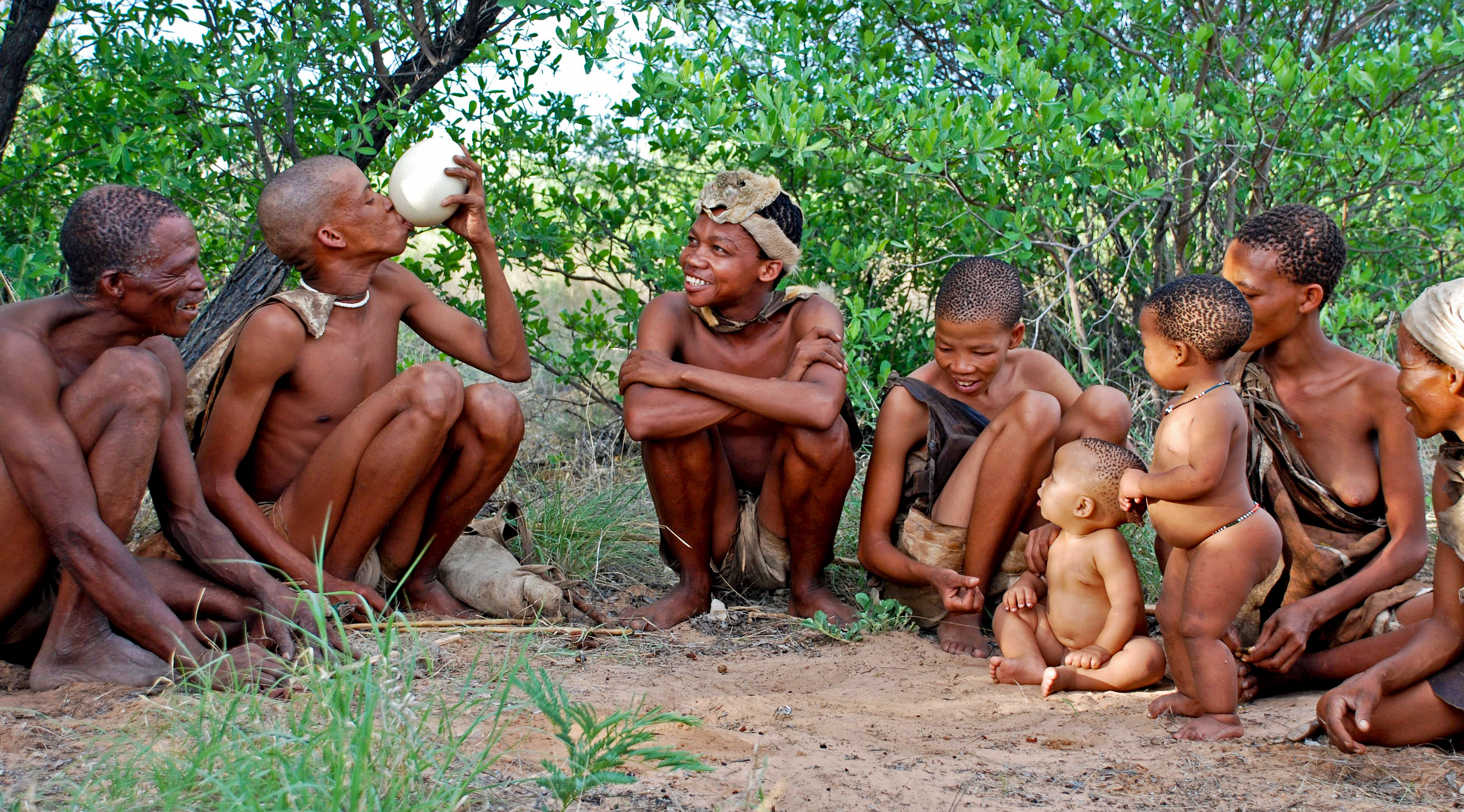
San family

In 1967 the South African Archaeological Bulletin published her methodology and the South African Journal of Science published some preliminary results from among the 8,478 images she had recorded. The study indicated that art from different regions could be compared using numerical techniques. This idea would ultimately transform the study of South African rock art into a scientific pursuit.

In 1972 she published her article Myth, motive and selection in Southern African Rock Art in which she combined San ethnography and rock art with particular emphasis on images of the eland antelope, the most commonly depicted image in San rock art.

In 1976 she published the book People of the Eland: rock paintings of the Drakensberg Bushmen as a reflection of their life and thought. The University of Natal published the book and the University of Cambridge awarded her a PhD. At the time of Vinnicombe's death the book was still a widely used reference book.

Vinnicombe and Carter worked for periods in Ghana, Tanzania, Ethiopia and Egypt. Vinnicombe assisted in documenting UNESCO sites that were later flooded by the filling of the Aswan Dam in Egypt. In 1974 Carter and Vinnicombe searched for rock art sites in the Hadar and Dire Dawa provinces of Ethiopia.

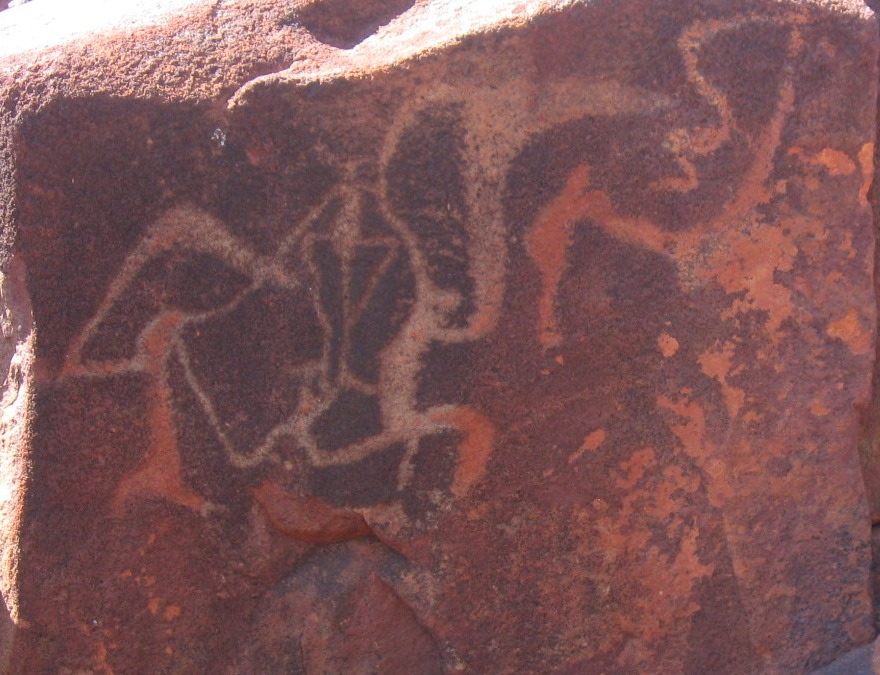
Aboriginal rock carving in Burrup Peninsula, Australia

== Rights, land claims and welfare ==
In 1978, Vinnicombe emigrated with her son to Australia where she was employed by the Australian Institute of Aboriginal Studies (AIA) in Canberra and the National Parks and Wildlife Service in New South Wales. She also spent time in Sydney surveying Aboriginal sites in the North Hawkesbury Archaeological Project, prior to construction of a dam in the area. The project ended in 1980 and Vinnicombe's report on this work, entitled Predeliction and Prediction: a study of Aboriginal sites in the Gosford-Wyong region, was never published.

Vinnicombe used the data from the North Hawkesbury project to determine various characteristics of Aboriginal rockshelters. These were then applied to rockshelters in the Mangrove Creek Dam area prior to the dam's completion to determine if they had been inhabited. The research was then expanded beyond rockshelters and led to a concept called Potential Archaeological Deposits – sites that showed the characteristics of having been previously inhabited and could contain artefacts. In areas where these sites were threatened they could be identified and test excavated. This enabled the detection of archaeological sites before they were discovered (and potentially damaged) by construction work.

From 1980 she worked as Research officer in the department of Aboriginal sites at the Western Australian Museum in Perth and was mainly concerned with Aboriginal rights, land claims and welfare. She claimed it was easier to interpret Aboriginal art since she could ask the Aborigines what the intentions of the painters were.

In the 1990s Vinnicombe became involved in an environmental lobby action in the Burrup Peninsula, Western Australia where Aboriginal engraving were threatened by chemical emissions from the gas industry located there. In 1997, she retired, but continued her work with a grant from the AIA as an Honorary member of the Western Australian Museum. One area of her research was Bardi Jawi dancing boards.

Vinnicombe returned to South Africa for 3-month-long periods in 2001 and 2002 to work at the Rock Art Research Institute at the University of the Witwatersrand. She spent this time, with the help of her assistant J. Olofsson, cataloguing copies of rock art that she had made in the 1950s and 1960s which had not been looked at since. This work was funded by the Swan Fund of Oxford University. She was expected to return to South Africa again in May 2003 but she died suddenly on 30 March 2003 in Karratha, Western Australia. She had been on a field trip at the time with a colleague from South Africa, Warren Fish. They had been investigating possible damage to Aboriginal art caused by industrial emissions, as she had done in the 1990s.

== Selected publications ==
- Vinnicombe, Patricia (2013). People of the Eland. Johannesburg: Witwatersrand University Press Publication. ISBN 9781868144976.
- Vinnicombe, Patricia. (1976) "People of the eland: rock paintings of the Drakensberg Bushmen as a reflection of their life and thought." University of Natal Press
- Vinnicombe, Patricia. (1972) "Myth, motive, and selection in southern African rock art." Africa 42.03 : 192–204.
- Vinnicombe, Patricia. (1967) "Rock-painting analysis." The South African Archaeological Bulletin : 129–141.
- Vinnicombe, Patricia. (1972) "Motivation in African rock art." Antiquity 46.182 (1972): 124–133.
- Vinnicombe, Patricia. (1987) "Dampier archaeological project: resource document, survey and salvage of Aboriginal sites, Burrup Peninsula, Western Australia" : for Woodside Offshore Petroleum Pty Ltd. Western Australia Museum
- Vinnicombe, Patricia. (1975) "The ritual significance of eland (Taurotragus oryx) in the rock art of southern Africa." Les religions de la préhistoire: actes du Valcamonica symposium.
- Vinnicombe, Patricia. (1971) "A Bushman hunting kit from the Natal Drakensberg." Southern African Humanities 20.3 : 611–625.
- Vinnicombe, Patricia. (1967) "The recording of rock paintings-an interim report." South African Journal of Science 63:282–284.
- Vinnicombe, Patricia (1986) "Rock art, territory and land rights." In Biesele, M., Gordon, R & Lee, R (eds.) The past and future of Kung ethnography: critical reflections and symbolic perspectives. Essays in honour of Lorna Marshall. Hamburg: Helmut Buske Verlag: 275–309.
- Vinnicombe, P & Moaljarlai, D. (1995) "That rock is a cloud: concepts associated with rock images in the Kimberley region of Australia." In K. Helskog & B. Olsen (eds.) Perceiving rock art: social and political perspectives pp. 228–246.
