= Elizabeth Marshall Thomas =

American author (born 1931)

Elizabeth Marshall Thomas (born September 13, 1931) is an American author. She has published fiction and non-fiction books and articles on animal behavior, Paleolithic life, and the !Kung Bushmen of the Kalahari Desert.

== Early life and education ==
Thomas was born to anthropologist Lorna Marshall and Laurence K. Marshall, co-founder of the Raytheon Corporation. She is the sister of ethnographic filmmaker John Marshall. She was raised in Cambridge, Massachusetts and attended Abbot Academy in Andover, Massachusetts.

After beginning undergraduate studies at Smith College, Thomas took a break to travel in Africa with her family and later completed a degree in English from Radcliffe College.

== Career ==
Between 1950 and 1956, she took part in three expeditions to live with and study the Ju/'hoansi (!Kung Bushmen) of the Kalahari Desert in Namibia and Botswana. During these trips, Thomas kept a journal which she later drew on when writing her first book, The Harmless People. She later drew on this experience in her fiction, depicting the life of Paleolithic hunter gatherers in the novels Reindeer Moon and The Animal Wife.

A popular success and New York Times bestseller, her book The Hidden Life of Dogs also drew criticism from some in the scientific and dog training communities for Thomas' observational methods and analysis. Thomas wrote a follow-up book, The Social Life of Dogs: The Grace of Canine Company as well as books on feline and deer behavior. She also contributes, along with Sy Montgomery, to a column called "Tamed/Untamed" in the Boston Globe.

== Personal life ==
Ms. Thomas has long made her home in Peterborough, New Hampshire. With proceeds from her bestselling book about dogs, she donated land for Peterborough's first town beach at Cunningham Pond. She served on the town's Select Board for 15 years.

== Bibliography ==
=== Non-fiction ===
Anthropology

- The Harmless People. 1959.
- Warrior Herdsmen (1965), Secker & Warburg, ASIN B0000CMXZI
- The Harmless People (Revised ed.). Vintage Books. 1989.
- The Old Way: A Story of the First People (2006) Farrar, Straus and Giroux, ISBN 978-0374225520

Ethology and animal culture

- The Hidden Life of Life (2018), Penn State University Press, ISBN 978-0271081014
- The Hidden Life of Dogs (1993), Houghton Mifflin, ISBN 978-0395669587
- The Tribe of Tiger: Cats and Their Culture (1994), Simon & Schuster, ISBN 978-0671799656
- The Social Lives of Dogs: The Grace of Canine Company (2000), Simon & Schuster, ISBN 978-0684810263
- The Hidden Life of Deer: Lessons from the Natural World (2009), Harper, ISBN 978-0061792106
- A Million Years with You: A Memoir of Life Observed (2013), Houghton Mifflin Harcourt, ISBN 978-0547763958

"Growing Old: Notes On Aging With Something Like Grace" (2020), HarperOne, Harper Collins, ISBN 9780062956439 (hardcover)/ISBN 9780062956477

=== Novels ===
- Reindeer Moon (1987), Houghton Mifflin, ISBN 978-0395421123
- The Animal Wife (1990), Houghton Mifflin, ISBN 978-0395524534
- Certain Poor Shepherds: A Christmas Tale (1996), Simon & Schuster, ISBN 978-0684833132

=== Critical studies and reviews of Thomas' work ===
- Morris, Desmond (November 3, 1994). "CATS". The New York Review of Books. 41 (18): 16–17.
