= Smithsonian Museum Support Center =

Collections management and research facility in Suitland, Maryland, US

- Location within Maryland Smithsonian Museum Support Center (the United States)
- Established: 1983
- Location: 4210 Silver Hill Road Suitland, Maryland
- Coordinates: 38.8427917°N 76.9397361°W
- Type: Collections conservation and storage
- Public transit access: Suitland
- Website: naturalhistory.si.edu/research/msc

The Smithsonian Institution's Museum Support Center (MSC) is a collections storage and conservation facility in Suitland, Maryland, which houses Smithsonian collections which are not on display in the museums. It is not usually open to the public, due to security concerns, though occasionally special tours are organized.

More than 54 million collections items are housed at the MSC. This comprises approximately 40 percent of the Smithsonian's collection which is not on display, while the rest of the objects are housed behind-the-scenes in the museums themselves or at other off-site storage facilities.

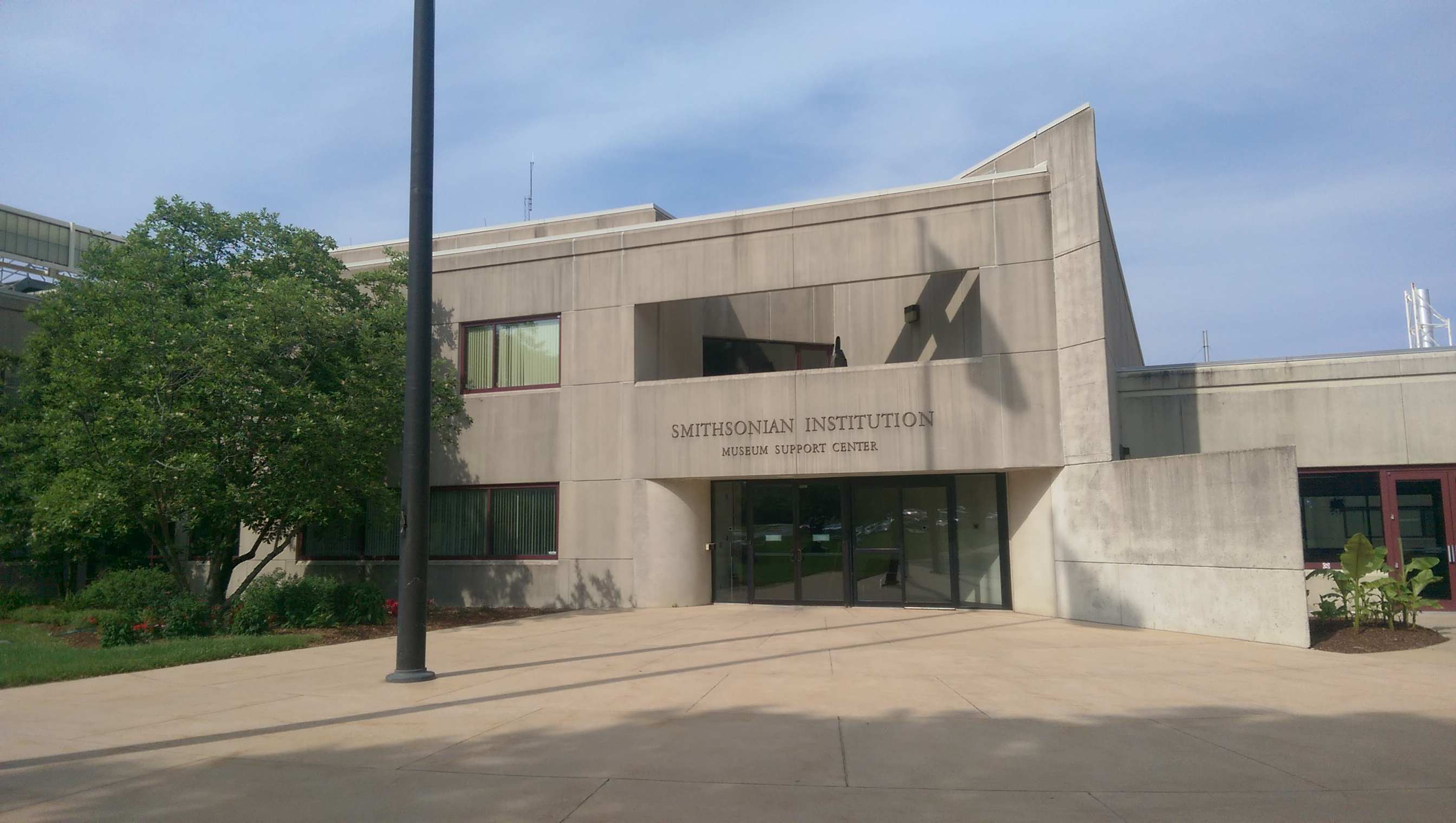
Entrance to the Museum Support Center.

The collections are housed in five numbered buildings, called "pods", each about the size of a 3-story-tall football field. The pods total 435,000 square feet of collections storage space. Notable features include "enormous tanks for cleaning whale skulls, chambers to preserve Antarctic meteorites, art from throughout the ages, and a botany collection with five greenhouses".

The MSC was dedicated in May 1983, after two years of construction and ten years of planning. It opened with the first four pods, plus offices, labs, and plans to expand into two additional pods. The fifth pod was dedicated in April 2007 at the east end of the MSC, and now houses all of the National Museum of Natural History's biological collections (25 million specimens) preserved in fluids, known as the "wet collections".

The environment within the MSC is strictly controlled in order to minimize impact on collections, and is based on research by engineers at the Museum Conservation Institute (located at the MSC) and the Smithsonian's Office of Facilities, Engineering and Operations. The target temperature is generally set at 70 degrees Fahrenheit (+/- 4 degrees), with relative humidity at 45 percent (+/- 8 percent).

In its laboratory and office areas, the MSC houses the Smithsonian's Museum Conservation Institute (MCI), the Laboratories of Analytical Biology (LAB) and other numerous departments from the National Museum of Natural History, including the Department of Anthropology, the National Anthropological Archives (NAA), the Human Studies Film Archives (HSFA), the Walter Reed Biosystematics Unit (WRBU), as well as branch of the Smithsonian Institution Libraries.
