= Lorna Marshall =

American anthropologist (1898–2002)

- Born: Lorna Jean McLean; September 14, 1898; Morenci, Arizona territory
- Died: July 8, 2002 (aged 103); Peterborough, New Hampshire
- Education: Harvard University
- Partner: Laurence Marshall
- Children: Elizabeth Marshall Thomas, John Kennedy Marshall
- Scientific career
- Fields: Anthropology

Lorna Marshall (born Lorna Jean McLean; September 14, 1898 – July 8, 2002) was an American anthropologist who in the 1950s, 60s and 70s lived among and wrote about the previously unstudied !Kung people of the Kalahari Desert.

== Background ==
Marshall was born in Morenci, Arizona territory. She married Laurence Kennedy Marshall in 1926; they had a daughter Elizabeth Marshall Thomas (born 1931) and a son John Kennedy Marshall (1932–2005). Marshall received a BA in English Literature from UC Berkeley in 1921 and an MA from Radcliffe College in 1928, and before 1926 worked as an English instructor at Mount Holyoke. Later she took anthropology courses at Harvard University and had a second career as an ethnographer. Her husband was born in Medford, Massachusetts in 1889, studied at Tufts University, and co-founded the Raytheon Company in 1922 where he worked until 1950.

In 1951, the Marshall family went to South-West Africa (now Namibia) to conduct an ethnographic study of the !Kung of Nyae Nyae (also known as the Ju/'hoansi or Ju/'hoan Bushmen). The family became deeply engaged in this work and returned to Africa on several expeditions throughout the 1950s and 1960s, each lasting from a few months to a year and a half. As Elizabeth Marshall Thomas explains in her book, The Old Way, Laurence Marshall attempted to recruit an anthropologist to join their expeditions, but no one was interested. It then fell to Lorna Marshall to conduct ethnographic interviews and compile fieldnotes, despite the fact that she had no formal anthropological training.

During the 1960s and 1970s, Marshall published numerous articles on !Kung culture and religion (reference needed). Her first book, The !Kung of Nyae Nyae, was published in 1976 to positive reviews including one by Alan Barnard, who called Marshall "one of the most sensitive, meticulous and unpretentious ethnographers of all time." Marshall enjoyed a long career, publishing her second book, Nyae Nyae !Kung Beliefs and Rites, in 1999 when she was 101. In addition to written ethnography, Lorna Marshall also collaborated on several ethnographic films about the !Kung of Nyae Nyae with her son, John Kennedy Marshall (1932–2005), a documentary and ethnographic filmmaker.

She died at her daughter Elizabeth's home in Peterborough, New Hampshire, where she had lived since 1996, in 2002 at the age of 103; she had previously lived in the same house in Cambridge, Massachusetts, since the late 1920s.

== Books ==
- The !Kung of Nyae Nyae. Cambridge, Mass.: Harvard University Press, 1976.
- Nyae Nyae !Kung Beliefs and Rites. Peabody Museum Monographs no. 8, 1999.

== Film Credits ==
- First Film (1952), Editing and Narration
- !Kung Bushman Hunting Equipment (1966), Ethnography and Script
- Bitter Melons (1971), Ethnography
- A Kalahari Family (2002), Executive Producer
