= The Mind in the Cave =

Book by David Lewis-Williams

The Mind in the Cave: Consciousness and the Origins of Art
- The first edition to the book
- Author: David Lewis-Williams
- Language: English
- Subject: Archaeology; Religious studies
- Publisher: Thames and Hudson
- Publication date: 2002
- Publication place: United Kingdom
- Media type: Print (Hardcover and paperback)

The Mind in the Cave: Consciousness and the Origins of Art is a 2002 study of Upper Palaeolithic European rock art written by the archaeologist David Lewis-Williams, then a professor at the University of the Witwatersrand in Johannesburg, South Africa.

== Background ==
Lewis-Williams first published some of the ideas that would form the basis for his argument in The Mind in the Cave in a 1988 academic paper co-written with Thomas Dowson entitled "The Signs of All Times: Entoptic Phenomena in Upper Palaeolithic Art" Fellow archaeologist Robert J. Wallis would later characterise this as "one of the most controversial papers" in rock art research.

== Synopsis ==
Lewis-Williams opens The Mind in the Cave with a preface, in which he outlines the methodology that he is working with, and emphasises his position that "we do not have to explain everything to explain something". what he calls "Three Caves: Three Time-Bytes", brief page-long narratives set in the Upper Palaeolithic sites of the Volp Caves, the Niaux Cave and Chauvet Cave.

In the first chapter, entitled "Discovering Human Antiquity", Lewis-Williams explores the early scholarly understanding of Upper Palaeolithic art, stemming from the increased interest in the origins of the human species sparked by the publication of Charles Darwin's On the Origin of Species. He proceeds to discuss early attempts to analyse both portable and parietal art, and the early belief that cave paintings were forgeries, being too sophisticated to have been produced by "primitive" humans, before scholars eventually came to accept their authenticity. Finally, he notes the developments in radiocarbon dating, which enabled far more accurate dating of archaeological sites, allowing scholars to appreciate the exact antiquity of the Upper Palaeolithic.

Chapter two, "Seeking Answers", proceeds to examine the various different interpretative approaches that scholars have taken to the Upper Palaeolithic cave art of Europe. Noting the problems innate with using the term "art", he nevertheless believes it can still be used in this context with caution. From there, he looks at the early claims that rejected symbolic-religious explanations, instead adopting an "art for art's sake" approach, and then its fall from academic credibility. He then discusses the claims that the artworks did have symbolic meanings, being either totemic or representative of sympathetic magic, both arguments made from ethnographic parallels with modern hunter-gatherer communities such as those of Australia. Lewis-Williams goes on to discuss structuralist interpretations of the artworks, such as those first advocated by Giambattista Vico and Ferdinand de Saussure, and later reformulated by the likes of Max Raphael, Annette Laming-Emperaire and André Leroi-Gourhan.

== Reception and recognition ==
Archaeologist Robert J. Wallis reviewed The Mind in the Cave for the Journal for the Academic Study of Magic. Proclaiming it to be "a timely introduction" to a shamanistic interpretation of Upper Palaeolithic rock art, Wallis believed that Lewis-Davidson puts forward "a compelling case" for the nature of such cave paintings. Although he had some reservations, he noted that the book established the shamanistic interpretation as being at the "forefront" of rock art research. He ended his review by mentioning the manner in which Lewis-Williams ended the book by emphasising that there is no reason for contemporary people to be shamans; himself a Neoshaman, Wallis noted that Lewis-Williams might be concerned that "his work will inspire neo-Shamanism rather than rational materialism", but proceeded to express his opinion that even if it did so, it would "be none the worse for that."

=== Wider recognition ===
Writing in his opening paper, "Agency, Intellect and the Archaeological Agenda", published in the academic anthology Signals of Belief in Early England: Anglo-Saxon Paganism Revisited (2010), the archaeologist Martin Carver praised Lewis-Williams' book, describing it as "stimulating" and remarking that it had "redefined the world of early spirituality for archaeologists". Considering Lewis-Williams' case to be "persuasive", Carver felt that the theories contained within it could be used to shine light on the world of Anglo-Saxon paganism.

== See also ==
- List of Stone Age art
