= Bureau of Entomology =

Defunct bureau of the United States government

The Bureau of Entomology was a unit within the federal government of the United States from 1894 to 1934. It developed from a section of the Department of Agriculture which had been working on entomological researches and allied issues relating to insects. In 1934 it was merged with the Bureau of Plant Quarantine to form the Bureau of Entomology and Plant Quarantine. A later merger with the Bureau of Animal Industry created the Agricultural Research Service in 1953. Many of the Bureau of Entomology insect systematists worked in the national entomology collections in the National Museum of Natural History. Others worked at Agricultural Experiment Stations around the U.S. and abroad.

== Early developments ==
The American Entomological Society was organized at Philadelphia in 1859, incorporated in 1862, and known until 1867 as the Entomological Society of Philadelphia. On Friday, May 18, 1866, Mr. O'Neill requested an appropriation from the Congress of the United States to maintain the organization's publication Practical Entomologist. The request for Federal funds established a connection between the organization and the Federal government.

The U. S. Department of Agriculture was created on July 1, 1862. It included four bureaus, one of which eventually became identified with the Bureau of Entomology. An "entomological division" in the Department of Agriculture existed in 1872, according to Congressional records. The first two USDA entomologists were Townend Glover (1863-1878) and Charles Valentine Riley (1878-1879, 1881-1894).

== Exotic insect pests reach the United States ==
The spongy moth (Lymantria dispar) was introduced from Europe into Massachusetts about 1861. The sweet potato weevil (Cylas formicarius) was first discovered in 1875. About 1892, the brown-tail moth (Euproctis chrysorhhoea) was introduced near Boston from Europe. The boll weevil (Anthonoma grandis) entered Texas about 1892 in the vicinity of Brownsville. The Argentine ant (Linepithema humile) was first discovered in the United States at New Orleans in 1891, and the alfalfa weevil (Hypera postica) was first discovered in Utah in 1904. Establishing control over an increasing number of insect pests and insect-borne diseases led to the establishment of the Bureau of Entomology.

== Duties of the Bureau of Entomology ==
=== Insect pests ===
The Bureau of Entomology conducted researches into the systematics and diversity of insects, and the methods which could reduce the spread and the frequency of occurrence of insect pests. It developed various approaches towards accomplishing its goals. The introduction of the natural enemies of insect pests has brought control of many insect pests.

=== Beneficial insects ===
Investigations of bee diseases, the greatest handicap with which the beekeeper has to deal, resulted in a number of discoveries. A disease of the brood which had often been mistaken for one of the foul broods and to which the name "sacbrood" is given was found to be due to a filterable virus. The deadly Isle of Wight disease of the adult bee, occurring in Great Britain and on the Continent, was discovered to be caused by the mite Acarapis woodi in the tracheæ, and an embargo was placed upon the importation of bees in order to prevent its introduction into the United States.

== Organization ==
As of 1930, the Bureau of Entomology was composed of the following Divisions:

General Administration

Deciduous-Fruit Insects Division

Cereal and Forage Insects Division

Cotton Insects Division

Forest Insects Division

Truck Crop Insects Division

Bee Culture Division

Stored Product Insects Division

Tropical, Subtropical and Ornamental Plants Insect Division

Insects Affecting Man and Animals Division

Taxonomy and Interrelation of Insects Division

These various units, located in Washington, around the U.S. and in other countries, employed hundreds of entomologists and support staff.

== Later developments ==
Resorting to legislative means, Congress enacted the Federal Plant Quarantine Act of August 20, 1912, which immediately became effective as to certain quarantines, and was administered by the Federal Horticultural Board, consisting of five members appointed by the Secretary of Agriculture. A quarantine against insect pests and diseases from abroad was established and maintained, inspectors having been stationed at every port of entry by land and sea. Quarantines were established within the United States against the spread of a number of important pests. The investigational and control work was carried on by the Federal government through the Bureau of Entomology and the Horticultural and Insecticide and Fungicide Boards. In the States the work was conducted by the experiment stations, State entomologists, and in several instances by crop pest commissions. The Federal Bureau of Entomology administered the work through its several divisions. In 1924 it had 83 field stations in 32 states and Territories and three foreign countries. Since 1972, quarantine inspections have been overseen by USDA APHIS.

Many States have enacted laws which have created State Boards of Entomology. The interstate spread of pests has been prevented to a large extent through State regulations requiring that nursery stock be free from infestation, and these are enforced by rigid State inspection.

== Later insect pests ==
=== Pink bollworm ===
In November, 1916, the occurrence of the pink bollworm in the Laguna district of Coahuila, Mexico, within 200 miles (322 km) of the Texas border, was discovered, and an embargo was placed upon the importation of Mexican cotton. Infestations were found in several counties in Texas and Louisiana. The infested areas were at once quarantined and eradication work was pressed with vigor under appropriations by Congress. The pink bollworm originated in India and has been spread to many cotton-producing nations by man.

=== European corn borer ===
Late in the year 1917 the widely distributed European and Asiatic pest Pyrausta nubilalis Hubn., a moth whose larva is a borer, was discovered to have become established in an area approximately of 100 square miles (259 km^{2}) in several counties in eastern Massachusetts, where it caused serious injury to corn and particularly to sweet corn. The European corn borer attacks all of the corn plant above ground except the leaf blades.

=== Japanese beetle ===
The green beetle Popillia japonica was introduced from Japan with nursery stock and became established near Riverton, N. J., where it was discovered in the summer of 1916. By the fall of 1922 an area of 773 square miles (2002 km^{2}) had become infested.

=== Oriental peach moth ===
The Oriental peach moth was first discovered in the District of Columbia in 1916. It is supposed to have been introduced with flowering cherry trees from Japan.

=== Pine shoot moth ===
The destructive pine shoot moth was discovered in 1914 to have been introduced from Europe and to have become established in 10 localities in three States from Massachusetts to Pennsylvania, and the following year from 20 localities in nine states, in none of which except on Long Island had it lasted for longer than two years.

=== Mediterranean fruit fly ===
The Mediterranean fruit fly was first discovered in Hawaii on the Island of Oahu in 1910. Its introduction into the Island of Bermuda many years earlier had destroyed the fruit-growing capacity of that island. Congress provided appropriations to prevent its spread to the mainland.

=== Some other insect pests ===
- European red mite
- European earwig
- European satin moth
- Australian tomato beetle
- Camphor thrips
- Pea moth
- Fruit-tree leaf roller
- Potato leaf hopper
- Codling moth

== Entomologists of the USDA Bureau of Entomology ==
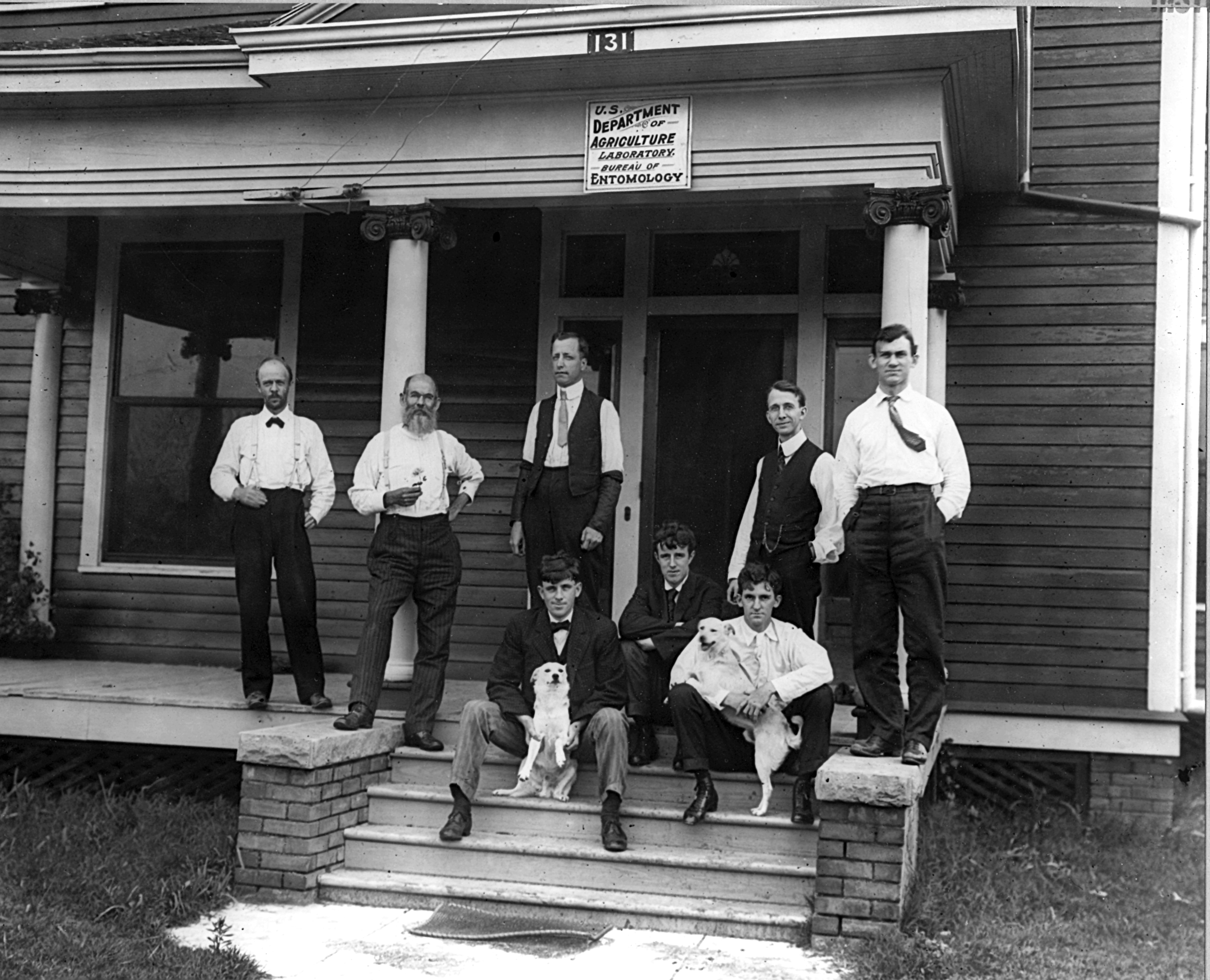
U.S. Department of Agriculture entomologists pose in front of their lab in Dallas, Texas in April 1908.

Some of the entomologists who worked at the Bureau of Entomology are: (years cited indicate employment by or primary affiliation with U.S. Department of Agriculture)

- John Merton Aldrich, dipterist, was stationed at the Lafayette, Indiana field station, 1913-1918, and worked in the USNM 1918-1934.
- Percy Nicol Annand, Cicadellidae, 1929-1950, Chief of the Bureau, 1941-1950.
- William Harris Ashmead, Hymenoptera, 1887-1908.
- Ernest Adna Back, Tephritidae, stored product pests, 1907-1947.
- Arthur Challen Baker, Aphididae and Tephritidae, 1911-1932.
- Nathan Banks, Acari, Heteroptera, 1890-1916.
- George Ware Barber, various pest insects, 1914-1945.
- Herbert Spencer Barber, Coleoptera, 1898-1950(?).William Stebbins Barnard, 1880-1885.
- Foster Hendrickson Benjamin, Lepidoptera, 1927-1936.
- Frank Benton, honeybees, 1891-1907.
- Fred Corry Bishopp, cotton pests, veterinary entomology 1903-1934
- Maulsby Willett Blackman, Scolytidae, 1925-1943.
- Adam Giede Böving, Coleoptera, 1913-1939.
- Albert Franklin Burgess, forest insects, 1907-1943.
- Harry E. Burke, forest insects, incl. Buprestidae larvae, 1902-1934.
- August Busck, microlepidopterist, 1896-1940.
- Frank Leslie Campbell, insect physiology, 1926-1934
- Andrew Nelson Caudell, Orthoptera, 1898-1936.
- Frank Hurlbut Chittenden, economic entomologist, 1891-1929.
- James Chamberlin Crawford, Hymenoptera, 1904-1919.
- Curtis Paul Clausen, biocontrol and parasitoids, 1914-1951.
- Daniel William Coquillet, Diptera, 1885-1911.
- Frank Cooper Craighead, Sr., Coleoptera, 1920-1957.
- James Chamberlain Crawford, Chalcidoidea, 1904-1919, 1930-1951.
- Rolla Patteson Currie, Myrmeliontidae, Odonata, 1898-1944.
- Robert Asa Cushman, hymenopteran parasitoids, 1906-1944.
- Harrison Gray Dyar, Jr., dipterist/lepidopterist affiliated with but not employed by USDA, 1897-1929.
- Henry Ellsworth Ewing, Acarina, 1919-1945.
- Bernhard Edward Fernow, forest insects, (Head, USDA Division of Forestry, 1886-1898).
- William Dewitt Field, Lepidoptera, 1940-1946 (subsequently a Smithsonian curator)
- Warren Samuel Fisher, forest Coleoptera, 1912-1948.
- Justus Watson Folsom, cotton pests, 1925-1936.
- Stanley Black Fracker, plant quarantine issues, 1927-1934.
- Arthur Burton Gahan, hymenopteran parasitoids, 1913-1950(?).
- Edmund H. Gibson, honorary custodian of Hemiptera, 1915-1920
- John Enos Graf, vegetable crops, 1911-1931.
- Charles Tull Greene, Diptera, 1912-1934
- Ashley Buell Gurney, orthopteroids, 1935-1975
- Otto Heidemann, Hemiptera, 1897-1916.
- Carl Heinrich, Lepidoptera, 1913-1949.
- Andrew Delmar Hopkins, forest entomologist, 1904-1923.
- Leland Ossian Howard led the Bureau of Entomology from its inception in 1894 until 1927.
- Henry Guernsey Hubbard, subtropical agriculture, 1880-1899.
- Walter David Hunter, locusts, boll weevil, 1901-1925.
- James Augusus Hyslop, Elateridae, (1911- ~1950)
- Thomas Henry Jones, Hemiptera, forest insects (1909-1941)
- Frederick Knab, dipterist, 1906-1918.
- Albert Koebele, Hymenoptera, 1881-1893.
- Walter Harrison Larrimer, cereal and forage crop pests, 1913-1935.
- John Russell Malloch, Diptera, 1912-1913 (later worked for U.S. Biological Survey).
- Benjamin Pickman Mann, 1881-1887.
- William M. Mann, Formicidae, 1917-1925.
- Charles Lester Marlatt, Coccidae, Cicadidae, Symphyta, 1889-1938.
- George Marx, Arachnida, 1878-1895.
- Norman Eugene McIndoo, insect physiology, 1911-1945.
- William Middleton, Symphyta, 1909-1934.
- Harold Morrison, Coccoidea, 1919-1960.
- Carl Frederick William Muesebeck, Hymenoptera, 1916-1918, 1919-1954.
- Theodore Pergande, Aphididae, 1878-1916.
- Everett Franklin Phillips, apiculture, 1905-1924.
- Bennet Allen Porter, fruit insects, 1915-1934.
- Altus Lacey Quaintance, Aleyrodidae, 1903-1930.
- Sievert Allen Rohwer, Hymenoptera, 1909-1951.
- Grace Adalbert Sandhouse, who studied Apoidea, worked at the Bureau from 1926 until her death in 1940.
- Ernest Ralph Sasscer, scale insects, 1904-1953.
- William Schaus, Lepidoptera, 1919-1938.
- Eugene Amandus Schwarz, Coleoptera, 1878-1926.
- John Bernhardt Smith, Lepidoptera, 1884-1886 (subsequently Smithsonian assistant curator, 1886-1889).
- Robert Evans Snodgrass, insect anatomy and morphology, 1906-1910, 1917-1945
- Thomas Elliot Snyder, Isoptera, 1909-1934.
- Lillie Sullivan, scientific illustrator, 1880-1903.
- William Robin Thompson, Tachinidae,1909-1914.
- Charles Henry Tyler Townsend, Diptera, 1887-1891, 1894-1899, 1906-1919.
- Joseph Sanford Wade, Coleoptera, 1913-1961.
- Claude Wakeland, range pests, 1938-1958.
- William Randolph Walton, Diptera, 1910-1943.
- Francis Marion Webster, insect pests of grain, 1882-1916.
- Charles Adolph Weigel, ornamental plant pests, 1918-1928.
- Lewis Hart Weld , Cynipidae, 1919-1924 (resigned, but continued affiliation with USDA until at least 1950.
- Franklin Gershom White, bee diseases, 1907-1937.
