= Theodore Pergande =

German-born entomologist

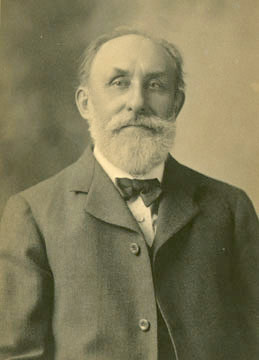
- Born: 28 December 1840; Germany
- Died: 23 March 1916 (aged 75)
- Occupation: entomologist
- Known for: member, Entomological Society of Washington
- Notable work: observations on aphids, thrips, ants

Theodore Pergande (28 December 1840 – 23 March 1916) was a German-born American entomological pioneer known for his skills in rearing insects. He made careful observations on aphids and thrips and made collections and studies on North American ants, several of which, including the harvester ant Veromessor pergandei and the scale insect Parlatoria pergandii, have been named after him.

== Biography ==
Pergande was born in Germany and moved to the United States at the beginning of the American Civil War and served in the northern army. He had worked for a while as a mechanic in a gun works factory in Stettin and left Germany ostensibly to avoid marrying a girl from a Catholic family. After the war, he lived in St. Louis where he married a German, worked in a gun-making company, and collected insects on weekends. On one of his weekend collecting trips, he met Otto Lugger who was then retiring. Lugger recommended Pergande as an assistant to C.V. Riley, state entomologist in Missouri. When Riley moved to the US Department of Entomology, he took Pergande along. Pergande described many species of insects and was in-charge of rearing insects and was noted for his care in mounting specimens. Pergande was among the oldest members of the Entomological Society of Washington and was among the several other influential entomologists of German origin along with Hermann August Hagen, Eugene Amandus Schwarz, George Marx, A.J. Schafhirt, Otto Heidemann, Frederick Knab and Albert Koebele.
