= Entomological Society of Washington =

Scientific society

The Entomological Society of Washington was organized on February 29, 1884 at a meeting called by three entomologists employed by the U.S. Department of Agriculture: Charles Valentine Riley, Eugene Amandus Schwarz, and Leland Ossian Howard, in Riley's home in Washington, D.C. Meetings have been held regularly since 1884. Several local locations were used as meeting places after it became impractical to hold meetings in members' homes, including the Washington Saengerbund Hall, the Cosmos Club, and the National Museum of Natural History of the Smithsonian Institution.

The official seal of the society was adopted at the society's November 2, 1893 meeting and first appeared in March 1894. The insect featured in the seal is a winged male Rheumatobates rileyi Bergroth (Hemiptera, Gerridae), a water strider about 7 mm long including outstretched legs.

Early members included Charles Valentine Riley, Eugene Amandus Schwarz, Leland Ossian Howard, August Busck, Adam Giede Böving, Charles Henry Tyler Townsend, Nathan Banks, Lawrence Bruner, George Marx, Frederick Knab, Albert Koebele, Clara Southmayd Ludlow, Harrison Gray Dyar Jr., and others. As greater numbers of women became active in entomology, their contributions have been reflected in the Society's membership and elected officers. In 1966, Louise M. Russell became the first woman to serve as the society's President.

== Publication ==
In March 1886, the society began publishing the Proceedings of the Entomological Society of Washington. Of the dozens of entomological societies that have existed for varying periods, only three in the Americas having continued uninterrupted publication of their periodicals are older than the Entomological Society of Washington.
