= Albert Burgess =

Albert Burgess may refer to:

- Albert Franklin Burgess, American entomologist
- Sonny Burgess (1929–2017), American musician
- Cam Burgess (1919–1978), English footballer
