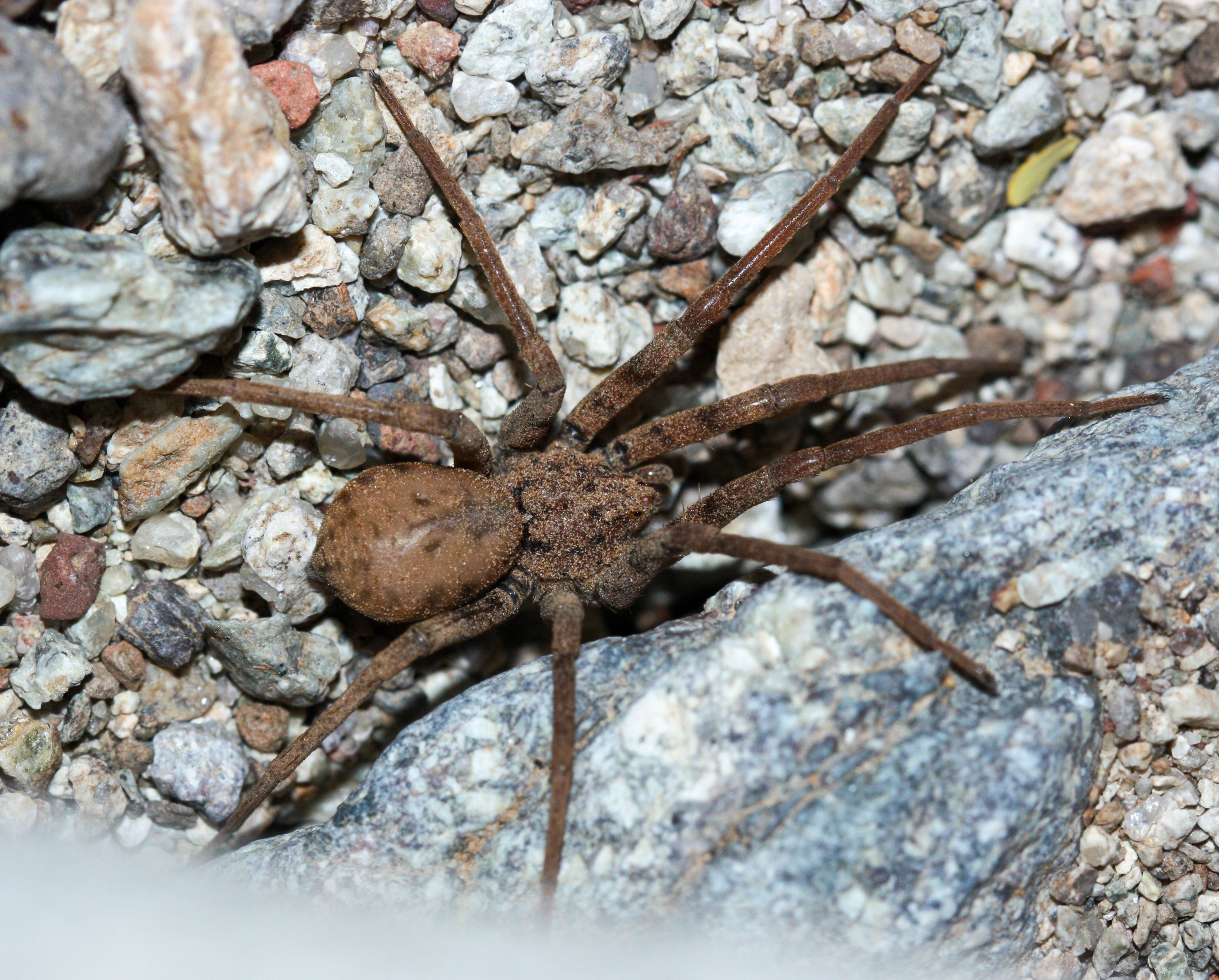
- H. selenopoides
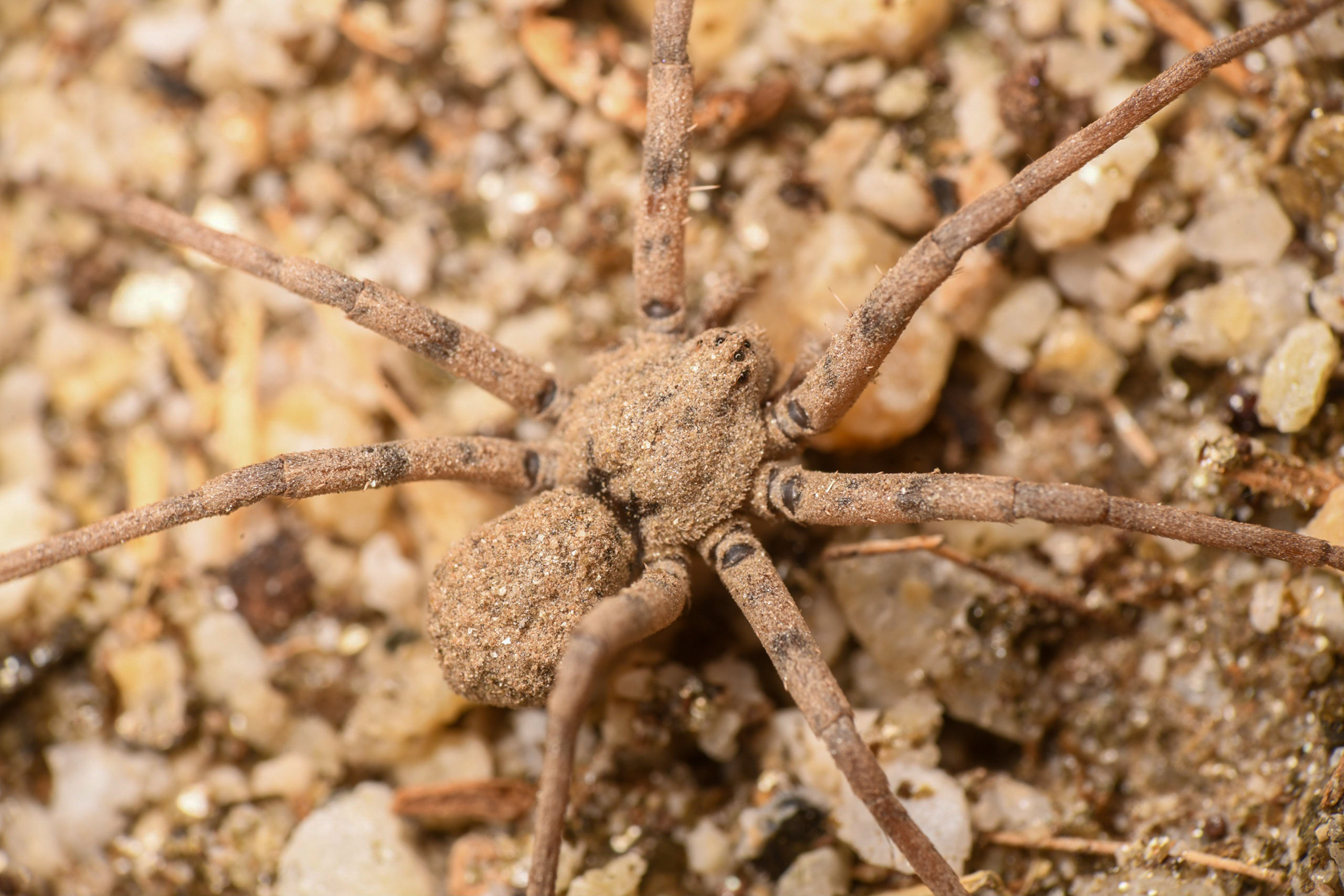
- H. theologus

Scientific classification
- Kingdom: Animalia
- Phylum: Arthropoda
- Subphylum: Chelicerata
- Class: Arachnida
- Order: Araneae
- Infraorder: Araneomorphae
- Family: Homalonychidae; Simon, 1893
- Genus: Homalonychus; Marx, 1891

Type species
- H. selenopoides Marx, 1891

Species
- H. selenopoides Marx, 1891 — USA, Mexico; H. theologus Chamberlin, 1924 — USA, Mexico

= Homalonychus =

Genus of spiders

Homalonychus is a genus of araneomorph spiders, and is the only genus in the family Homalonychidae. It was first described by George Marx in 1891. Its two described species are found in the southern United States and Mexico: H. theologus is mostly found west of the Colorado River, while H. selenopoides is mostly found to the east, with some populations in Death Valley and near Mercury, Nevada.

They do not build webs, and are typically found under rocks or dead vegetation. At least the two North American species live in deserts, to which they are adapted by color and specialized setae which allow them to attach sand and fine soil to themselves. They also partially bury themselves.

== Species ==
As of October 2025, this genus includes two species:

- Homalonychus selenopoides Marx, 1891 – United States, Mexico (type species)
- Homalonychus theologus Chamberlin, 1924 – United States, Mexico
