= Monoblastus =

Monoblastus may refer to:

- Monoblastus (insect), a genus of wasps in the family Ichneumonidae
- Monoblastus, a fossil genus of echinoderms without unknown classification and with unknown validity of the taxon name
