= Monoblastus clauseni =

Scientific classification
- Domain: Eukaryota
- Kingdom: Animalia
- Phylum: Arthropoda
- Class: Insecta
- Order: Hymenoptera
- Family: Ichneumonidae
- Genus: Monoblastus
- Species: M. clauseni

Binomial name
- Monoblastus clauseni Uchida, 1930

Synonyms
- Polyrhysia clauseni Uchida, 1930 Tryphon satoi Uchida, 1955; Tryphon clauseni Uchida, 1955

Species of insect

Monoblastus clauseni is a species of parasitoid wasp belonging to the family Ichneumonidae.

It was first described in 1930 as Polyrhysia clauseni by the Japanese entomologist, Toichi Uchida, from a specimen collected in Korea in June 1928 by C.P. Clausen, whom the species epithet honours.

in 1955, Uchida described the species, Tryphon satoi, which Kasparyan synonymised in 1973 to Monoblastus clauseni. In the same article Uchida also described Tryphon clauseni which was synonymised in 1965 with Tryphon satoi by Townes, Momoi & Townes. Japanese taxonomists give Tryphon (Stenocrotaphon) nagahamensis Uchida, 1930 as the accepted name.

The wasp is native to the Korean peninsula, where the type specimen was collected, and if Kasparyan's synonymisation is accepted, it is also found in Russia.
