= Francis Marion Webster =

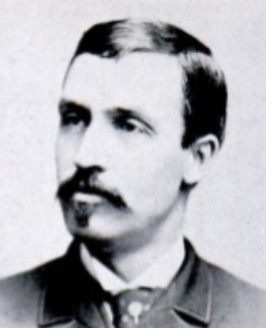

Francis Marion Webster (August 8, 1849 – January 3, 1916) was an American agricultural entomologist who worked for the US Department of Agriculture. He served as an entomologist at the Ohio State Experiment station from 1891 to 1902.

== Life and work ==
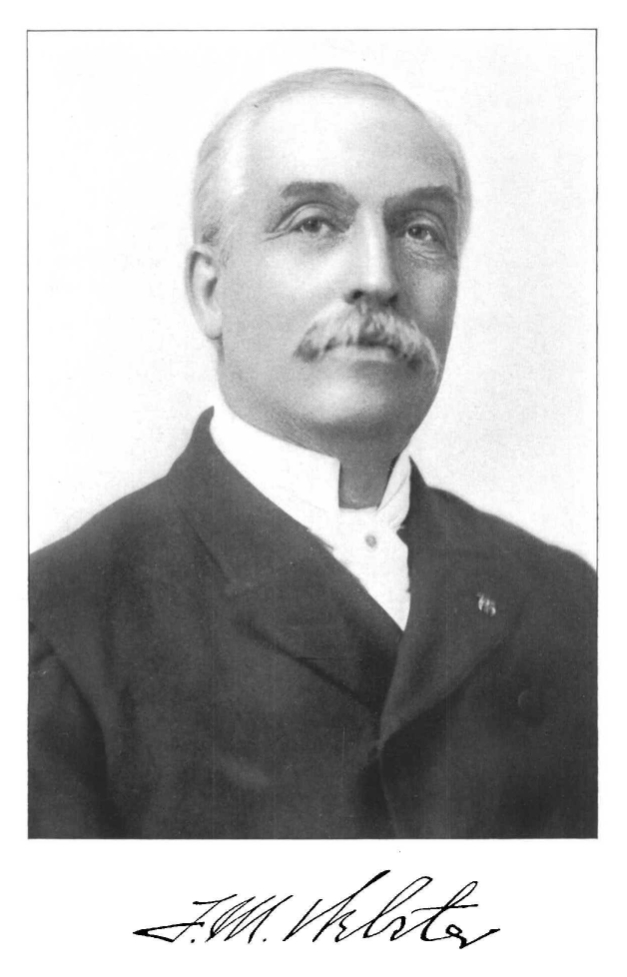

Webster was born in Lebanon, New Hampshire and grew up in De Kalb county on a family farm. His father died when Webster was just fifteen and he was not able to obtain further education. He married at 21 and worked in Sandwich after which he bought a farm. He wrote his first entomological publication in 1874 in the Chicago Weekly Interocean. He was posted assistant state entomologist for Illinois in 1882 and worked for two years on the insects of cereal and forage crops. From 1884, he worked as a field agent for the US Department of Agriculture and was involved in a range of investigations. He worked under C. V. Riley. He studied wheat insects in Illinois then went to La Fayette in 1884. In 1886 he studied buffalo gnats in Mississippi and Louisiana. In 1888 he was sent to Melbourne to study agriculture in Australia along with Albert Koeble. In 1891 he joined the Ohio State Experiment Station in Columbus where he began studies on insects such as the Hessian fly. He also studied aphid-ant interactions. He received an honorary degree of Master of Science from Ohio University, Athens. In 1903 he worked for the Illinois Biological Survey. He trained numerous entomologists. He died from pneumonia when he was visiting Columbus, Ohio, to attend a meeting of the American Association for the Advancement of Science. He was elected president of the Entomological Society of America shortly before his death. He was survived by his wife Maria née Potter (m. 1870) and their two daughters and three sons.
