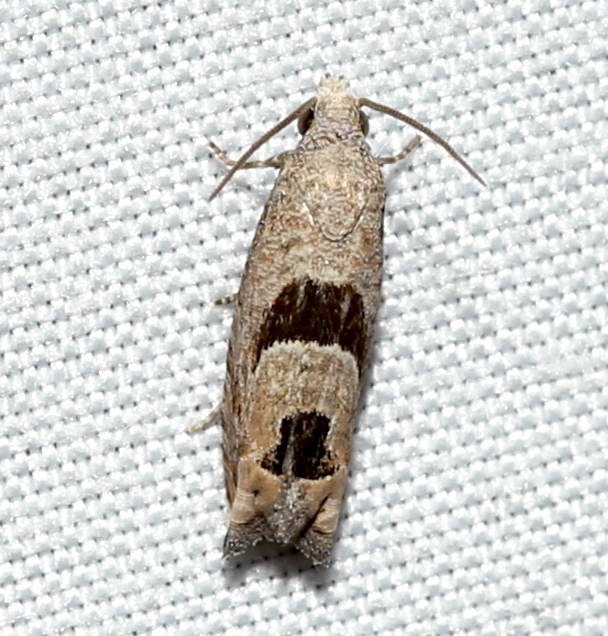
- Adult
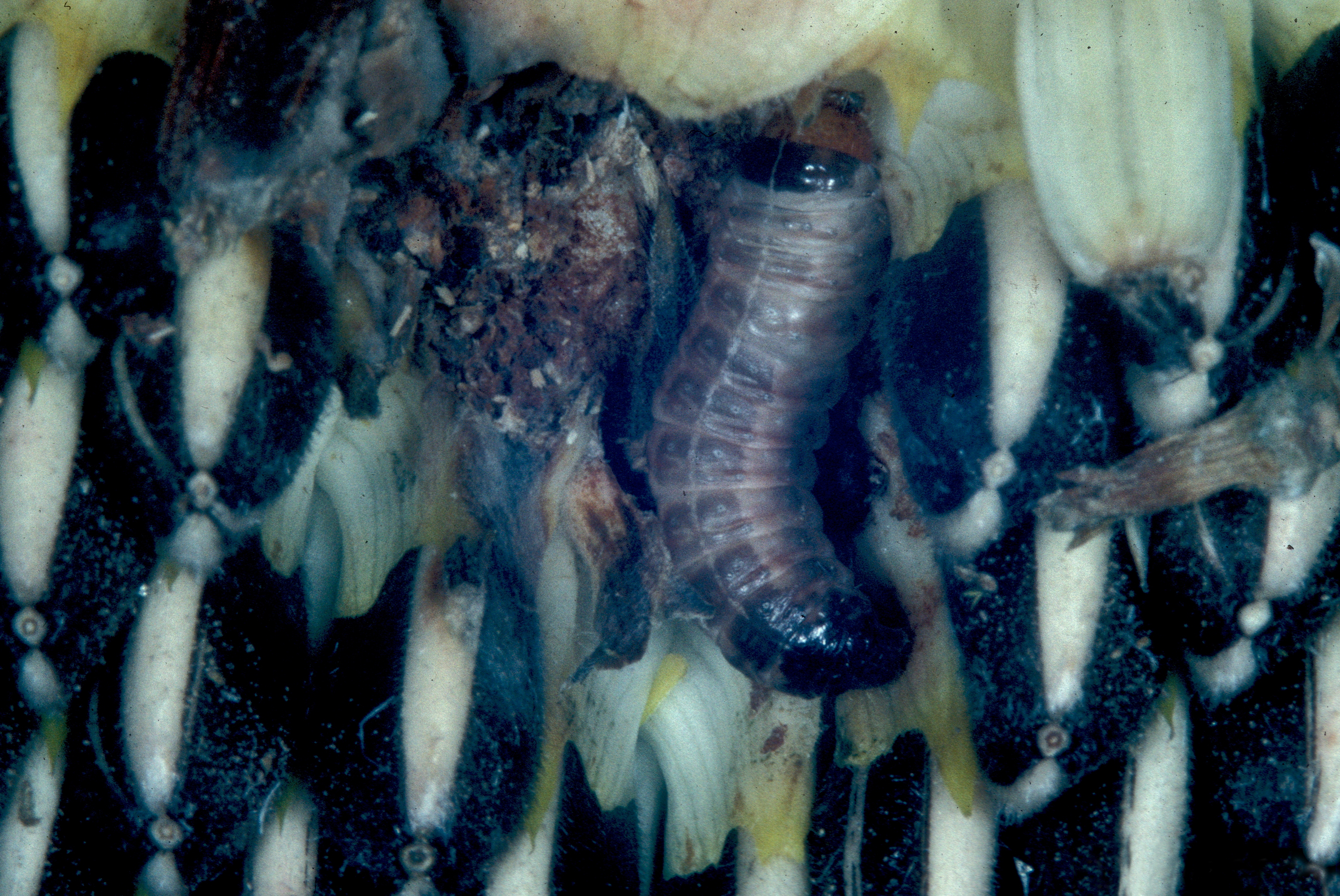
- Larva

Scientific classification
- Kingdom: Animalia
- Phylum: Arthropoda
- Class: Insecta
- Order: Lepidoptera
- Family: Tortricidae
- Genus: Suleima
- Species: S. helianthana

Binomial name
- Suleima helianthana (Riley, 1881)

Synonyms
- Semasia helianthana Riley, 1881

= Suleima helianthana =

Species of moth

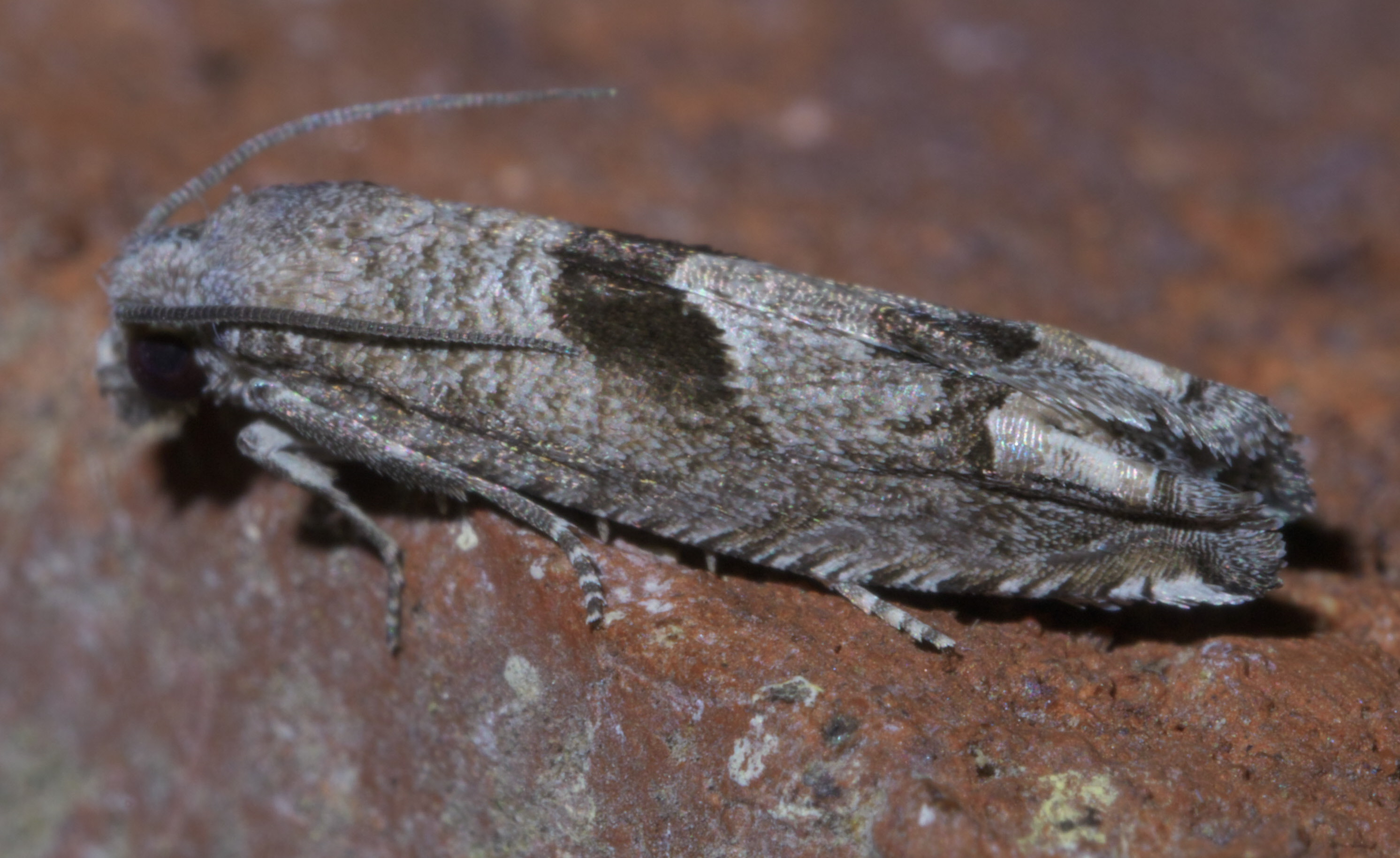
Suleima helianthana, sunflower bud moth, size: 9.6 mm

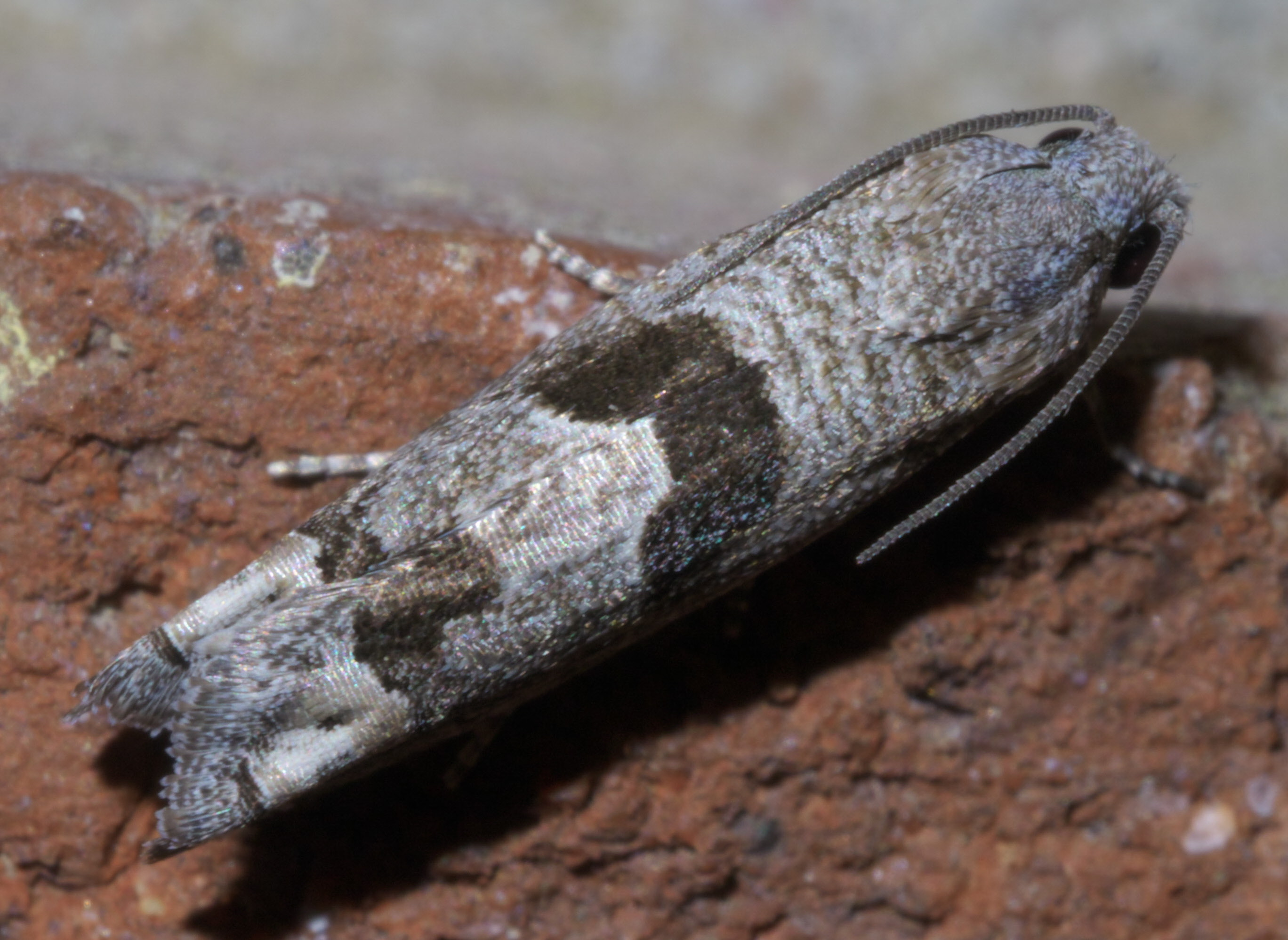
Suleima helianthana, sunflower bud moth, size: 9.6 mm

Suleima helianthana, the sunflower bud moth, is a species of moth of the family Tortricidae. It is found in central North America, from Mexico to Canada.

The wingspan is about 17 mm. It is a variable species. There are two generations per year.

The larvae feed on Helianthus species. They tunnel into the stalks and buds of their host plant.
