= Lillie Sullivan =

American scientific illustrator (1855–1903)

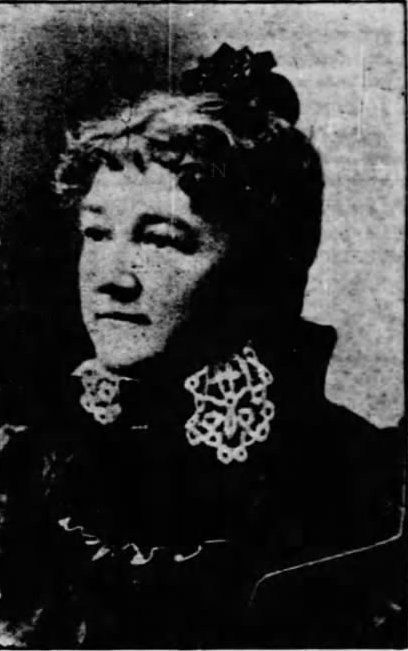
Lillie Sullivan, from her obituary in The Evening Star (June 27, 1903)

Lillie Sullivan (1855–1903) was an American scientific illustrator. At the time of her death, she was the best known illustrator on entomological subjects in the United States, and was for the last twenty years of her life employed in that capacity by the Federal Government in Washington, D.C.

== Life ==
=== Origins ===
Lillie Sullivan was a daughter of Luther O. Sullivan and a sister of Frederick Sullivan, the New York artist, who was for some time employed on one of the local Washington papers.

=== Career ===
Sullivan was appointed an artist in the Bureau of Entomology of the Department of Agriculture by C. V. Riley, former Chief of the Bureau, in 1880, and held her position up to the time of her death. Sullivan became the best known illustrator of entomological subjects in the United States. She was an artist of some little ability before taking up the study of entomology, in order that she might perfect herself in her chosen line of work. She painted many pictures that were given places of honor in private residences in Washington, and was well known throughout that part of the country for the work she had done outside of her government office. As an illustrator of insects, however, her name became known throughout the world, and her drawings were regarded as models of the best type of such work. She was able to draw the insect, not only from the outward appearance of the model given her, but from the intimate knowledge she possessed of the anatomy of almost every species of insect. She was able to reproduce the bug or beetle as it should be. Her work, either with pen and ink or with colors, attracted attention throughout the United States, her illustrations appearing in almost every publication of the department which related to entomology.

=== Death ===
Sullivan died, unmarried, at her home, 1304 R Street North-west, in Washington, D.C., on the evening of June 26, 1903, shortly after 7 o'clock, as a result of a stroke of paralysis suffered earlier In the day. The sudden death came as a shock to her many friends and her associates at the Department of Agriculture. She was in the best of health, apparently, the previous morning and was at her post as usual in the office of C. L Marlatt, acting Chief of the Division of Entomology. About 11 o'clock, while Sullivan was at work on a drawing for F. H. Chittenden, entomologist in charge of breeding experiments, she turned toward Merlatt, who was talking with Chittenden, and said she believed she was going to be ill. Previous to this she had executed a very difficult piece of work for Chittenden, and he had complimented her on her skill. She appeared at that time to be in the best of health and spirits, and said she liked to get hold of specimens that were difficult to draw. At the time when she complained of feeling badly, Chittenden and his Chief attempted to reassure her and at the same time asked her what was troubling her. She told them she had lost the use of her left arm and believed that the paralysis extended over her left side. Chittenden felt her pulse and found it to be normal. He could see, however, that Sullivan was becoming very ill. A cab was called and she was sent home at her own suggestion, accompanied by Mr. Clifton, one of the clerks In the office. Upon reaching home she became rapidly worse. The paralysis extended over her left side, and she was rendered almost helpless, growing weaker and weaker, until the end came at 7 o'clock. Lillie Sullivan lived with her sister, E. Sullivan, and her mother, Eliza Sullivan. They were completely prostrated at her sudden demise. She was interred in Glenwood Cemetery the following Monday.
