= Henry Guernsey Hubbard =

American botanist and entomologist (1850–1899)

Henry Guernsey Hubbard (May 6, 1850 – January 18, 1899) was an American entomologist and horticulturist. He was both a field entomologist and an applied entomologist. He is most noted for the work he did to identify and control the agricultural pests in the Florida citrus industry. He was also an early pioneer in the study of cave insects.

== Biography ==
Hubbard was born on May 6, 1850, in Detroit, Michigan. His parents were Bela Hubbard and Sarah (Baughman) Hubbard. Bela was a native of Hamilton, N. Y. and in 1835 moved to Michigan where he became a prominent and wealthy citizen of Detroit. Bela had a strong scientific interest in geology, botany, forestry, arboriculture, and archaeology. This interest was passed along to his oldest son, Henry, who became familiar with the habits of the wild creatures in the neighborhood of Detroit at an early age.

Henry Hubbard was educated at a private school in Cambridge, Massachusetts and then spent several years studying with private tutors in Europe. He entered Harvard University in 1869 and worked closely with Hermann August Hagen, Carl Robert Osten-Sacken, and especially Eugene Amandus Schwarz, who became Hubbard's lifelong friend. Under their influence he was determined to become an entomologist when he graduated in 1873. After graduation, he briefly spent time as a post-graduate working under Hagen to study the hibernation of Coleoptera (beetles) during winter.

In May, 1874, he returned to Detroit with Schwarz to start a private museum and form a great collection of beetles. In company with Schwarz, they made several collecting trips in and around Detroit in 1874, through Florida in 1875, and then, in 1876, a series of expeditions to the region of Lake Superior. The collection they built was reviewed favorably by the entomologists attending the annual meeting of the American Association for the Advancement of Science, held in Detroit in 1875. John Lawrence LeConte, the noted coleopterist, declared that the wealth of new specimens would force him to adjust parts of his beetle classification scheme.

While on a trip with his uncle in 1877, Hubbard studied and collected termites in Jamaica. He next joined the Geological Survey of Kentucky as a naturalist in 1879, studying the fauna of Mammoth Cave and other caves in the region. The resulting paper, Two Days' Collecting in the Mammoth Cave (1880) was said to mark the beginning of the scientific study of cave life. He later wrote about cave fauna in Jamaica (1880) and Florida (1901). Other papers he published expressed a similar interest in the assemblages of insects found in unique micro-habitats such as tortoise burrows (1894), Yellowstone hot springs (1891), saguaro cactus (1899) and desert rodent burrows (1901).

When two of his brothers were drowned in a boating accident on Lake St. Clair in 1879, Hubbard moved to Crescent City, Florida where one of the brothers had owned an estate. Hubbard designed and built a home on the property and lived there for several years. He created a beautiful subtropical garden around the home which became famous as "Hubbard Park". The Hubbard House still stands and was placed on the National Register of Historic Places. The surrounding gardens no longer exist.

In 1880, Hubbard was appointed a special agent for the United States Entomological Commission and he began an intensive study of the insect pests affecting the Florida citrus crops. In 1885 he published his best-known work, Insects Affecting the Orange. It remained the standard authority for many years and was praised as one of the most careful studies of insect pests yet published. He also developed a kerosene-soap emulsion that proved to be an effective control for scale insects and other citrus pests.

For the next few years he devoted himself to horticultural work, developing his garden and consulting with other horticulturalists. By 1889 he rededicated himself to entomology and made several collecting trips across the country. In 1889 he revisited Lake Superior; in 1890 Montana; in 1891 he and Schwarz traveled to the Wasatch Mountains in Utah, Lake Tahoe in California, and Yellowstone Park; and in 1892 they visited Oregon, Washington and British Columbia. In 1894 he accompanied Charles Valentine Riley on a collecting trip to the British West Indies. After Florida's "Great Freeze" in 1896, Hubbard studied the ambrosia beetles that infested the dead and dying citrus trees.

By 1896 Hubbard's health had declined significantly from tuberculosis that had infected him for several years. In an effort to improve his health, he spent much of his time in Arizona in 1897 and 1898, studying insects with his friend Schwarz. However, his health continued to deteriorate and he died in Florida on January 19, 1899.

Hubbard married Kate Lasier in 1887 and together they had four children.

== Selected works ==
Hubbard published approximately 68 papers, including:

- 1877: Notes on the tree nests of termites in Jamaica.
- 1878: (with Schwarz, E.A) The Coleoptera of Michigan.
- 1880: Two Days' Collecting in the Mammoth Cave.
- 1885: Insects Affecting the Orange
- 1891: Insect Life in the Hot Springs of Yellowstone National Park.
- 1894: The Insect Guests of the Florida Land Tortoise.
- 1897: The Ambrosia Beetles of the United States.
