= Monoblastus forsythia =

Scientific classification
- Domain: Eukaryota
- Kingdom: Animalia
- Phylum: Arthropoda
- Class: Insecta
- Order: Hymenoptera
- Family: Ichneumonidae
- Genus: Monoblastus
- Species: M. forsythia

Binomial name
- Monoblastus forsythia Choi, 2023

Species of insect

Monoblastus forsythia is a species of parasitoid wasp belonging to the family Ichneumonidae.

It was first described in 2023 by Jin-Kyung Choi. The species epithet, forsythia, was given because the holotype was collected from the plant Forsythia koreana.

This wasp is endemic to the Korean peninsula.

== Description ==
The female has fore wings that are 6.5 mm (5.5-6.5 mm) long, and a body length of 7.5 mm (6.2-7.5 mm). Her head is black, her mandible is yellow and the apical part is black.
