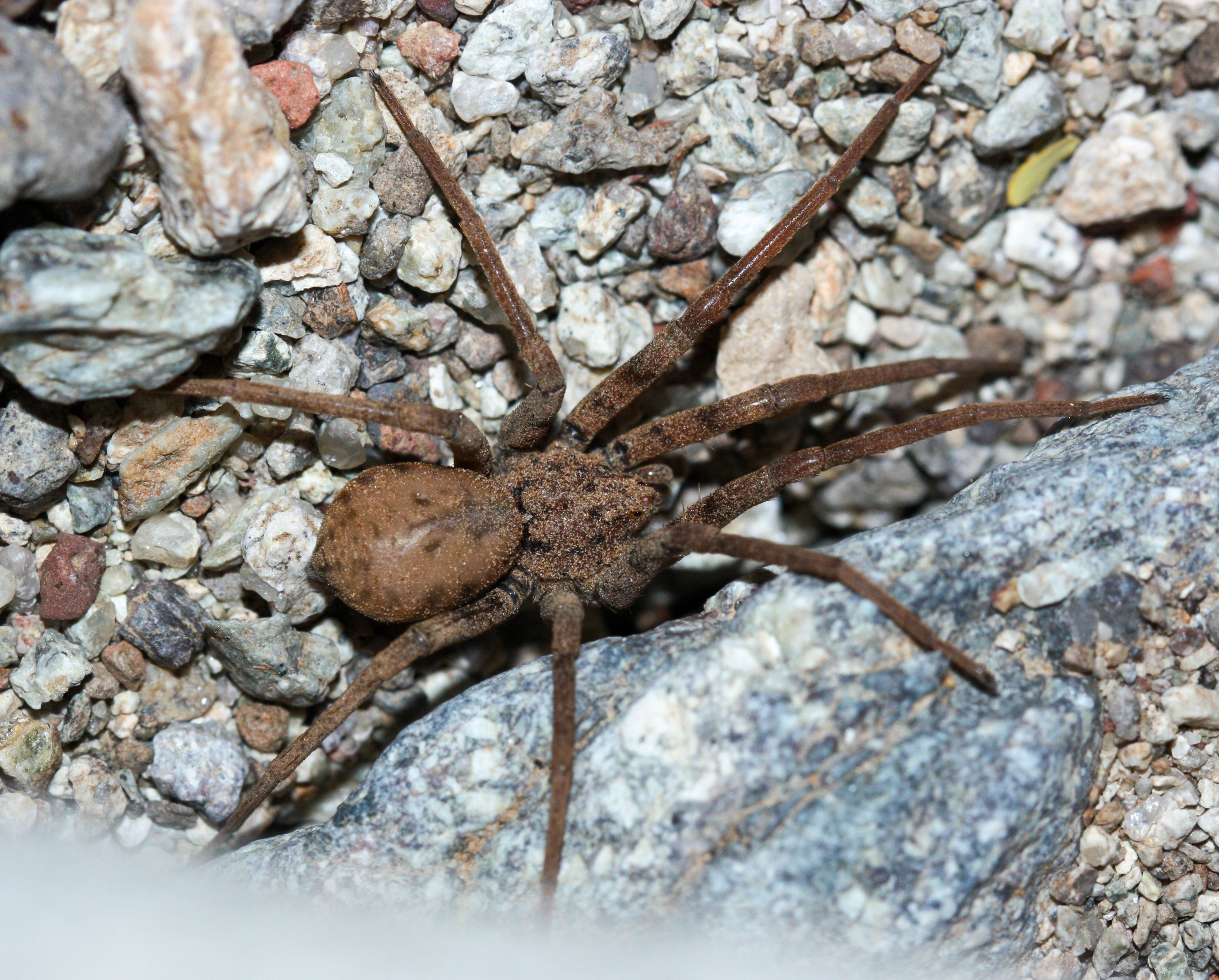
- H. selenopoides
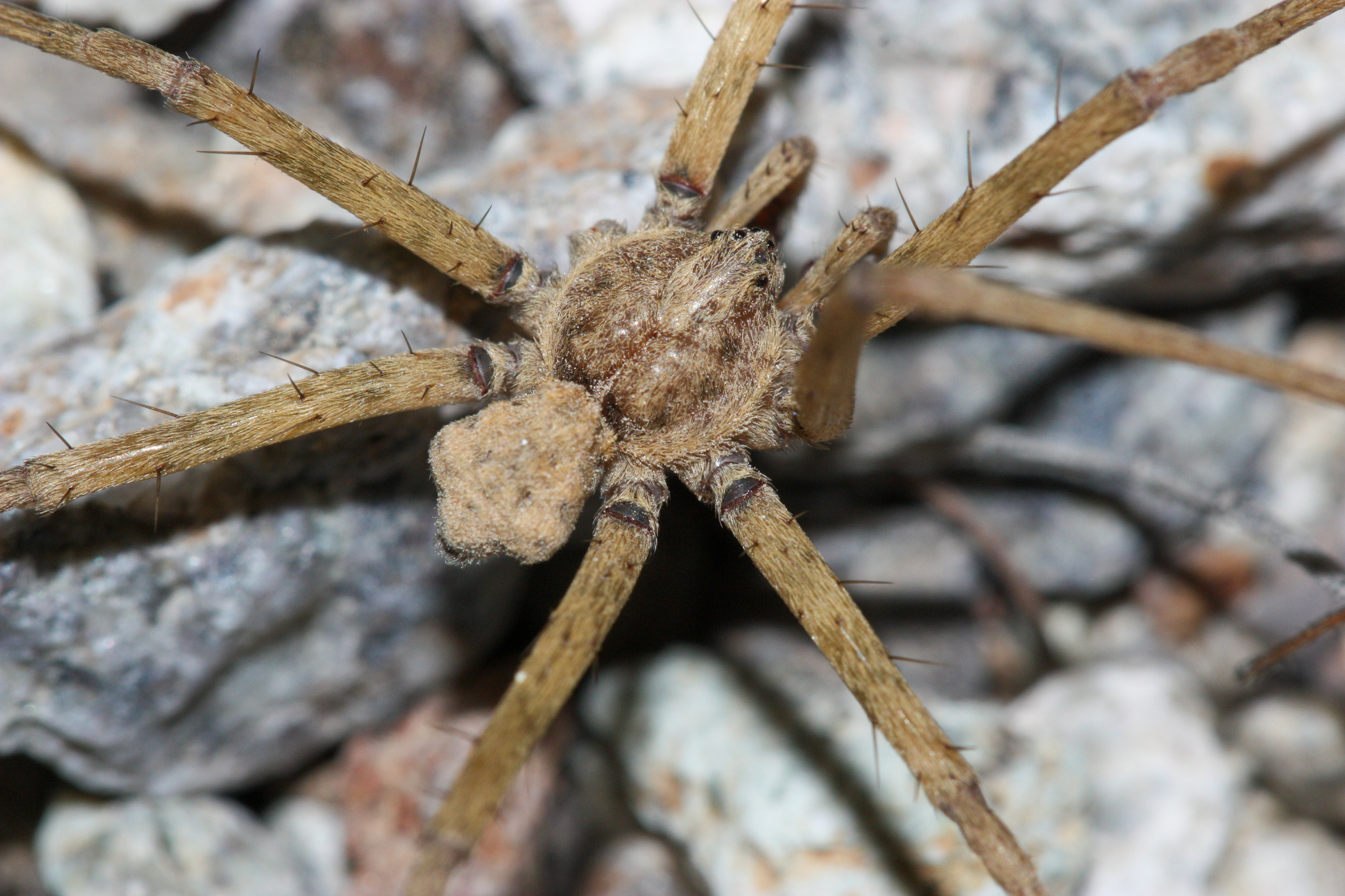
- male

Scientific classification
- Kingdom: Animalia
- Phylum: Arthropoda
- Subphylum: Chelicerata
- Class: Arachnida
- Order: Araneae
- Infraorder: Araneomorphae
- Family: Homalonychidae
- Genus: Homalonychus
- Species: H. selenopoides

Binomial name
- Homalonychus selenopoides Marx, 1891

= Homalonychus selenopoides =

Species of spider

Homalonychus selenopoides is a species of true spider in the family Homalonychidae. It is found in the United States and Mexico, specifically in the Sonoran Desert. During courtship, males spin threads with sand grains embedded in them, then approach the female. During mating itself, the male drums on the ground using its first two pairs of legs. Females also incorporate sand in the spinning of their egg-sac.
