= August Busck =

Danish entomologist (1870–1944)

Augustus Busck (February 18, 1870 in Randers, Denmark – March 7, 1944) was a Danish-American entomologist with the United States Department of Agriculture's Bureau of Entomology, stationed in the U.S. National Museum. He began as an assistant to Theodore Pergrande in 1896, and stayed with the Division of Entomology, embedded in the U.S. National Museum, until his retirement in 1940, He is best known for his work with microlepidoptera, of which he described over 600 species. His collections of Lepidoptera from North America and the Panama Canal Zone are held by the National Museum of Natural History in Washington, D.C.

== Publications ==
Busck authored and co-authored over 150 papers, among them:

- 1902: A list of the North American Lepidoptera and key to the literature of this order of insects. Harrison Gray Dyar Jr.; assisted by Charles H. Fernald, Ph.D., the late Rev. George Duryea Hulst, and August Busck. Bulletin of the United States National Museum: 52.
- 1911: Descriptions of tineoid moths (Microlepidoptera) from South America. Proceedings of the United States National Museum, Volume 40, Issue: 1815:205–230.
- 1915: with Lord Walsingham, Volume IV (1909–1915) of Biologia Centrali-Americana.
