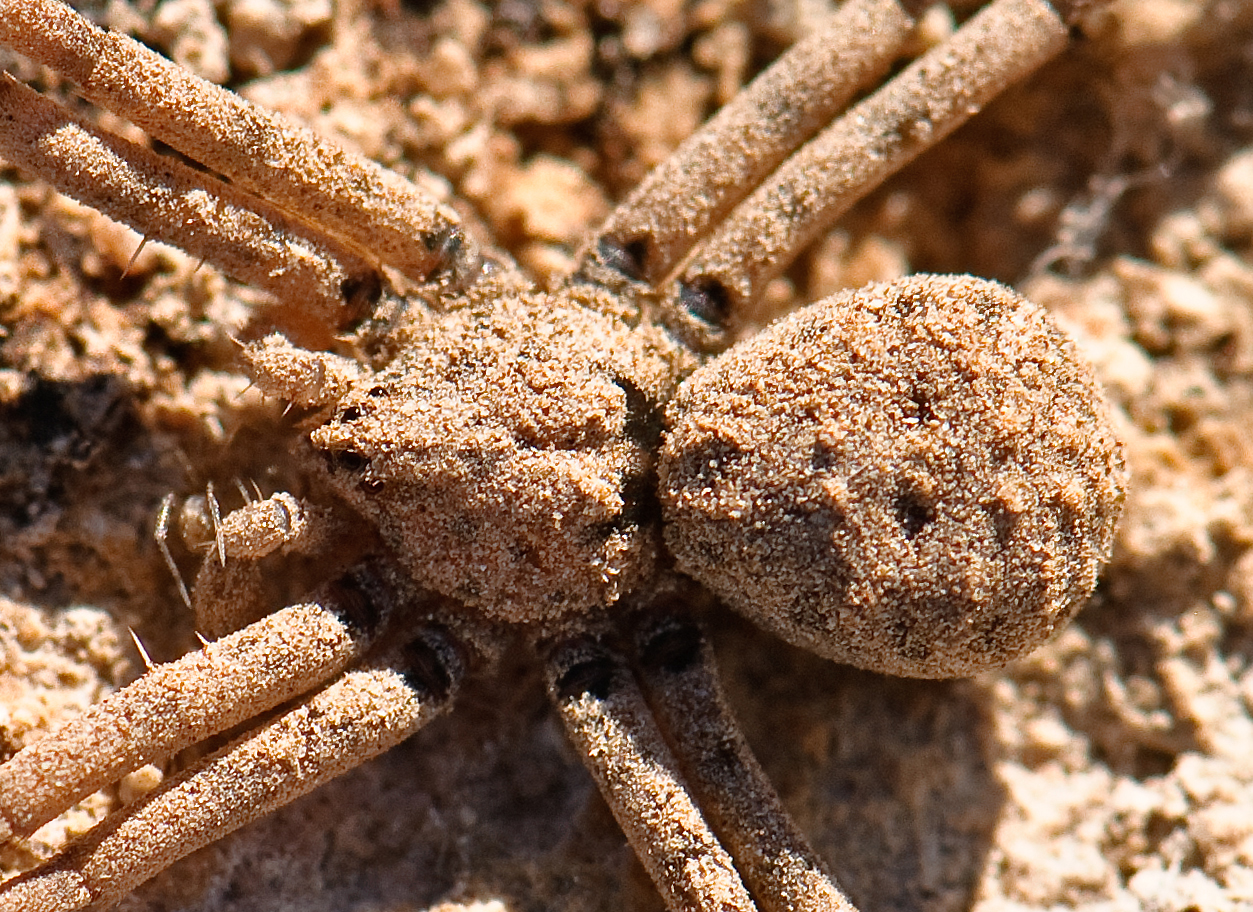

Scientific classification
- Kingdom: Animalia
- Phylum: Arthropoda
- Subphylum: Chelicerata
- Class: Arachnida
- Order: Araneae
- Infraorder: Araneomorphae
- Family: Homalonychidae
- Genus: Homalonychus
- Species: H. theologus

Binomial name
- Homalonychus theologus Chamberlin, 1924

= Homalonychus theologus =

Species of spider

Homalonychus theologus is a species of true spider in the family Homalonychidae. It is found in the United States and Mexico. The spiders camouflage themselves by covering themselves with sand when molting, and typically can be found under rocks or, if rocks are not found in the habitat, dead cacti.

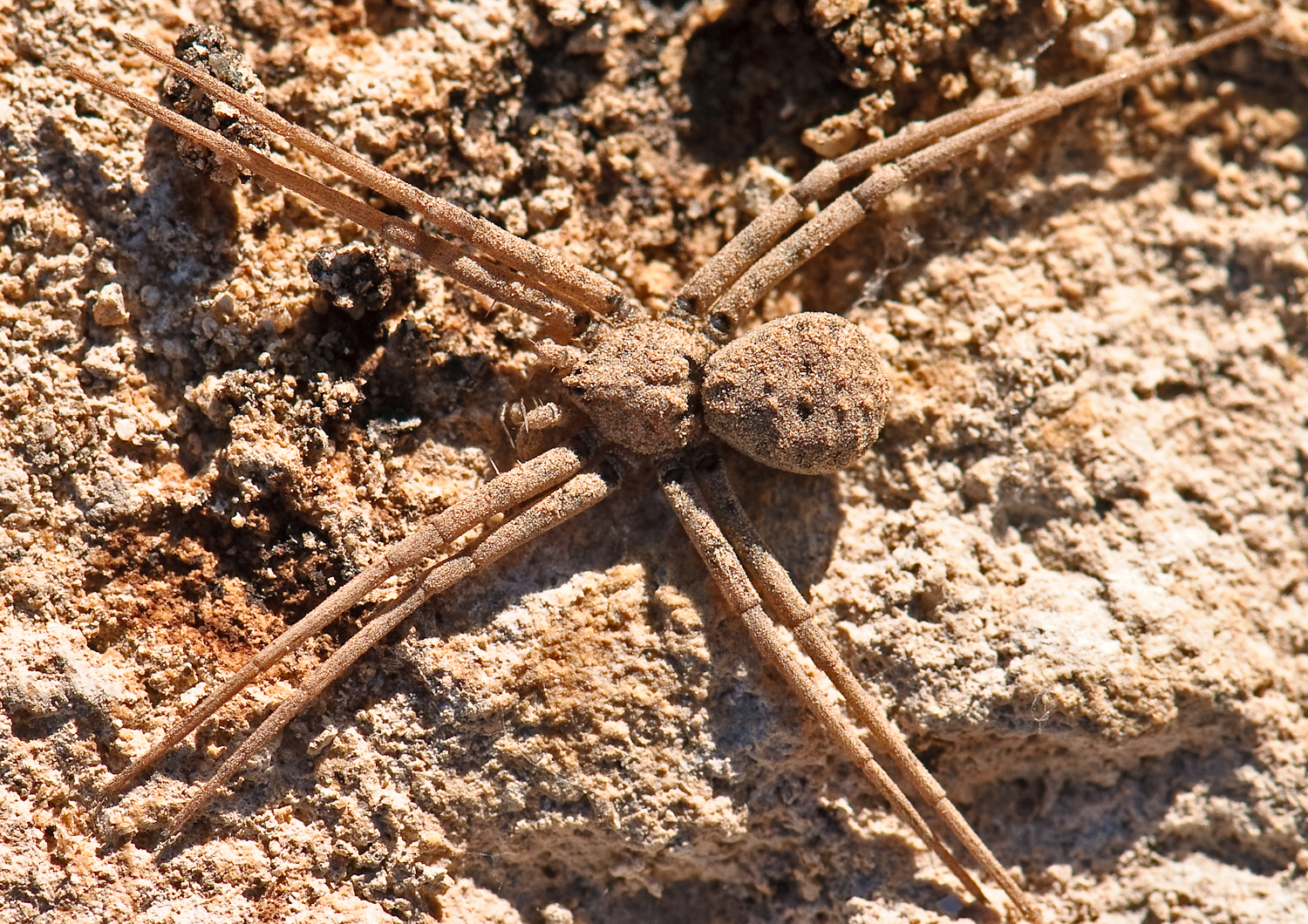
