= Grace Sandhouse =

American entomologist (1896-1940)

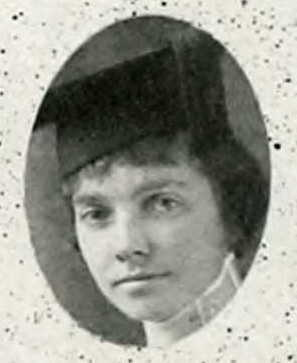
- Born: June 1, 1896; Monticello
- Died: November 9, 1940 (aged 44)
- Alma mater: Cornell University; New York State College of Agriculture and Life Sciences at Cornell University; University of Colorado
- Occupation: Entomologist, scientific collector
- Employer: Bureau of Entomology; United States Department of Agriculture

Grace Adelbert Sandhouse (1896–1940) was an American entomologist.

== Life and career ==
Sandhouse was raised in Monticello, Iowa. She attended the University of Colorado Boulder, where she graduated in 1920, while working for Theodore Cockerell. Cockerell introduced Sandhouse to apiology, the study of bees. She proceeded to earn a master's from the University of Colorado Boulder and a PhD at Cornell University. After graduation she became a Junior Entomologist at the United States Department of Agriculture's Bureau of Entomology, working in the Division of Insect Identification. She worked there until her death, ending her career as an Associate Entomologist.

Research wise, Sandhouse focused on taxonomy of Hymenoptera, specifically Apoidea. She published a monograph on the genus Osmia. Sandhouse's personal archives are in the collection of the Smithsonian Institution Archives.

== Publications ==
- "New North American species of bees belonging to the genus Halictus (Chloralictus)". Proceedings of the United States National Museum. 65 (19): 1–43. September 9, 1924. ISSN 0096-3801.
- The North American bees of the genus Osmia (Hymenoptera: Apoidea). Washington, D.C.: The Entomological society of Washington (1939)
- "A Review of the Nearctic Wasps of the Genus Trypoxylon (Hymenoptera: Sphecidae)". American Midland Naturalist, Volume 24, Number 1 (July, 1940), pages 133–176.
- The Type Species of the Genera and Subgenera of Bees. Washington, D.C.: Smithsonian Institution Press (1943)
- The bees of the genus Agapostemon (Hymenoptera: Apoidea) occurring in the United States. Bureau of Entomology and Plant Quarantine (1936)
