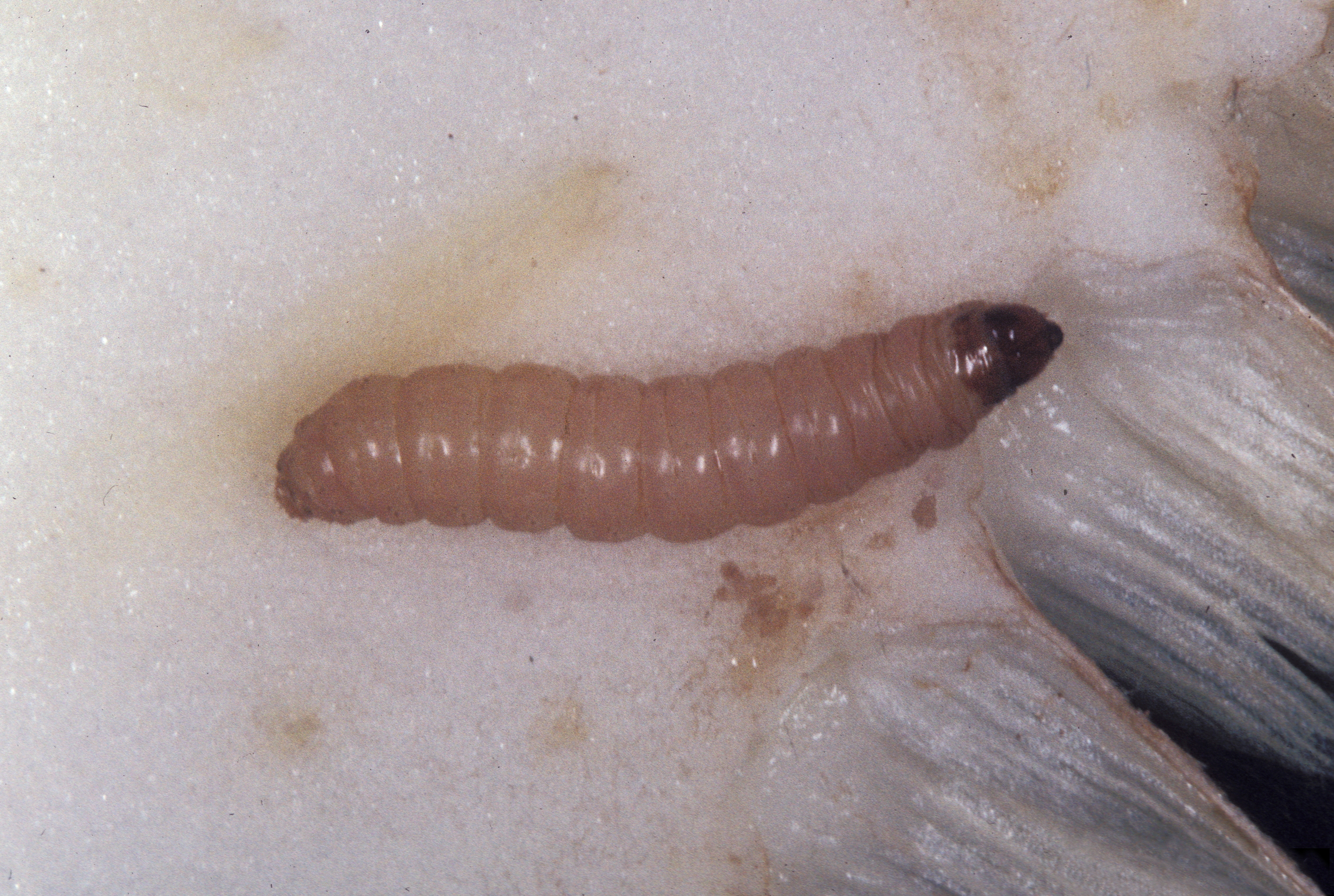
- Suleima helianthana

Scientific classification
- Domain: Eukaryota
- Kingdom: Animalia
- Phylum: Arthropoda
- Class: Insecta
- Order: Lepidoptera
- Family: Tortricidae
- Tribe: Eucosmini
- Genus: Suleima; Heinrich, 1923

= Suleima =

Genus of tortrix moths

Suleima is a genus of moths belonging to the subfamily Olethreutinae of the family Tortricidae.

== Species ==
- Suleima baracana (Kearfott, 1907)
- Suleima cinerodorsana Heinrich, 1923
- Suleima daracana (Kearfott, 1907)
- Suleima helianthana (Riley, 1881)
- Suleima lagopana (Walsingham, 1879)
- Suleima mendaciana Blanchard & Knudson, 1983
- Suleima skinnerana Heinrich, 1923

== See also ==
- List of Tortricidae genera
