= Emily L. Morton =

American entomologist and scientific illustrator

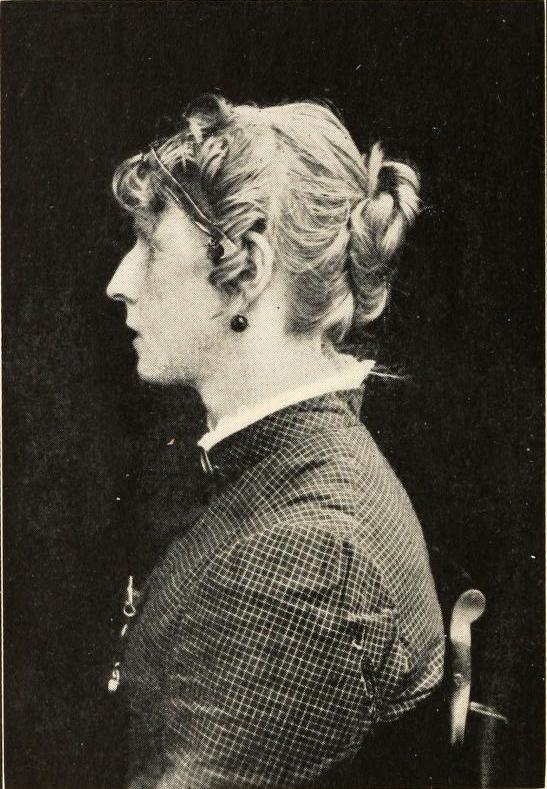
- Born: April 3, 1841; New Windsor, New York, US
- Died: January 8, 1920 (aged 78); New Windsor, New York, US
- Known for: "The Life-Histories of the New York Slug Caterpillars" series
- Scientific career
- Fields: Entomology, scientific illustration

Signature
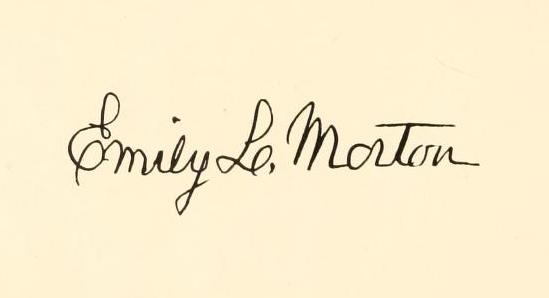

Emily L. Morton (April 3, 1841 – January 8, 1920) was an American entomologist and scientific illustrator. She was a co-author at onset of The Life-Histories of the New York Slug Caterpillars series.

== Life ==
Emily L. Morton was born on April 3, 1814, in New Windsor, New York. At the age of thirteen, she came across a scientific book on insects with their Latin names and became interested in collecting books on insects.

Morton described Lepidoptera life histories in U.S. entomological circles acquiring, rearing, and illustrating the life stages.

She met other collectors through articles and advertisements in the journal The Canadian Entomologist. In 1893, Morton began working with entomologist Harrison G. Dyar after they both placed ads requesting exchanges of moths, including limacodids, in Entomological News.

She also supplied a researcher Alpheus Spring Packard, PhD, with rare specimens of insects injurious to forest and shade trees, such as Janassa lignicolor, Hyparpax aurora and others.

Morton sold eight specimens of her extensive collection of Lepidoptera in which she had hybridized several forms, to an English collector.

She is not known to have published her research results, however Morton became a co-author at onset of "The Life-Histories of the New York Slug Caterpillars" series.Morton was responsible for the accounts of species habits in the series

In 1904, Morton's collection of insects was divided between the American Museum of Natural History, the Boston Society of Natural History, and private collectors.

Emily L. Morton died on January 8, 1920, in New Windsor.
