= Dyar's Law =

Observation in developmental entomology

Dyar's Law (or "Dyar's Rule") is the observed standard that during development of the immature stages of an arthropod, increases in highly sclerotized body parts are predictable and regular by a relatively constant factor. The law is named after Harrison G. Dyar who in 1890 published a paper about his observation that the head capsule widths of lepidopteran larvae follow a geometric progression in growth. However, various authors have noted that an earlier publication in 1886 by W.K. Brooks independently described the same phenomenon in crustaceans, and therefore the variant term Brooks-Dyar Law (or "Brooks Rule" or "Brooks-Dyar Rule") also commonly appears in the literature. The earliest known citation of either author's observations constituting a "Law" dates to a 1925 reference to "Dyar's Law".

Though the progression can be influenced by abiotic and biotic factors such as temperature and food, Dyar's Law can be accurately used to differentiate instars of immature insects and to predict the size of instars missing from samples, crucial data for accurately delineating insect developmental histories.

Initially based on observations of crustaceans and insect larvae, this Law has been applied to immature arthropods in general. Some 80% of entomological studies published from 1980 to 2007 that examined the validity of Dyar's observations supported the Law.
