= Lawrence Bruner =

American entomologist, ornithologist, and ecologist

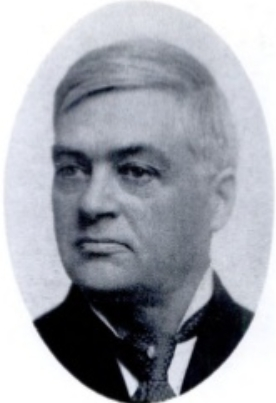
- Born: March 2, 1856; Catasauqua, Pennsylvania, US
- Died: January 30, 1937 (aged 80); Berkeley, California, US
- Known for: Entomology; Ornithology; Taxidermy

Lawrence Bruner (March 2, 1856 – January 30, 1937) was an American entomologist and ornithologist.

== Biography ==
Bruner's parents, Uriah and Amelia Brobst Bruner emigrated to West Point, Nebraska from Pennsylvania in the 1860's when he was a child. While growing up, he collected various insects and small animals, and his parents let him use a small carriage house behind the main home to house his collections. His father Uhriah Bruner became a regent of the University of Nebraska, and at age 15, Lawrence enrolled at the school. He received an appointment as assistant on the United States Entomological Commission in 1880, and as field agent for the United States Department of Agriculture at the University of Nebraska in 1888, where he became instructor in entomology in 1890 and professor in 1895. He also assisted with ornithology at the university, and is credited for his importance in founding the Nebraska Ornithologists' Union. In 1897 and 1898, he traveled in Argentina as field agent again for the United States Department of Agriculture. Lawrence married Marcia A. Dewell on Christmas Day 1881.

Lawrence died in Berkeley, California on January 30, 1937. He is buried in the Wyuka Cemetery in Lincoln, Nebraska.

== Honors ==
He is a member of the Nebraska Hall of Agricultural Achievement.

== Works ==
- The Destructive Locust of Argentina (2 reports, 1898 and 1900)
- Locusts of Paraguay (1906)
- South American Tetrigidae (1912)
- New Elementary Agriculture, co-author (9th ed., 1911)
