= Louise M. Russell =

American entomologist

Louise May Russell
- Born: 6 May 1905; Crown Point, New York, United States
- Died: 15 May 2009 (aged 104); Annapolis, Maryland, United States
- Education: B.S., M.S., Ph.D. Cornell University
- Known for: Scientist, Entomologist
- Scientific career
- Workplaces: US Department of Agriculture

Louise M. Russell (May 6, 1905 – May 15, 2009) was a US Department of Agriculture entomologist renowned for her expertise in insect identification and research on using parasites for biocontrol.

== Life and career ==
Russell was born on May 6, 1905, on the family farm in Crown Point, New York. In 1922, she entered Cornell University, and received her B.S. and M.S. degrees in 1926 and 1927, respectively, and her Ph.D. in 1931.

In 1927 she began working for the US Department of Agriculture as a laboratory assistant, mounting scale insects. In 1929 she was promoted to Junior Entomologist, in 1938 to Assistant Entomologist, in 1944 to Associate Entomologist, in 1946 to Entomologist, in 1953 to Senior Entomologist, and in 1962 to Research Entomologist. She determined thousands of aphid, psyllid, whitefly, and scale insect specimens for use in quarantine programs, pest control, regulatory entomology, and systematics research, and clarified numerous aphid species identification and nomenclatural problems, many involving agricultural pests.

During and after her 48-year career with the USDA she published a total of 106 scientific papers, including descriptions of 84 new species of pit scales, 63 species and four genera of whiteflies, and two species of psyllids.

An active member of the Biological Society of Washington, the Entomological Society of Florida, and the Washington Academy of Sciences, she also spent much time helping others, including serving on graduate student committees as an adjunct professor at North Carolina State University. She was involved in many international events, including ten International Congresses of Entomology, and performed field research in Puerto Rico, El Salvador, India, Pakistan, and Colombia.

Russell formally retired in 1975 at the federal government's mandatory retirement age of 70 with 48 years of government service, but continued to work over the following 25 years without pay as a collaborator with the USDA Systematic Entomology Laboratory. She published her last article at the age of 101. She lived to the age of 104, dying on May 15, 2009, at Annapolis, Maryland.

== Honors and awards ==
In addition to her name appearing as the author of the 153 names she originated, she has been honored by her peers with at least 26 matronyms in three genera and 23 species. She was elected a Fellow of the Entomological Society of America in 1951 and served as Chair of the Editorial Board of the Entomological Society of America's Thomas Say Foundation from 1958–1959, Chair-Elect of ESA Section A, Systematics, Morphology, and Evolution, in 1958, was awarded the ESA Eastern Branch L. O. Howard Award in 1969, and became an ESA Honorary Member in 1985. She was the first woman chosen to serve as President-Elect and then President of the Entomological Society of Washington, in 1965 and 1966, respectively, and was elected Honorary Member in 1985, and Honorary President in 1999.

== Selected publications ==
- Russell, Louise May (1941). A Classification of the Scale Insect Genus Asterolecanium.
- —— (1948). The North American Species of Whiteflies of the Genus Trialeurodes.
- —— (1970). Additions and Corrections to an Annotated List of Generic Names of the Scale Insects (Homoptera: Coccoidea). (This is a supplement to:
  Morrison, Harold; Morrison, Emily Sweetland (Reed) (1966). An annotated list of generic names of the scale insects (Homoptera : Coccoidea). Miscellaneous publication (United States. Dept. Of Agriculture); no. 1015. Washington, DC: Agricultural Research Service, United States Dept. of Agriculture. LCCN agr66000355. .)
- Kosztarab, Michael; —— (1974). An Annotated List of Generic Names of the Scale Insects (Homoptera: Coccoidea): Second Supplement.
