= Proceedings of the Entomological Society of Washington =

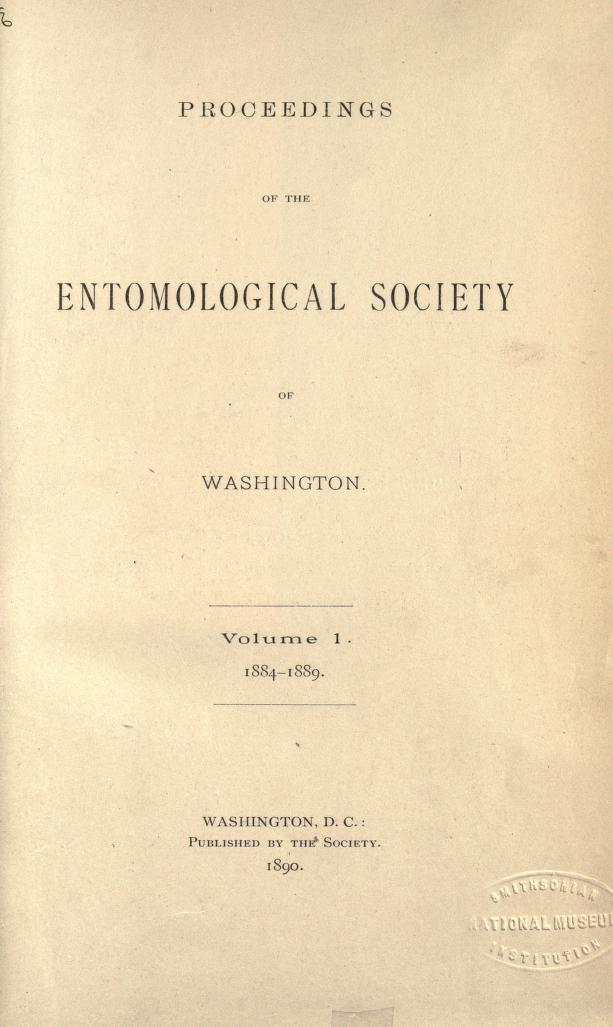
- Cover of the first issue.
- Discipline: Entomology
- Language: English
- Edited by: Mark A. Metz

Publication details
- History: 1886–present
- Publisher: Entomological Society of Washington
- Frequency: Quarterly
- Impact factor: 0.655 (2020)

Standard abbreviations
- ISO 4: Proc. Entomol. Soc. Wash.

Indexing
- ISSN: 0013-8797
- OCLC no.: 630167895

Links
- Journal homepage; Online access (Vol. 1–108, 1886–2007); Online access (Vol. 109–present, 2008–present)

Proceedings of the Entomological Society of Washington is a peer-reviewed scientific journal of entomology published by the Entomological Society of Washington. The journal was established in 1886 and is currently published four times per year. The journal is edited by Mark A. Metz.

== Abstracting and indexing ==
According to Journal Citation Reports, its 2020 impact factor is 0.655, ranking 78th out of 101 in the category 'Entomology'. The journal is indexed in the following databases.

- AGRICOLA
- Biosis
- LOCKSS
- Portico
- Science Citation Index
- Scopus
