= Eugene Amandus Schwarz =

Getman-American entomologist (1844–1928)

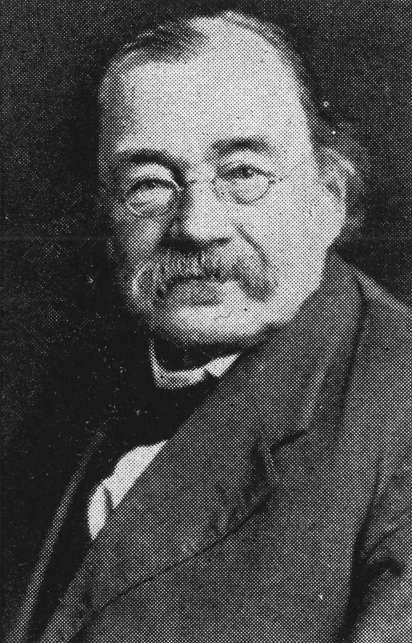
Eugene Amandus Schwarz.

Eugene Amandus Schwarz (April 21, 1844 – October 15, 1928) was a German-American entomologist who specialized in the study of beetles (Coleoptera). He was a popular and influential employee of the U.S. Department of Agriculture for more than fifty years.

== Biography ==
Schwarz was born on April 21, 1844, in Liegnitz, Silesia, part of Prussia at that time. His father, Amandus Schwarz, was a cloth merchant and member of the Common Council of Liegnitz. Schwarz studied zoology and entomology at the universities in Breslau and Leipzig and served briefly in the Prussian medical corp during the Franco-Prussian War.

Fearing to tell his parents that he had decided upon a career in entomology, Schwarz secretly emigrated to the United States in 1872. Based on a recommendation from Gustav Kraatz, a famous German entomologist, he was hired by Hermann August Hagen to work in the Museum of Comparative Zoology at Harvard University. He also attended lectures by Hagen and Louis Agassiz. When Agassiz died in 1873, the museum had financial difficulties and Schwarz chose to quit his position and look elsewhere for work.

While at Harvard, Schwarz had met Henry Guernsey Hubbard who was to become a life-long friend and collaborator. In 1874 they traveled to Detroit and stayed for a time to collect beetles in the region and establish the Detroit Scientific Association. In 1875 they made a collecting expedition through Florida. Upon their return, the American Association for the Advancement of Science was meeting in Detroit and Schwarz had the opportunity to meet many of the leading American entomologists including John Lawrence LeConte and Charles Valentine Riley.

In the summer of 1877 he and Hubbard traveled through the region of Lake Superior and made a very large collection of beetles, the basis of their publication, The Coleoptera of Michigan (1879). Later, Schwarz joined LeConte on a collecting expedition to the American West. In 1878, he obtained a post with the Department of Agriculture, working for the entomological division (which became the USDA Bureau of Entomology in 1894) and associated with the U.S. National Museum, until his death in 1928. He exercised a great influence on many American entomologists. He was a founding member of the Entomological Society of Washington and in 1916 was made an honorary president for life. He was also an active member of the Washington Biologists’ Field Club and the Entomological Society of America. He played a very important role in the organisation of the insect collections of the National Museum of Natural History.

== Works ==
Schwarz published 395 articles during his lifetime, including:

- Coleoptera of Florida (1878) (with LeConte)
- Coleoptera of Michigan (1879) (with Hubbard)
- North American Publications on Entomology (1891)
- Coleoptera of the Harriman Alaska Expedition (1900)
