= Curtis P. Clausen =

American entomologist

Curtis Paul Clausen
- Born: March 28, 1893; Randall, Iowa, U.S.
- Died: February 28, 1976 (aged 82); Oklahoma City, Oklahoma, U.S.
- Education: University of California, Berkeley
- Known for: Biological control, Entomophagous Insects (1940), Clausen's three-generation/-year rule
- Awards: Honorary LL.D. (1966), Fellow of the American Association for the Advancement of Science
- Scientific career
- Fields: Entomology, Biological control
- Workplaces: University of California, Riverside, United States Department of Agriculture

Curtis Paul Clausen (March 28, 1893 – February 28, 1976) was an American entomologist and professor at the University of California, Riverside, who specialized in biological control. He wrote an influential text on the biology of insect predators and parasites, Entomophagous Insects (1940).

== Biography ==
Clausen was born in Randall, Iowa in a family of Danish immigrants, and grew up on the family farm in Oklahoma and from 1910 in Ontario, California. He graduated from the University of Berkeley in 1914 and received an MS in entomology in 1920. He then worked at the citrus experiment station for two years under H.J. Quayle before assisting H.S. Smith at the State Insectary in Sacramento. From 1916 to 1918 he traveled across Asia seeking natural enemies of citrus scale insects. He served in the US Army Coast Artillery for fourteen months and joined the US Department of Agriculture at the Bureau of Entomology in 1920. He then traveled around the world, searching and studying the biology of potential insect control agents. By 1931 he built a catalog of 6000 references on life history studies of insect parasites and predators. In 1940, he wrote the influential book Entomophagous Insects, which was reprinted in 1972. He published numerous papers on the biology of insect predators and parasites. He headed the Division of foreign parasite introductions from 1934 to 1951 and the division of control investigations examining biological control agents. Clausen is known in theoretical biological control for a rule that is sometimes referred to as Clausen's three-generation/-year rule which states that an effective biological control agent shows evidence of control at the point of release within 3 host generations or 3 years and that the lack of evidence could be grounds for declaring an approach as ineffective.

Clausen retired in 1951 from the US department of agriculture and then worked as a professor of biological control at the University of California. He received an honorary LL.D. in 1966 for his work. He was a Fellow of the American Association for the Advancement of Science. He donated his personal library to the University after retirement. He died in Oklahoma City.
