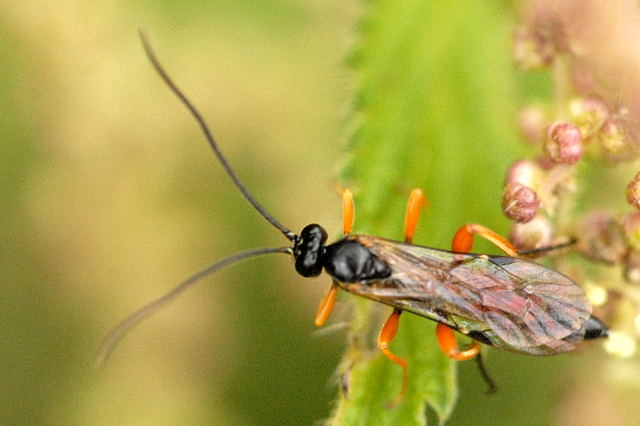
- Monoblastus marginellus

Scientific classification
- Domain: Eukaryota
- Kingdom: Animalia
- Phylum: Arthropoda
- Class: Insecta
- Order: Hymenoptera
- Family: Ichneumonidae
- Genus: Monoblastus; Hartig, 1837

= Monoblastus (insect) =

Genus of insects

Monoblastus is a genus of parasitoid wasps belonging to the family Ichneumonidae.

The species of this genus are found in Europe, Southeastern Asia and North America.

Species:

- Monoblastus apicalis Townes, 1992
- Monoblastus atroferia Townes & Townes, 1950
- Monoblastus bicolor Townes, 1992
- Monoblastus brachyacanthus (Gmelin, 1790)
- Monoblastus caudatus (Hartig, 1837)
- Monoblastus chinensis Kasparyan, 1982
- Monoblastus clauseni (Uchida, 1930)
- Monoblastus davisi(Townes, 1944)
- Monoblastus dionnei (Provancher, 1879)
- Monoblastus discedens (Schmiedeknecht, 1912)
- Monoblastus ermolenkoi Kasparyan, 1987
- Monoblastus erythrurusTownes, Momoi & Townes, 1965
- Monoblastus eurus Townes & Townes, 1950
- Monoblastus favonius Townes & Townes, 1950
- Monoblastus ferius (Davis, 1898)
- Monoblastus forsythia Choi, 2023
- Monoblastus fukiensis Kasparyan, 1982
- Monoblastus fulvescens (Fonscolombe, 1849)
- Monoblastus innumerabilis (Davis, 1897)
- Monoblastus jinjuensis Lee & Cha, 1993
- Monoblastus kaniacensis (Hall, 1919)
- Monoblastus koreensis Kasparyan, Choi, Kang & Lee, 2018
- Monoblastus macer Townes & Townes, 1950
- Monoblastus marginellus (Gravenhorst, 1829)
- Monoblastus montezuma (Cameron, 1886)
- Monoblastus nigrans Kasparyan, 1996
- Monoblastus nigriventus Lee & Cha, 1993
- Monoblastus proximus Townes & Townes, 1950
- Monoblastus rufeabdominus Wang, 1996
- Monoblastus specularis Townes, 1992
- Monoblastus spinosus Brischke, 1871
- Monoblastus tscheki Kasparyan, 1999
