= Otto Lugger =

American entomologist

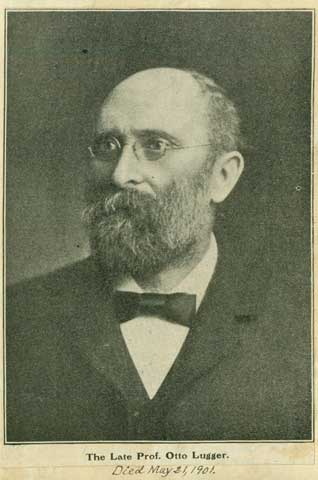

Otto Lugger (16 September 1844 – 21 May 1901) was an American entomologist and botanist who served as the State Entomologist of the U.S. State of Minnesota.

== Biography ==
Lugger was born in Hagen in the Prussian Province of Westphalia where his father was a chemistry professor. After studying at the Gymnasium in Hagen, he joined the Prussian army as a cavalry lieutenant. Along with his parents, the family moved to the United States in 1864, and Lugger found work as an engineer in the army.

While working on surveys around the Great Lakes, he also began to collect insect specimens and came to know C.V. Riley. When Riley became State Entomology of Missouri in 1868, Lugger became an assistant. He helped produce nine annual reports before 1875 when he married Lina Krokmann and moved to Baltimore to become curator of the collections of the Maryland Academy of Sciences. He became an assistant in the entomology division of the United States Department of Agriculture (USDA) in 1885. He was appointed entomologist and botanist at the Minnesota Station in 1888 and later became a state entomologist, a position he held until his death from pneumonia. Some of his work was on the control of chinch bugs using fungi, the spores of which he attempted to propagate, and investigations on locusts including the now extinct Rocky Mountain locust.

Lugger died at his home in Saint Paul, Minnesota on 21 May 1901.
