= Leland Ossian Howard =

American entomologist (1857–1950)

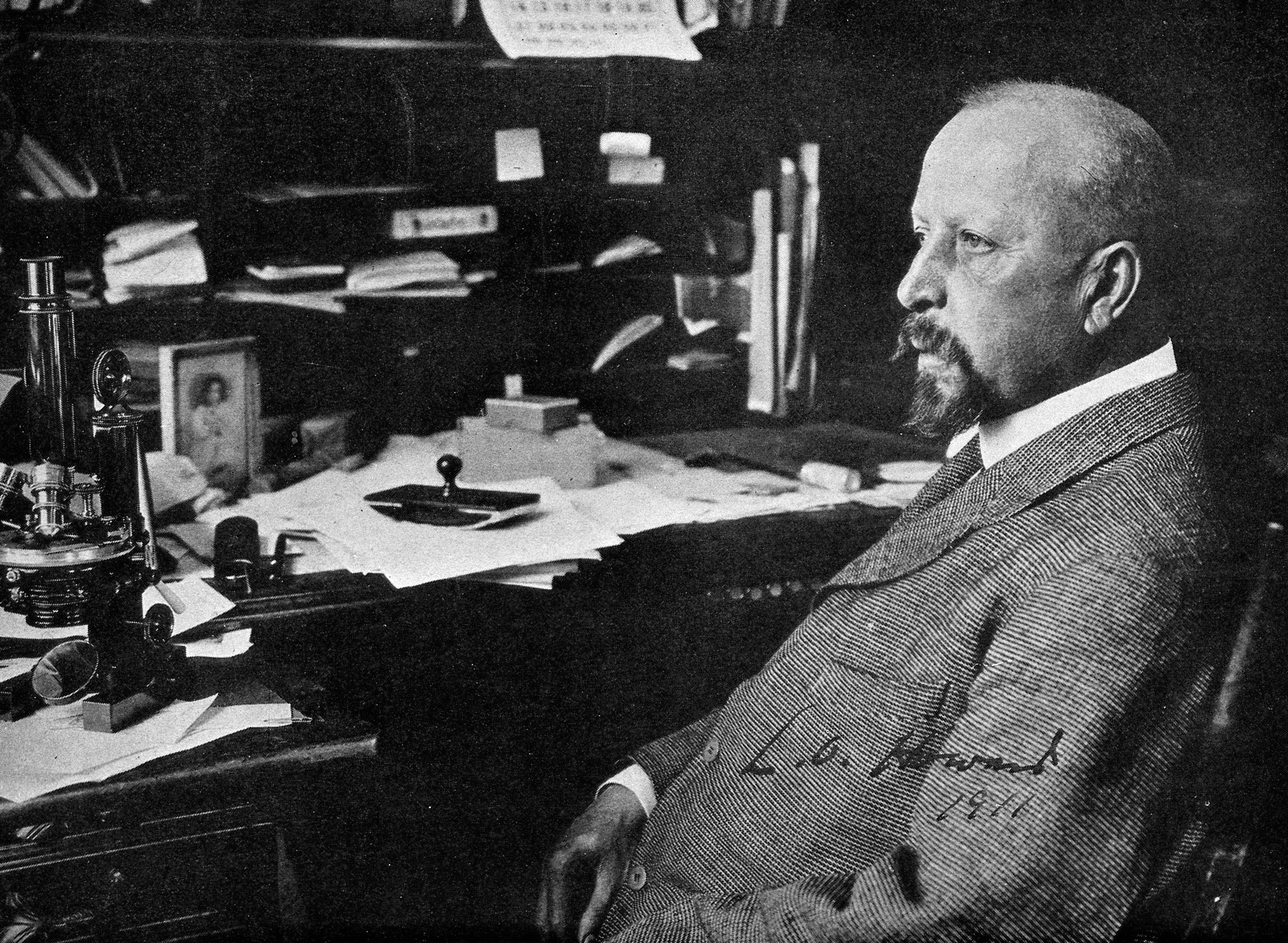
- Leland Ossian Howard, 1911
- Born: June 11, 1857; Rockford, Illinois, USA
- Died: May 1, 1950 (aged 92)
- Education: Cornell University
- Scientific career
- Fields: Entomology
- Workplaces: US Department of Agriculture

Leland Ossian Howard (June 11, 1857 – May 1, 1950) was a pioneer American entomologist who worked in the US Department of Agriculture. Serving as the chief of the bureau of entomology, a successor to C.V. Riley, he helped establish economic entomology as a profession in the United States and strengthened research activities, helping establish laws to prevent the introduction of agricultural pests. He was a specialist on the parasitic wasp family Chalcididae, and contributed to the introduction of biological control agents for pest management. Howard also took an interest in medical entomology.

== Early life ==
Howard was born to Ossian Gregory Howard, a lawyer, and Lucy Denham Thurber on 11 June 1857. His relatives from his mother's side included the Harvard astronomer E.C. Pickering while other distant relatives included Senator J.M. Howard and President William Howard Taft. Shortly after his birth, the family moved from Rockford, to Ithaca, New York where his father worked with a law firm.

An interest in insect collecting was encouraged by his parents with the gift of The Butterfly Hunters by Mary Treat at the age of 10, followed by more books. At the age of 13, along with another collector friend, he recorded the introduction of the European cabbage butterfly (Pieris rapae) in the Catskill region. Howard attended Ithaca Academy. Along with his friends, he founded the Ithaca Natural History Society to meet and discuss papers and insects.

While out collecting one day, Howard met John Henry Comstock, who invited him to his lab at Cornell University. Howard enrolled in Cornell in September 1873, three years after the death of his father, and following the advice of his mother's friends, went to study civil engineering. Doing poorly in differential calculus made him drop engineering and he began to study other subjects including French, German, and Italian. He then joined Comstock's lab as the first research student and graduated in June 1877 with a thesis on respiration in the larva of Corydalis cornutus. Howard worked with Burt Green Wilder and Simon Henry Gage and received a masters at Cornell.

In the 1880s, Howard also attended Columbian College (now George Washington University) for medicine, although he didn't complete a degree. He however received an honorary MD from the same university in 1911 for his contributions to medical entomology.

== Career ==
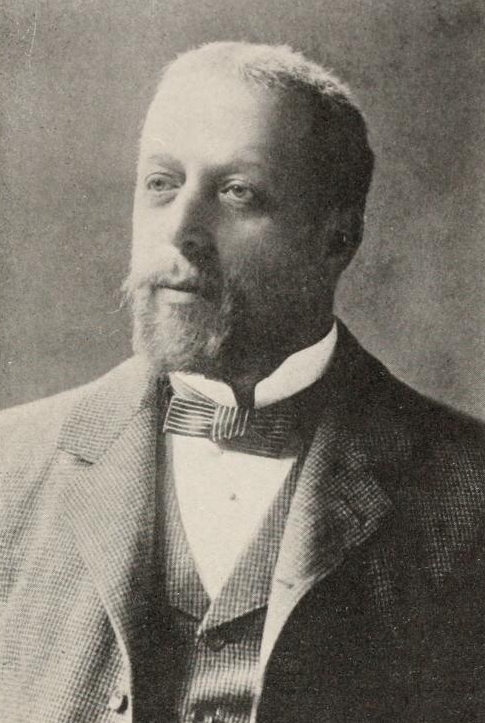
Around 1910

In July 1878, on the recommendation of Professor Comstock, Howard applied for a post in the U.S. Department of Agriculture as an assistant entomologist to C.V. Riley. Despite the low salary ($100/month) and advice against joining it from many friends and family, he took up the job. Among his first tasks was to prepare a manual on sericulture which was published with Riley as the author. Riley was briefly replaced by Professor Comstock in 1880, and again many of his writings went under the authorship of Comstock. This was accepted practice after Riley's return in 1881, until Howard changed it when he rose to authority and ensured that all his co-workers were appropriately credited. When Riley died in a bicycle accident in 1894, Howard became chief of the Bureau of Entomology. He held the position until 1 October 1927. He continued to consult for the Bureau until officially retiring on 30 June 1931. He worked on the systematics of the parasitic Hymenoptera, biological control, and medical entomology of mosquitoes and other flies.

Howard was the editor of Insect Life, a lecturer on entomology at several colleges and universities, and a contributor to reference books on the subject of entomology. He was made permanent secretary of the American Association for the Advancement of Science, honorary curator in the United States National Museum, and consulting entomologist of the Public Health Service. He was elected to the American Philosophical Society in 1911, the American Academy of Arts and Sciences in 1913, and the National Academy of Sciences in 1916. Since 1907, he was a Fellow of the Entomological Society of America.

== Personal life ==
Howard married Marie T. Clifton in 1886, "a girl with a glorious soprano voice", who he met while singing in a choir at college. They had three daughters. Howard was known for his interests in sports.

== Publications ==
- The Principal Household Insects of the United States, Authors L. O. Howard and C. L. Marlatt, with a chapter Insects Affecting Dry Vegetable Foods by F. H. Chittenden, U.S. Department of Agriculture, Division of Entomology, 1896
- Notes on the Mosquitoes of the United States, U.S. Department of Agriculture, Division of Agriculture, 1900
- Mosquitoes, McClure, Phillips & co., 1901
- The Insect Book, Doubleday, Page & Company, 1901
- Preventive and Remedial Work Against Mosquitoes, U.S. Department of Agriculture, Bureau of Entomology, 1910
- The House Fly—Disease Carrier, Frederick A. Stokes company, 1911
- Mosquitoes of North and Central America and the West Indies, Authors Leland Ossian Howard, Harrison Gray Dyar Jr., Frederick Knab, Carnegie Institution of Washington, 1917
- A History of Applied Entomology (Somewhat Anecdotal), Smithsonian Institution, 1930
- The Insect Menace, Century, 1931
- Fighting the insects: the story of an entomologist, MacMillan, 1933 (autobiography)

== Sources ==
- Bishopp, Fred Corry (1957). "Leland Ossian Howard Centennial 1857–1957". Bulletin of the Entomological Society of America. 3 (3): 1–3. doi:10.1093/besa/3.3.1.
- Essig, E. O. (1931). A History of Entomology. MacMillan Company. pp. 658-664.
- Graf, John E.; Graf, Dorothy W. (1959). "Leland Ossian Howard 1857-1950" (PDF). Biographical Memoirs. National Academy of Sciences.
- Howard, Leland Ossian (1933). Fighting the Insects: The Story of an Entomologist, Telling of the Life and Experiences of the Writer. Macmillan Company.
- Mallis, Arnold (1971). American Entomologists. Rutgers University Press. pp. 79–86. ISBN 0-8135-0686-7.
- Russell, Louise M. (1978). "Leland Ossian Howard: A Historical Review". Annual Review of Entomology. 23: 1–15. doi:10.1146/annurev.en.23.010178.000245.
- Sterling, Keir B., ed. (1997). "Howard, Leland Ossian". Biographical Dictionary of American and Canadian Naturalists and Environmentalists. Greenwood Press.
