= Frederick Knab =

American entomologist (1865–1918)

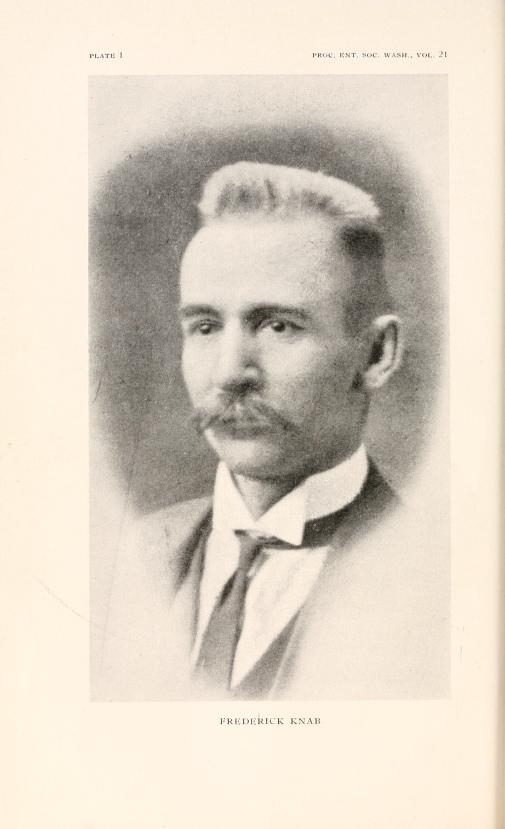
- a portrait of Knab from his obituary
- Born: September 22, 1865; Würzburg, Kingdom of Bavaria
- Died: November 2, 1918 (aged 53); Washington, D.C., U.S.
- Citizenship: United States
- Education: Academy of Fine Arts, Munich, PhD Candidate George Washington University
- Years active: 1885–1918
- Employer: United States National Museum
- Known for: Artist, entomologist

Frederick Knab (September 22, 1865 – November 2, 1918) was an artist and entomologist active from the 1880s through the 1918, most noted for his oil paintings and illustrations and his work with coleopterous and dipterous insects.

Knab was born September 22, 1865, in Würzburg, Kingdom of Bavaria and came to the United States as a boy of eight, about two to three years after the formation of the German Empire. He emigranted with his parents, Oscar and Josephine Knab, who settled in Chicopee, Massachusetts in 1873. His father was an engraver and painter and an uncle was court painter to the King of Bavaria. In his youth, Knab showed artistic talent and a strong interest in the natural sciences, especially entomology. He studied the classic works of Charles Darwin, Alfred Russel Wallace, and Henry Walter Bates and accumulated a large collection of insects, particularly beetles (Order Coleoptera), and became an active member of the Springfield (Massachusetts) Zoological Club and an active correspondent with other coleopterists.

In 1885, Knab undertook a sixteen month collecting trip up the Amazon River, traveling from its mouth to Peru. He kept a journal of his expedition, which formed an important source of experience for his later scientific career. In 1889, he went to Europe and studied art for two years at the Munich Academy, and then established a studio in Chicopee with the intention of making landscape painting his profession.

In 1903 the Carnegie Institution of Washington provided a grant to United States Department of Agriculture entomologist Leland Ossian Howard to develop a monograph of the mosquitoes of North and Central America and the West Indies. In organizing the work Howard sought the advice of entomologist George Dimmock of Springfield as to the best observer known to him who could undertake the study of the biology of the mosquitoes of the New England region, and Dimmock nominated Knab. Knab's work produced important notes and a report illustrated by drawings which were so excellent that State Entomologist of Illinois Stephen Alfred Forbes subsequently hired Knab as a scientific illustrator, giving his abilities wider exposure.

In 1906 Knab accepted a position with the Bureau of Entomology of the United States Department of Agriculture in Washington, D.C., and became co-author of the Carnegie Institution-sponsored monograph on mosquitoes in collaboration with Leland Ossian Howard and Harrison Gray Dyar, Jr. He became an active member of the Biological Society of Washington, served as Vice-President of the Entomological Society of Washington, and was a fellow of the American Association for the Advancement of Science and the Entomological Society of America. He began working on a Doctor of Philosophy degree at George Washington University, but the final stages of his illness prevented him from completing the requirements before his death.

Knab died in Washington, D.C. on November 2, 1918, after a long and painful battle with leishmaniasis contracted during his expedition to Brazil in 1885–1886, which he himself diagnosed through study of the South American medical literature. A bibliography of his published works was provided as an addendum to a memorial authored by three of his closest colleagues, Andrew Nelson Caudell, August Busck, and Leland Ossian Howard published in 1919.
