= Albert Franklin Burgess =

American entomologist

Albert Franklin Burgess (October 2, 1873 – February 23, 1953) was an American entomologist. He was a pioneer of approaches to the control of the gypsy moth. He used biological control measures and also tried to restrict the expansion of the moth by intensive management along a 9000 square mile barrier belt surrounding the area affected by the moths in New Jersey.

Burgess was born in Rockland, Massachusetts, where he went to local schools before graduating from the Massachusetts Agricultural College in 1895. After a master's degree in 1897 he went to work as an assistant entomologist in the Massachusetts State Board of Agriculture. He became an assistant in entomology at the University of Illinois Chicago in 1899. From 1907 he served in the US Bureau of Entomology working on the gypsy moth. From 1916 he also studied the browntail moth.

He married Mary E. Dwight in 1904 and after her death in 1944 he married again.
