= United States Entomological Commission =

- Formation: 1877
- Purpose: Entomology
- Parent organization: United States Department of the Interior

The United States Entomological Commission was established by an Act of Congress in 1877 as a department under the United States Geological and Geographical Survey of the Territories headed by Ferdinand Vandeveer Hayden. The commission was created to find a solution for the Rocky Mountain locust that plagued much of the American West at that time. The original commission was allotted an $18,000 budget with a staff that included three skilled entomologists who were to be appointed by the Secretary of the Interior. The Entomological Commission's first annual report to Congress was published in 1878; their last was printed in 1902.

The commission largely came about through the urging of two entomologists, Charles Valentine Riley and Cyrus Thomas both of whom, along with Alpheus Spring Packard, became the first entomologists to serve on the commission; Dr. Riley as chief, Dr. Packard as secretary and Dr. Thomas as disbursing agent.

The United States Entomological Commission went on to assist American farmers and ranchers on a number of different threats until the dawn of the twentieth century. Its legacy, at least in part, can be gleaned from the numerous bulletins and near quarter century's worth of annual reports that today can be viewed online.
