= Albert Koebele =

American entomologist

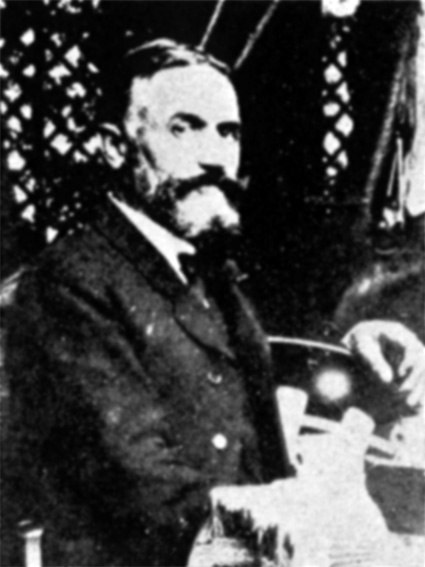
Albert Koebele

Albert Koebele (28 February 1853 - 28 December 1924) was an economic entomologist and a pioneer in the use of biological controls to manage insect pests.

== Early career ==
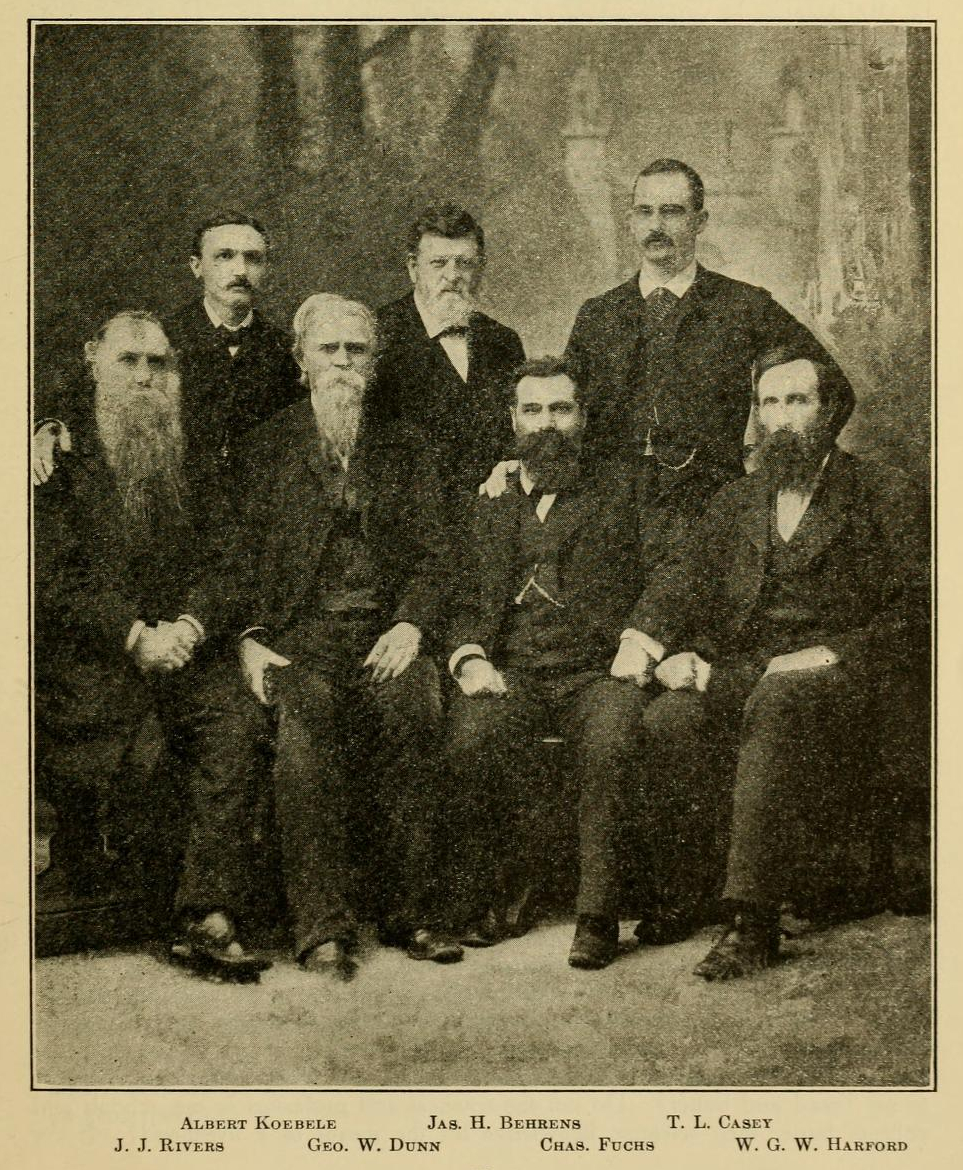
Koebele and other entomologists c. 1913

Koebele was born in Waldkirch, Germany, in 1853. There are no details about his early life but in 1873 he immigrated to the United States, settled in New York, and became a naturalized citizen in 1880. By this time he was a member of the Brooklyn Entomological Society and had demonstrated great skill at preserving and mounting insects. Charles Valentine Riley, the noted federal entomologist, was impressed by these skills and offered Koebele a job at the U.S. Department of Agriculture. Koebele promptly accepted the offer and moved to Washington, D.C. in 1881.

Riley sent his new employee to the South in 1882 to study the cotton worm, the larva of a moth (Alabama argillacea) that originated in South America but had become a serious pest for cotton growers in the United States. The following year Koebele traveled to Brazil where he studied cotton pests and collected a large number of insect specimens.

== California citrus ==
At his request, Koebele was transferred in 1885 to Alameda, California where he studied local insect pests and evaluated the effectiveness of various insecticides. At this time the California citrus industry was facing an economic crisis brought about by the cottony cushion scale (Icerya purchasi), an invasive insect that had established itself in California orchards several years earlier. Koebele was soon focused on this pest, working alongside another federal entomologist, Daniel William Coquillett, to find a remedy. Insecticides had little effect and growers resorted to pulling up infested trees and burning them.

Back in Washington, Riley had noted the curious fact that citrus trees in Australia were largely unaffected by the cottony cushion scale even though the insect was native to the region. He suspected that natural predators of the scale insects held them in check. In 1888 Riley sent Koebele to Australia to investigate. There he found two likely predators of the scale—a parasitic fly (Cryptochaetum iceryae) and the vedalia beetle (Rodolia cardinalis). Koebele captured hundreds of these insects and shipped them back to Coquillett in California for further evaluation.

Coquillett placed the vedalia beetles on an infested orange tree enclosed in a tent. In a few months, the beetles had multiplied prolifically and devoured the scale insects. When the tent was opened, the beetles spread to adjoining trees and soon the entire orchard was free of the cottony cushion scale. As word of the dramatic results spread, citrus growers from throughout the state came to gather the insects and release them into their orchards. The beetles spread rapidly and by 1890 California was almost entirely free of the pest.

The introduction of vedalia beetles to combat cottony cushion scale is generally recognized as the first instance of successful biological control. Koebele in particular was hailed as a hero and the growers association awarded him with a gold watch and diamond earrings for his wife. Riley felt that his own role in the success was overlooked and he complained publicly of the perceived slight. Nevertheless, the growers pressured Riley to send Koebele on another expedition in 1891 to collect additional predatory insects from New Zealand, Australia and other Pacific islands. The friction between Riley and the Californians continued and he eventually ordered Coquillet and Koeble back to Washington. Instead, Koebele elected to resign his post and go to work for the Hawaiian provisional government.

== Hawaiian sugarcane ==
For the next several years Koebele worked in Hawaii, first for the provisional government and then for the Hawaiian Sugar Planters' Association. Focusing on the biological control of insects that were harmful to the sugarcane industry, he traveled extensively looking for useful insects in Australia, Ceylon, China, Japan, Fiji, and Mexico. As a result of these trips he introduced numerous insects into Hawaii and had varying degrees of success in controlling sugarcane pests.

In addition to pioneering the use biological control on insect pests, Koebele is credited with the first attempt to apply biological control to an invasive plant species, Lantana camara. Koebele collected and released several insects from Mexico that used lantana as a host. The results were encouraging but he did not completely succeed in eradicating the weed in Hawaii.

In 1908 Koebele returned to Germany in hopes of recovering from ill health and failing eyesight. For a time he continued to work for the planters' association, but poor health and then the outbreak of World War One forced him to remain in Germany. After the war his health continued to decline until he died on 28 December 1924.
