= George Marx =

German-born American zoologist (1838–1895)

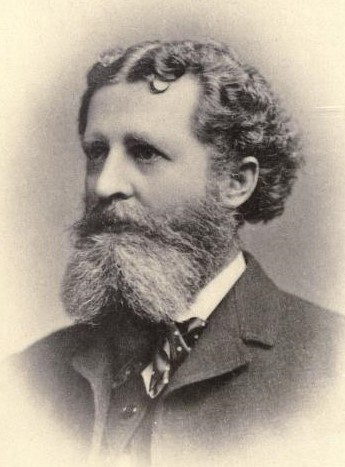
- Born: June 22, 1838; Laubach, Grand Duchy of Hesse
- Died: January 3, 1895 (aged 56); Washington, D.C., United States
- Citizenship: Naturalized American citizen
- Scientific career
- Fields: Arachnology, Acarology, Entomology

George Marx (June 22, 1838 – January 3, 1895) was a German-born American arachnologist, scientific illustrator and physician. He was regarded as one of the foremost authorities on spiders and highly regarded for his superb scientific illustrations.

== Life and career ==
Marx was born on June 22, 1838, at Laubach in the Grand Duchy of Hesse, where his father was a court chaplain. At age fourteen he entered a gymnasium (high school) in Darmstadt with the expectation that he would follow his father into the ministry. While at school Marx became interested in botany and displayed such an aptitude as an artist that he was employed to illustrate a book on the local flora. Against his father's wishes, he decided to study pharmacy because it would provide him an opportunity to pursue his interest in botany.

After completing his pharmaceutical studies at Giessen Marx traveled to the United States in 1860. At the outbreak of the Civil War he enlisted in the Union Army and served as a private until the First Battle of Bull Run in July 1861. Afterwards, his expertise in pharmacy and medicine resulted in a transfer to the medical corps where he served as an assistant surgeon. In July 1862 Marx was honorably discharged because of illness and a severe wound.

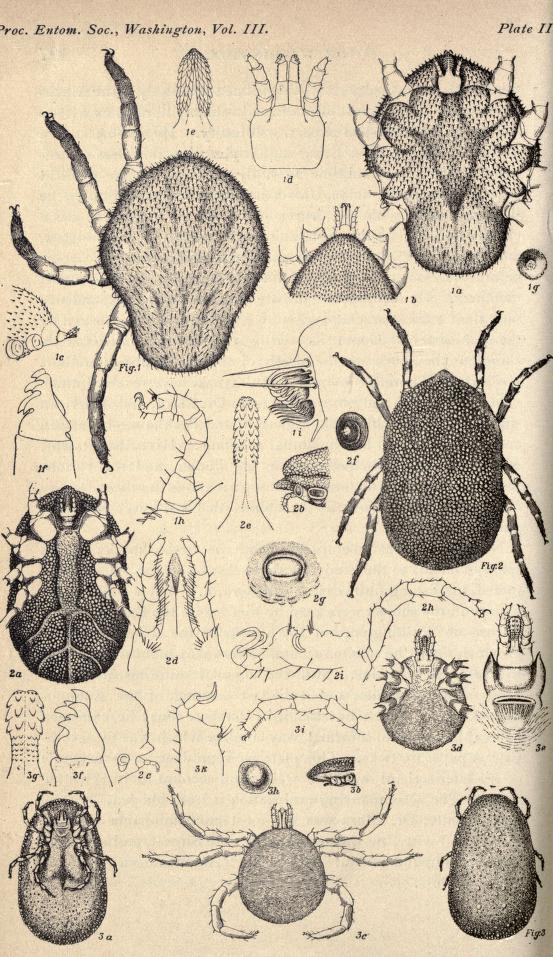
Illustration of ticks (Ixodida) by Marx

After receiving his discharge, Marx settled in New York City and worked as a pharmacist for the duration of the war. In 1865 he moved to Philadelphia, started a business, and married Minnie Maurer. While in Philadelphia he became interested in collecting and studying spiders. In 1878, he took a position in Washington D.C. working as a natural history illustrator for the U.S. Department of Agriculture in the Division of Entomology. He earned a reputation as a skilled artist and many of the Division's publications were illustrated with his works. In 1889 he was appointed chief of the USDA's newly established Division of Illustrations. His colleagues said the "plates and figures which adorn his contributions to science are by far the best illustrations of Arachnids that have ever been produced in America".

In addition to his work on illustrations, Marx continued to collect and study spiders. He published his first paper, "On Some New Tube-Constructing Spiders" in 1881 and went on to write some thirty additional papers on arachnids, many of them illustrated with his own drawings. He was recognized as an authority on spiders and collaborated with noted arachnologists in America and Europe including Tamerlan Thorell, Eugène Simon, James Henry Emerton and George Williams Peckham. Marx completed and edited Die Spinnen Amerikas (The American Spiders) which had been left unfinished by the death of the original author, Eugen von Keyserling. Marx was a founder and active member of the Entomological Society of Washington and served as president of the organization in 1891. In addition to all his other activities he also found time to continue his medical studies and in 1885 received an M.D. from Columbian University (now George Washington University).

Marx died on January 3, 1895, in Washington, D.C. He left a collection of over 1000 spiders to the United States National Museum. The remainder of his collection and his extensive library was put on sale for $1500.

== Publications ==
A few of his titles follow. A more comprehensive bibliography can be found in his Obituary and Bibliography, 1895.

- On the Morphology of Scorpionidae, 1888
- Catalogue of the Described Araneae of Temperate North America, 1889-1890
- On the Morphology of Ticks, 1892
