= Charles Valentine Riley =

British-born American entomologist and artist (1843-1895)

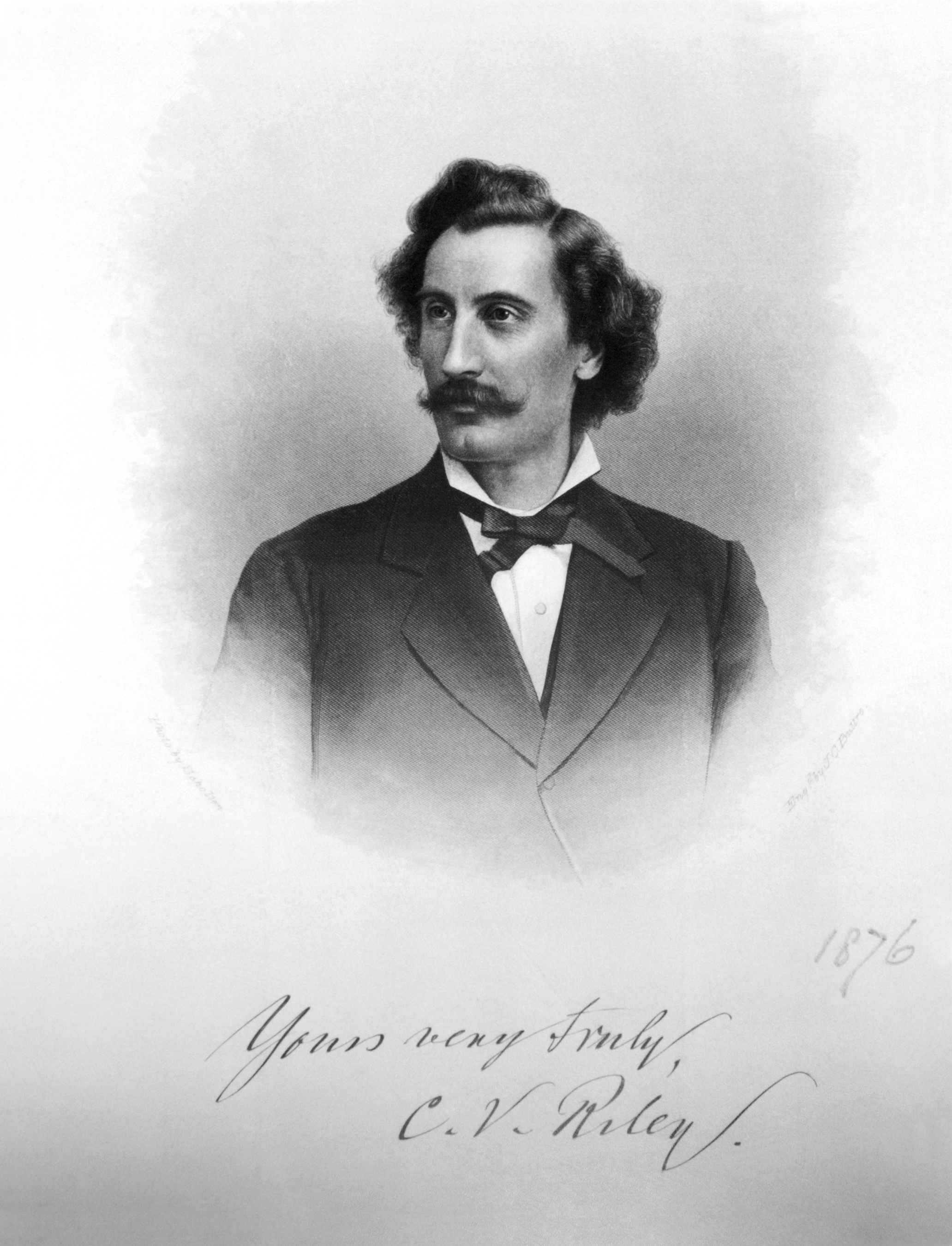
- Born: 18 September 1843; London, England, United Kingdom
- Died: September 14, 1895 (aged 51); Washington D. C., United States
- Citizenship: Naturalized American citizen
- Scientific career
- Fields: Entomology

Charles Valentine Riley (18 September 1843 – 14 September 1895) was a British-born American entomologist and artist. He was one of the first individuals to use biological pest control and authored over 2,400 publications. He convinced Congress to create the United States Entomological Commission and was among the founders of the American Association of Economic Entomologists.

== Early life ==
The son of a Church of England minister, Charles Valentine Riley was born on 19 September 1843 in London's Chelsea district. When he was around eleven his parents, the Rev. Charles and Mary (née Valentine) Riley, chose to further his education in Europe. There he excelled at art and natural history attending private schools in Dieppe, France and later Bonn, Germany. After the death of his father he was brought home to Britain to enroll in a public school there. Sometime later his mother remarried which may have played a part in his decision, taken at the age of seventeen, to cross the Atlantic Ocean to America with scant resources.

Riley's journey west ended in the U.S. state of Illinois where he was employed as a laborer on a farm in Aroma, a small community in Kankakee County some fifty miles south of Chicago. Riley had become acquainted with the farm's owner, a British expatriate named George Edwards, sometime earlier when the latter was visiting London. Around 1864 he left the Edwards’ farm to work for the Chicago-based Prairie Farmer, a leading agricultural journal as reporter, artist, and editor of the entomological department. A few months later he joined the 134th Illinois Volunteer Infantry Regiment, mustering out before the end of 1864 after fulfilling his one-hundred day enlistment commitment.

== Career ==
In 1868, he was appointed as the first State Entomologist for the State of Missouri. He collaborated on the annual reports from Missouri, work which established him as one of the leading entomologists in the United States.

Riley studied the plague of grasshoppers that invaded many Western States between 1873 and 1877. He convinced the United States Congress to establish the United States Entomological Commission, which included a Grasshopper Commission, to which Riley was appointed chairman.

In 1876, he was elected as a member to the American Philosophical Society.

In 1878, he was appointed to the post of entomologist to the U.S. Department of Agriculture, but he resigned after only a year because of a disagreement with the Commissioner. He was reappointed in 1881 and remained in the top post until 1894. He was also appointed the first curator of insects for the Smithsonian Institution in 1885. Riley would later go on to donate his 100,000 piece insect specimen collection to them.

Drawing by Charles Valentine Riley

He was one of the first to practice biological pest control, introducing a beetle that was the natural enemy to a scale that was damaging the California citrus industry. Because this method successfully reduced the scale, Riley is sometimes known as the "Father of Biological Control". He invented the “cyclone” or eddy chamber in nozzles for spraying purposes.

He was among the first to notice that the American grapes, Vitis labrusca were resistant to grape Phylloxera. His work with J. E. Planchon led to the use of grafting French grape on V. labrusca root stock. This effort helped save the French wine industry and for his efforts, Riley received the French Grand Gold Medal and was named a Chevalier (Knight) of the Legion of Honor in 1884.

A prolific writer, artist, and visionary, Riley authored over 2,400 publications. He published two journals, The American Entomologist (1868–80) and Insect Life (1889–94) and Riley was the first to recommend for the establishment of the Office of Experiment Stations, in 1878 before the National Agricultural Congress. He received honorary degrees from Kansas State University and the University of Missouri. He was an honorary member of the Entomological Society of London and founder and first president of the Entomological Society of Washington. He and Dr. L. O. Howard, Riley's assistant in the Federal Entomological Service, were among the founders of the American Association of Economic Entomologists, which became part of Entomological Society of America in 1953. Riley was succeeded as State Entomologist of Missouri by Otto Lugger who served as an assistant in Riley's early years.

== Marriage ==
On 20 June 1878 Riley married in St. Louis, Missouri, Emilie Conzelman, who was born and raised in that city. Her father, Gottlieb Conzelman, came from Germany and supported his family employed as a wallpaper hanger. Emilie's mother, Jorgine Augusta (née Grønbech), was Danish; she died 21 February 1861 in St. Louis, Missouri at age 39. Charles and Emilie went on to have five girls and two boys. Their first, Alice was born in 1879 and Cathryn, their youngest, came in 1891. William, Mary, Harold (who died at four months), Helen and Thora were all born in the 1880s. Emilie Conzelman Riley died at Washington D. C. on 10 December 1947, nearly a month shy of her 98th birthday (29 January 1948).

== Death ==
On 14 September 1895 Riley died as the result of a bicycle accident that occurred not far from his Washington, D.C., residence. As he was riding rapidly down a hill, the bicycle wheel struck a granite paving block dropped by a wagon. He catapulted to the pavement and fractured his skull. He was carried home on a wagon and never regained consciousness. He died at his home the same day just short of the age of 52, leaving his widow with six children.
