= Susanna Phelps Gage =

American embryologist (1857–1915)

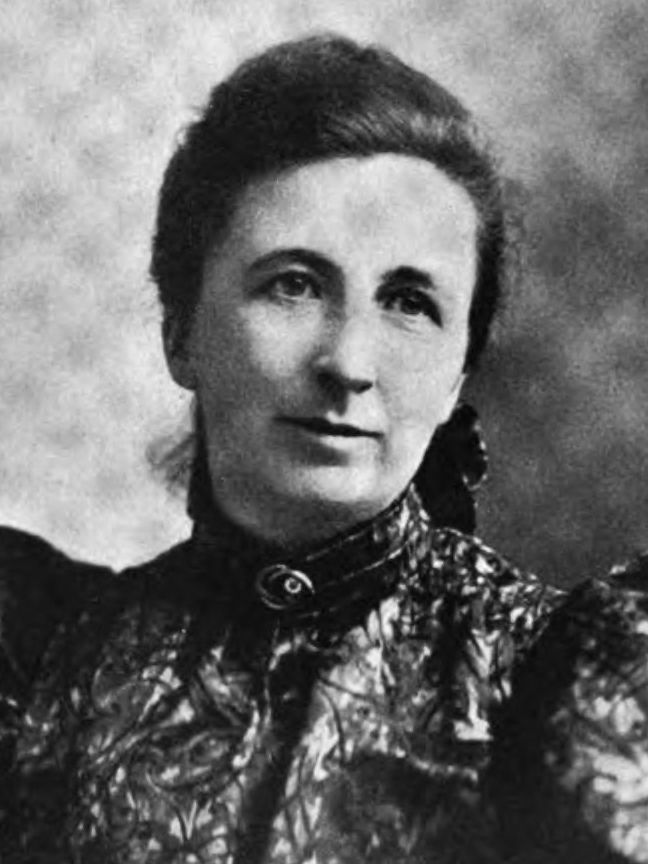
- Born: Susanna Phelps; December 26, 1857; Morrisville, New York
- Died: October 15, 1915 (aged 57)
- Education: Cornell University
- Occupation: Embryologist
- Spouse: Simon Henry Gage

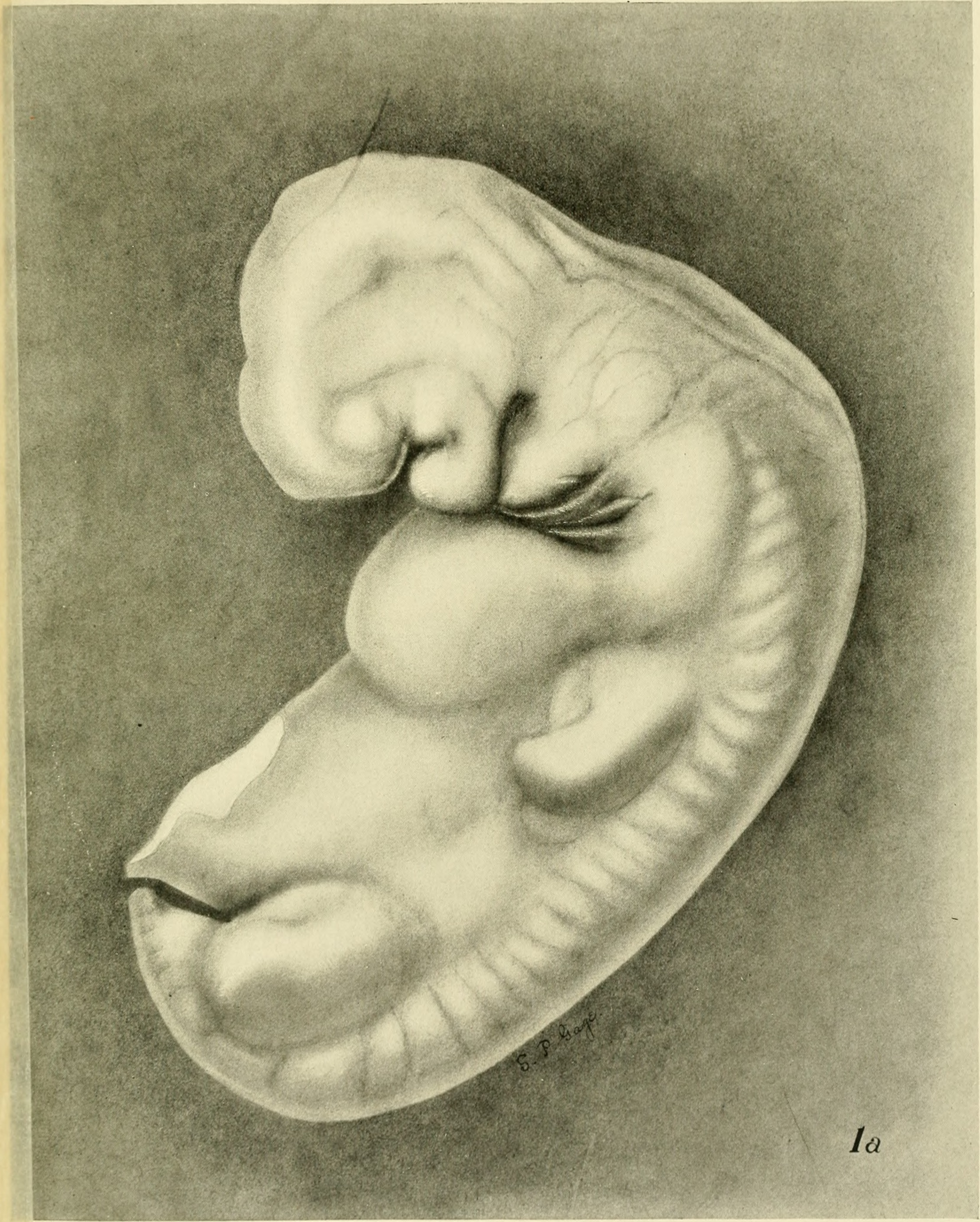
Illustration from one of Gage's research papers on human embryo anatomy, 1905

Susanna Phelps Gage (1857–1915) was an American embryologist and comparative anatomist. She initially worked on the anatomy of small animals and humans, later shifting into neurology to study the embryological development of the brain and the anatomy of the human nervous system. She also developed a new and widely adopted method for making anatomical teaching models out of paper rather than wax. Although Susanna Phelps Gage was a respected embryologist and comparative anatomist, her work was often ignored. Like most other women scientists of the late 19th and early 20th centuries who were married to scientists, Gage's research was often viewed as a mere adjunct to her husband's projects.

== Early life and education ==
Susanna Stuart Phelps was born December 26, 1857, in Morrisville, New York. Her father, Henry Samuel Phelps, was a businessman, and her mother, Mary Austin Phelps, had been a schoolteacher prior to marriage. In 1903, after her parents' death, Phelps gave the family home to the town of Morrisville to become the Morrisville Public Library; since 2005 it has been on the National Register of Historic Places.

Phelps was educated at Cazenovia Seminary and in 1875 went on to Cornell University, initially for her undergraduate degree. She studied broadly, in Latin, English literature, history, and the sciences, becoming the first woman in the university's history to take a laboratory physics class. While still an undergraduate, she became fascinated with zoology and especially anatomy, taking every class offered in these subjects. She went on to earn her Ph.D. at Cornell in 1880.

In 1881, Phelps married Simon Henry Gage (1851–1944), who was already an assistant professor of histology and embryology at Cornell, where he would spend his entire academic career. They had a son, Henry Phelps Gage, who became a physicist and inventor.

== Research in anatomy and embryology ==
After gaining her Ph.D., Gage pursued independent research in comparative anatomy and embryology. Like many women scientists in the late 19th century, Gage never held a formal job congruent with her abilities and spent some of her time supporting her husband's career—for example as an editor of at least one edition of his book The Microscope and as an illustrator for some of his papers. Although Gage's work was often overshadowed by that of her husband—the first edition of American Men and Women of Science lists her as "Mrs. S.H. Gage"—she became a respected scientist in her field, publishing in such prestigious journals as Science, American Journal of Anatomy, The Anatomical Record, and The American Naturalist, among others. In the second edition of American Men and Women of Science, she was one of only 25 women to be featured as highly significant in her field. She was elected a fellow of the American Academy for the Advancement of Science and was a member of the American Anatomical Association, the American Society of Zoologists, the American Microscopical Society, and the German Anatomical Society.

Gage initially published on the anatomy of small animals such as turtles and birds as well as (later on) the anatomy of humans, sometimes co-authoring papers with her husband. When she began her career, the fibrous aspects of striated muscles in small animals were not well understood, and Gage's research in this area came to be considered fundamental.

In 1904, Gage joined a research team at the Bermuda Biological Station for Research in St. George, Bermuda.

== Research in neurology ==
Gage had become interested in neurology as a student while taking courses with the Cornell zoologist Burt Green Wilder. In 1905, she decided to study neurology formally, first attending Johns Hopkins Medical School in Baltimore, Maryland, and then moving to Harvard University. These studies influenced the course of her research into the comparative morphology of the brain and its embryological development, as well as into the anatomy of the human nervous system as a whole. Ten of her 26 solo-authored papers were on aspects of neurology and are considered her most important work.

== Anatomical models ==
Gage was a skilled artist and illustrated both her own scientific papers and some of those by her husband. Gage was also the first person to demonstrate the feasibility and utility of making anatomical teaching models out of stacks of blotting paper rather than the more usual wax, arguing for such models on the basis of "the ease and cleanliness of their production" compared to the "drudgery" of making wax models, and for "the lightness and durability of the product." Other embryologists copied her method, and several—including Ivan Wallin—refined it further until the need for these kinds of models was superseded by other approaches in the 1930s.

== National university ==
Gage believed in George Washington's idea that America should have a national university, and in the mid 1890s she helped to found the George Washington Memorial Association as a means to try to bring this about. In 1904, the association was instrumental in one stage of the expansion of Columbian University in Washington, D.C., and its name change to George Washington University.

Gage suffered from failing health for the last four years of her life and died suddenly October 15, 1915, only 57 years old. Her husband survived her by almost three decades.

== Legacy ==
Following Gage's death, her husband and son set up a memorial fund in her name that was used to build a room in the new women's dormitory at Cornell, Clara Dickson Hall. In 1918—to honor her spirit in leading the way for women in science at Cornell University—they created the Susanna Phelps Gage Fund for Research in Physics at Cornell. Some of her papers and letters can be found in the Cornell University collection of her son's papers.

A set of histological slides of sections of mouse brain prepared by Phelps in 1894 is held by Yale University.

== Selected publications ==
- "Aquatic respiration in soft-shelled turtles: a contribution to the physiology of respiration in vertebrates" (1886; with Simon H. Gage)
- "The Intramuscular Endings of Fibers in the Skeletal Muscles of Domestic and Laboratory Animals" (1890)
- "The brain of Diemyctilus viridescens from larval to adult life and comparison with the brain of Amia and Petromyzon" (1893)
- "Comparative morphology of the brain of the soft-shelled turtle (Amyda mutica) and the english sparrow (Passer domestica)" (1896; with Simon H. Gage)
- "A three weeks' human embryo, with especial reference to the brain and the nephric system" (1905)
- "The Method of Making Models from Sheets of Blotting Paper" (1905)
- "The notochord of the head in human embryos of the third to the twelfth week and comparisons with other vertebrates" (1906)
- "Sudan III. Deposited in the egg and transmitted to the chick" (1908)
