= I. W. Taber =

American photographer (1830–1912)

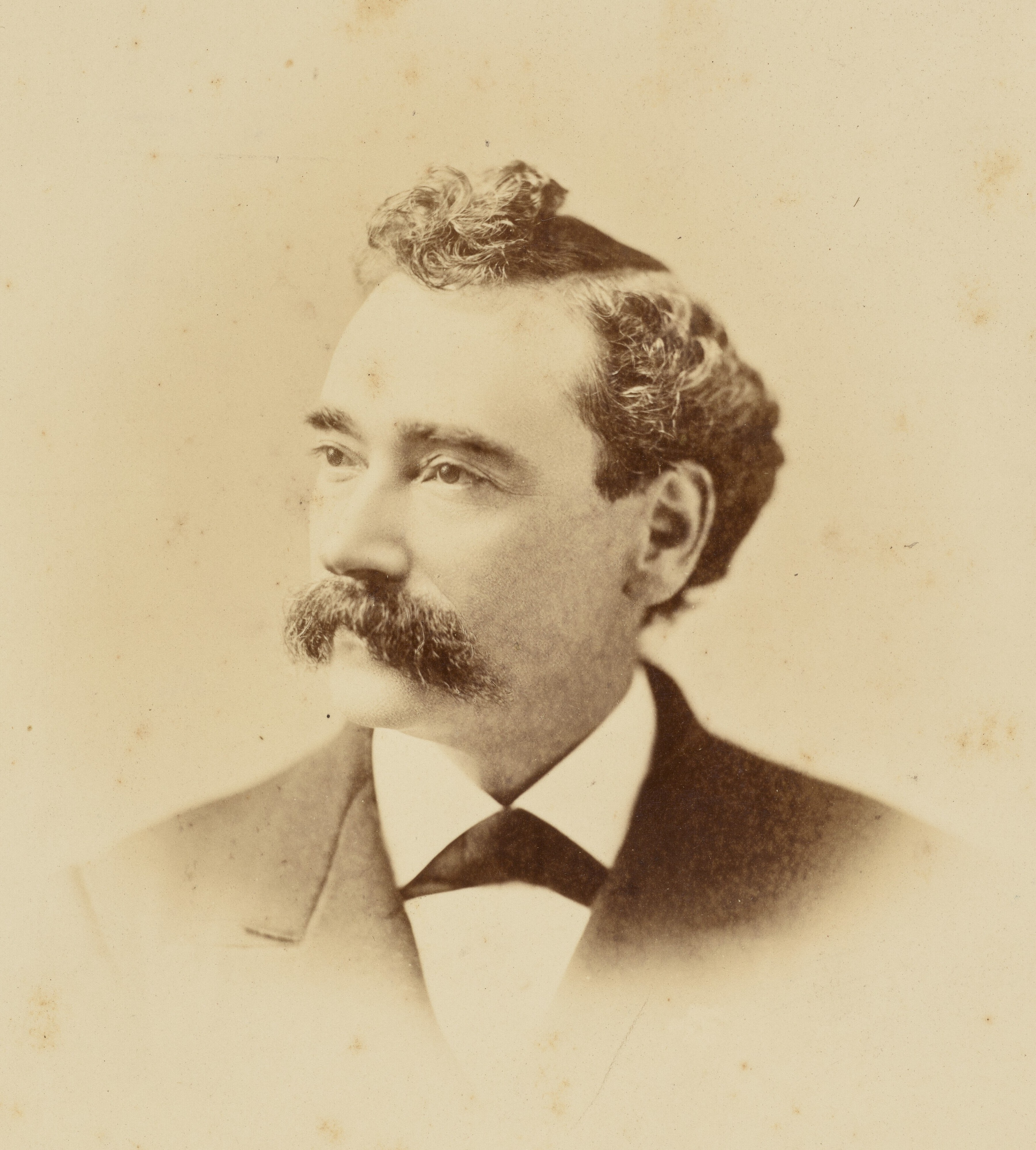
Self-portrait, 1880

Isaiah West Taber (August 17, 1830 – February 22, 1912) was an American daguerreotypist, ambrotypist, and photographer who took many pictures of noted Californians, which he donated to the California State Library "that the state may preserve the names and faces, and keep alive the memory of those who made it what it is." He was also a sketch artist and dentist. His studio also produced a series of stereoscopic views of west coast scenery.

== Biography ==
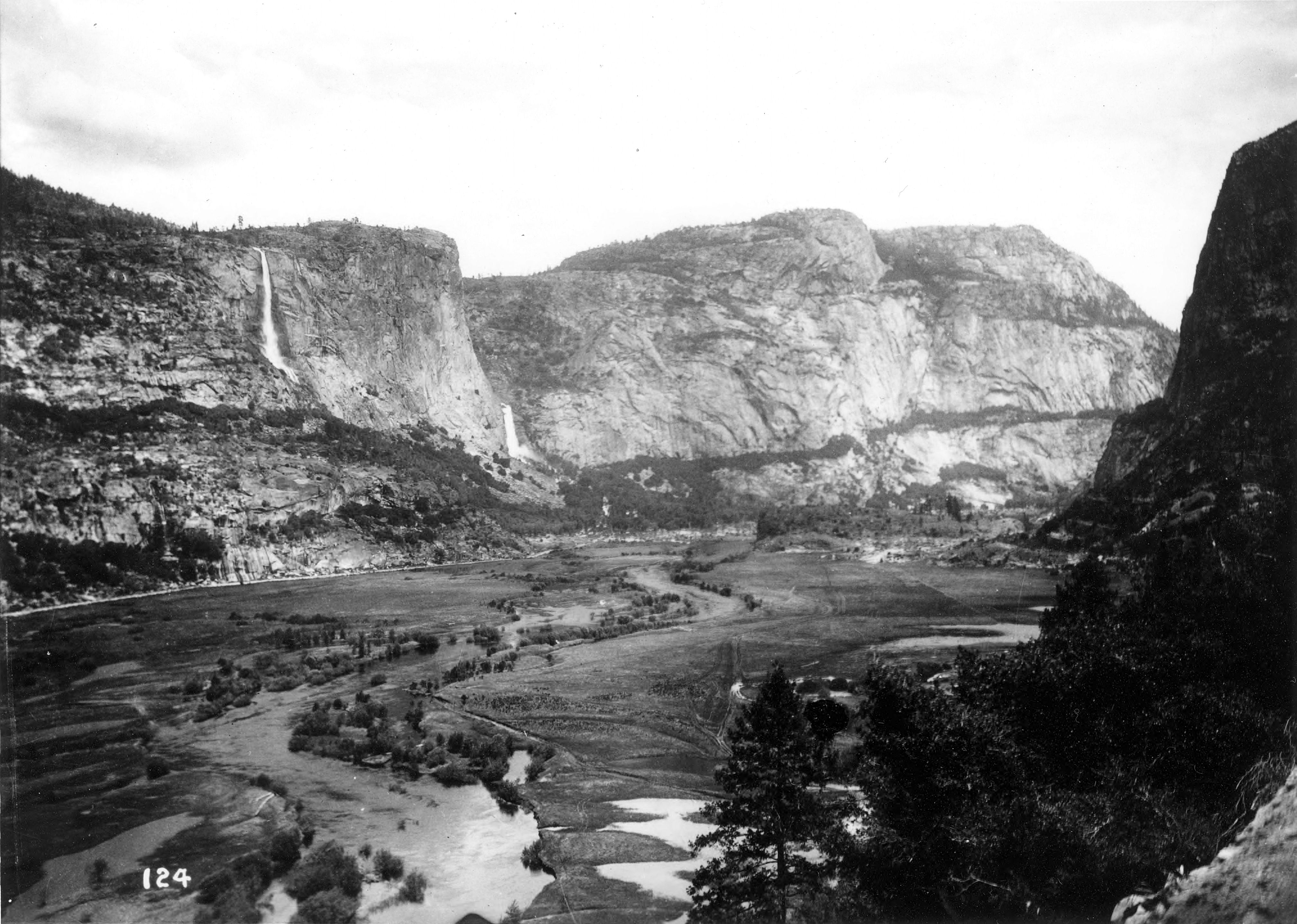
Photograph of Hetch Hetchy Valley from the Sierra Club Bulletin

Taber was born in New Bedford, Massachusetts and between 1845 and 1849 he worked at sea on a whaler. He first moved to California in 1850. He returned East in 1854 and opened his first photography studio in Syracuse, New York. In 1864, he returned to California, where he worked in the studio of Bradley and Rulofson until 1873.

In 1871, Taber opened his own studio, where he gained fame for reproducing the photos of Carleton Watkins after Watkins went bankrupt, although the reproductions were published without credit to Watkins.

An illustration of Taber's photographic parlor at 8 Montgomery Street in San Francisco, published 1890

In 1880, Taber made a six-week photographic trip to the Hawaiian Islands where, among other subjects, he photographed the Hawaiian King Kalākaua, completing a commission for three full-length portraits. The following year Kalākaua visited Taber's studio in San Francisco. At this time the Japanese photographer Suzuki Shin'ichi (1855–1912) was studying photographic techniques with Taber; Suzuki also photographed King Kalākaua (in 1881) and may have been the source of some views of Japan included in Taber's stock.

By the 1890s, Taber had expanded his operations to include studios in London, England and in elsewhere Europe. However, the 1906 San Francisco earthquake destroyed his San Francisco studio, gallery, and negative collection, ending his photographic career.

== Gallery ==
George C. Perkins, D. W. Hitchcock, W. A. Strong, and Aaron A. Sargent, 1880

Ulysses S. Grant, Rutherford B. Hayes, Richard W. Thompson, and William T. Sherman, 1880

San Francisco Board of Supervisors, 1892, I

San Francisco Board of Supervisors, 1892, II

John Hay c. 1890s
