= Mary Gage Day =

American physician, medical writer

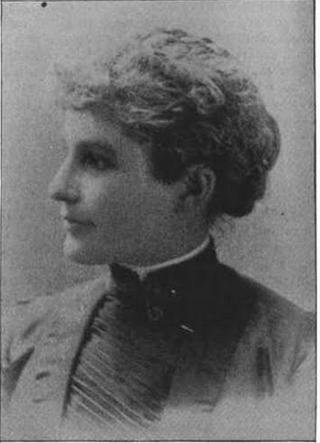
- Photo in Physicians and Surgeons of America (1896)
- Born: Mary Gage; June 20, 1857; Worcester, New York, U.S.
- Died: March 7, 1935 (aged 77)
- Education: University of Michigan
- Occupations: Physician, medical writer
- Known for: research into locoweed
- Relatives: Simon Henry Gage

Mary Gage Day (née, Gage; June 20, 1857 – March 7, 1935) was an American physician and medical writer. She was affiliated with the Michigan State Public School for Homeless Children, Benedictine Sanitarium and Hospital, Kingston City Hospital, Ulster County Tuberculosis Hospital, Benedictine Training School for Nurses, and the New York State Department of Health. Day published several papers on Locoweed, including two articles in the New York Medical Journal, from which the definition of "Loco Disease" was created in Frank Pierce Foster's New Medical Dictionary.

== Early life and education ==
Mary Gage was born June 20, 1857, in Worcester, New York. She was the daughter of Henry Van Tassell and Lucy Ann (Grover) Gage, grand-daughter of Abraham Gage. She was the seventh of nine children, one of her brothers being professor Simon Henry Gage of Cornell University. Her ancestors were British and Dutch.

She was educated in the public schools of Worcester, and was a student for a short time in the graded school of Batavia, New York. She also attended the New York Conference Seminary, at Charlotteville, New York, and passed the regents' examination at the latter institution. She passed one year studying physiology, zoology, and anatomy, in the scientific laboratories of Cornell University, in 1884, her medical preceptor being Burt Green Wilder, M. D. Day attended two courses of medical lectures in the Department of Medicine and Surgery of the University of Michigan, Ann Arbor, Michigan, and was graduated in 1888. On account of her work at Cornell, she was allowed an examination before the faculty at Ann Arbor, passed the freshman work, and entered the junior year.

== Career ==
Prior to 1879, Day taught a few terms of school. She married, January 30, 1879, Edgar B. Day, of Worcester. They became prairie pioneers in Ford County, Kansas where he labored on an irrigation project and she boarded some of the laborers.

Day commenced the practice of medicine in October, 1888, at Wichita, Kansas, which she continued for fifteen months, and then accepted a position as resident physician at the hospital of the Michigan State Public School for Homeless Children, for ten months. In 1891, she took a post-graduate course at the New York Post-Graduate Medical School and Hospital, and then returned to Wichita. Since 1897, she was at Kingston, New York as Secretary of staff and attending gynecologist to Benedictine Sanitarium and Hospital; gynecologist, Kingston City Hospital, and Ulster County Tuberculosis Hospital; and chairman and instructor of Benedictine Training School for Nurses. She was also a lecturer at the New York State Department of Health.

In 1889, after doing original research for a year and a half, Day published several papers on Locoweed, including two articles on Locoweed in the New York Medical Journal, from which the definition of “Loco Disease” was made up in Frank Pierce Foster's New Medical Dictionary. This article was written after extensive observation of the suffering caused to livestock from eating the locoweed and after much experimental work upon animals. Day was one of the contributors to the new Handbook of Therapeutics, edited by Dr. Foster. She contributed numerous several papers on other scientific and medical topics to medical journals. She also wrote "Some Useful Points in Eugenics", and circular letter in collaboration with the Commission on Moral Sanitation of New York State Federation of Women‘s Clubs (chairman of commission, 1912–13).

== Affiliations ==
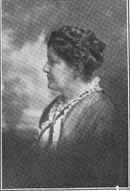
Mary Gage Day (1916)

Day was a member of the Wichita Medical Society, of which she was president, and to which she was the first woman to be admitted; in 1893, elected secretary of the section on diseases of women and obstetrics; in 1894, elected chairman same section. She was a member of the Kansas State Medical Society, being the first woman to hold office in that society; as well as a member of the American Medical Association; South Kansas Medical Society; delegate from Wichita Medical Society to First Pan-American Medical Congress; as well as a member of the New York State Medical Society and the Ulster County Medical Society. She was a member of the board of directors and physician to the Wichita Wayside Home for Women. She was a member of the Wichita Hospital staff, but resigned. She was a member of the Hypatia Club, for women, and of the Social Science Club of Western Missouri and Kansas.

She was also a member of the National Association for Prevention of Tuberculosis; Secretary of the Ulster County Commission on Prevention of Tuberculosis; permanent member of the Alumni Association of the University of Michigan; member of the New York State Woman's Medical Association, National Geographic Society, American Association for the Advancement of Science, Kingston City Hospital Association; chairman, Public Health Commission, Kingston Federation Women’s Clubs; member of Twaalfskill Country Club; and the Kingston City Library Association.

== Personal life ==
Day made her home in Kingston, where she was a member of St. John‘s Episcopal Church. She died March 7, 1935, and was buried at Maple Grove Cemetery, Worcester.
