= Old Madison County Courthouse =

- U.S. National Register of Historic Places
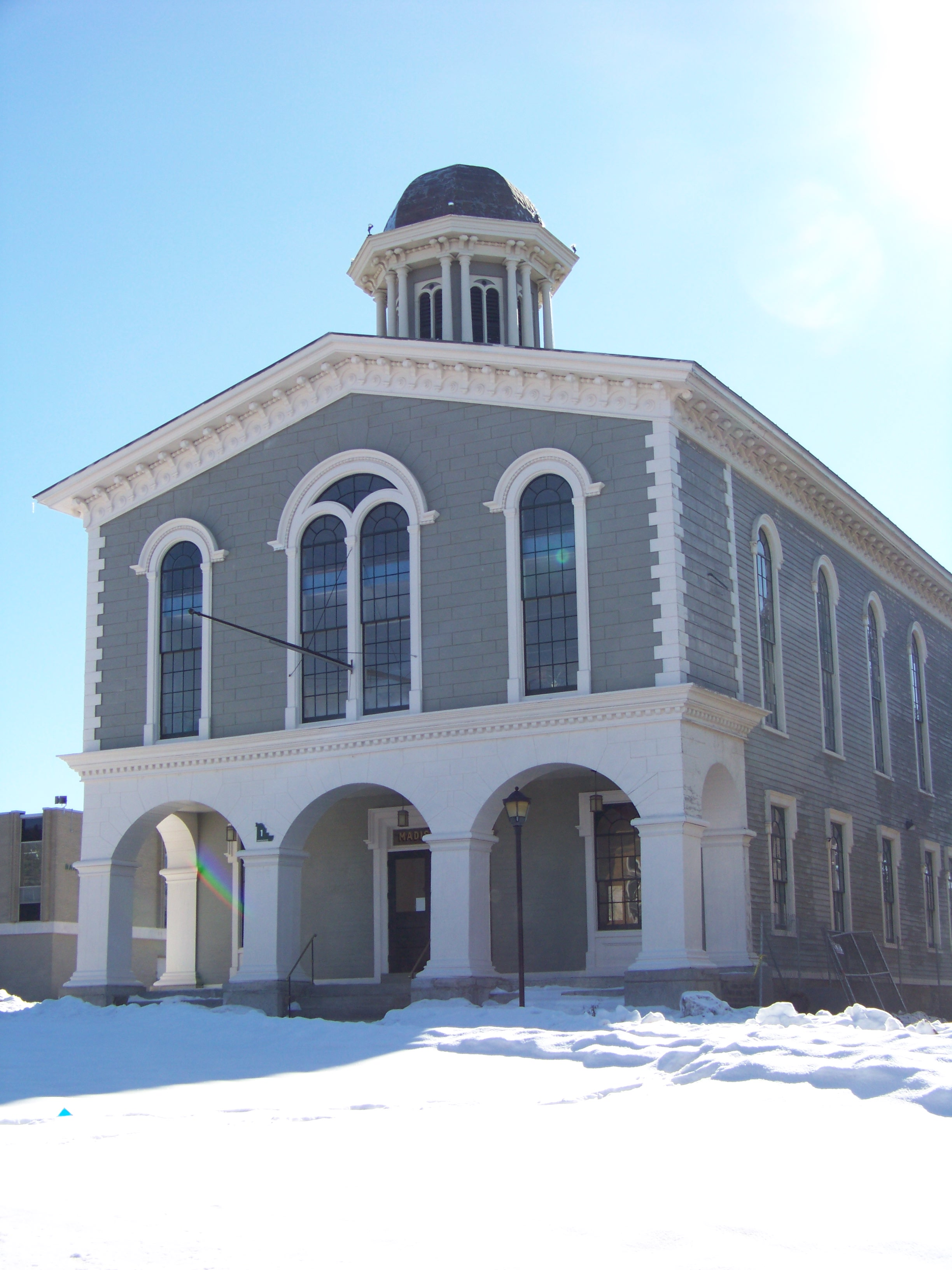

- Location within New York Location within the United States
- Interactive map showing the location of Old Madison County Courthouse
- Location: E. Main St., Morrisville, New York
- Coordinates: 42°53′53.63″N 75°38′28.74″W
- Area: less than one acre
- Built: 1865
- Architect: DeRuyter, J.K. Laas
- Architectural style: Italianate
- NRHP reference No.: 78001860
- Added to NRHP: June 15, 1978

Old Madison County Courthouse is a historic courthouse and institutional building located at Morrisville in Madison County, New York, United States. It is a detached, two-story rectangular frame building measuring 42 feet by 88 feet with a full basement. It was built in 1865 and expanded to its present size in 1877. In 1910, the building was acquired by the State of New York for classroom space for the agricultural college established at Morrisville. It was renamed Madison Hall and used for classrooms, offices, laboratories, the gymnasium, and assembly hall until 1975.

It was added to the National Register of Historic Places in 1978.
