= Edward H. Rulloff =

Canadian-born American philologist and murderer

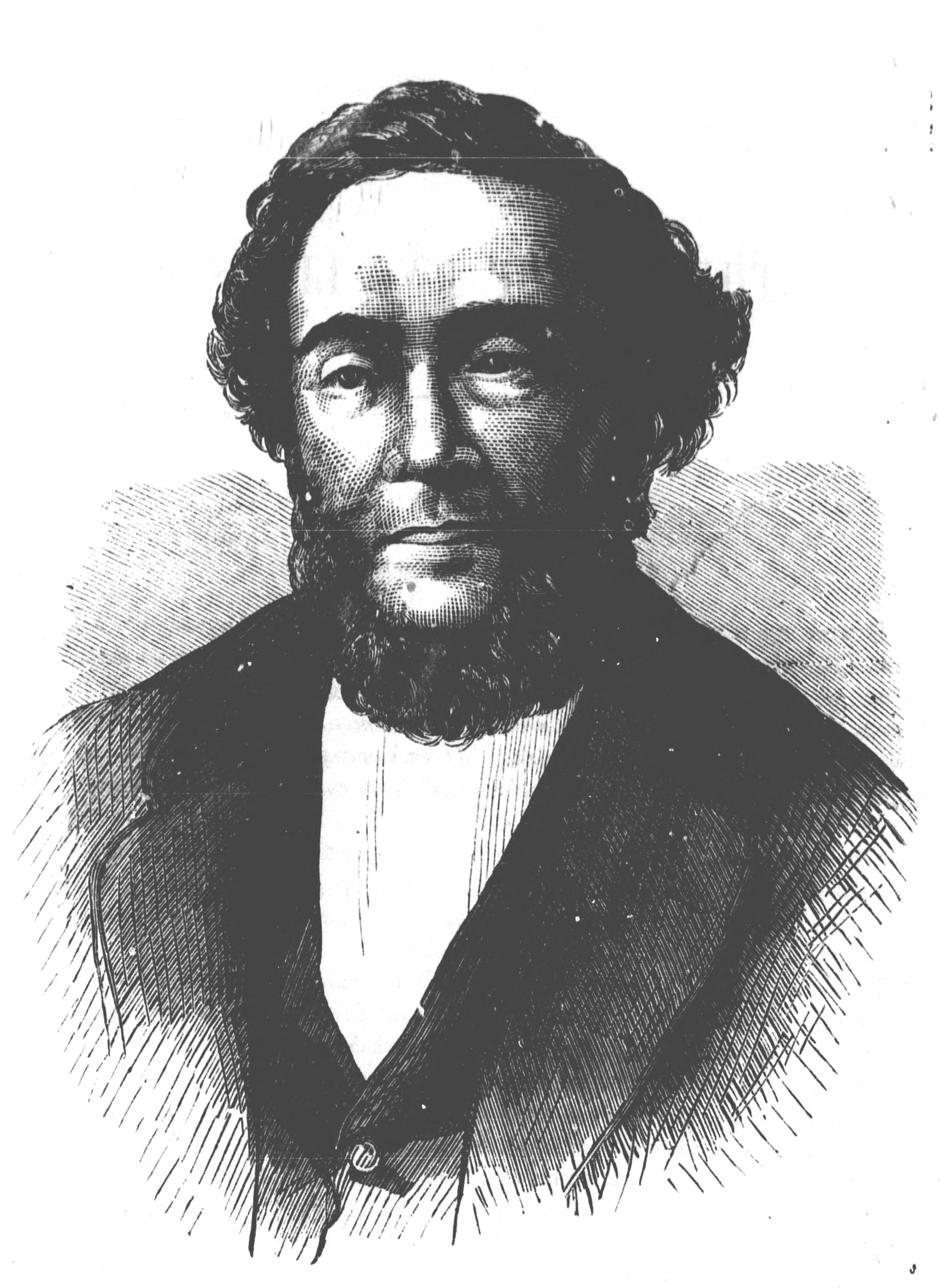
- A depiction of Edward H. Rulloff in a biography from 1871.
- Born: John Edward Howard Rulloff; 1819; Saint John, New Brunswick, Canada
- Died: May 18, 1871 (aged 51–52); Binghamton, New York, U.S.
- Cause of death: Execution by hanging
- Other names: The Genius Killer; The Man of Two Lives
- Motive: Revenge for perceived infidelity (wife and daughter), robbery (Merrick)
- Conviction: First degree murder

Details
- Victims: 3–5
- Span of crimes: 1844–1870
- Country: United States
- State: New York
- Date apprehended: 1870

John Edward Howard Rulloff (also known as Ruloff, Rulofson, or Rulloffson, as well as several aliases; 1819/1820 – May 18, 1871) was a Canadian-born American polymath and serial killer. This dichotomy was exemplified in the title of a 1871 biography, The Man of Two Lives!. He was also known as "The Genius Killer". Rulloff's brain is said to be among the largest on record.

== Early life ==
Rulloff was born near Saint John, New Brunswick, to Danish immigrant parents. His brother was photographer William Rulofson. Rulloff's "two lives" were both premature: by the time he was twenty years old, he had already worked in a law firm and served two years in prison for embezzlement and suspected arson to cover up his crimes. In 1842 he moved to Dryden in Upstate New York, where he worked as a school teacher and studied botanical medicine with Dr. Henry W. Bull. The following year, Rulloff impulsively married Bull's seventeen-year-old cousin, Harriet Schutt, with no formal courtship and against the wishes of Schutt's family, who considered him beneath their station.

== Murders of Harriet and Priscilla Rulloff ==
The couple moved to Lansing, New York, where Harriet gave birth to daughter Priscilla. Rulloff wanted to be farther away from his wife's family and pressured her to move to Ohio, where he planned to work as a lawyer or college professor. When Harriet refused and threatened to return to her family with their daughter, on June 22, 1844, Rulloff accused her of having an affair with Bull and fatally hit her on the head with a pestle, then fatally poisoned his daughter.

Rulloff decided to commit suicide, but he found himself incapable. The next day, he borrowed a horse and wagon from his neighbors, the Andersons, with the pretense of returning a wooden chest to his uncle. Besides the chest, the Andersons saw Rulloff placing a half-full sack or pillowcase in the wagon, then driving toward Cayuga Lake, in the direction opposite of his declared destination. When Rulloff returned, still with the chest, he told Mrs. Anderson that he and his wife would be out of town for a couple of weeks, and left his house in complete disarray.

Rulloff returned amid rumors that he had killed his wife. Confronted by the Schutts, he denied any murder and claimed first that his wife had abandoned him, then that they had moved to Ohio together. Neither statement was believed because Harriet's clothes and personal items had been found in the house, implying that she had not left on her own accord. Rulloff fled a second time, but he was pursued by his brother-in-law, Ephraim Schutt, who had him apprehended and brought to Ithaca to stand trial for murder.

Cayuga Lake was dredged in an attempt to locate the bodies, but they were never found. As the grand jury was unwilling to indict Rulloff for murder without a body, he was instead accused of kidnapping his wife. Rulloff conducted his own defense at his trial, in 1846, focusing on the lack of evidence that any crime had been committed. Nevertheless, he was found guilty and sentenced to ten years with hard labor in Auburn Prison.

While incarcerated, Rulloff taught himself philology and formulated his own theory about language evolution, that he intended to publish under the title The Great Secret in Philology after his release. He was even allowed to teach students in his own cell. However, his hopes of starting a career in the field were dashed when he was informed that Tompkins County would charge him with the murder of his wife as soon as he was released. Rulloff claimed double jeopardy and started a legal battle from jail. The district attorney dropped the charge for Harriet Rulloff's murder, but replaced it with one for Priscilla's. Rulloff was in turn found guilty of this crime in 1858, but he escaped custody before the verdict reached him.

== Life after his escape ==
Rulloff was likely assisted in his escape by the son of Ithaca's undersheriff, Albert Jarvis, who had been tutored in Greek and Latin by Rulloff, and would later become his partner in crime; or by Jarvis's mother Jane, who had also befriended Rulloff, and publicly manifested her disbelief in his being a murderer. Whatever the case, Rulloff fled west, alone and on foot. He fed on wild nuts and food stolen from farms, and lost two toes to frostbite.

Reaching Meadville, Pennsylvania, he introduced himself to local inventor A. B. Richmond under the alias "James Nelson", and convinced him to start a business partnership after Rulloff brandished his knowledge in subjects as varied as conchology, mineralogy, forensic anthropology and entomology. Rulloff made a similar impression at Jefferson College (now called Washington & Jefferson College) in southwestern Pennsylvania, and was about to take a professorship when Jarvis wrote him, informing him that his mother and himself were now destitute, and threatening him if he did not help them out. Rulloff robbed a jewelry store with the intention of giving the bounty to the Jarvises, but he was arrested and sent back to Ithaca. In spite of being a murder convict, a fugitive, and a robber, Rulloff appealed his murder conviction successfully, was acquitted, and was released after authorities decided to not prosecute him for other offenses.

Rulloff moved to New York City with Jarvis, where they survived as burglars. In 1861, Rulloff was arrested and sentenced to serve two and a half years in Sing Sing Prison. There he met his second partner in crime, William T. Dexter. In 1869, Rulloff learned of the forthcoming first convention of the American Philological Association in Poughkeepsie, and sent a manuscript detailing his theory in language evolution, which he titled Method in the Formation of Language. He used the alias "Professor Euri Lorio", and announced his intention to auction the manuscript for a starting sum of $500,000. Although Rulloff believed that his findings would revolutionize the field, the Association rejected them and none of its members bid for the text.

== Murder of Frederick Merrick ==
Rulloff, Jarvis and Dexter's next plan was the robbery of a dry goods store in Binghamton, New York, in 1870, while the two live-in clerks, Frederick Merrick and Gilbert Burrows, slept upstairs. The trio burned chloroform in an attempt to ensure that the employees would sleep through the ordeal, but they awoke when Jarvis stumbled on something. Merrick first attempted to shoot Rulloff with a gun that he kept under his pillow, but it failed to discharge. After that, he grabbed a stool and threw it at the fleeing Rulloff.

Meanwhile, Burrows grabbed Dexter and proceeded to beat him. When Merrick joined Burrows, Jarvis and Rulloff came to Dexter's rescue, and Rulloff fired a warning shot in to the air. Burrows stopped, but Merrick threw himself at Jarvis. Rulloff fired a second warning shot, and when Merrick would not desist, he pointed the gun at Merrick's head and fired, killing him instantly.

In their disorderly escape, the robbers missed the boat that was to ferry them across the Chenango River, and instead attempted to swim across the river. The exhausted Jarvis and Dexter were unable to keep up with the current and drowned (though, after Rulloff's arrest, there was speculation that he may have drowned them). Their bodies were recovered in the morning. Rulloff made it across, but he left behind a couple of leather boots with a distinctive depression where his missing toes would have been.

== Arrest and execution ==
Alerted by Burrows, the Binghamton police organized patrols and rounded up men that looked suspicious. Rulloff made himself a suspect the next morning, when he ignored a request to identify himself at the local railroad station and ran across the train tracks to a nearby farm's outhouse, where he was captured. Rulloff identified himself first as "Charles Augustus", and later as "George Williams". He was brought before the bodies of Dexter and Jarvis, which had been publicly displayed to help identify them; he denied knowing them.

However, Rulloff himself was recognized by another onlooker, Judge Ransom Balcom, who said: "You are Edward H. Rulloff. You murdered your wife and child in Lansing in 1845 [sic]." He then turned to the authorities and warned: "This man understands his rights better than you do, and will defend them to the last." Documents found on Dexter's and Jarvis's bodies later led investigators to a Brooklyn apartment owned by Rulloff under yet another name, Edward C. Howard.

Rulloff's trial began on January 4, 1871. It became a sensation that attracted crowds of 2,000 people daily. Some, such as the director of the New York Tribune, Horace Greeley, believed that a man with the evident intellectual prowess of Rulloff was too valuable to be executed and should be spared, regardless of his guilt. Rulloff himself, who led his own defense again, refused to plead insanity and requested that Governor John T. Hoffman either pardon him or delay his execution until his theory on language evolution was fully developed, claiming that he would be ready to die after that.

Mark Twain wrote a letter to the Tribune in which he satirized the requests of clemency for Rulloff, stating his willingness to produce a different man that would admit to Rulloff's crime and be executed in his place. On March 3, Rulloff was found guilty and sentenced to hang. While on death row, he confessed to the murder of his wife and described it in detail, but he never admitted to having killed his daughter. This caused some speculation that he had sent her to live with relatives under a different name and had not killed her.

Rulloff's execution on May 18, 1871 was not the last public hanging in New York state. Some sources claim he gave a speech on the gallows, ending with "Hurry it up! I want to be in hell in time for dinner." Other sources say that his only statement was "I can't stand still." His brain was taken to Cornell University after his execution, where a professor, Burt Wilder, declared Rulloff's brain to be the largest on record (at that time). It is now thought to be the second largest, with a weight of 1770 grams. It can be seen on display at the Wilder Brain Collection in the psychology department of Cornell University in Ithaca, New York.

== See also ==
- Eugene Aram, another philologist-murderer
- List of serial killers in the United States

== Sources ==
- The Man of Two Lives, by Murder by Gaslight.
- The Life and Madness of Edward H. Rulloff , by Victorian Gothic. Based on Edward H. Rulloff: The Veil of Secrecy Removed (1871), by E. H. Freeman.
- Edmund Pearson, Instigation of the Devil (New York, London: Charles Scribner's Sons, 1930), Chapter XXI: The "Learned" Murderer, pp. 255–264, 354
- Rulloff: the great criminal and philologist by Samuel D. Halliday, 1905
