= Simon Henry Gage =

American academic and professor (1851–1944)

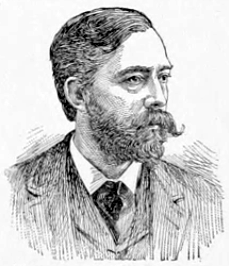
- Born: May 20, 1851; Milford Township, Otsego County, New York, United States
- Died: October 20, 1944 (aged 93); Interlaken, New York
- Education: Cornell University
- Known for: The Microscope
- Spouses: Susanna Stuart Phelps (m. 1881; died 1915) Clara Covert Starrett (m. 1933)
- Scientific career
- Fields: Microscopy, Histology, Natural History

Simon Henry Gage (May 20, 1851 – October 20, 1944) was a professor of anatomy, Histology, and Embryology at Cornell University and an important figure in the history of American microscopy. His book, The Microscope, appeared in seventeen editions. In 1931, a volume of the American Journal of Anatomy was dedicated to Gage on the occasion of his eightieth birthday.

== Personal life ==
Simon Henry Gage was born on May 20, 1851, in Milford Township, Otsego County, New York. He was the son of Henry van Tassel Gage and Lucy Ann Grover Gage. His sister, Mary Gage Day, was a physician and medical writer. Simon Henry Gage attended Charlottesville Seminary and the State Normal School at Albany. In December 1881, he married Susanna Stuart Phelps of Morrisville, New York, one of his students, who became an accomplished embryologist. They had one son, Henry Phelps Gage, who was born on October 4, 1886. Susanna died in 1915, and in 1933, Gage married Clara Covert Starrett of Interlaken, New York.

== University life ==
In 1873, Gage entered Cornell University and graduated in 1877 with a B. S. in Natural History after writing a thesis on the life history of the Cayuga Lake Stargazer (Cottus). As an undergraduate, Gage worked in the Department of Anatomy with Burt Green Wilder teaching in the newly introduced biology courses. In the fall of 1877, Gage became an instructor of Comparative Anatomy and Microscopy. In 1881, Gage became an assistant professor of Physiology and Lecturer in Microscopical Technology. In 1889, Gage became an associate professor of Physiology and Lecturer on Microscopical Technology and in 1893, Gage became an associate professor of anatomy, Histology, and Embryology. In 1895, Gage became a professor of anatomy, Histology, and Embryology. In 1908, Gage retired as Professor Emeritus of Histology and Embryology. Gage came out of retirement in 1918 returning to teaching as a result of the shortage of teachers caused by World War I. In addition to his work on microscopy and optic projection, Gage did research on the newt, toad, lamprey, fat digestion and on the pancreas.

In 1893, Gage and John Henry Comstock founded the Comstock Publishing Company in order to make textbooks on microscopy, histology, and entomology available at a reasonable price to students and to publish the works of Anna Botsford Comstock on nature study. In 1931, Gage gave the company to Cornell University as a gift. Gage, along with Luzerne Corville and the architect, William H. Miller, designed Stimson Hall, which housed the Cornell Medical College. In 1915, Gage and his son started a memorial fund for Susanna Phelps Gage that was used to build a room in Clara Dickson Hall, the new dormitory for women. In 1918, they endowed the Susanna Phelps Gage Endowment for research in physics. Gage served as the faculty representative to the Cornell University Board of Trustees from 1921 to 1922. Gage was instrumental in starting the Flower Library in the Veterinary College of Cornell University in 1897. Gage served as the responsible librarian of the Van Cleef Memorial Library of medicine in Stimson Hall from 1922 to 1944. Upon his death in 1944, Gage donated his brain to the Wilder Brain Collection at Cornell University where it can still be seen on the second floor of Uris Hall. Gage's personal book collection and papers can be found in the Rare and Manuscript Collections of the Cornell University Library.

== Microscopy ==
Gage was active in the American Microscopical Society since its founding, and was elected President of the society twice, in 1895 and in 1906. Gage wrote seventeen editions of The Microscope, a series of editions that traced the evolution of microscopy, and which included the Darkfield and the Ultra-Violet editions.

Gage died at his home in Interlaken, New York on October 20, 1944.

== Publications ==
- Richards, O. W., editor (1964). Microscopy in America (1830-1945) By Simon Henry Gage. Transactions of the American Microscopical Society, LXXXIII, No. 4, Supplement, October 1964, 125 p. www.jstor.org

=== Research papers ===
- Gage, S. H. (1880-1881) Microscopical Technology. Ithaca, New York, 54 p.
- Gage, S. H. (1885-1886) Notes on Histological Methods, Second edition. Andrus & Church, Ithaca, New York, 56 p. Notes on Histological Methods
- Gage, S. H. (1887) Notes on Histological Methods, For the Use of Students of the Anatomical Department of Cornell University, Second edition. Andrus & Church, Ithaca, New York, 32 p.
- Gage, S. H. (1891) The Microscope and Histology; Part I The Microscope and Microscopical Methods, Third edition. Andrus & Church, Ithaca, New York, 96 p. The Microscope
- Gage, S. H. (1892) The Microscope and Histology; Part I The Microscope and Microscopical Methods, Fourth edition. James W. Queen & Co., Philadelphia, Pennsylvania, 96 p.
- Gage, S. H. (1893) The Lake and Brook Lampreys of New York; Especially Those of Cayuga and Seneca Lakes. Reprinted from The Wilder Quarter-Century Book, 421-493 + maps and plates.
- Gage, S. H. (1894) The Microscope and Histology; Part I The Microscope and Microscopical Methods, Fifth edition. Comstock Publishing Co., Ithaca, New York, 165 p.
- Gage, S. H. (1896). "The Processes of Life Revealed by the Microscope; A Plea for Physiological Histology". Transactions of the American Microscopical Society. 17 (34): 3–29. doi:10.2307/3221394. JSTOR 3221394. PMID 17835005. Also, Smithsonian Institution Report 381-396 (1896). Printed almost entirely in Science n.s. 2 209-218 (1895) and in American Monthly Microscopical Journal 16, 292-311 (1895).
- Gage, S. H. (1896) The Microscope and Microscopical Methods, Sixth edition. Comstock Publishing Co., Ithaca, New York, 237 p. The Microscope
- Gage, S. H. (1899) The Microscope; An Introduction to Microscopic Methods and to Histology, Seventh edition revised. Comstock Publishing Co., Ithaca, New York, 237 p. The Microscope
- Gage, S. H. (1901) The Microscope; An Introduction to Microscopic Methods and to Histology, Eighth edition. Comstock Publishing Co., Ithaca, New York, 299 p. The Microscope
- Gage, S. H. (1904) The Microscope; An Introduction to Microscopic Methods and to Histology, Ninth edition. Comstock Publishing Co., Ithaca, New York, 299 p. The Microscope
- Gage, S. H. (1908) The Microscope; An Introduction to Microscopic Methods and to Histology, Tenth edition. Comstock Publishing Co., Ithaca, New York, 359 p. The Microscope
- Gage, S. H. (1911) The Microscope; An Introduction to Microscopic Methods and to Histology, 11th edition. Comstock Publishing Co., Ithaca, New York, 359 p. The Microscope
- Gage, S. H. (1917) The Microscope; An Introduction to Microscopic Methods and to Histology, Twelfth edition. Comstock Publishing Co., Ithaca, New York, 472 p.The Microscope
- Gage, S. H. (1920) The Microscope; An Introduction to Microscopic Methods and to Histology, Thirteenth edition. Comstock Publishing Co., Ithaca, New York, 474 p. The Microscope
- Gage, S. H. (1920) Modern Dark-Field Microscopy and the History of its Development. Transactions of the American Microscopical Society XXXIX (2) 95–141. The Microscope
- Gage, S. H. (1925) The Microscope; An Introduction to Microscopic Methods and to Histology, Darkfield (14th) edition. Comstock Publishing Co., Ithaca, New York, 517 p. Second Printing 1927.
- Gage, S. H. (1932) The Microscope, Ultra-Violet (15th) edition. Comstock Publishing Co., Ithaca, New York, 589 p. The Microscope
- Gage, S. H. (1936) The Microscope, Sixteenth edition. Comstock Publishing Co., Ithaca, New York, 615 p. The Microscope
- Gage, S. H. (1941) The Microscope, Seventeenth edition. Comstock Publishing Co., Ithaca, New York, 617 p. Second Printing 1943.
- Gage, S. H. and GAGE, H. P. (1914) Optic Projection; Principles, Installation and Use of the Magic Lantern, Projection Microscope, Reflecting Lantern, Moving Picture Machine. Comstock Publishing Co., Ithaca, New York, 731 p. Optic Projection
