= Helen H. Gardener =

American author, intellectual, activist and government functionary

Helen Hamilton Gardener
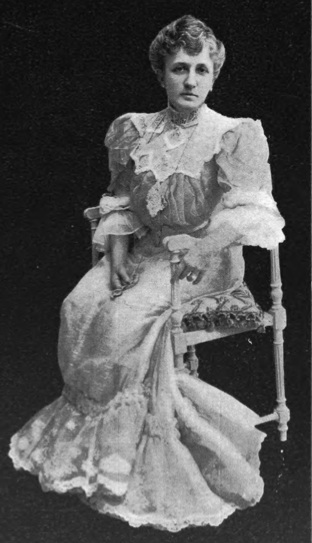
- Born: Alice Chenoweth; January 23, 1853; Winchester, Virginia
- Died: July 26, 1925 (aged 72); Washington, D.C.
- Other name: Helen Hamilton Gardener
- Occupations: Writer, lecturer, civil servant, suffragist
- Years active: 1885–1924

Helen Hamilton Gardener (1853–1925), born Alice Chenoweth, was an American author, rationalist public intellectual, political activist, and government functionary. Gardener produced many lectures, articles, and books during the 1880s and 1890s and is remembered today for her role in the freethought and women's suffrage movements and for her place as a pioneering woman in the top echelon of the American civil service.

== Biography ==
=== Early years ===
Alice Chenoweth, best remembered by her pen name, Helen Hamilton Gardener, was born near Winchester, Virginia, on January 21, 1853. She was the youngest of six children born to Rev. Alfred Griffith Chenoweth, an Episcopalian minister who had become a Methodist circuit rider, and his wife, the former Katherine A. Peel. The Chenoweth family traced its American antecedents back to a certain Arthur Chenoweth who had arrived in the fledgling Province of Maryland in 1635 to receive a grant of land for honorable service to Lord Baltimore.

The Chenoweth family subsequently made their way to Virginia, where Alice's father had inherited slaves. As objectors to the institution of slavery, the Chenoweths manumitted their slaves in 1853 over the existing legal obstacles to that course of action. The family moved to Washington, D.C. shortly thereafter. This was followed in 1855 by a move to Greencastle, Indiana. During the American Civil War, Chenoweth's father served the Federal cause, returning to the enemy state of Virginia to serve as a guide for Union troops there.

Alice Chenoweth received an excellent education and showed an interest in and aptitude for science and sociology. She associated with older people as a girl and read extensively on serious themes. She studied with tutors and attended various local schools, moving to Cincinnati, Ohio in her late teen years, where she graduated high school. After leaving high school Chenoweth enrolled in the Cincinnati Normal School, from which she graduated in June 1873.

Chenoweth worked as a schoolteacher for two years, giving up the profession (as was generally the case in the day) when she married in 1875. Her first husband, Charles Selden Smart, was nearly two decades her senior and served at the time as Ohio State School Commissioner. The couple moved to New York City in 1880, where Charles entered the insurance business while Alice attended biology courses at Columbia University, albeit not in pursuit of a degree. Chenoweth-Smart also lectured on sociology as part of the adult education program at the Brooklyn Institute of Arts and Sciences and tried her hand at writing for local newspapers under a variety of masculine pseudonyms.

=== Literary career ===
During her first years in New York City Chenoweth-Smart made the acquaintance of Robert G. Ingersoll, the leading rationalist orator of the day. At Ingersoll's persistent request in January 1884 Alice Chenoweth-Smart began herself to deliver a series of public lectures, talks dealing with such skeptical themes as "Men, Women, and Gods," "Historical Facts and Theological Fictions," "By Divine Right," and "Rome or Reason." Many of these were collected into her first book, Men, Women, and Gods, and Other Lectures, which was issued in hard covers by the radical freethought publication, The Truth Seeker. Chenoweth-Smart published this book under the pen name "Helen Hamilton Gardener"—a pseudonym which she would use professionally for the rest of her life, eventually adopting this as her own legal name.

A number of short stories and essays by Gardener followed over the second half of the 1880s, pieces which were published in a number of leading magazines of the day. Throughout the period, Gardener's interest in feminism grew. Gardener's initial public lectures attempted particularly to demonstrate a linkage between Christianity and the subjugation of women and in 1887 the published views of former Surgeon General of the United States William A. Hammond attesting a neurological basis for female inferiority moved Gardener to even greater concern with the topic.

Gardener began working with neurologist Edward C. Spitzka to refute Hammond's thesis of inherent inferiority of the female brain. Gardener ultimately produced a paper entitled "Sex in Brain" that was read to the 1888 convention of the International Council of Women in Washington, DC. In this work, Gardener argued that no connection between brain weight and intellectual capacity had been established and challenged Hammond's methodology of comparing the prized specimen brains of leading men with those of indigent women. Gardener emerged from the Hammond controversy as a leading public speaker for women's rights. In 1893 she would deliver three more scholarly papers on feminist themes to the Congress of Representative Women held in Chicago in conjunction with the World's Columbian Exposition.

During the early 1890s, Gardener emerged as a novelist. A pair of books were written which together dealt with the theme of the double standard of morality between the sexes—Is This Your Son, My Lord? (1891) and Pray You Sir, Whose Daughter? Both were published by a leading liberal political magazine of the day, The Arena. Is This Your Son, My Lord? was sharply critical of the low age of consent then in force and the ruin of innocence by the lustful desires of outwardly respectable men. The book sold an impressive 25,000 copies in its first five months after publication and elicited shocked commentary from critics and readers alike.

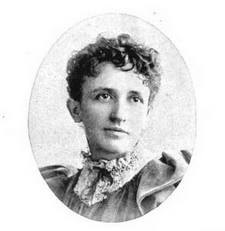
Helen H. Gardener (1894)

In 1894, Gardener published a slightly fictionalized account of her father's life entitled An Unofficial Patriot. The book's protagonist, patterned after her father, represented a positive male character at variance with those which dominated Gardener's earlier books. The book was critically well received and served as the basis for an 1899 play by playwright James A. Herne, The Reverend Griffith Davenport.

=== Political career ===
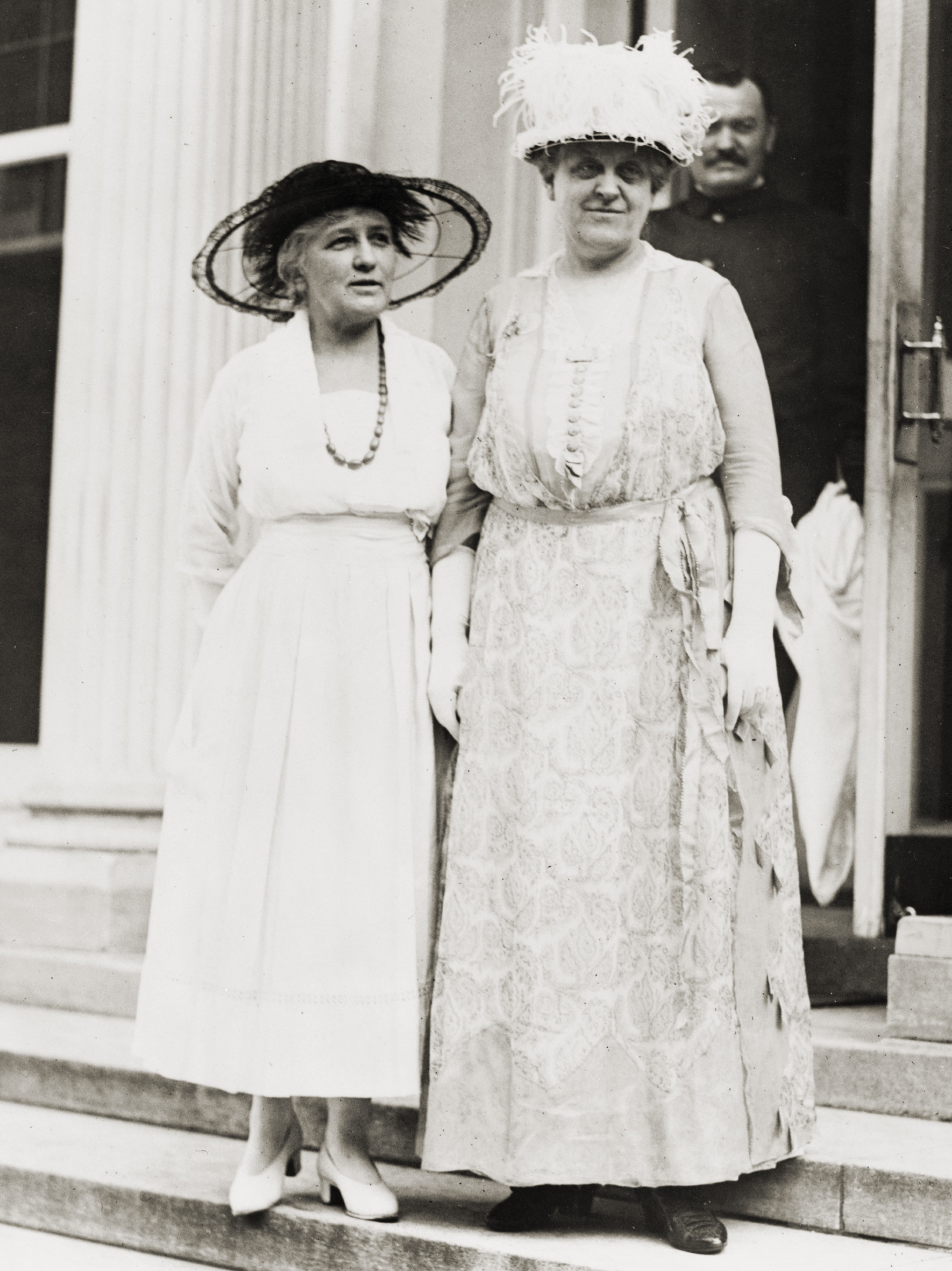
Helen Hamilton Gardener (left) exiting the White House with American feminist leader Carrie Chapman Catt (1920)

In 1907, Gardener returned to Washington, D.C., where she took up the suffrage cause. In 1913 she was appointed a position to the Congressional Committee of the National American Woman Suffrage Association, becoming, six years later, its vice-chairwoman; she was elected as one of NAWSA's vice-presidents as chief liaison under the Woodrow Wilson administration, in 1917.

In 1920, Wilson appointed her to the United States Civil Service Commission, the first woman to occupy such a high federal position.

=== Death and legacy ===
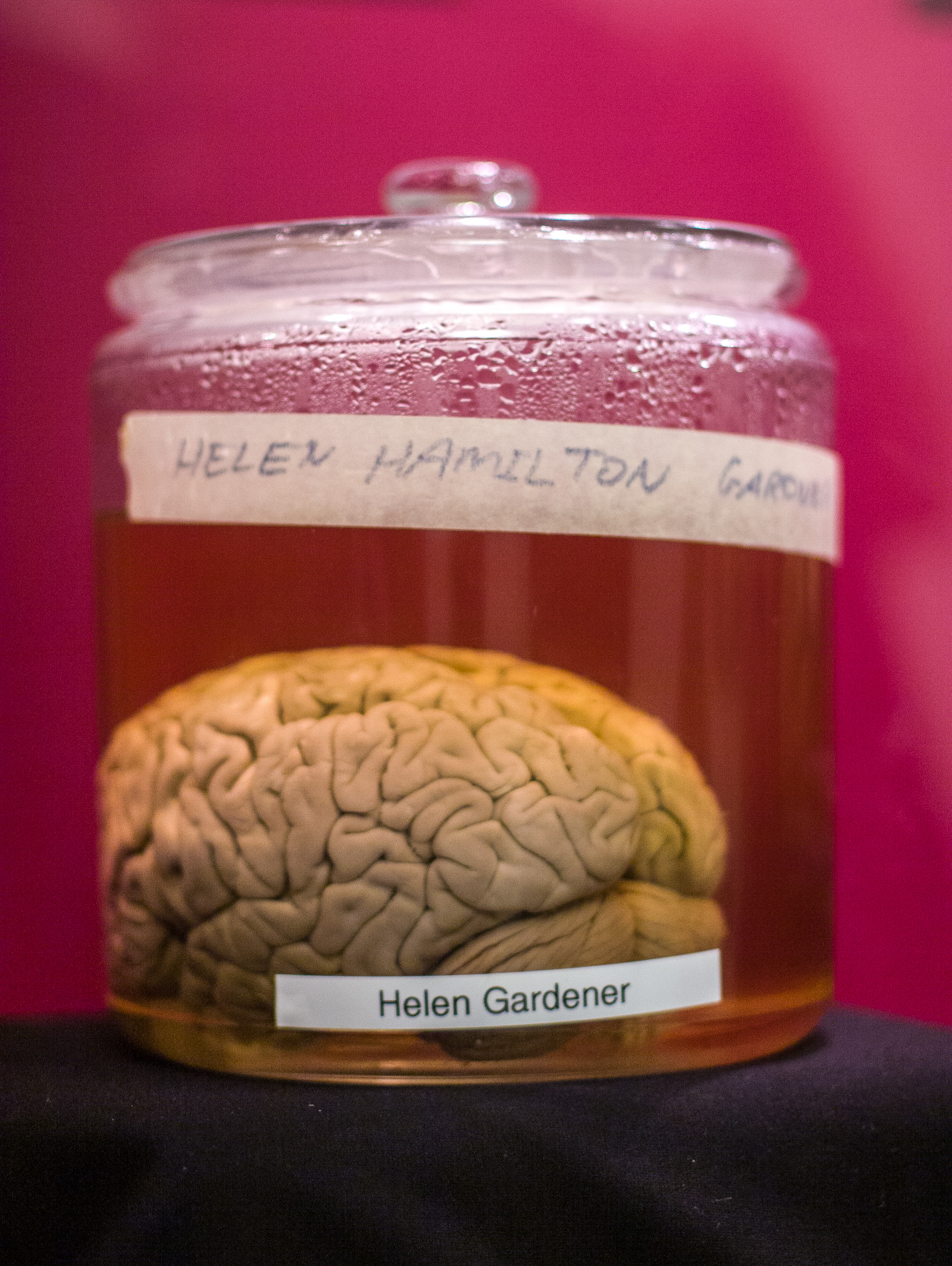
Gardener's brain is part of the Wilder Brain Collection at Cornell University.

Gardener died in July 1925 in Washington, D.C. of chronic myocarditis. Keeping with her interest in the topic, Gardener's brain was donated for scientific study before her body was cremated and its ashes interred at Arlington National Cemetery beside the grave of her second husband.

Gardener's papers are housed at the Schlesinger Library of Harvard University at Cambridge, Massachusetts as part of its Woman's Rights Collection. An online finding aid of this material, which is encompassed in eight archival folders, is available. This material has been microfilmed by University Publications of America.

Gardener's brain is part of the Wilder Brain Collection at Cornell University.

== Works ==
- Men, Women, and Gods, and Other Lectures. Introduction by Robert G. Ingersoll. New York: The Truth Seeker Company, 1885.
- "Sex in Brain," paper delivered to the International Council of Women, 1888.
- A Thoughtless Yes. New York: R.F. Fenno and Company, 1890.
- Pushed by Unseen Hands. New York: R.F. Fenno and Company, 1890.
- Is This Your Son, My Lord? A Novel (1891). Boston: Arena Publishing Company, 1894.
- Pray You Sir, Whose Daughter? Boston: Arena Publishing Company, 1892.
- Pulpit, Pew, and Cradle. New York: The Truth Seeker Company, 1892.
- Facts and Fictions of Life. Chicago: Charles H. Kerr & Co., 1893.
- An Unofficial Patriot. Boston: Arena Publishing Company, 1894.
- "Philosophers Afloat," The Arena, August 1895, pp. 480–485.
- Have Children a Right to Legal Protection? Boston: Arena Publishing Company, 1896.
- Plain Talk: A Pamphlet on the Population Question and the Moral Responsibility of Woman in Maternity. Chicago: G.E. Wilson, n.d.
- Woman Suffrage, Which Way? New York: National Woman Suffrage Publishing Co., n.d. [c. 1915]
