= Sutherland Simpson =

Scottish physician

Sutherland Simpson FRSE (3 February 1863 – 2 March 1926) was a Scottish physician who emigrated to the United States to become Professor of Physiology at Cornell University.

== Life ==
He was born at Saraquoy on the island of Flotta in the Orkney Isles on 3 February 1863, the eldest son of Margaret (née Taylor) and Sutherland Simpson. He attended a school on the island run by the Society in Scotland for Propagating Christian Knowledge. He worked on his father's croft and aimed to be master of a sailing ship so studied navigation under a teacher on the island, John Brown Gorrie.

Around 1881, he went to Leith near Edinburgh seeking work on a ship but, failing in this took a position as a laboratory assistant in the Physiology Department at the University of Edinburgh under Professor William Rutherford. He took seven years of evening classes to gain a general degree then became eligible to study medicine at the university. He graduated MB ChB in 1899, aged 36. In the same year Rutherford died and was replaced by Professor Edward Albert Sharpey-Schafer. He continued as his lab assistant gaining his first doctorate (MD) in 1901 and second (DSc) in 1903.

From 1902 he lectured in Experimental Physiology at the University of Edinburgh. In 1908 Sharpey-Schafer was invited to Cornell University and asked to recommend a professor of Physiology and Biochemistry. He recommended Simpson changing his life forever and Simpson began later that year.

In 1911, he was elected a Fellow of the Royal Society of Edinburgh. His proposers were Sir Edward Albert Sharpey-Schafer, Sir William Turner, William Cramer and George Chrystal.

== Death ==
He died at Cayuga Heights, New York near Ithaca on 3 March 1926, aged 63. His brain is on display at Cornell as part of the Wilder Brain Collection.

== Family ==
He was married twice: firstly to Margaret Drever, secondly to Catherine Anderson. He had three children: Sutherland, Ethel and Ralph.

== Artistic recognition ==
He was portrayed by Norwegian artist Christian Midjo.
