= Wilder Brain Collection =

Brain collection at Cornell University

Coordinates: 42.4472°N 76.4822°W

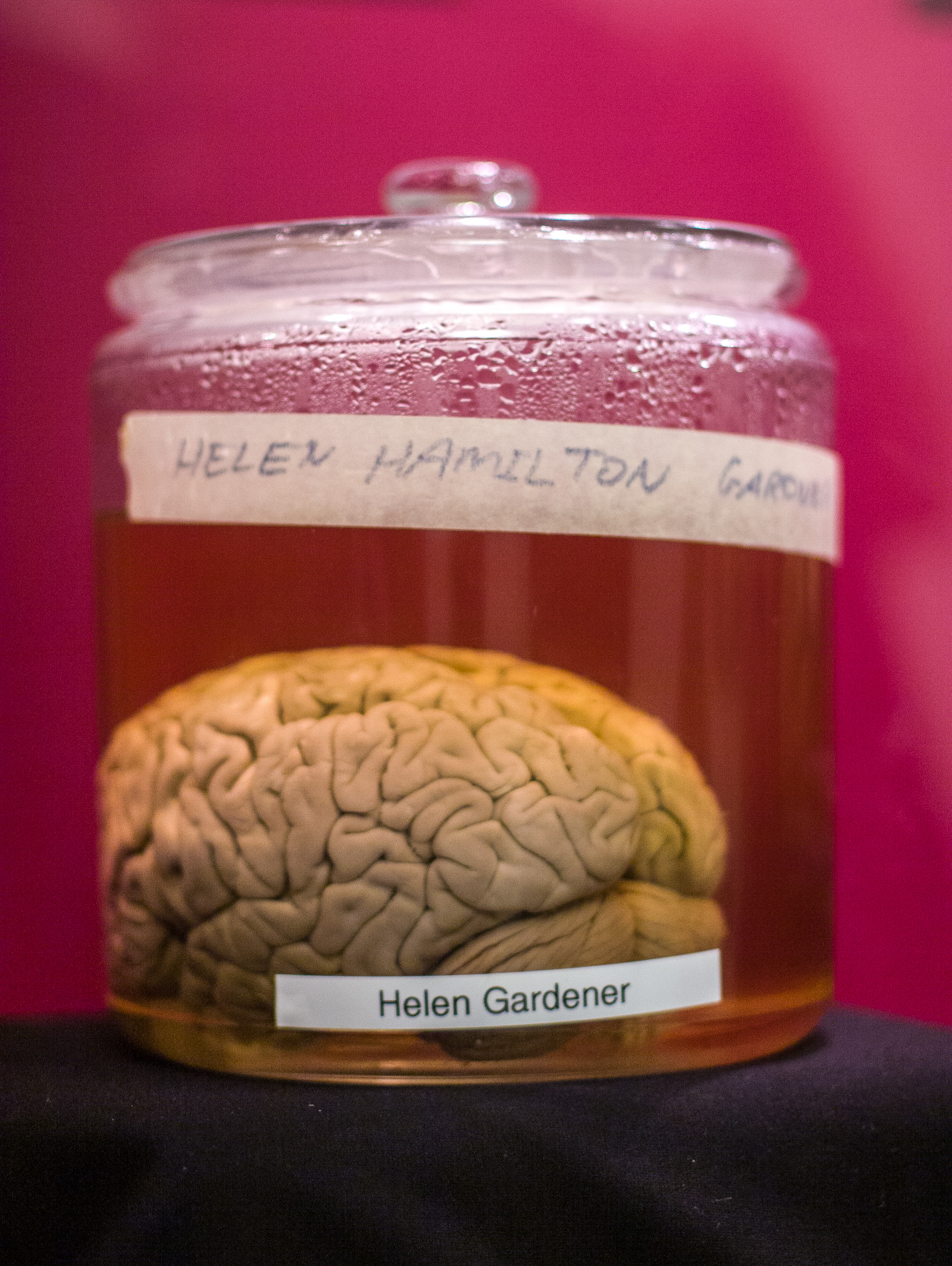
Helen Hamilton Gardener's brain is part of the Wilder Brain Collection

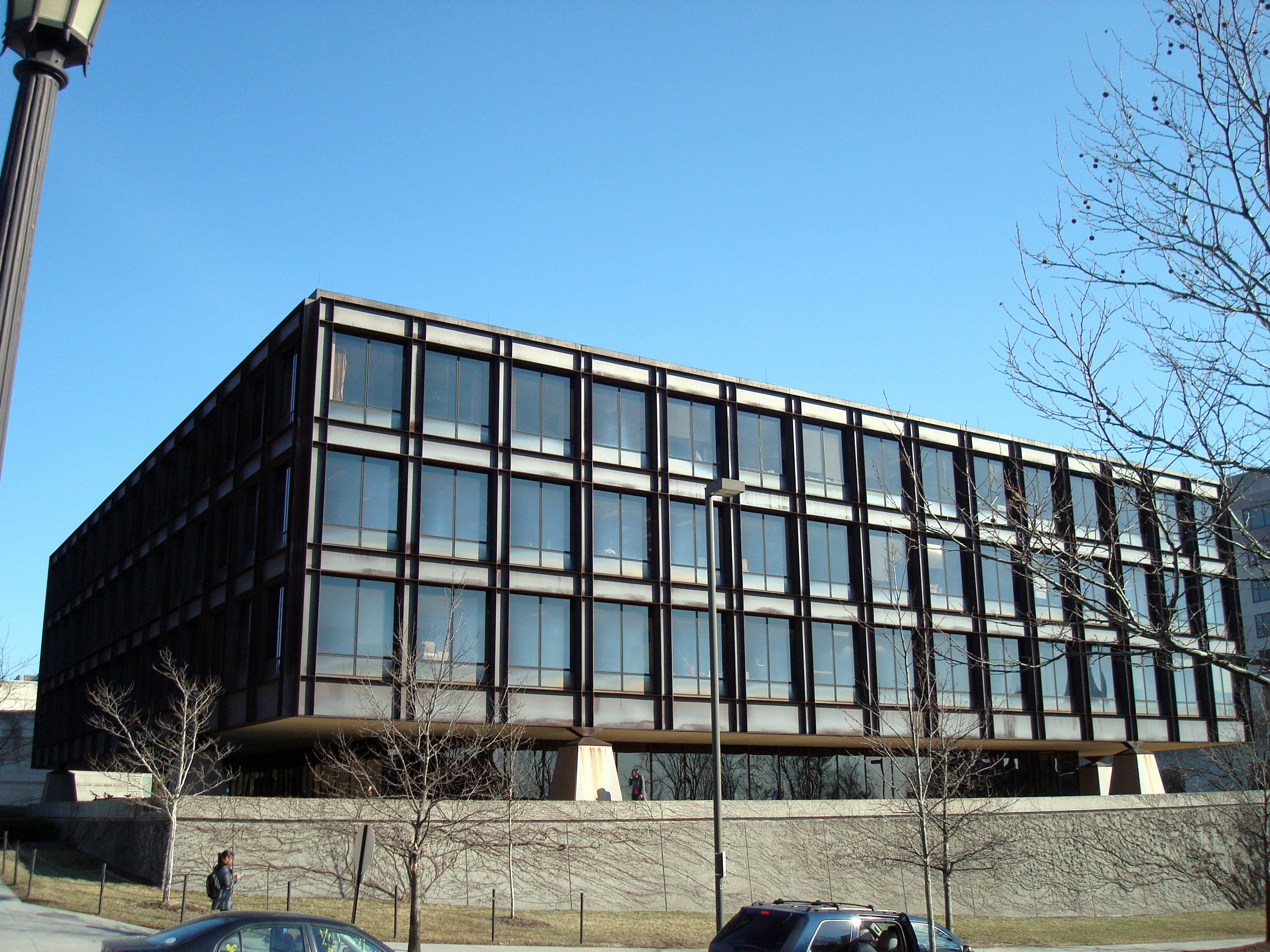
The Wilder Brain Collection is held in the Psychology Department at Uris Hall at Cornell University, Ithaca NY

The Wilder Brain Collection is a collection of human brains maintained by the Cornell University Department of Psychology. The collection was created by professor of anatomy, Burt Green Wilder. He was a member of the American Anthropometric Society, but quit in 1891 due to their restrictions that all brains be stored in Philadelphia. Wilder founded the Cornell Brain Society in 1889 to collect the brains of "educated and orderly persons". He believed that much could be learned about psychology from studying the anatomy of the brain. At its height, the collection reportedly contained over 600 and even as many as 1,200 brains and parts of brains. By the 1970s, the collection had been neglected and enthusiasm for brain collecting had dimmed. As a result, the university culled the collection to 122 specimens.

Part of the collection is on display in Uris Hall on the Cornell campus. Brains on display include those of several notable individuals:

- Helen Hamilton Gardener, a suffragist who intended to prove the equality of the sexes through her contribution
- Edward H. Rulloff, a philologist and murderer who possessed one of the largest recorded brains
- Edward B. Titchener, a 19th and 20th century psychologist
- Henry Augustus Ward, naturalist
- Simon Henry Gage, naturalist, histologist, and microscopist
- Burt Green Wilder, Cornell professor of psychology and founder of the brain collection. Wilder also served as a surgeon with the 55th Massachusetts Regiment during the American Civil War.
- Sutherland Simpson, Cornell professor of physiology

The collection also includes a piece of a pumpkin that was placed on the spire of McGraw Tower in 1997.
