= Bradley & Rulofson =

American photo studio

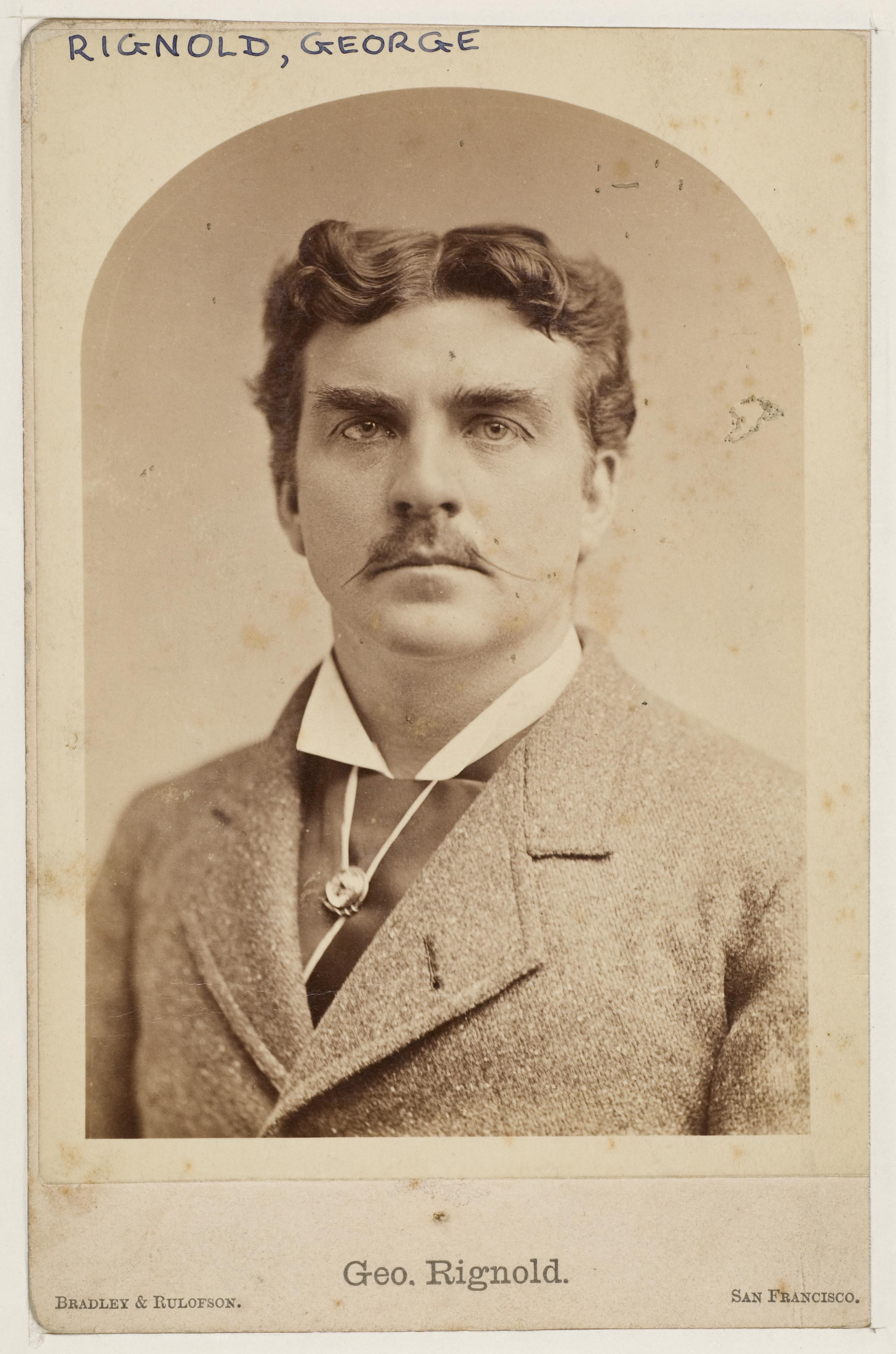
George Rignold

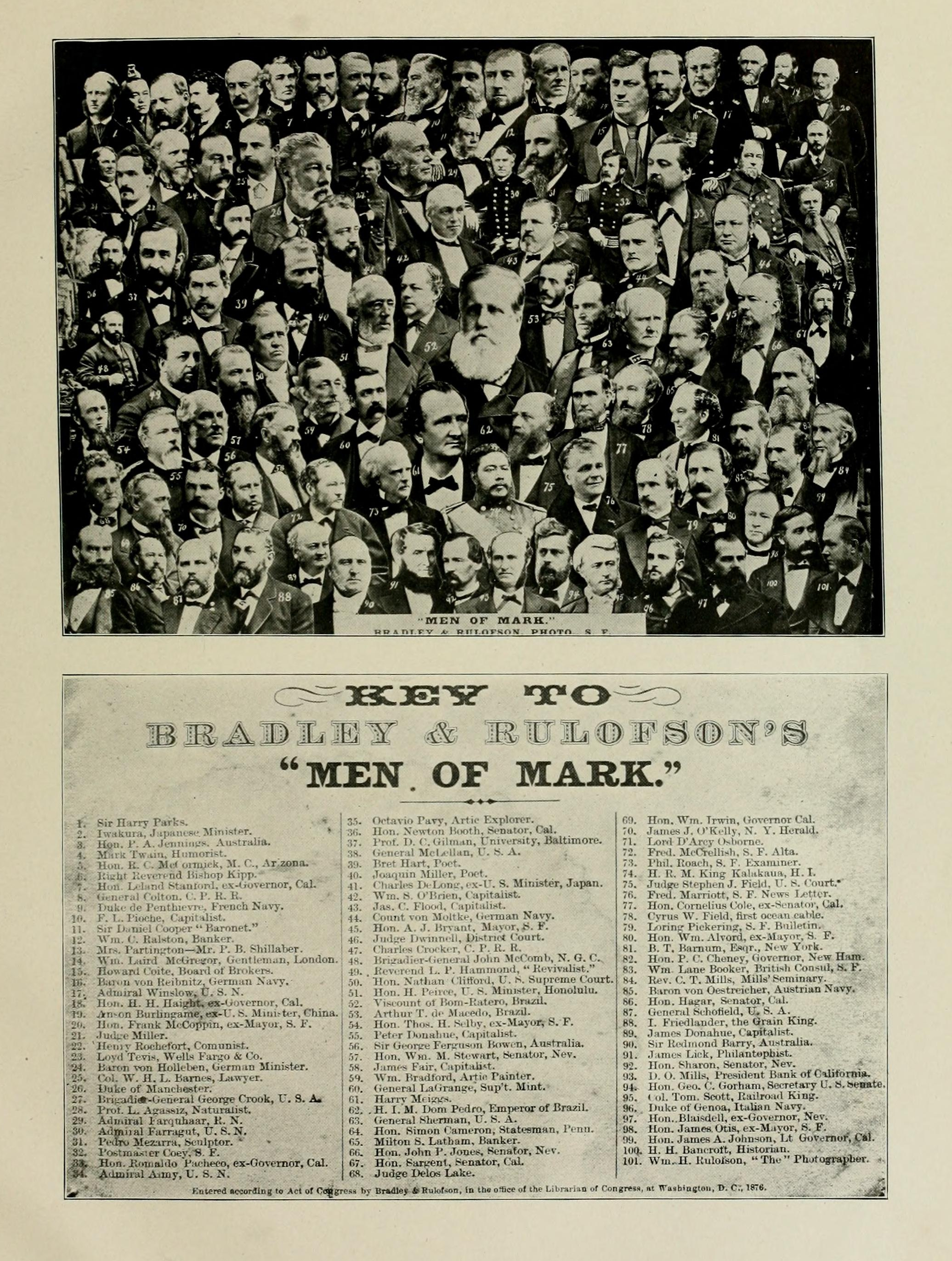

Bradley & Rulofson was a photo studio c. 1850–1878 in San Francisco with Henry William Bradley (1813–1891) and William Herman Rulofson. Their studio was at 429 Montgomery Street. The California Historical Society - North Baker Research Library has a collection of their work. They made portraits and cabinet cards. Their work is in various collections.

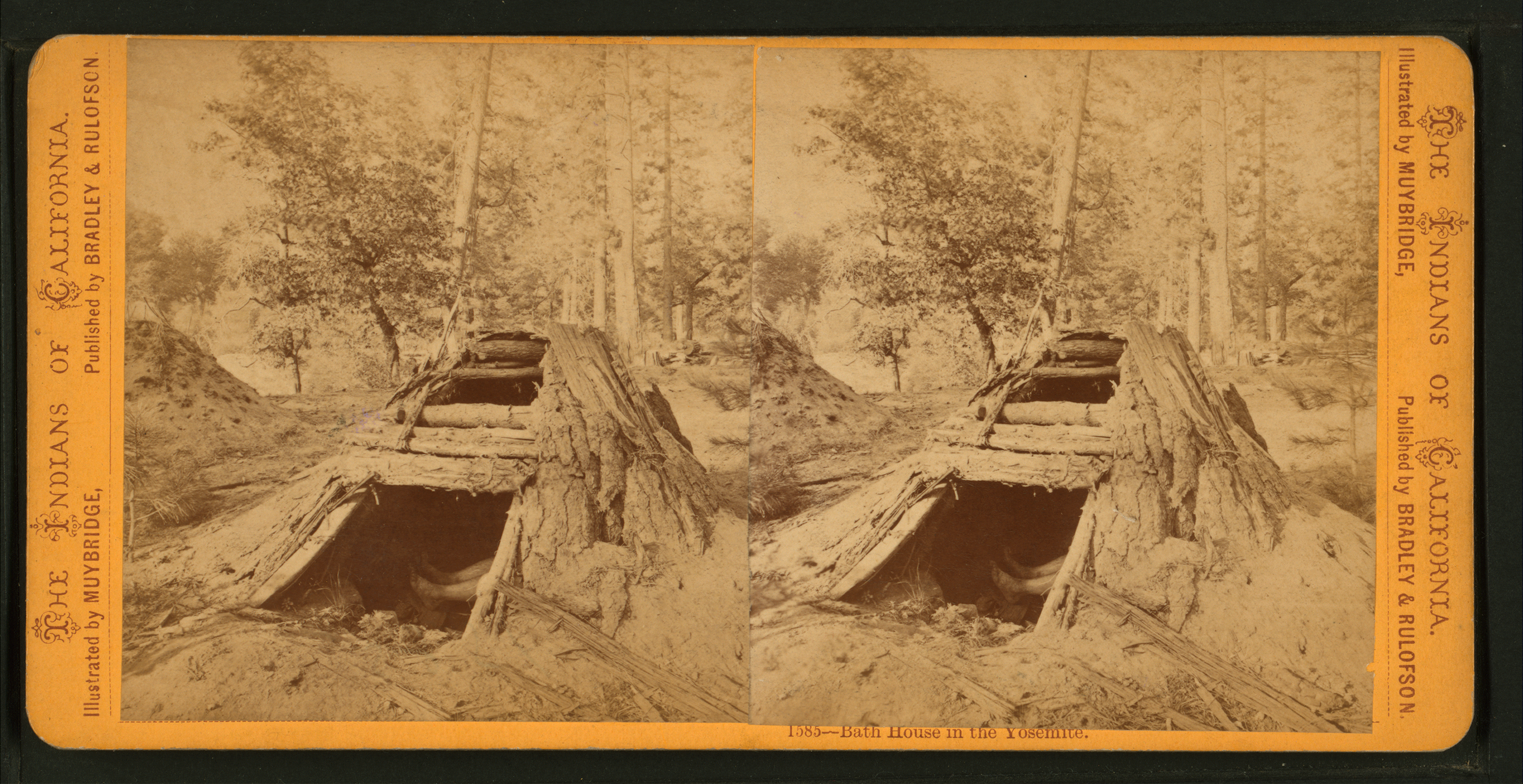
"Bath House in the Yosemite" from the Indians of California stereoscopic set published by Bradley & Rulofson (photo by Eadweard Muybridge)

The National Portrait Gallery has their photo of Henry W. Edwards.

Sheet music for The "Elite Race Gallop" by W. Stuckenholz was dedicated to them.

Bradley was from North Carolina and Rulofson from Canada.
