= Morrisville Public Library =

- U.S. National Register of Historic Places
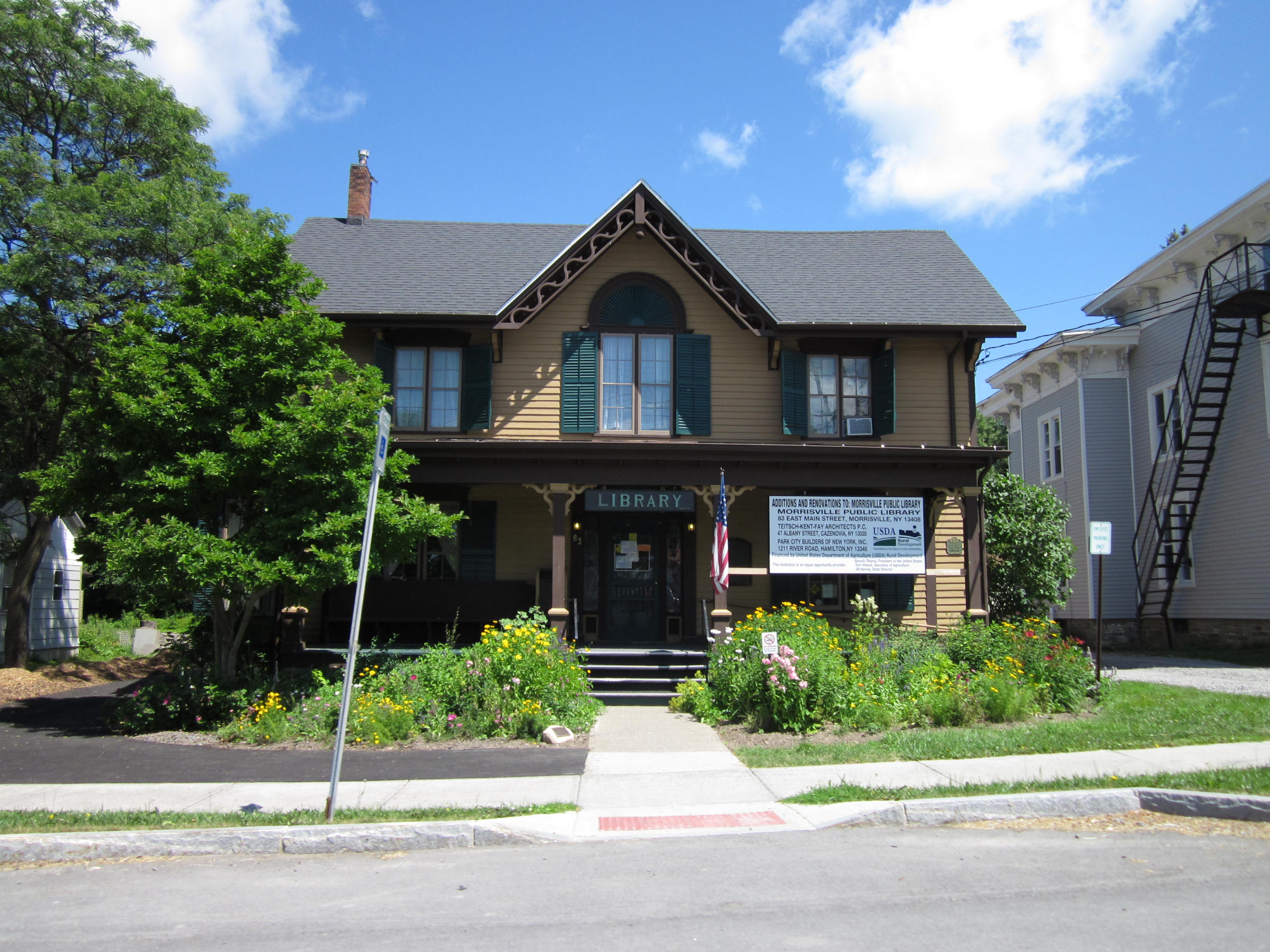
- Morrisville Public Library, July 2011

- Location within New York Location within the United States
- Location: 87 East Main St., Morrisville, New York
- Coordinates: 42°53′56″N 75°38′35″W
- Area: less than one acre
- Built: 1850
- Architectural style: Gothic Revival
- NRHP reference No.: 05001126
- Added to NRHP: October 5, 2005

Morrisville Public Library is a historic library building located at Morrisville in Madison County, New York. It was built about 1850 and is a 2 1/2-story frame picturesque cottage with Gothic Revival–style detailing. It became a library in December 1903 with 760 volumes on its shelves. It was given by Susanna Phelps Gage who wanted to give her family home to the village for something meaningful when her parents Henry and Mary Phelps died.

It was added to the National Register of Historic Places in 2005.
