= Michelle Coach =

9th President of the State University of New York at Morrisville
- Incumbent
- Assumed office August 19, 2026
- Preceded by: David Rogers

Personal details
- Education: Westfield State University; University of Massachusetts Amherst; University of Saint Joseph (Connecticut); Northcentral University
- Occupation: Academic administrator

Michelle Coach is a U.S. academic administrator serving as the ninth president of State University of New York at Morrisville since 2026.

== Life ==
Coach earned a B.S. in biology with elementary education certification from Westfield State University. She completed a M.B.A. at University of Massachusetts Amherst and a M.S. in biology from University of Saint Joseph, Connecticut. She earned a Ed.D. in leadership in higher education from Northcentral University.

Coach worked in various roles at Connecticut State Community College Asnuntuck including as interim dean of academic affairs, department chair, science coordinator, and campus chief executive officer. She was later dean of the School of Science, Technology, Engineering, and Mathematics at Connecticut State Community College.

On August 19, 2026, she became the ninth president of State University of New York at Morrisville. She succeeded David Rogers.
