= William Rutherford (physiologist) =

Scottish physician and physiologist

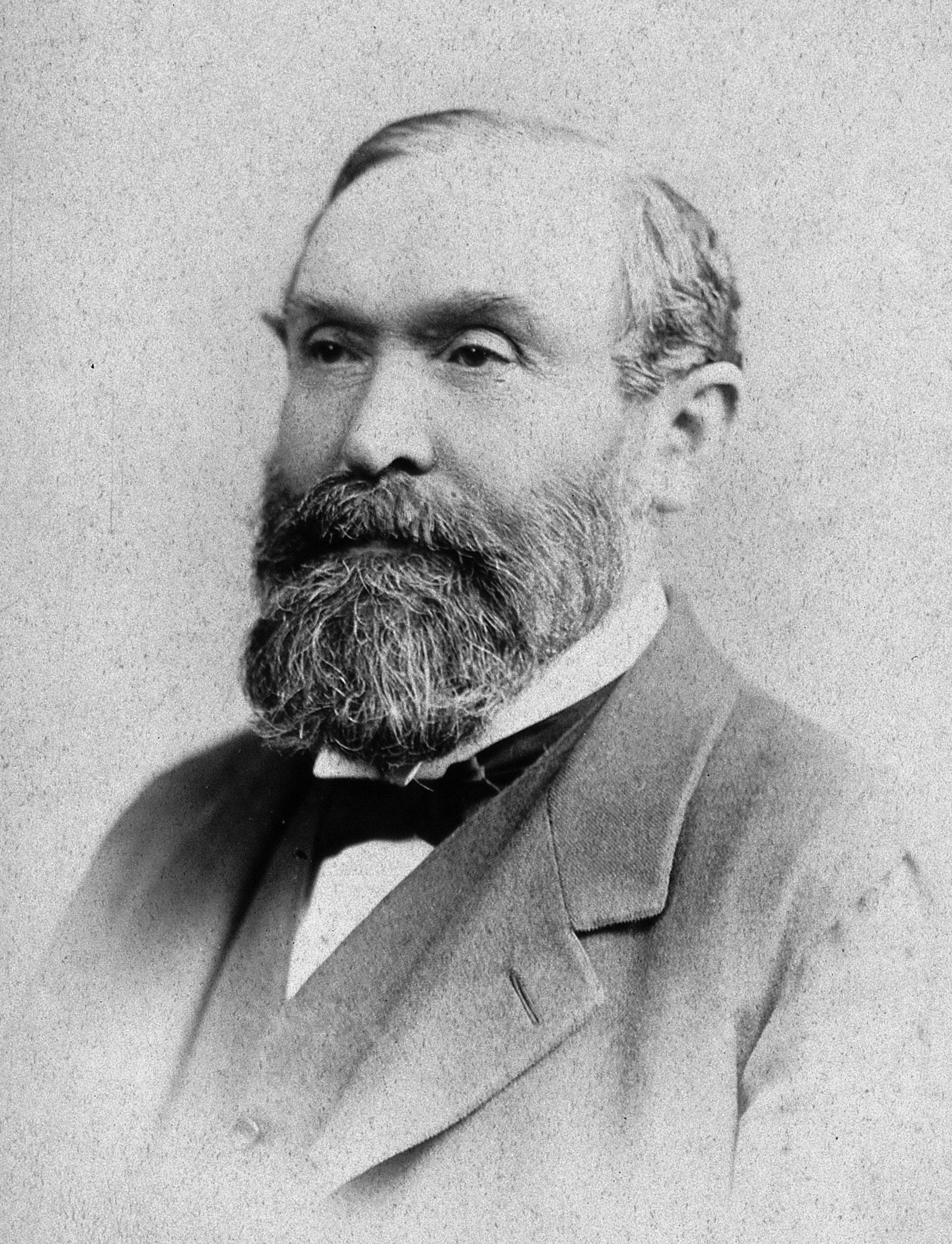
William Rutherford

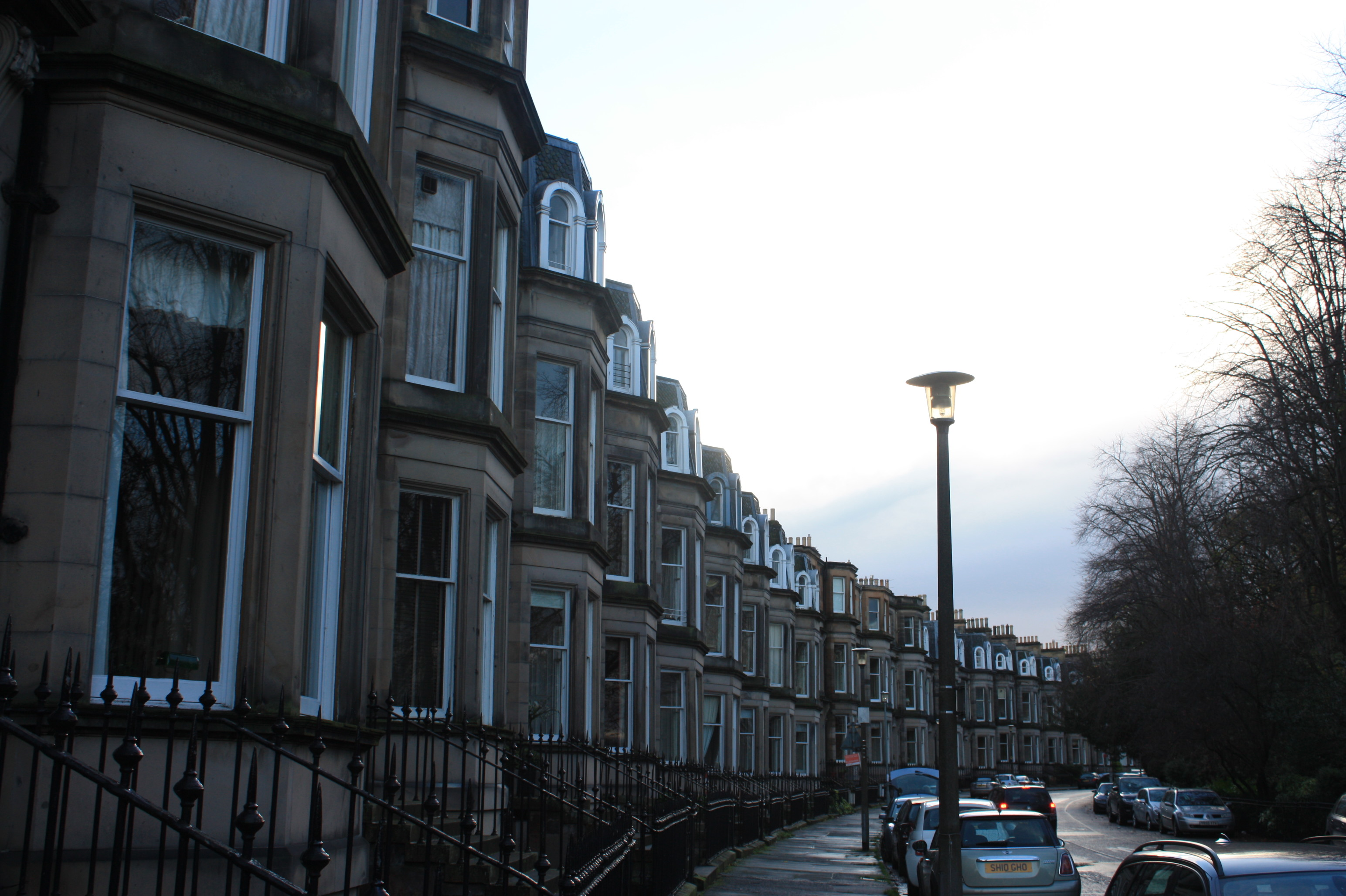
Douglas Crescent, Edinburgh

William Rutherford FRSE FRS FRCPE (20 April 1839, Ancrum Craig, Roxburghshire – 21 February 1899, 14 Douglas Crescent, Edinburgh) was a Scottish physician and physiologist. For 25 years he was professor of physiology at the University of Edinburgh, and contributed to the development of experimental physiology. He was Fullerian Professor of Physiology and Comparative Anatomy from 1872 to 1875.

== Life ==
Rutherford was born at Ancrum Craig Farm near Ancrum in Roxburghshire, the son of Elizabeth (née Bunyan) and Thomas Rutherford, a farmer and landowner. He was educated at Jedburgh Grammar School then studied medicine at the University of Edinburgh, gaining his doctorate (MD) in 1863.

After studying in Berlin, Vienna, and Paris, he became assistant to John Hughes Bennett, professor of physiology at the University of Edinburgh. After the Edinburgh anatomist John Goodsir told Bennett about the new experimental physiology in Germany, William Rutherford and the ophthalmologist Douglas Argyll Robertson became the first in the United Kingdom to instruct students in the use of the apparatus of Hermann von Helmholtz, Emil du Bois-Reymond and Carl Ludwig.

In 1869 he was elected a fellow of the Royal Society of Edinburgh, his proposer being John Hughes Bennett.

In 1869 Rutherford became assistant professor of physiology at King's College, London. In 1871 he was appointed professor of physiology at the Royal Institution. In 1874 he returned to the University of Edinburgh to succeed Bennett as professor of physiology. In 1875 he was elected a member of the Harveian Society of Edinburgh and in 1878 was elected a member of the Aesculapian Club.

Rutherford lectured at the University of Edinburgh when Arthur Conan Doyle studied medicine there. Like his fictional character Sherlock Holmes, who was based on a real person, Conan Doyle's Professor Challenger was based in part on Rutherford. From 1881 his laboratory assistant was Sutherland Simpson.

He died 21 February 1899 at 14 Douglas Crescent, Edinburgh. He was not married and had no children, so he was buried with his parents in Ancrum parish churchyard.

His chair at the University was filled by Prof Edward Albert Sharpey-Schafer.

== Works ==
- On the morbid appearances met with in the brains of thirty insane persons, 1869
- Influence of the vagus upon the vascular system, 1869
- Introductory lecture to the course of physiology in King's College, London, 1869, 1869
- An introduction to the study of medicine : a lecture delivered at the opening of the medical session of 1871–72, in King's College, London, 1871
- The present aspects of physiology; an introductory lecture, 1874
- Outlines of practical histology : being the notes of the Histological Section of the Class of Practical Physiology held in the University of Edinburgh, 1875
- The sense of hearing: a lecture, 1886
- Syllabus of lectures on physiology, 1887
- A General account of histological methods, 1887
- On the conditions that influence the attainment of the physiological ideal : introductory lecture, 14 October 1890, 1890
- The tercentenary of the compound microscope; an inaugural address delivered 7 November 1890, to the Scottish Microscopical Society, 1891
- On the method of studying a natural science such as physiology : an introductory lecture, delivered 9 October 1894, 1894

== Notes ==
Academic offices
Preceded by Michael Foster	Fullerian Professor of Physiology; 1872–1875	Succeeded by Alfred Henry Garrod
