= First National Bank of Morrisville =

Historic commercial building in New York, United States

- U.S. National Register of Historic Places
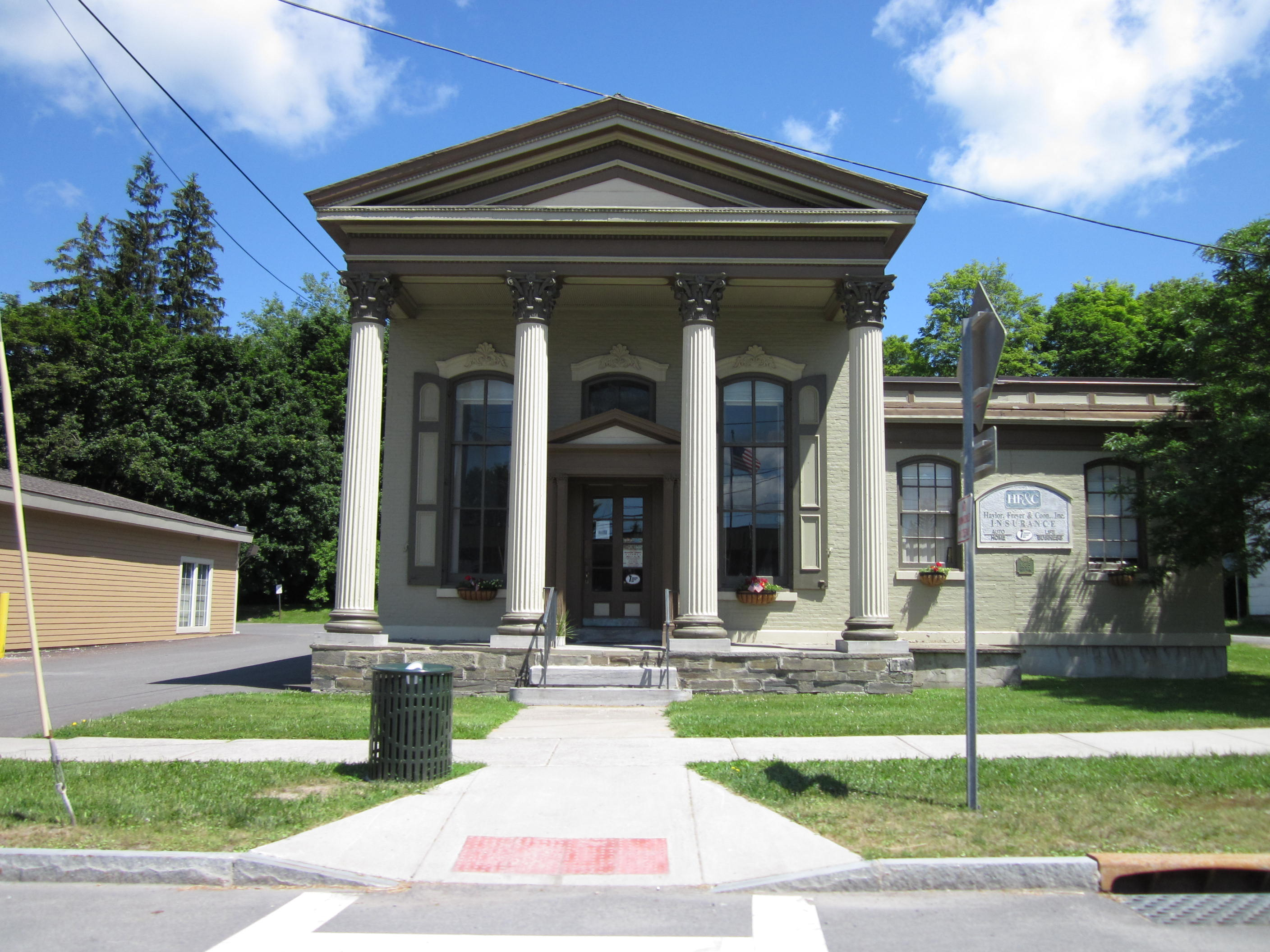
- First National Bank of Morrisville, July 2011

- Location within New York Location within the United States
- Location: Main St., Morrisville, New York
- Coordinates: 42°53′56″N 75°38′37″W
- Area: less than one acre
- Built: 1864
- Architectural style: Roman Classical
- NRHP reference No.: 85002365
- Added to NRHP: September 12, 1985

First National Bank of Morrisville, also known as First Trust & Deposit Co. or Key Bank, is a historic bank building located at Morrisville in Madison County, New York. It was built in 1864 and expanded in the 1890s, 1920s, and 1950s. It is a single-story brick building that features a finely detailed tetrastyle, Corinthian order portico.

It was added to the National Register of Historic Places in 1985.
