= H. W. Bradley =

American photographer (1813–1891)

Henry William Bradley (1813–1891) was an American photographer. He and his partner, William Rulofson, were active in San Francisco, California and were responsible for photographs of many notable Californians.

Bradley was born in Wilmington, North Carolina and spent his youth in New Orleans, Louisiana. He opened his San Francisco studio in February 1850, taking on Rulofson as a partner in 1863. The firm of Bradley & Rulofson was recognized as the leading photographic establishment on the West Coast, winning first prize at the Centennial Exposition at Philadelphia in 1876.

Bradley retired from his business in 1878. He died in his home in Alameda in 1891.
