= William Rulofson =

Canadian-American photographer

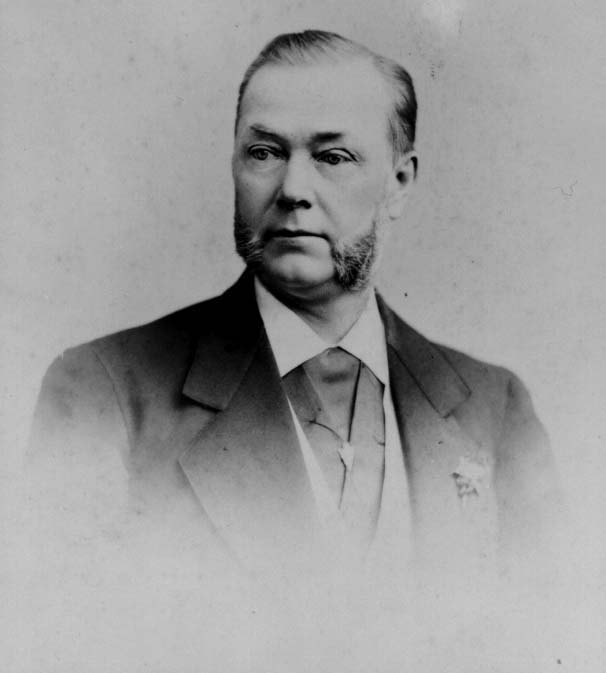
- Born: September 27, 1826; Hampton, New Brunswick
- Died: November 2, 1878 (aged 52); San Francisco, California, U.S.
- Known for: Photography
- Spouse: Amelia
- Elected: President - National Photographic Association; Official Photographer - Bohemian Club

William Herman Rulofson (September 27, 1826 – November 2, 1878) was a Canadian-American photographer, who along with his partner, H. W. Bradley, was considered one of the leading photographers in the city of San Francisco, California. He was also the brother of Edward H. Rulloff, a notorious murderer who was hanged for his crime in 1871.

== Early life ==
Rulofson was the youngest of six brothers in Hampton, New Brunswick, Canada, three of whom survived past childhood. His father, also named William Herman, died while Rulofson was still an infant, and his mother, Priscilla Amelia Howard, was the granddaughter of Hannah Lightfoot, who was alleged to have been the first wife of King George III. The Rulofson family had emigrated from Denmark to New York in the early 18th century. Loyalists during the American Revolution, they relocated to New Brunswick in 1781. As a teenager, Rulofson learned how to take daguerreotypes as an apprentice to a relative who was one of the earliest daguerreotypists in Saint John.

By 1846, he was traveling across North America and Europe to gain additional training in his craft. During this period, he was a passenger on SS Great Britain when it was shipwrecked off the coast of Northern Ireland. He was able to use his skills to earn enough money to return home, where he married Amelia Violet Currie. Their first son William Howard was born in 1848. Later that year, he left his family and came to California during the Gold Rush, arriving in San Francisco in June 1849. In 1850, he journeyed back across the U.S. to Missouri to meet his wife and son, who had been making their way west. The reunited family then returned to Sonora.

== Career ==
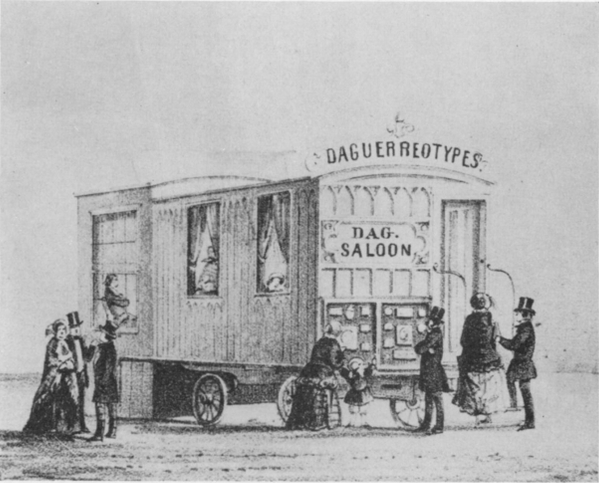
Mobile daguerreotype studio of William Rulofson and John Cameron

In Sonora, Rulofson established the first permanent photograph gallery in the state and plied his trade with a traveling daguerreotype wagon with partner John B. Cameron, taking portraits of miners. His work was highly regarded, with newspaper articles praising his skill. The mobile nature of his studio proved to be very useful, for at one time, the city of Sonora was destroyed by fire, but he and Cameron simply yoked a team of oxen to pull it to safety. In 1857, he bought out Cameron to become the sole proprietor of his business, which was destroyed in another fire in 1860. However, he had been successful enough to be able to afford to rebuild it.

In 1863, Rulofson moved to San Francisco and joined Bradley's studio, (Note: He sold the Sonora studio in 1865 and under various owners, it remained in business until 1942.) which soon became very well-respected. In addition to being technically proficient, Rulofson had a knack for business, growing the studio with plenty of advertising, as well as supplying prints to newspapers in exchange for bylines. The pair were responsible for numerous portraits of leading Californians and also were noted for publishing the works of Eadweard Muybridge. He even testified on Muybridge's behalf when the latter was on trial for the murder of his wife's lover (he was acquitted, the act having been ruled as justifiable homicide).

Rulofson's photographic talent was renowned. In 1873, he won gold prize at a competition in Vienna, and he was also elected president of the National Photographic Association in 1874. He was also a founding member as well as the official photographer of the Bohemian Club. On one occasion, when taking official photographs of the fortress Alcatraz Island for the Department of War, he was arrested as a Confederate spy but was released.

Rulofson also gained notoriety for his role in the publication of the satirical The Dance of Death. Written by Ambrose Bierce with Rulofson's son-in-law [mThomas A. Harcourt and released under the pseudonym "William Herman", the book describes the "intolerable nastiness" of the waltz. A man engaged in the dance is described: "his eyes, gleaming with a fierce intolerable lust, gloat satyr-like over [his partner]." Bierce later said, "Rulofson ... suggested the scheme and supplied the sinews of sin." Rulofson himself said of the book, "I have shown society what a loathsome ulcer festers in its midst."

== Personal life ==
Over the years, Rulofson and his wife had five children. After Amelia's death in 1867, Rulofson married Mary Jane Morgan, who was 18 years younger than him and who had been working as a secretary in the photography studio. They also had five children together. Morgan apparently had an eye for the art and was influential in many of his works, although she was never credited as photographer. After Rulofson's death, Morgan took control of his share of the studio, remaining in charge until 1889.

Rulofson was rumored to have a vicious temper. He became estranged from his second son, who went to sea after Amelia's death "to escape the severity of his father's punishment". Upon his return at age 19, father and son agreed that the boy would be adopted by the ship's captain. The children from his first marriage did not appear to take well to his second marriage, as Morgan was of their generation. During one dispute, the youngest daughter of his first marriage died, apparently killed by her half-brother Charles.

William Rulofson died on November 2, 1878, after falling from the roof of the Bradley & Rulofson studio in San Francisco. According to a report by The New York Times, he was heard to have exclaimed, "I am killed" during the descent.
