= Morrisville, New York =

- Village
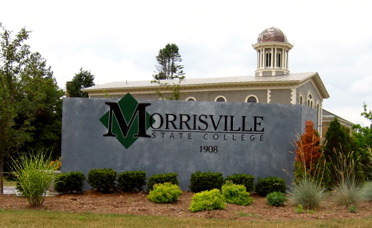
- Sign for Morrisville State College in the village

- Location within New York Location within the United States
- Coordinates: 42°53′55″N 75°38′52″W
- Country: United States
- State: New York
- County: Madison
- Town: Eaton

Area
  - Total: 1.02 sq mi (2.65 km^{2})
  - Land: 1.02 sq mi (2.65 km^{2})
  - Water: 0 sq mi (0.00 km^{2})
- Elevation: 1,348 ft (411 m)

Population (2020)
  - Total: 1,633
  - Density: 1,594.4/sq mi (615.61/km^{2})
- Time zone: UTC-5 (Eastern (EST))
  - Summer (DST): UTC-4 (EDT)
- ZIP code: 13408
- Area code: 315
- FIPS code: 36-48593
- GNIS feature ID: 0957706
- Website: www.morrisvilleny.com

Morrisville is a village in Madison County, New York, United States. The population was 1,633 at the 2020 census, down from 2,199 in 2010. The village is named after its founder, Thomas Morris.

Morrisville is in the northwest part of the town of Eaton on US Route 20. Its ZIP Code is 13408. State University of New York at Morrisville is located in the village.

== History ==
The community was named for Thomas Morris and was originally called "Morris Flats". It was made the county seat in 1817 when it was moved from Cazenovia. In 1907 the county seat was moved again, this time to Wampsville. In 1908, the New York State School of Agriculture was established and occupied the old county buildings that had been left empty.

The First National Bank of Morrisville, Morrisville Public Library, and Old Madison County Courthouse are listed on the National Register of Historic Places.

== Geography ==
Morrisville is located in central Madison County at 42°53′55″N 75°38′52″W (42.898541, -75.647717). U.S. Route 20 passes through the village as Main Street, leading east 7 miles (11 km) to Madison and west 11 miles (18 km) to Cazenovia. The closest city is Oneida, 15 miles (24 km) to the north.

According to the U.S. Census Bureau, the village of Morrisville has an area of 1.02 square miles (2.64 km^{2}), all land. The Chenango River rises in Morrisville Swamp just to the northwest of the village, and the nascent river crosses the southwest part of the village limits. The Chenango is a south-flowing tributary of the Susquehanna River, which it joins at Binghamton.

=== Climate ===
Climate data for Morrisville 6 SW, New York, 1991–2020 normals, 1911–2020 extremes: 1681ft (512m)
Month	Jan	Feb	Mar	Apr	May	Jun	Jul	Aug	Sep	Oct	Nov	Dec	Year
Record high °F (°C)	69 (21)	68 (20)	82 (28)	87 (31)	90 (32)	96 (36)	100 (38)	97 (36)	95 (35)	86 (30)	78 (26)	65 (18)	100 (38)
Mean maximum °F (°C)	50.6 (10.3)	50.4 (10.2)	60.5 (15.8)	76.0 (24.4)	82.4 (28.0)	85.1 (29.5)	86.3 (30.2)	85.6 (29.8)	82.8 (28.2)	74.6 (23.7)	64.5 (18.1)	54.6 (12.6)	85.6 (29.8)
Mean daily maximum °F (°C)	27.6 (−2.4)	30.2 (−1.0)	38.2 (3.4)	51.8 (11.0)	64.4 (18.0)	72.6 (22.6)	77.2 (25.1)	75.9 (24.4)	69.2 (20.7)	56.0 (13.3)	44.4 (6.9)	33.1 (0.6)	53.4 (11.9)
Daily mean °F (°C)	19.4 (−7.0)	21.3 (−5.9)	28.9 (−1.7)	42.1 (5.6)	54.4 (12.4)	63.0 (17.2)	67.3 (19.6)	66.0 (18.9)	59.2 (15.1)	47.0 (8.3)	36.5 (2.5)	26.1 (−3.3)	44.3 (6.8)
Mean daily minimum °F (°C)	11.3 (−11.5)	12.4 (−10.9)	19.7 (−6.8)	32.4 (0.2)	44.4 (6.9)	53.3 (11.8)	57.4 (14.1)	56.2 (13.4)	49.2 (9.6)	38.0 (3.3)	28.6 (−1.9)	19.0 (−7.2)	35.2 (1.8)
Mean minimum °F (°C)	−8.3 (−22.4)	−6.9 (−21.6)	−1.0 (−18.3)	19.0 (−7.2)	30.3 (−0.9)	40.3 (4.6)	47.9 (8.8)	46.8 (8.2)	36.2 (2.3)	25.5 (−3.6)	14.2 (−9.9)	0.9 (−17.3)	−11.2 (−24.0)
Record low °F (°C)	−35 (−37)	−34 (−37)	−21 (−29)	−1 (−18)	20 (−7)	29 (−2)	33 (1)	31 (−1)	22 (−6)	4 (−16)	−12 (−24)	−37 (−38)	−37 (−38)
Average precipitation inches (mm)	3.51 (89)	3.22 (82)	3.55 (90)	3.89 (99)	4.06 (103)	4.62 (117)	4.36 (111)	4.26 (108)	4.26 (108)	4.51 (115)	4.05 (103)	3.85 (98)	48.14 (1,223)
Average snowfall inches (cm)	33.7 (86)	26.5 (67)	21.0 (53)	5.1 (13)	0.3 (0.76)	0.0 (0.0)	0.0 (0.0)	0.0 (0.0)	0.0 (0.0)	1.0 (2.5)	10.6 (27)	28.2 (72)	126.4 (321.26)
Source 1: NOAA (1981–2010 Snowfall)
Source 2: XMACIS2 (records & monthly max/mins)

== Demographics ==
Historical population
Census	Pop.	Note	%±
1870	570		—
1880	741		30.0%
1890	726		−2.0%
1900	624		−14.0%
1910	500		−19.9%
1920	497		−0.6%
1930	583		17.3%
1940	666		14.2%
1950	1,250		87.7%
1960	1,304		4.3%
1970	2,296		76.1%
1980	2,707		17.9%
1990	2,732		0.9%
2000	2,148		−21.4%
2010	2,199		2.4%
2020	1,633		−25.7%
U.S. Decennial Census

As of the census of 2000, there were 2,148 people, 362 households, and 195 families residing in the village. The population density was 1,863.4 inhabitants per square mile (719.5/km^{2}). There were 398 housing units at an average density of 345.3 per square mile (133.3/km^{2}). The racial makeup of the village was 79.93% White, 14.20% African American, 0.74% Native American, 2.23% Asian, 0.93% from other races, and 1.96% from two or more races. Hispanic or Latino of any race were 4.24% of the population.

There were 362 households, out of which 27.1% had children under the age of 18 living with them, 41.7% were married couples living together, 10.8% had a female householder with no husband present, and 45.9% were non-families. 32.0% of all households were made up of individuals, and 10.5% had someone living alone who was 65 years of age or older. The average household size was 2.29 and the average family size was 2.92.

In the village, the population was spread out, with 9.0% under the age of 18, 60.8% from 18 to 24, 11.4% from 25 to 44, 8.3% from 45 to 64, and 10.6% who were 65 years of age or older. The median age was 20 years. For every 100 females, there were 108.1 males. For every 100 females age 18 and over, there were 107.3 males.

The median income for a household in the village was $34,375, and the median income for a family was $50,536. Males had a median income of $29,028 versus $24,643 for females. The per capita income for the village was $8,983. About 9.0% of families and 19.7% of the population were below the poverty line, including 27.2% of those under age 18 and 0.8% of those age 65 or over.

== Education ==
The village is the location of SUNY Morrisville, which includes the Morrisville fish hatchery, and the Morrisville Equestrian Center.

== Popular culture ==
In the 1980s cartoon series The Real Ghostbusters, Morrisville was the hometown of Ray Stantz.
