= State University of New York at Morrisville =

Public college in New York, US

SUNY Morrisville
- Former name: List: New York State School of Agriculture at Morrisville (1908–1948); New York State Agricultural and Technical Institute at Morrisville (1948–1964); State University of New York Agricultural and Technical College at Morrisville (1964–1987); State University of New York College of Agriculture and Technology at Morrisville (1987–2008)
- Type: Public college
- Established: 1908; 118 years ago
- Parent institution: State University of New York
- President: Michelle Coach
- Students: 2,060 (fall 2025)
- Undergraduates: 2,042 (fall 2025)
- Postgraduates: 18 (fall 2025)
- Location: Morrisville, New York, United States
- Campus: 150 acres (0.61 km^{2})
- Colors: (Green and white)
- Mascot: Mustangs
- Website: morrisville.edu

State University of New York at Morrisville (formerly Morrisville State College) or SUNY Morrisville is a public college with two locations in New York, one in Morrisville and one in Norwich. It is part of the State University of New York system. It offers one master's degree, 21 bachelor's degrees, 34 associate degrees, and two certificate programs, and is accredited by the Middle States Commission on Higher Education.

SUNY Morrisville is located in Central New York, 32 miles (51 km) southeast of Syracuse in the village of Morrisville, New York. Morrisville is near the towns of Cazenovia, 11.5 miles (18.5 km) to the west, and Hamilton, 8.4 miles (13.5 km) to the east.

== History ==
The university was initially established in 1908 as the "New York State School of Agriculture at Morrisville".

== Research ==
Undergraduate demographics as of Fall 2023
Race and ethnicity	Total
White	52%
Black	29%
Hispanic	11%
Two or more races	3%
International student	2%
American Indian/Alaska Native	1%
Asian	1%
Unknown	1%
Economic diversity
Low-income (Note: The percentage of students who received an income-based federal Pell grant intended for low-income students.)	56%
Affluent (Note: The percentage of students who are a part of the American middle class at the bare minimum.)	44%

=== Industrial hemp ===
SUNY Morrisville was one of the first campuses to hold a license to grow industrial hemp for grain and fiber research applications. This research program is being led by Agronomy professor Dr. Gilbert Jenkins and Morrisville students. While Industrial Hemp is very responsive to nitrogen inputs in terms on increased grain production, at the same time, fiber quality may decrease with high N inputs. We are looking to develop a grain yield response curve for nitrogen fertilization, test a variety of fertilization timing options, and sources of N fertilizer to maximize grain production. Fiber quantity and quality will be measured to determine if it is possible to harvest high quality fiber from a dual purpose crop, or whether nitrogen recommendations are divergent for fiber and grain production purposes.

Recently the college announced the creation of a cannabis industry minor.

=== Seahorses ===
SUNY Morrisville Aquatic Science and Aquaculture Program houses a breeding colony of Hippocampus erectus, the lined seahorse, and is currently working on experiments that address larval seahorse health and the conservation of seahorses.

=== Biofuels ===
The New York State Senate awarded $4 million for the creation of the New York Center for Liquid Biofuels at SUNY Morrisville with a facility based in Cortland County. The grant for the center will help fund a biodiesel infrastructure in New York State through the construction of an oilseed crushing and biodiesel processing plant and extensive research in the use of biofuels and byproducts.

=== Weather station ===
A fully automated, self-contained weather station has been in operation at SUNY Morrisville since 2002. The weather station collects weather data which is used in support of various college projects, including alternative energy projects.

== Buildings ==
=== Morrisville campus ===
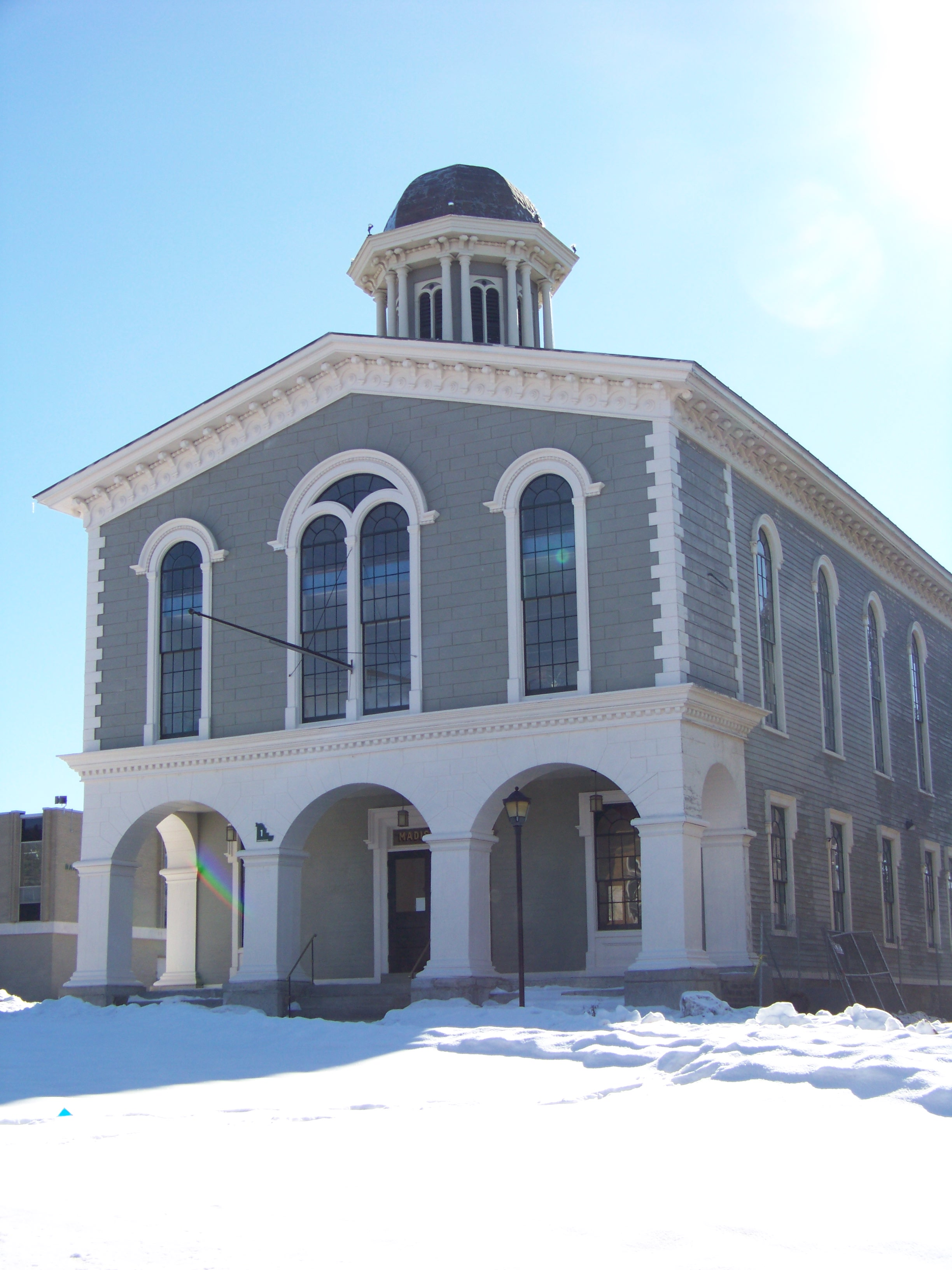
Madison Hall

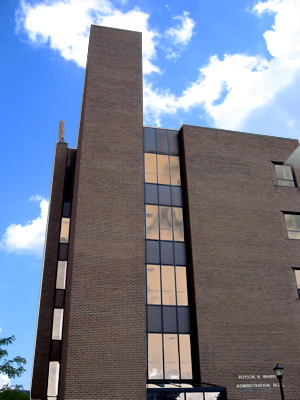
Whipple Tower

The Morrisville campus includes over 50 buildings spread across an area adjacent to US 20. The campus is in Morrisville, located in Central New York, about 30 miles (48 km) from both Syracuse and Utica. Morrisville is a small town, however a bus on a major route arrives and departs campus twice each day. The campus is situated on 150 acres (0.61 km^{2}) of land with more than 48 buildings, several athletic fields and 1,000 acres (4.0 km^{2}) of college-managed farm and woodland.

This includes eleven residence halls, split into four different locations:

- The "Iroquois Quad" includes Cayuga, Mohawk, Onondaga, and Oneida halls, and is located in the center of campus.
- The "Pond Quad" includes Helyar, Fountain View, Stewart, South, and West halls, and is located on the east side of campus. It is named for the Helyar Pond, which is overlooked by the dorms.
- East Hall, a quiet dorm that consists of small suites of rooms, is located in the northeast corner of the campus.
- The Morrisville Commons and Morrisville Commons II, suite-style dorms completed in 2006 and 2009 respectively, are on the far south end of campus. The Commons are owned by the Morrisville Auxiliary Corporation, rather than Morrisville State College itself.

The dorm halls are as follows:

- Cayuga Hall, a first year residence hall, featuring singles and doubles.
- Commons 1 and 2 are both apartment style living halls that supports up to 4 students in an apartment.
- East Hall, an upper classmen dorm hall featuring 24 hour quiet hours, as well as suite style single dorms.
- Fountain View Hall, (previously the Helyar-Stewart Dining Hall) is an upper classmen hall featuring singles, doubles, and triples as well as 24 hour quiet hours.
- Mohawk Hall, is a first year residence hall featuring doubles.
- Oneida Hall, is an upper classmen dorm hall featuring singles.
- Onondaga Hall is a first year residence hall featuring doubles.
- South Hall is a dorm hall that features singles only.
- Stewart Hall is currently shut down and not in use.
- West Hall is a first year dorm hall featuring doubles as well as singles for upperclassmen.

The academic buildings are spread out across the entire campus. They include:

- Bailey Hall, home to literature and assorted lecture classrooms.
- Bailey Annex, home to the Nursing Program
- Bicknell Hall, contains a taxidermy museum and classrooms for the Agriculture and Natural Resources Program.
- Brooks Hall, home to the Hospitality Programs, tour agency, University Police and the Madison County Tourism Office
- Donald G. Butcher Library is a multi-purpose building that provides a wide set of traditional and electronic library services and is home to a gallery space that features the work of students and local artists. Also included in the building are offices for the School of General Studies, the Academic Enrichment Center which provides tutoring services.
- Charlton Hall, which primarily houses the School of Business and Information Technology.
- Crawford Hall, containing most of the large lecture halls on campus and the School of Liberal Arts.
- Galbreath Hall, used mostly by the School of Science, Technology and Health Studies.
- Marshall Hall, home to the School of Agriculture.
- Sheila Johnson Welcome Center houses Admissions, Web Design, Marketing, Enrollment Management, and Institutional Advancement.
- Wood Technology Building, houses equipment for use in the Residential Construction program.

=== Norwich campus ===
A branch campus in Norwich, New York offers programs in business, technologies, liberal arts/education transfer, and nursing to Chenango area residents and employers.

== Athletics ==
Morrisville athletics wordmark

The SUNY Morrisville athletic teams are known as the "Morrisville Mustangs". The university is a member of the NCAA Division III ranks, primarily competing in the United East Conference (UEC; formerly known as the North Eastern Athletic Conference (NEAC) until after the 2020–21 school year) since the 2009–10 academic year; while its football team competes in the Empire 8; its women's ice hockey competes in the Northeast Women's Hockey League (NEWHL); and its field hockey and men's ice hockey teams compete in the State University of New York Athletic Conference (SUNYAC; which they previously competed as a full member from 2007–08 to 2008–09).

SUNY Morrisville competes in 17 intercollegiate varsity sports: Men's sports include basketball, cross country, football, ice hockey, lacrosse and soccer; while women's sports include basketball, cross country, field hockey, ice hockey, lacrosse, soccer, softball, track & field and volleyball; and co-ed sports include hunt seat and Western equestrian.

== Affiliates ==
=== Morrisville Auxiliary Corporation ===
The Morrisville Auxiliary Corporation is a non-profit corporation that provides dining and other services to the Morrisville campus and elsewhere. As a separate corporation, it is not bound by the same rules that the state imposes on the SUNY schools themselves, namely it is not bound by the same level of openness that public institutions are required to maintain.

=== SUNY Syracuse EOC ===
The Syracuse Educational Opportunity Center (SUNY Syracuse EOC) has been administered by SUNY Morrisville since 1973.

=== Horse drug testing ===
Since 2010, Morrisville has also been home to the laboratory that tests racehorses for illegal performance enhancing drugs.

== Notable alumni ==
- Oluwale Bamgbose, professional Mixed Martial Artist, formerly competing in the UFC's middleweight division
- Kai Cenat - Twitch Streamer
- Michele Anne Harris, woman whose 2001 disappearance led to her husband Cal being tried for her murder four times in ten years before being acquitted.
- Curtis Johnson - former NFL defensive end
- Jon Jones - mixed martial artist, the former Ultimate Fighting Championship Light Heavyweight Champion and Heavyweight Champion.
- Aljamain Sterling - two-time All-American wrestler; professional Mixed Martial Artist, former UFC Bantamweight Champion
- Wendall Williams - former Houston Texans wide receiver
