= American Microscopical Society =

The American Microscopical Society (AMS) is a society of biologists dedicated to promoting the use of microscopy.

A cohort of biologists and science educators, the AMS's members use a wide array of microscopical techniques including (light microscopy, electron microscopy, fluorescence and confocal microscopes) to further their research and eventually publish their research in its journal Invertebrate Biology.

Yearly meetings conducted by the AMS focus on innovation in current microscopy techniques. Workshops conducted by the AMS are focused not only on microscopy techniques themselves, but also on the organisms that current members are studying with these microscopy techniques.

== History ==
Founded in 1878 as an outgrowth of the first National Microscopical Congress, the first members of the AMS were biologists, medical doctors, and dentists interested in incorporating light microscopy into their clinical work. During this time period, the compound microscope was a new technology and the AMS was purposed with exploiting its possibilities in the fields of medicine and bacteriology.

=== Early leadership ===
Alpheus Baker Hervey was the chairman of the first congress. Trained as a marine biologist, his research focused on algae.

Dr. R.H. Ward, a medical doctor, was the first president of the AMS. His son, Henry B. Ward was an early twentieth-century biologist and later went on to serve as an AMS president.

Other leaders of AMS included

- Hamilton O. Smith, who was known for his work on marine algae
- Jacob D. Cox, a microscopical technologist who also served as the governor of Ohio
- Thomas Jonathan Burrill, a bacteriologist
- David S. Kellicott, a protozoologist

The collection of prominent scientists who belonged to the AMS also included: L.M. Vorce, Dr. George Edward Fell, E. and W. Bausch, G.E. Blackham, and C.A. Spencer.

Oliver Wendell Holmes Sr. was an early associate.

Simon Henry Gage, the author of a book on the microscope with 17 editions published between 1880 and 1943, served as the AMS president twice.

Charles A. Spencer and Robert B. Tolles, renowned microscope makers, were honored by the production of the Spencer-Tolles Memorial Fund, which continues to promote publications in the field of microscopical research.

=== Early meetings ===
Early AMS meetings functioned as social and scientific gatherings, and were heavily covered by the press. Public admission was encouraged by demonstrations on biological specimens that highlighted the importance of microscopes and microscopy to the general public.

== Publications ==
The AMS published one America's first scientific journals, Invertebrate Biology (1995–present), which has gone under the names Proceedings of the American Society of Microscopists (1880-1891), Proceedings of the American Microscopical Society(1892-1894), and Transactions of the American Microscopical Society (1895-1994).

At its inception, these publications welcomed research about the practical applications of microscopy on a range of biological fields including study of protozoa, algae, fungi, vascular plants, bacteria, invertebrates, and vertebrate histology and cytology.

However, as the publication shifted to focus on invertebrate biology, the name was changed from Transactions of the American Microscopical Society to Invertebrate Biology in order to better represent this shift.

The new publication continued Transactions from volume 114, and currently its content centers around all aspects of the biology of invertebrates–not only microscopy, but also research involving cellular and molecular biology, ecology, physiology, genetics, systematics, behavior, and biogeography.

The current research goals of Invertebrate Biology describes its research goals as spanning the fields of "morphology and ultrastructure, genetics and phylogenetics, evolution, physiology and ecology, neurobiology, behavior and biomechanics, reproduction and development" and includes "cell and molecular biology related to all types of invertebrates: protozoan and metazoan, aquatic and terrestrial, free-living and symbiotic".

The AMS guidelines specify that discussions of taxonomy as strictly complementary to these research goals, and should function as a secondary component.

== Symposiums and meetings ==
=== Student awards ===
The AMS awards a certificate and a monetary prize for the Best Contributed Paper, original research that is presented by a student at the AMS Annual Meeting.

Only students or graduates who have not received a degree more than 12 months before the meeting are eligible to compete for the awards.

=== Photomicrography contest ===
The AMS also awards the Ralph and Mildred Buchsbaum Prize for Excellence in Photomicrography in honor of Ralph Buchsbaum, American zoologist, ecologist, and invertebrate biologist, and his wife Mildred Buchsbaum, who first worked as his research assistant and later helped him in creating the first chimera between the green algae Chlorella and chick fibroblast cells.

- There are two categories: color and black-and-white photomicrographs.
- Only photomicrographs that taken with transmission electron microscopy, scanning electron microscopy, and any kind of light microscopy, including confocal scanning laser microscopy, are eligible.

== Funding and fellowships ==
=== Student research funding ===
The AMS Student Research Fellowship funds are offered to university students as financial assistance for summer research projects involving microscopy.

There are two fellowships of $1000 each that the AMS awards to students. Undergraduate and graduate proposals are assessed separately.

The guidelines apply to any undergraduate or graduate student who is a member of the AMS, with the exception of students who received this award in the past.

=== AMS student travel awards ===
AMS travel awards are funds of $250 for transportation to the annual AMS meetings, which are joint endeavors between the AMS and the Society for Integrative and Comparative Biology.

=== AMS microscopy training fellowships ===
The AMS microscopy training fellowship funds are for support of graduate students and faculty members at the beginning of their careers. The funds are for training in new microscopy techniques. There are two fellowships of $1000 each are available each year, and the training may be obtained either through public courses and workshops or through private courses taken at other institutions.

The guidelines apply to any graduate student or early career faculty member who is a full member of AMS, again with the exception of past fellowship recipients.

Applications from graduates students and faculty members are also assessed independently and awards are rewarded at a maximum of $1000.
