= Burt Green Wilder =

American anatomist. (1841–1925)

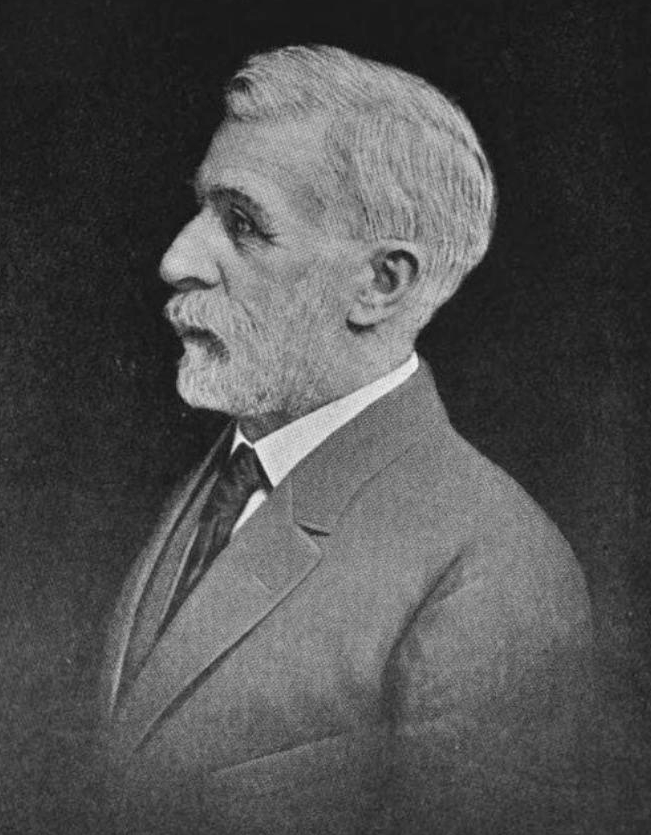
- Born: August 11, 1841; Boston, Massachusetts
- Died: January 21, 1925 (aged 83); Chestnut Hill, Massachusetts
- Education: Lawrence Scientific School
- Occupation(s): Physician, educator

Burt Green Wilder (August 11, 1841 – January 21, 1925) was an American comparative anatomist.

== Biography ==
Burton Green Wilder was born in Boston to David and Celia Colton Wilder. He graduated at Harvard (Lawrence Scientific School, 1862; medical department, 1866). During part of the Civil War he served as surgeon of the Fifty-fifth (Negro) Massachusetts Infantry. From 1867 to his retirement in 1910 he was professor of neurology and vertebrate zoölogy at Cornell.

He was elected as a member to the American Philosophical Society in 1878.

In 1885 he was president of the American Neurological Association and in 1898 of the Association of American Anatomists. He was a member of the American Anthropometric Society, but quit in 1891 due to their restrictions that all brains be stored in Philadelphia. While at Cornell, Wilder began what would become the Wilder Brain Collection. He died at his home in Chestnut Hill, Massachusetts on January 21, 1925. His own brain was removed from his corpse and added to the collection.

Notably, the earliest known instance of the term neuron was in 1884, when Wilder used the word to describe the cerebrospinal axis (also known as the Central Nervous System). The term was popularized, and given its more modern meaning, by Heinrich Waldeyer in 1891.

Among his writings are:

- What Young People Should Know (1874)
- Anatomical Technology (1882), with Gage
- Physiology Practicums (second edition, 1895)

A species of Brazilian snake, Liotyphlops wilderi, is named in his honor.
