= Effie Brown Earll Slingerland Yantis =

American artist and politician (1869–1950)

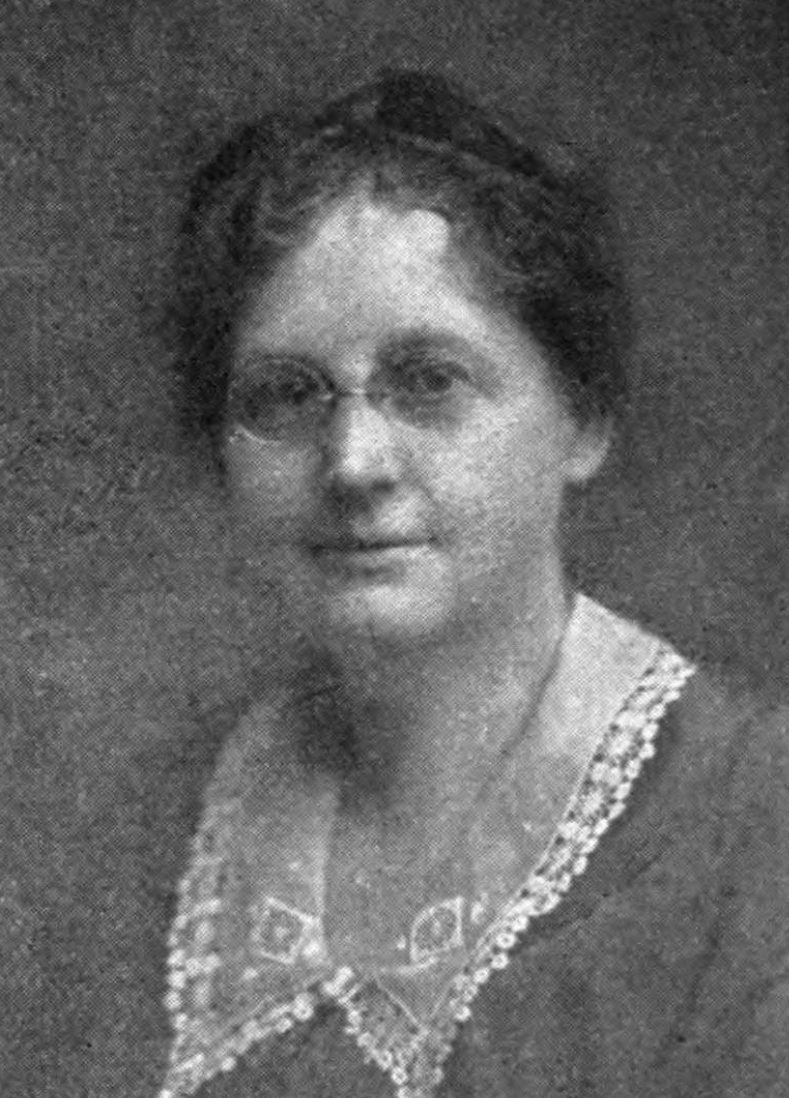

Member of the New Hampshire House of Representatives from the Hillsborough district
- In office 1922–1926

Personal details
- Born: Effie Brown Earll; June 28, 1869
- Died: April 17, 1950 (aged 80)
- Party: Republican
- Spouse: Rev. Arnold S. Yantis (m. 1912)
- Education: Cornell University
- Occupation: Illustrator, social worker, politician

Effie Brown Earll Slingerland Yantis (June 28, 1869 – April 17, 1950) was an American illustrator, colorist, lecturer, social worker, and politician. Between 1922 and 1926, she was also a member of the New Hampshire Legislature.

== Early life and education ==
Born in 1869 to John Murray and Julia Earll, Effie Yantis grew up in Skaneateles, New York. In 1889, at the age of 20, Yantis was admitted to Cornell University, a rarity for women in the late 19th century. Yantis participated in a number of clubs, including the Ithaca Woman's Club, the Campus Club of Cornell University, and the Cornell Woman's Club. Yantis also helped start the Home Economics program at Cornell with Professor Anna Botsford Comstock by persuading then-President Jacob Gould Schurman to consent to a trial course. At Cornell, Yantis met her first husband, Mark Vernon Slingerland, then an instructor of entomology who was also a cousin of Anna Comstock. She graduated from Cornell University in 1893.

== Early career, marriages and club memberships ==
In 1904, Yantis began producing lantern slides for nature studies. Lantern slides are transparent glass plate or film, typically hand-drawn, that are intended for projection using a "magic lantern". Yantis' so-called "Slingerland lantern slides" were used in nature studies and college agricultural departments across the United States and all over the world. The subjects of "Slingerland lantern slides" were often close-ups of fruits and vegetables or scenes of urban living.

After the death of her first husband, Yantis married Arnold S. Yantis, a Universalist clergyman, in 1912. Reverend Yantis practiced law for a short period of time in Washington before becoming a traveling minister. As Effie Yantis moved around the country with her husband, she became a member of a number of social and philanthropic clubs such as the Woman's Alliance and the Women's Educational and Industrial Union chapter in Auburn, New York. In 1915, the couple moved to Manchester, New Hampshire, in order for Yantis to become the pastor of a Universalist church.

== Civic and political roles ==
Upon moving to New Hampshire, Effie Yantis settled in quickly and began networking with her new community. The same year that she moved to New Hampshire, Yantis helped found the Homemaker's Club of Manchester, becoming its first president. Throughout the First World War, Yantis was a part of the Woman's Committee, the Council of National Defense, the State Speaker's Bureau, the Food Conservation Committee, the New Hampshire Sunday School Association, and the legislative, economic, and civic committees of the New Hampshire Federation of Woman's Clubs. Additionally, Yantis organized food committees and lectured for the War Work Council of the YWCA. Yantis also became Vice President of the State League of Woman's Voters and held the war pageant "Awakening of America".

In 1922, Effie Yantis ran for a position in the New Hampshire General Court as a Republican candidate representing Manchester. She introduced House Bill No. 118 to eliminate several underlying causes that served as justification for divorce within the state. Yantis was re-elected two years later, becoming the first woman ever to have been re-elected to the New Hampshire Legislature. In her second term, Yantis was appointed to the Labor and Agricultural College Committees. She supported the ratification of the Child Labor Amendment and the Sheppard-Towner Maternity and Infancy Law.

== Death ==
Yantis died on April 17, 1950, at the age of 80.
