= Mark Vernon Slingerland =

American entomologist (1864-1909)

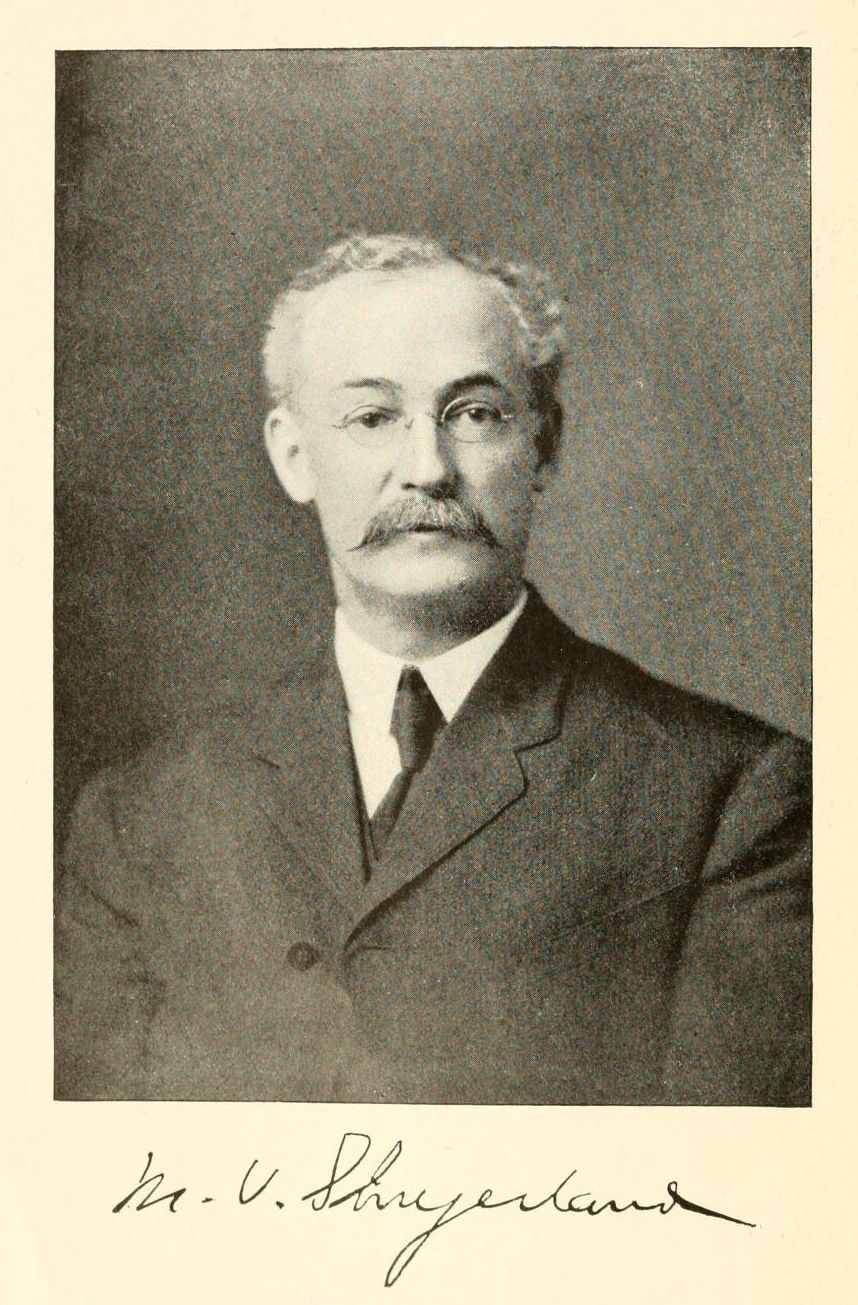
Mark Vernon Slingerland

Mark Vernon Slingerland (October 3, 1864 – March 11, 1909) was an American entomologist who worked at Cornell University. He was a pioneer of insect photography and made use of it as a tool for documenting insect biology.

== Life and work ==
Slingerland was born in Otto, Cattaraugus County. A cousin of Anna Comstock, he became a student at Cornell in 1888, graduating with a BS in agriculture in 1892. As a new student, he had little knowledge of entomology. He took entomology courses offered by Comstock's husband, J H Comstock, out of curiosity. He found the subject fascinating and rapidly gained knowledge. He became the first assistant to professor Comstock, and worked as an instructor in entomology from 1890, specializing in applied entomology. He established an insectary to breed insects of economic importance to study their life histories in order to find ways of managing and controlling their populations. He later took the undergraduate courses in economic entomology and managed studies at the Agricultural Experiment Station. He became an assistant professor in 1907. Slingerland was one of the early adopters of photography and used a large bellows camera to capture images of insects and their life histories. He published the photographs and made lantern slides for his lectures.

Slingerland married artist Effie Earll Murray in 1892 and they had a daughter. She made many of his lantern slides which were also sold to universities and schools as "Slingerland Lantern Slides". Slingerland died at the age of 45 from Bright's disease at his home on Summit Avenue. After his death, his widow married Rev. Arnold Stephens Yantis in 1912.
