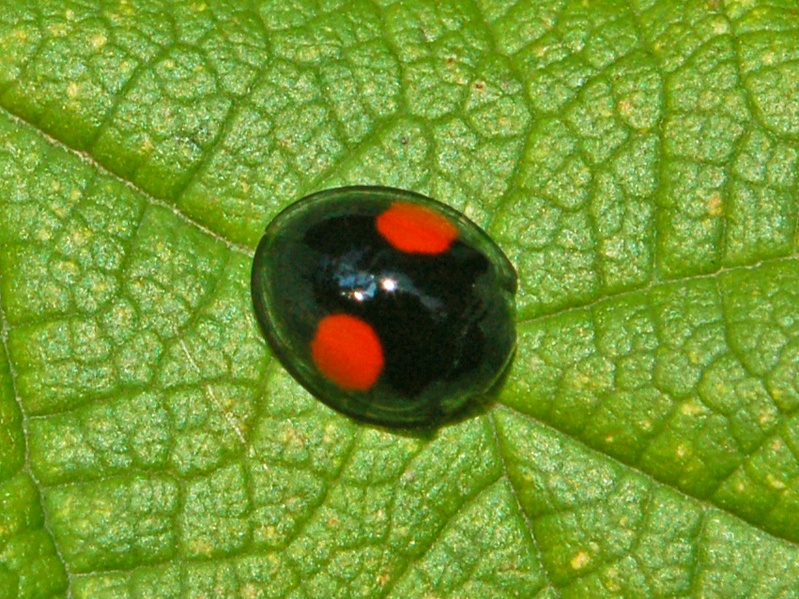

Scientific classification
- Kingdom: Animalia
- Phylum: Arthropoda
- Clade: Pancrustacea
- Class: Insecta
- Order: Coleoptera
- Suborder: Polyphaga
- Infraorder: Cucujiformia
- Family: Coccinellidae
- Genus: Chilocorus
- Species: C. similis

Binomial name
- Chilocorus similis (Rossi, 1790)

= Chilocorus similis =

Species of beetle

Chilocorus similis is a species of red-spotted lady beetles belonging to the family Coccinellidae, subfamily Chilocorinae.

This beetle is an endemic Italian species, present in Italian mainland. It preys on scale insects living on Euonymus species. The elytra are brown-black, with two reddish round spots. It measures about 3–5 millimetres (1/8–3/16 in) long. This lady beetle was deliberately introduced to the United States by Marlatt in 1902 to control the San Jose Scale, an early example of biocontrol.
