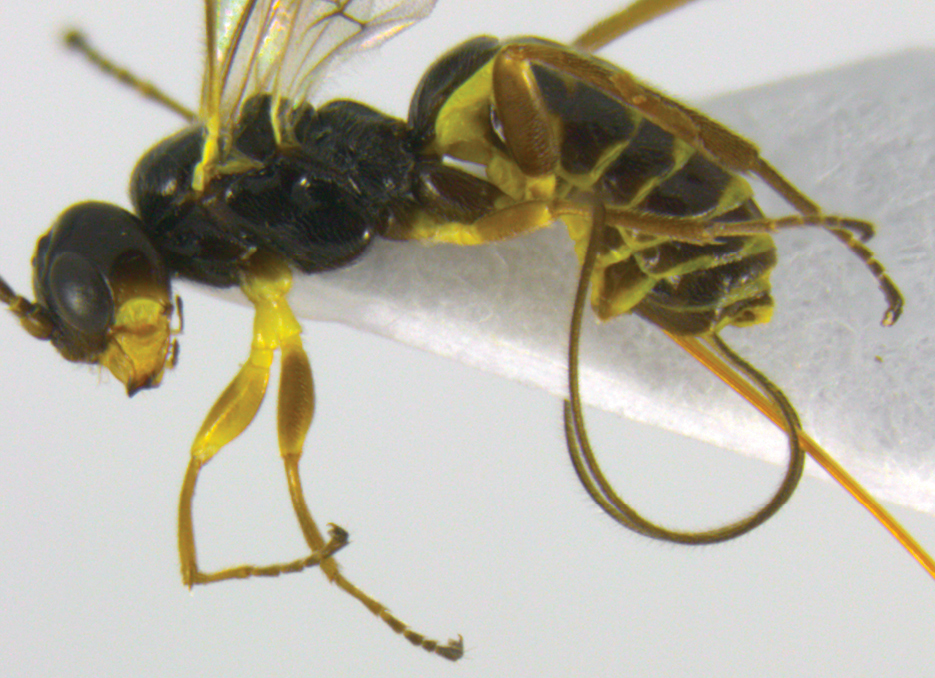
- Female holotype (antennae, wings, and ovipositor out of frame)

Scientific classification
- Domain: Eukaryota
- Kingdom: Animalia
- Phylum: Arthropoda
- Class: Insecta
- Order: Hymenoptera
- Family: Ichneumonidae
- Subfamily: Tryphoninae
- Tribe: Idiogrammatini
- Genus: Idiogramma
- Species: I. elbakyanae

Binomial name
- Idiogramma elbakyanae Khalaim in Khalaim & Ruíz-Cancino, 2017
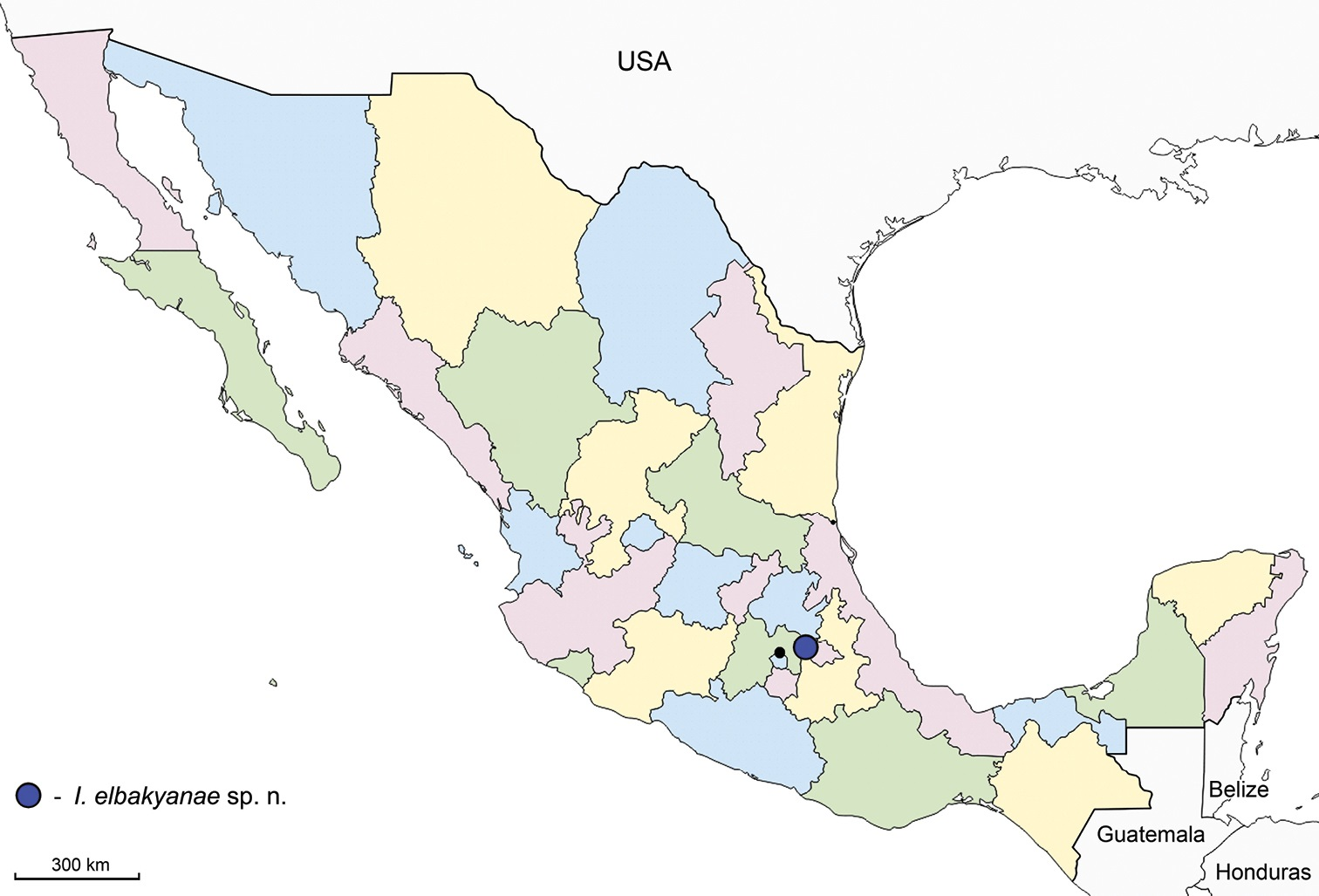
- Distribution map, showing location where I. elbakyanae were found (⬤)

= Idiogramma elbakyanae =

Species of wasp

Idiogramma elbakyanae is a species of parasitoid wasp found in the Mexican state of Tlaxcala. The species was named and described by the Russian entomologist Andrey I. Khalaim. The description was published in a 2017 open access article co-authored with Mexican entomologist Enrique Ruíz-Cancino.

== Etymology ==
Andrey I. Khalaim, an entomologist at the Russian Academy of Sciences, chose the specific name elbakyanae to honor Sci-Hub founder Alexandra Elbakyan "in recognition of her contribution to making scientific knowledge available for all researchers". Elbakyan took offense to being the namesake of a "parasitic insect"; this in part led to her temporary shutdown of Sci-Hub in Russia. In a message which appeared when Russians attempted to visit Sci-Hub, she said that it was an "extreme injustice" (Note: Elbakyan's original Russian text: "А недавно сотрудник Российской академии наук решил назвать в честь Александры паразитическое насекомое (речь идет о насекомых из семейства наездников-паразитов). Что я рассматриваю как крайнюю несправедливость: ведь если анализировать ситуацию с научными публикациями, то настоящими паразитами являются научные издательства, а Sci-Hub, наоборот, борется за равный доступ к научной информации и делает полезное дело.") to have the wasp named after her. Khalaim was surprised by her reaction, emphasizing he intended it to be an honor. He said he approves of Sci-Hub and regularly uses it himself. He also clarified that, as parasitoids kill their hosts, it should be more thought of as a predatory wasp, than a parasite.

== Taxonomic history ==
The type series comprised a female holotype and four male paratypes, all collected in 2016. The holotype and one paratype were deposited at National Autonomous University of Mexico; the other three paratypes were deposited at the Autonomous University of Tamaulipas, the Zoological Museum of the Zoological Institute of the Russian Academy of Sciences, and the Natural History Museum, London.

== Distribution ==
It is found in the central Mexican state of Tlaxcala. The type locality, where all specimens in the type series were found, is in Nanacamilpa de Mariano Arista. The specimens were all caught in forest of pine and oak trees; the collection site was at an elevation of 2,830–2,900 metres (9,280–9,510 ft).

== Description ==
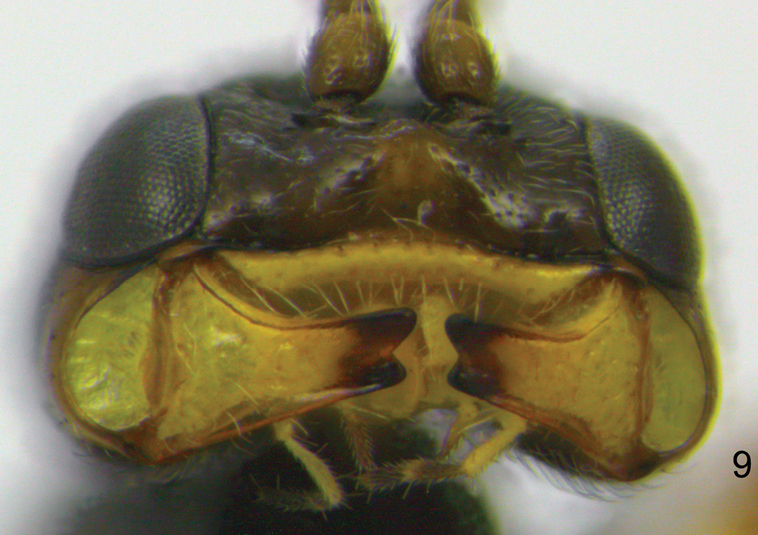
I. elbakyanae has a black face and mandibles which get narrower apically.

I. elbakyanae can be distinguished from the only other Idiogramma species in Mexico, I. comstockii, in having a black or yellowish-brown face, a mandible which is significantly broader at its basal end than its apical end, and an ovipositor sheath which is 4.2 times the length of its hind tibia.

The female has a body length of 3.8 mm (0.15 in) and a forewing length of 3.9 mm (0.15 in).
