= Charles Lester Marlatt =

American entomologist (1863–1954)

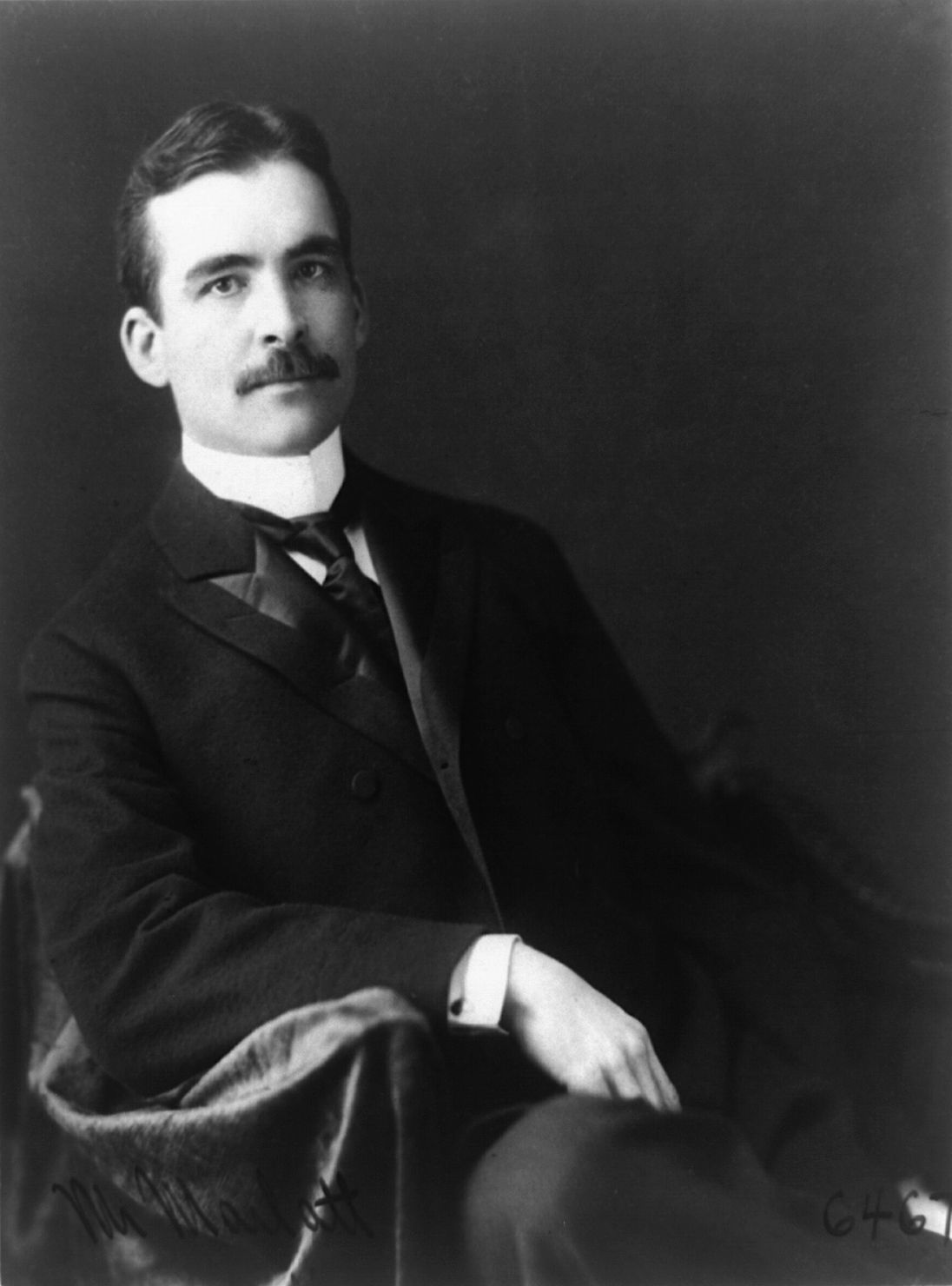
- Marlatt in 1890
- Born: September 26, 1863; Atchison, Kansas, US
- Died: March 3, 1954 (aged 90)
- Education: Kansas State Agricultural College
- Scientific career
- Fields: Entomology
- Workplaces: Bureau of Entomology (USDA); Federal Horticultural Board; Entomological Society of Washington; American Association of Economic Entomologists

Charles Lester Marlatt (September 26, 1863 – March 3, 1954) was an American entomologist who worked in the Bureau of Entomology of the US department of agriculture. He was involved in the creation of Plant Quarantine Act, applications of classical biological control, and recorded the emergence of broods of periodical cicadas across the United States. He also specialized on the systematics of the Tenthredinidae.

== Early life and education ==
Born on September 26, 1863, in Atchison, Kansas, Marlatt was educated at Kansas State Agricultural College (B.S., 1884; M.S., 1886) where he was a classmate of David Fairchild. The university itself grew out of Bluemont College begun in 1858 by several promoters who included Marlatt's father.

== Career ==
After graduation, Marlatt became an assistant professor for two years at Kansas and his skills in drawing insects was noted by Charles Valentine Riley. Riley recruited him into the Bureau of Entomology, United States Department of Agriculture in 1889. He was involved in introduced the ladybug insect Chilocorus similis into the United States to control the San Jose scale insect, which was first discovered in San Jose, California in 1880 by John Henry Comstock and named by him. In 1912, he was appointed chairman of the Federal Horticultural Board. He was president of the Entomological Society of Washington in 1897–98 and of the American Association of Economic Entomologists in 1899.

Marlatt's 1907 description of periodic cicadas remains a classic in the field. In this article, Marlatt proposed a grouping of periodic cicadas into 30 different broods, each given a Roman numeral. Broods I–XVII assigned brood numbers for each of 17 sequential calendar years to 17-year cicadas. Broods XVIII–XXX assigned 13 sequential calendar years to 13-year cicadas. Subsequent research has established that, in fact, not every year produces a brood of periodical cicadas. There are only 15 distinct broods, not 30, but Marlatt's scheme continues to be used.

In Marlatt's role as chief of Chief of the Plant Quarantine and Control Administration he became involved in the passing of the Plant Quarantine Act which was finally passed in 1912.

Marlatt and his newly-wed wife travelled to China and Japan in 1901–2 in search of the natural enemies of the San Jose scale. His wife became ill due to an unknown disease that she contracted on the trip that ultimately caused her death. Marlatt became Chief of the Bureau in 1927 following the retirement of Leland Ossian Howard. In 1922, Marlatt received an honorary doctorate from Kansas State University. He retired in 1938, and died on March 3, 1954, aged 90.

== Legacy ==
Marlatt's red brick home in Washington, DC was built in 1908 and remained in family hands until it was sold in 1970. The Marlatt family maintained the building until selling it in 1970. The wooden banisters have carvings of cicadas. From 1973 to 1975, the Marlatt Mansion was owned by the government of the USSR, which used it to house the Soviet Embassy's Office of the Commercial Counselor, as well as offices of the KGB. During that time, it is believed to have served as the temporary residence of Soviet Communist Party General Secretary Leonid Brezhnev. Since 1994, it has served as the main campus building of a private, accredited graduate school of national security, intelligence, and international affairs, The Institute of World Politics. One of Marlatt's granddaughters, a retired CIA officer, visited the mansion in the 1990s.

== Bibliography ==
- Marlatt, C. L. (1898). "A consideration of the validity of the old records bearing on the distribution of the broods of the periodical cicada, with particular reference to the occurrence of broods VI and XXIII in 1898." Bulletin of the U.S. Bureau of Entomology. 18: 59-78.
- Marlatt, C.L (1898). The Periodical Cicada: An Account of Cicada Septendecim, Its Natural Enemies and the Means of Preventing its Injury, Together with a Summary of the Distribution of the Different Broods. Washington, D.C.: Government Printing Office. OCLC 1039550735 – via Internet Archive.
- Marlatt, C. L. (1898). "A new nomenclature for the broods of the periodical cicada. Miscellaneous results of work of the Division of Entomology." Bulletin of the USDA Division of Entomology. 18: 52-58.
- Marlatt, C. L. (1902). "A New Nomenclature for the Broods of the Periodical Cicada." USDA, Div. Of Entomology, Circ. No. 45. 8 pp.
- Marlatt, C. L. 1906. "The Periodical Cicada in 1906." USDA, Bureau Of Entomology, Circ. No. 14. 5 pp.
- Marlatt, C. L. (1907). The Periodical Cicada. Washington, D.C.: Government Printing Office. LCCN agr07001971. OCLC 902809085 – via Internet Archive.
- Marlatt, C. L. (1907). "The periodical cicada." U.S.D.A. Bureau Entomology Bulletin. 71: 1-181.
- Marlatt, C. L. (1908). "A successful seventeen-year breeding record for the periodical cicada." Proc. Entomol. Soc. Wash. 9: 16-18.
- Marlatt, C. L. (1919). "The '17-year locust' in 1919." U.S.D.A. Circular 127: 1-10.
- Marlatt, C. L. (1923). The periodical cicada. U.S.D.A. Bureau Entomology Bulletin 71: 1-183.
- More, Thomas, Singing Insects of North America, University of Florida map
- Post, Susan L. The Trill of a Life Time, photographs by Michael R. Jeffords, The Illinois Steward, Spring 2004.
- Stannard, Jr., Lewis. The Distribution of Periodical Cicadas in Illinois, 1975.
