= Ruby Green Smith =

American entomologist, peace campaigner and home economics educator

- Born: January 6, 1878; Indiana
- Died: May 13, 1960
- Education: Stanford University, Cornell University
- Occupations: Entomologist, educator, author, biologist
- Employers: Cornell University; Stanford University
- Political party: Woman's Peace Party
- Spouse: Albert William Smith

Ruby Green Smith (January 6, 1878 – May 13, 1960) was an American entomologist, peace campaigner and home economics teacher. She is known for having authored The Home Bureau Creed.

== Early life ==
Smith was born as Ruby Green on January 6, 1878, on a farm near Knightstown, Indiana, the daughter of Marcella Jane (née Hayes), a former teacher, and Dr. Alpheus W. Green, a physician who practiced in Knightstown. She attended Knightstown High School. Her father died while she and her brother and sister were still at school. She was subsequently educated at Stanford University, receiving a B.A. in 1902.

== Career ==
Smith worked as a teacher and head of the Department of Biology and Botany at Stockton High School, Stockton, California, before returning to Stanford University as a research instructor in entomology and bionomics, obtaining an M.A. from the university in 1904. She studied evolution in insects there, under Vernon Kellogg, with whom she co-authored several works, including Studies of Variation in Insects (as Ruby G. Bell, 1904) and Inheritance in Silkworms (1908).

She obtained a PhD from Cornell University in 1914 and began a career in Cornell's Department of Home Economics' Extension Service, teaching home economics as a pathway for women to enter higher education. From being an assistant in 1919, by 1923 she was state leader of home demonstration agents and a professor.

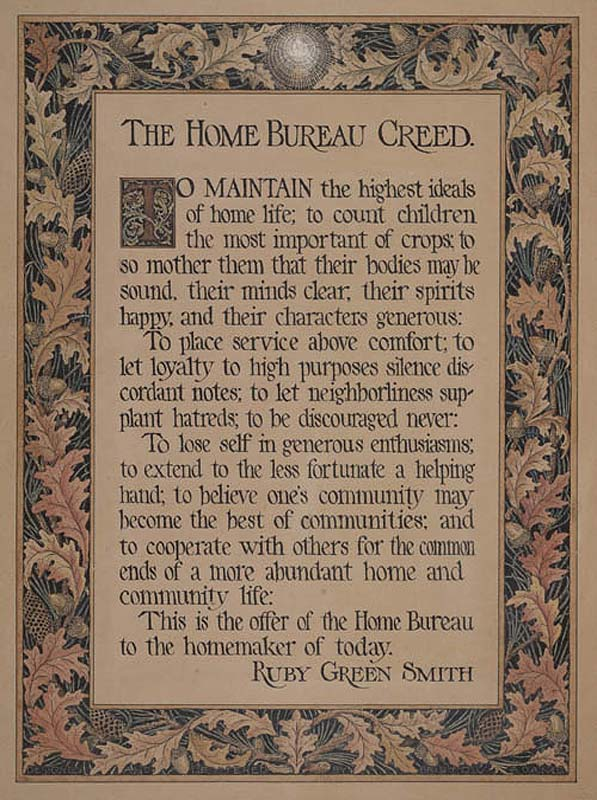
The Home Bureau Creed poster, illustrated by Bristow Adams

In 1919, she authored The Home Bureau Creed, of which over half a million copies were eventually printed and distributed.

She also worked as assistant director of the Conservation Division of the New York State Food Commission, and with the U.S. Department of Agriculture, before her retirement in 1946. (Note: Other Cornell sources give her retirement date as 1944.)

She subsequently wrote The People's Colleges: A History of the New York State Extension Service in Cornell University and the State, 1876–1948.

Together with Glenn Herrick she edited Anna Botsford Comstock's "autobiography" of her husband John Henry Comstock and herself, published in 1953 and titled The Comstocks of Cornell: John Henry Comstock and Anna Botsford Comstock. A 2020 edition, edited by Karen Penders St. Clair and titled The Comstocks of Cornell: The Definitive Autobiography, restored much material that had been withheld from Anna's original manuscript.

== Pacifism ==
In 1915, as Ruby G. Smith, PhD, she contributed a chapter, "Race Problems of World Contact" to the anti-war book The Overthrow of the War System, published in conjunction with the Woman's Peace Party, of which she was an active member.

== Personal life ==
Her first marriage was to Howard Bell of California.

On 16 August 1905, she married a second time, at Stockton, California, to Albert William Smith (1856–1942), who had been head of mechanical engineering at Stanford University from 1891 to 1904, and was then dean of Cornell's Sibley College until his retirement in October 1921. (Note: A. W. Smith was also acting president of Cornell University from April 1920 until his retirement) The couple set up home in Ithaca, New York, where Ruby's mother and sister joined them. Prior to the wedding, she had been living in Stockton with her two young children, Dorothy (later also a graduate of Stanford; died 1938) and Alpheus (later a graduate of Cornell), and her mother. The Smiths' child, Ruth Althea, graduated from Stanford in 1924 and died in 1975.

In 1937, her husband published A Springtime Odyssey on the Shores of Southern Seas, February–May 1912: Letters from Albert W. Smith to Ruby Green Smith in a limited edition of 100. The letters were written while he travelled in the Mediterranean to convalesce from an illness.

Smith founded the Cayuga Bird Club in the fall of 1913, and the Ithaca Housewives' League and Farmers' Market.

== Legacy ==
Smith died at Ithaca on May 13, 1960. Her papers are preserved at Cornell University.
