= Andrew Osborne Hayfield =

American politician (1905–1981)

Andrew Osborne Hayfield (November 13, 1905 – September 24, 1981) was an American politician and businessman.

Hayfield was born in Saint Paul, Minnesota and graduated from Stockton High School, Stockton, California, in 1923. He went to the University of Minnesota and to the Minneapolis College of Law. Hayfield lived in Minneapolis, Minnesota with his wife and family and was involved with the Minnesota Paper Company. Hayfield served in the Minnesota House of Representatives from 1935 until 1941 when he resigned to join the United States Navy after the Attack on Pearl Harbor on December 7, 1941.
