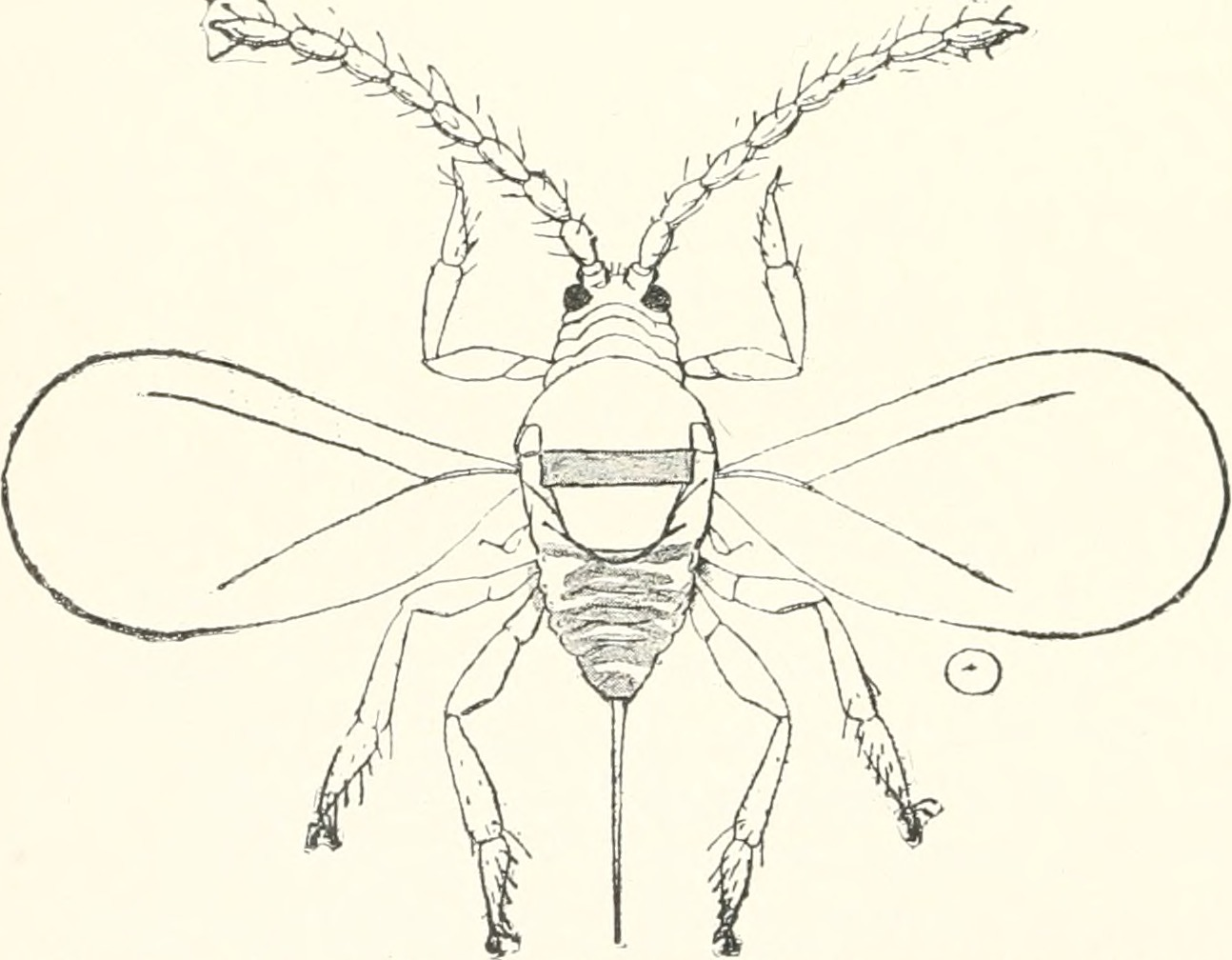
- Male

Scientific classification
- Domain: Eukaryota
- Kingdom: Animalia
- Phylum: Arthropoda
- Class: Insecta
- Order: Hemiptera
- Suborder: Sternorrhyncha
- Family: Diaspididae
- Genus: Comstockaspis
- Species: C. perniciosa

Binomial name
- Comstockaspis perniciosa (Comstock, 1881)

Synonyms
- Aonidiella perniciosa; Aspidiotus perniciosus; Diaspidiotus perniciosus; Quadraspidiotus perniciosus

= San Jose scale =

Species of true bug

The San Jose scale or China scale (Comstockaspis perniciosa) is a hemipterous insect in the family Diaspididae. It is an agricultural pest as it causes damage and crop losses to many fruit crops. In 1914, this species became the first documented case of insecticide resistance.

== Distribution ==
This species originated in Siberia, north east China and the northern part of the Korean peninsula. It has spread to every continent except Antarctica and is a major pest of fruit trees.

=== Arrival in the United States ===
The San Jose scale derives its popular name from San Jose, California where Comstock discovered and named it in 1881. It has been considered the most pernicious scale insect in the United States. It was probably introduced at San Jose about 1870 on trees imported from China by James Lick. By 1890, it had spread over the greater part of California, but was not recognized east of the Rocky Mountains until August 1893, when it was found by Howard on a pear received from Charlottesville, Virginia. Soon afterward it was discovered that infested stock had been brought from California in 1887 or 1888 by two New Jersey nurseries and distributed widely. By 1895 the pest had become established in many nurseries and orchards in the majority of the Eastern States. Marlatt made entomological investigations in China, Japan, and Java in 1901–02. He introduced the ladybird to the United States in order to control the San Jose scale.

== Description ==
The body of adult female is yellow and is covered with a rounded dark gray scale up to two millimetres in diameter. Over the course of two months, yellow crawlers are born viviparously and emerge from the back of the test at the rate of two or three a day. In bad weather they gather under their mother's scale. The crawlers disperse to other parts of the plant and start feeding. They moult after about ten days and begin to lose their eyes, legs and antennae. The adult female appears after the next moult and the scale develops, incorporating the larval exuviae. The development of the male involves three moults. The male nymph is more elongate than the female and the adult male is orange coloured and has wings. It lives only for a few hours.

== Ecology ==
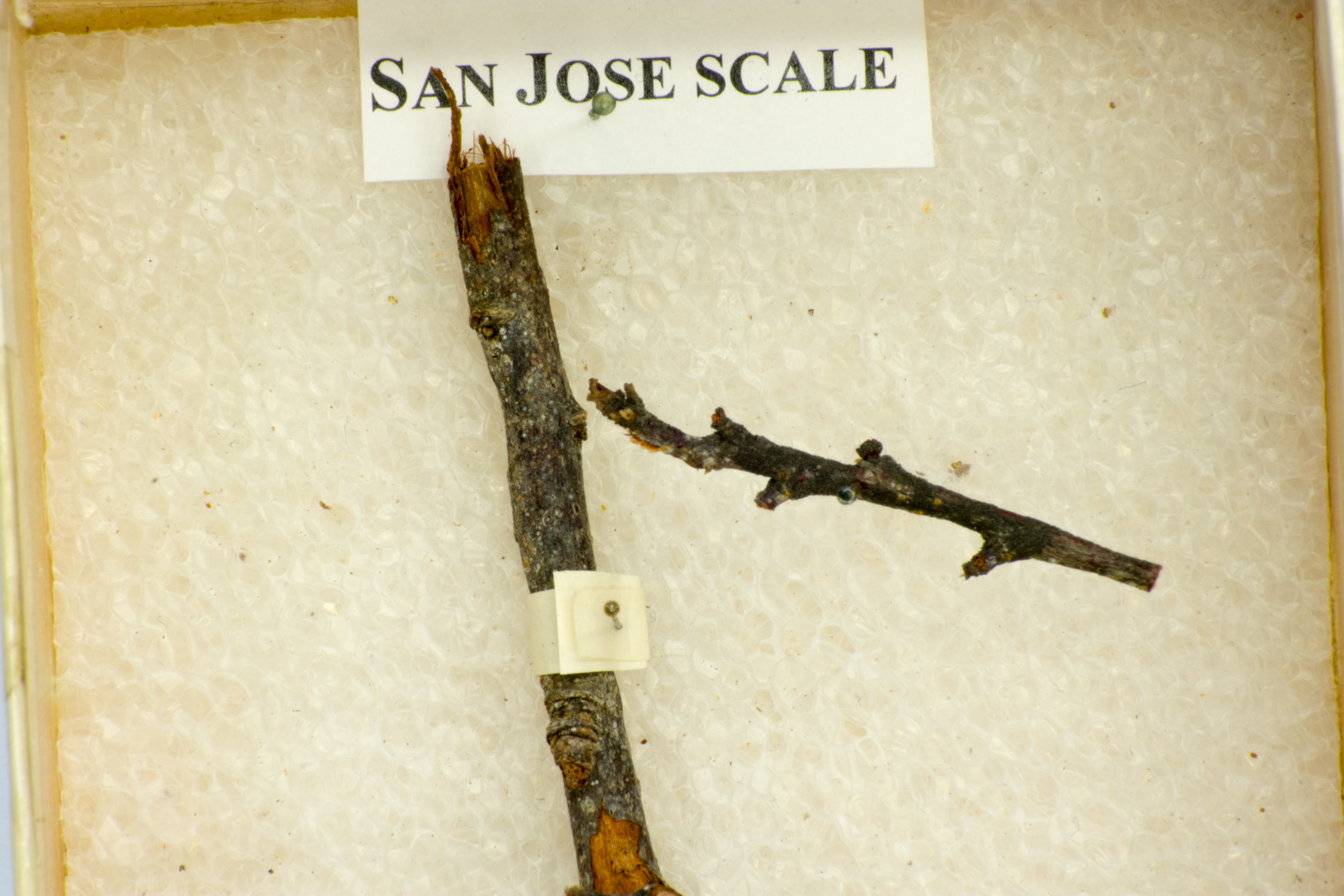
Scale-infected twigs in entomological collection.

This species is found in both temperate and subtropical climates. It infests about two hundred different species of host plant, mostly deciduous trees and bushes. It is found on the trunks, branches, twigs, leaves and fruits of the plant. Females predominate on the leaf stalks and fruit while males predominate on the leaves. There may be several generations each year in warm climates but in cooler regions there is a single generation. The first and second instars may overwinter in cracks in the bark and the hibernating nymphs can survive temperatures as low as −42 °C. The emergence of the nymphs in the spring coincides with bud burst.

== Literature ==
- Numerous articles by L. O. Howard, C. L. Marlatt, A. L. Quaintance, and others, published by the United States Bureau of Entomology (Washington, 1896 et seq.); W. G. Johnson, Fumigation Methods (New York, 1902); United States Department of Agriculture, The Farmer's Bulletin, No. 650 (Washington, 1915), and the publications of the State agricultural experiment stations.
