= John Walton Spencer =

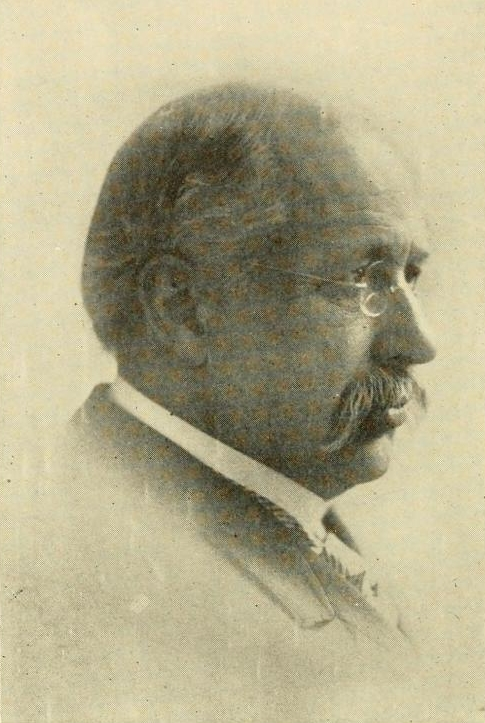

John Walton Spencer (June 12, 1843 – October 24, 1912) was an American public educator and naturalist. He was a lecturer at the State College of Agriculture in New York. He was also involved in extension work at Cornell University and was involved in creating children's societies called "Junior Naturalists" and "Junior Gardeners", giving lectures to children across the region and becoming familiar to young audiences as "Uncle John".

Spencer was born in Cherry Valley, New York and grew up in Westfield, Chautauqua county. Growing up on a farm, he became keenly interested in nature and agriculture. Spencer became a fruit grower and was involved with the Chautauqua Horticultural Society in 1894. Spencer was recruited by Liberty Hyde Bailey to teach nature study as part of the Nature Study Movement begun at Cornell University. He went to Cornell University in 1896 and worked alongside Bailey and Anna Botsford Comstock. Spencer wrote essays and gave talks across schools in New York. Spencer and Alice Gertrude McCloskey began to organize Junior Naturalist Clubs. He founded the "Farmers' Reading-Course Bulletin" and "Nature-Study Leaflets". Nearly 30,000 children were brought into direct intaraction with Cornell University by "Uncle John" and his talks.
