= Stockton High School (California) =

Former school in northern California, U.S.

Coordinates: 37.9511°N 121.2961°W

Information
- Established: 1904
- Closed: 1966
- School district: Stockton Unified School District

Stockton High School (1904–1966), home of the Tarzans, was a high school in Stockton, California, part of the Stockton Unified School District. It opened in 1904 on property bounded by Harding Way, Vine, San Joaquin and California streets. The main building of the old high school, which became Stockton Junior High School in 1948, was deemed unsafe and demolished in 1966. The rest of the buildings were not earthquake-safe and abandoned and demolished. Commodore Skills School opened on the grounds in 1979 and later moved to the building which was formerly Webster Middle School.

California Concerts (also referred to as Jazz Goes to High School) is a live album by saxophonist and bandleader Gerry Mulligan featuring performances recorded at the Stockton High School and Herbert Hoover High School.

During World War II, Stockton High "sponsored" 275 jeeps in the Schools at War program.

== Notable alumni ==
- Melvin Belli, lawyer.
- Gil Evans (born Green; 1912–1988) Canadian-American jazz pianist, arranger, composer and bandleader
- Andrew Osborne Hayfield, Minnesota state legislator and businessman
- Joe Allen Hong, fashion designer who designed Grace Kelly's grooms-maid's wedding dresses at her wedding
- Dolores Huerta, labor rights activist
- Harry Lochhead, baseball player
- Janet Leigh (1927–2004), actress from Psycho
- Nicholas Mayall (1906–1993; Class of 1924) observational astronomer at the Lick Observatory, and MIT's Radiation Laboratory during World War II
- David Rowland (1924–2010, Class of 1942) an American industrial designer noted for inventing the 40/4 Chair
- Oscar Stanage (1883–1964) an American baseball catcher

== Notable faculty ==
- Lawrence Edwin Siemering, football coach, also coached at the college, NFL and CFL levels
- Ruby Green Smith (1878-1960) head of the Department of Biology and Botany; later an entomologist, peace campaigner and home economics educator.
