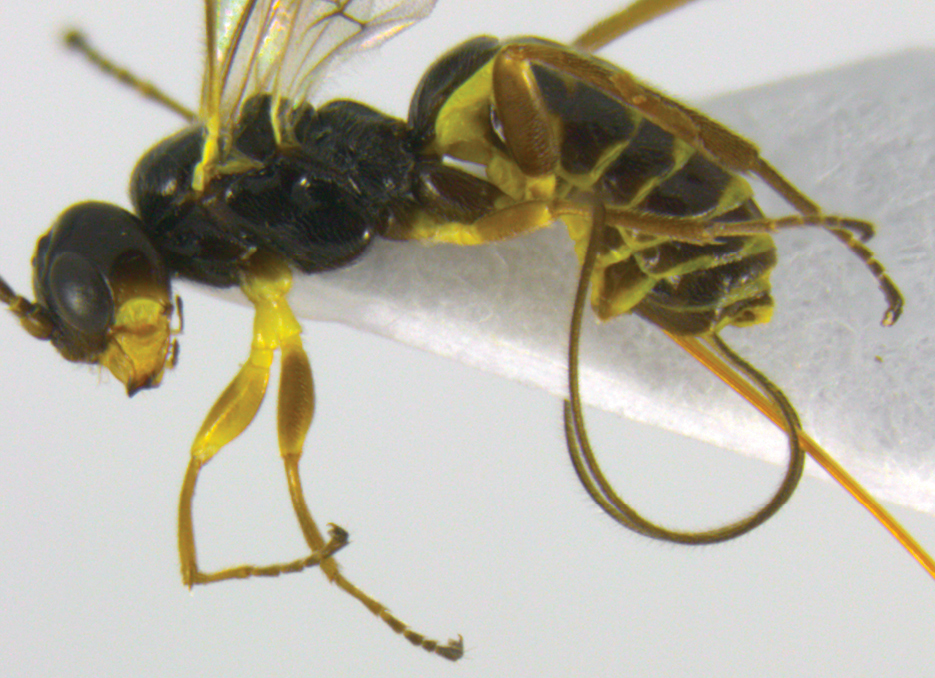
- Idiogramma elbakyanae

Scientific classification
- Kingdom: Animalia
- Phylum: Arthropoda
- Class: Insecta
- Order: Hymenoptera
- Family: Ichneumonidae
- Subfamily: Tryphoninae
- Tribe: Idiogrammatini
- Genus: Idiogramma; Förster, 1869

Type species
- Idiogramma euryops Schmiedeknecht, 1888

= Idiogramma =

Genus of wasp

Idiogramma is a genus of wasp. It is the only extant genus in the tribe Idiogrammatini.

Species include:

- Idiogramma comstockii (Ashmead, 1895)
- Idiogramma elbakyanae Khalaim in Khalaim & Ruíz-Cancino, 2017
- Idiogramma euryops Schmiedeknecht, 1888
