= Nature study =

Education movement in the late 19th and early 20th centuries

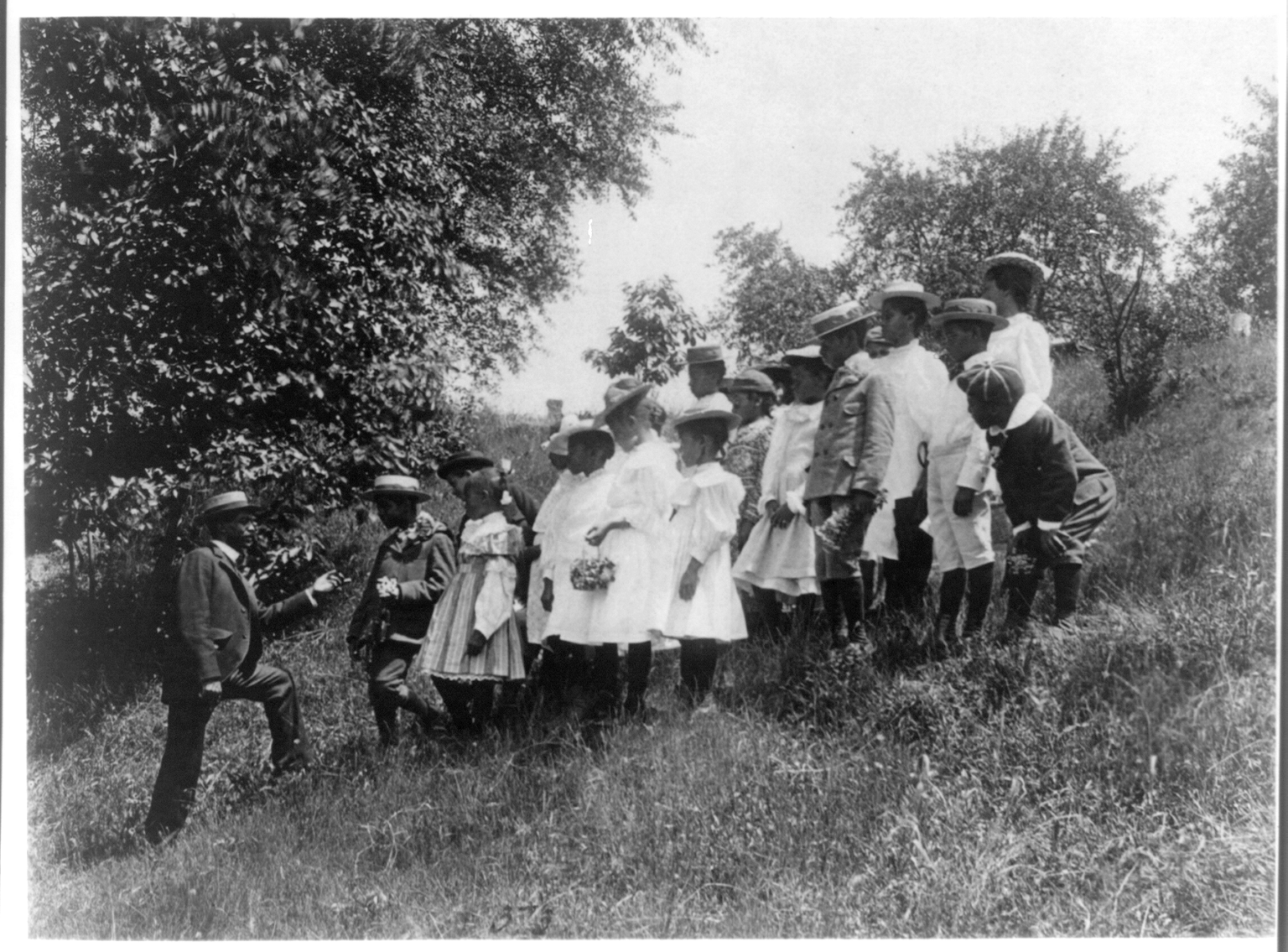
School children on a field trip, photographed by Frances Benjamin Johnson

The nature study movement (alternatively, Nature Study or nature-study) was a popular education movement that originated in the United States and spread throughout the English-speaking world in the late 19th and early 20th centuries. Nature study attempted to reconcile scientific investigation with spiritual, personal experiences gained from interaction with the natural world. Led by progressive educators and naturalists such as Anna Botsford Comstock, Liberty Hyde Bailey, Louis Agassiz, William Gould Vinal, and Wilbur S. Jackman, nature study changed the way science was taught in schools by emphasizing learning from tangible objects, something that was embodied by the movement's mantra: "study nature, not books." The movement popularized scientific study outside of the classroom as well, and has proven highly influential for figures involved in the modern environmental movement, such as Aldo Leopold and Rachel Carson.

== Background ==
By the mid-19th century, a growing concern for the state of the environment began to take shape. In 1864, American diplomat George Perkins Marsh published the groundbreaking book Man and Nature. Highlighting people's responsibility to the natural world, the work marked the beginning of the conservation movement.

Before the 1890s, the idea of nature study existed, but the "efforts had been sporadic and piecemeal." Naturalist Louis Agassiz wanted to capture "learners in studying the natural world." His students, who were influenced by this philosophy, went on to provide the nature study knowledge in public schools. It was Agassiz who coined the phrase, "Study nature, not books."

== Definitions ==
Nature study can be described as "a loose coalition of communities composed of individuals, societies, and institutions able to find some common ground in the study and appreciation of the natural world". In "Leaflet I: What Is Nature-Study?" from a 1904 collection nature study lessons, Liberty Hyde Bailey presented the following description of nature study:

NATURE-STUDY, as a process, is seeing the things that one looks at, and the drawing of proper conclusions from what one sees. Its purpose is to educate the child in terms of his environment, to the end that his life may be fuller and richer. Nature-study is not the study of a science, as of botany, entomology, geology, and the like. That is, it takes the things at hand and endeavors to understand them, without reference primarily to the systematic order or relationships of objects. It is informal, as are the objects which one sees. It is entirely divorced from mere definitions, or from formal explanations in books. It is therefore supremely natural. It trains the eye and the mind to see and to comprehend the common things of life; and the result is not directly the acquiring of science but the establishing of a living sympathy with everything that is.

Anna Comstock defined the idea extensively in her book, Handbook of Nature Study, supplying that: "Nature Study is for the comprehension of the Individual life of the bird, insect or plant that is nearest at hand." Comstock continued that nature study aided "both discernment and in expression of things as they are." The movement came at a time when society was concerned with the future of the next generation and with nature conservation itself, and because of this was met with high regard and high expectations. Though many efforts had come before 1890 by some naturalists and scientists to teach and expand the movement, the nature-study movement really did not gain momentum with the public until the late 19th century. By 1925, the subject had found a place in the curriculum of almost every school district in the United States.

== "Study nature, not books" ==
Many scientists, teachers, and leaders throughout the United States agreed on the value of nature study, and the subject became an important part of how the natural world was examined in many areas of the country by the early 20th century. Scientists gave public support to the philosophy and added to the creation of a curriculum and courses. The movement was particularly popular in the Northeast, the West, and the Midwest. The South also found some use for the idea of natural science in their agriculture schools, as well as at Tuskegee Institute in Alabama (now Tuskegee University) and Hampton Institute in Virginia (now Hampton University). Nature Study could be found in both urbanized, highly populated cities and in rural school systems because of the involvement of scientists in designing and implementing curriculum. For example, Wilbur Jackman created an outline of nature study with "life and its phenomena" which examined how the study of plants and animals would consist of zoology and botany (under biology), physics, chemistry, meteorology, astronomy, geography, geology, and mineralogy.

Lucretia Crocker along with women's clubs and other help in the Boston area, created a "Teachers' School of Science" in Back Bay at the New Museum of the Boston society. Along with an Ellen Swallow Richards, Crocker created a mineralogy course for teachers. Teacher found such education in the Boston area because of area scientist that would teach their courses.

The American Nature Study Society was founded in 1908, and still exists today. The society was an important aspect in helping to bring about the Nature-Study movement. Anna Botsford Comstock is one of the society' past presidents. It is considered to be America's oldest organization for environment.

Anna Botsford Comstock studied and worked as the head of the Department of Nature Study at Cornell University with her husband, John Henry Comstock. Cornell University was considered to be a major hub for the Nature Study movement. She wrote the Handbook of Nature Study, which includes sections on how to teach the subject and how to teach the courses to children, and also includes sections from different species of animals and plants to even the skies.

George Washington Carver was also a noted advocate of nature study. Carver suggested teachers introduce nature study as early as possible, encouraging them to start with "the wee tots, the kindergarteners", and centering cross-curricular connections in addition to agricultural connections. Carver published a series of materials on nature study from 1897 until at least 1910 to promote the integration of hands-on and outdoor education. Carver particularly advocated for building gardens at schools, and for simplifying some broad academic concepts like mutualism and other ecological interactions into the "language of the masses". This work to increase access to and familiarity with nature in schools has been cited by some as proof of Carver's early work in environmental justice.

== Education for children ==
Sciences were expanding in colleges and universities, and scientists felt "that students needed more and better preparation in secondary and primary schools". Not only was the curriculum of schools evolving, but also was the system of education itself. Populations were rising in big urban areas like New York and Chicago, and there was legislation to require students to spend required numbers of hours and days per year in the school system. With a growing population due to immigration and other reasons, young people could be taught useful skills for life and academia in order to "share fundamental civic values and enlarged view of their world". The nature study became the way younger students learned of their natural world. This also came at a time when legislation was being passed for conservation in the country, which helped gather support from parents and educators in the country.

Anna Botsford Comstock, stated in her book Handbook of Nature Study, "nature-study cultivates the child's imagination, since there are so many wonderful and true stories that he may read with his own eyes, which affect his imagination as much as does fairy lore, at the same time nature study cultivates in him a perception and a regard for what is true, and the power to express it...Nature study gives the child practical and helpful knowledge. It makes him familiar with nature's ways and forces, so that he is not so helpless in the presence of natural misfortune and disasters." Comstock also felt that the nature study did not begin with books, but through the observations of life and form from the first naturalists. The point of the system being to "give pupils an outlook over all the forms of life and their relation one to another".

Because of the importance placed on the new generation, the surrounding public watched the schools carefully with high expectations of the students in the late 19th century.

A study in Kim Tolley's the Science Education of American Girls showed that of 127 public school systems, 49% offered Nature-study in all grades, 25% offered in at least six grades, 11% in at least four grades, 5% in three grades or lower, and 10% did not offer it at all in 1925.

== Women in the movement ==
Women played many roles in this movement within American society. Some were able to find supervisory jobs, or jobs as professor in natural history at school districts, or institutions of higher learning. Some women helped to create the movement itself, like Anna Botsford Comstock, and also teachers were able to "[implement] nature study to varying degrees in their classrooms and occasionally modified the curriculum created by male professionals so that it favored the life sciences".

Over the four years from 1915–16 to 1919–20 in the state of Wisconsin, the percentage of women high school biology teachers increased from 50% to 67%. The number of women physics teachers increased from 3% in 1915–16 to 7% in 1919–20.

The nature study movement gave a new outlook to the education of young women in the United States. In the later 20th century, opinions started to change about the movement, and it declined. Some male critics saw it as "romantic" or "sentimental". This created a gender issue that was forcibly imposed on the nature-study movement. By the beginning of the 20th century, many young women were attracted to the natural history movement.

The Science Education of American Girls by Kim Tolley gives an explanation of high schools in America for females. "Higher schools for females served as important centers for the dissemination of the nineteenth-century ideology of separate spheres, institutions commonly located in small towns and in rural, rather than urban, areas. The ideology prevailed in antebellum southern institutions serving elite girls who never expected to work for wages outside the home, in northern schools that explicitly south to prepare teachers for the nation's growing common schools, and in Catholic academies on the western front."

Others, such as Susanna Moodie, and her daughter Agnes Chamberlin who made nature studies to support her family, and Catharine Parr Traill investigated nature to describe the new territories where they found themselves in nineteenth century Canada.

== See also ==
- History of education
- Natural history
- Outdoor education
- Women in science
- Nature deficit disorder
