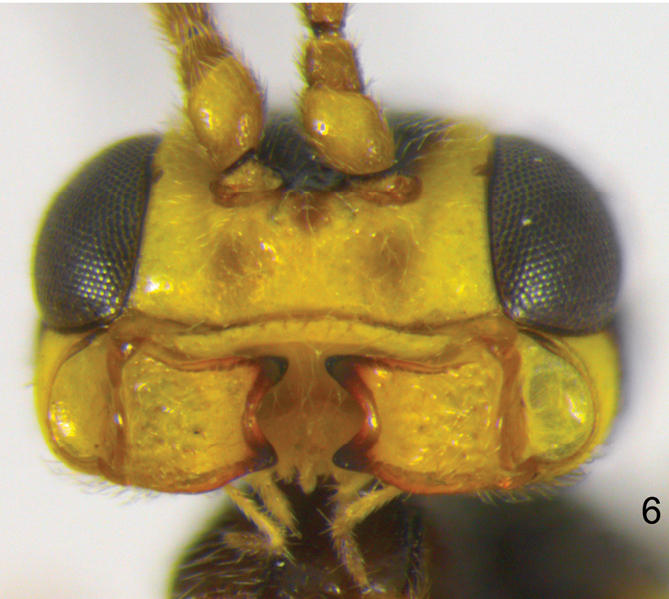
- Female head, antero-ventral view

Scientific classification
- Kingdom: Animalia
- Phylum: Arthropoda
- Class: Insecta
- Order: Hymenoptera
- Family: Ichneumonidae
- Genus: Idiogramma
- Species: I. comstockii

Binomial name
- Idiogramma comstockii (Ashmead, 1895)

Synonyms
- Lysiognatha comstockii Ashmead, 1895; Lysiognatha sulcata Cushman, 1937; Idiogramma sulcata (Cushman, 1937)

= Idiogramma comstockii =

Species of wasp

Idiogramma comstockii is a species of wasp.

William Harris Ashmead initially described the species in 1895 and circumscribed a new genus, Lysiognatha, for it. R. A. Cushman synonymized Lysiognatha with Idiogramma, making the species' name I. comstockii.

The specific name honors John Henry Comstock, who sent Ashmead the specimens in the type series. Herbert Huntingdon Smith collected the specimens in 1872 at Cayuga Lake, Ithaca, New York.

Its distribution includes Canada, the United States, and northeast Mexico.
