= Anna Botsford Comstock =

American artist, educator, conservationist

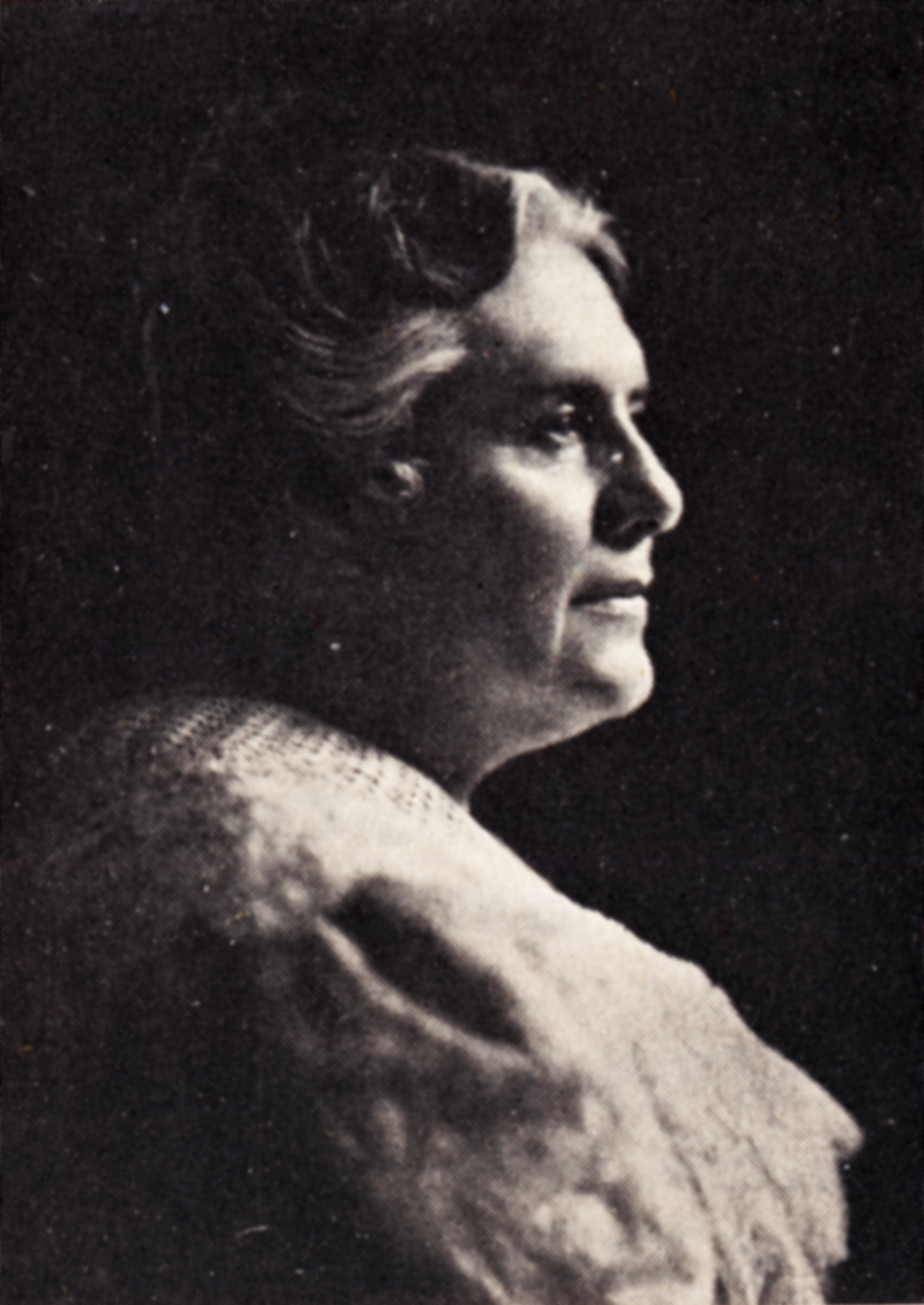
- Born: 1 September 1854; Otto, New York, U.S.
- Died: 24 August 1930 (aged 75); Ithaca, New York, U.S.

Anna Botsford Comstock (September 1, 1854 – August 24, 1930) was an author, illustrator, and educator of natural studies. The first female professor at Cornell University, her over 900-page work, The Handbook of Nature Study (1911), is now in its 24th edition. Comstock was an American artist and wood engraver known for illustrating entomological text books with her husband, John Henry Comstock including their first joint effort, The Manual for the Study of Insects (1885). Comstock worked with Liberty Hyde Bailey, John Walton Spencer, Alice McCloskey, Julia Rogers, and Ada Georgia as part of the department of Nature Study at Cornell University. Together they wrote nature study curricula to develop a curiosity for, and education about, the surrounding natural world. Comstock also was a proponent for conservationism by instilling a love and appreciation of the natural world around people.

== Early life and education ==
Anna Botsford Comstock was born in a log house in Otto, New York to Marvin and Phebe Irish Botsford. At the age of three, the family moved to a frame house on a farm with both a horse and cattle barn. A self-providing family, they raised their own vegetables, had fruit orchards, raised cattle, pigs, sheep, and poultry. As the only child of the family, education was important both in a school house and at home where Comstock and her Quaker mother spent time together examining the wildflowers, birds, and trees. Phebe Botsford shared her passionate love of nature with her daughter, Anna, taking her into the nearby woods and fields. Here Anna learned "...the popular names of sixty or more common flowers; she taught her a dozen constellations..."

In 1871, as there was no high school in Otto, Comstock attended the Chamberlain Institute and Female College, one of two seminaries under the direction of the Methodist Church in Randolph, New York. It was here where Comstock first met the acquaintance of Martha Van Rensselaer, "...never dreaming how closely she would be associated with me in later life." Comstock's years at Chamberlain enhanced her love of literature, oration, and language. She graduated June 1873 giving her Salutatory speech, before her peers, in Latin. Comstock returned to Otto to teach school for a year in which she thoroughly enjoyed. The following summer of 1874, with her parents, Anna traveled westward to visit family. The trip postponed her start at Cornell University, in Ithaca, New York, until November 1874 at the start of the second term.

== Cornell University ==
Anna Botsford enrolled at Cornell in 1874, and faced a variety of challenges. Upon arriving at Cornell, Comstock found that she had to take several examinations in order to enter, and particularly needed tutoring in German. She also lived at a boarding house with several other students, and maintained an active social life. Botsford's course work included both botany and zoology with corresponding laboratory periods in both. When she returned to Cornell in 1875, she was part of the first group of thirty-three young women to move into the newly built Sage Hall on campus.

During the winter semester of 1875, she took an entomology class with John Henry Comstock, who was just two years into his career as a university lecturer. Their friendship bloomed into a romance and marriage (October 7, 1878) and she quietly withdrew from student life to that of the responsibilities of a young professor's wife at the fledgling university. The new Mrs. Comstock illustrated her husband's entomological papers and assisted him with the details of his research and work as an entomologist to the U. S. Department of Agriculture (1879–1881) in Washington, D.C.

Upon their return to Ithaca and academic life at Cornell in 1881, Comstock was determined to "...go back to the University and take the course in science which my husband had taken, and get my degree." Comstock received her diploma from the hands of Cornell President Andrew D. White in June 1885. Comstock became a member of the Kappa Alpha Theta sorority (November 4, 1882), and she was one of the first women elected to the honorary society of Sigma Xi at Cornell in 1888.

== Career ==
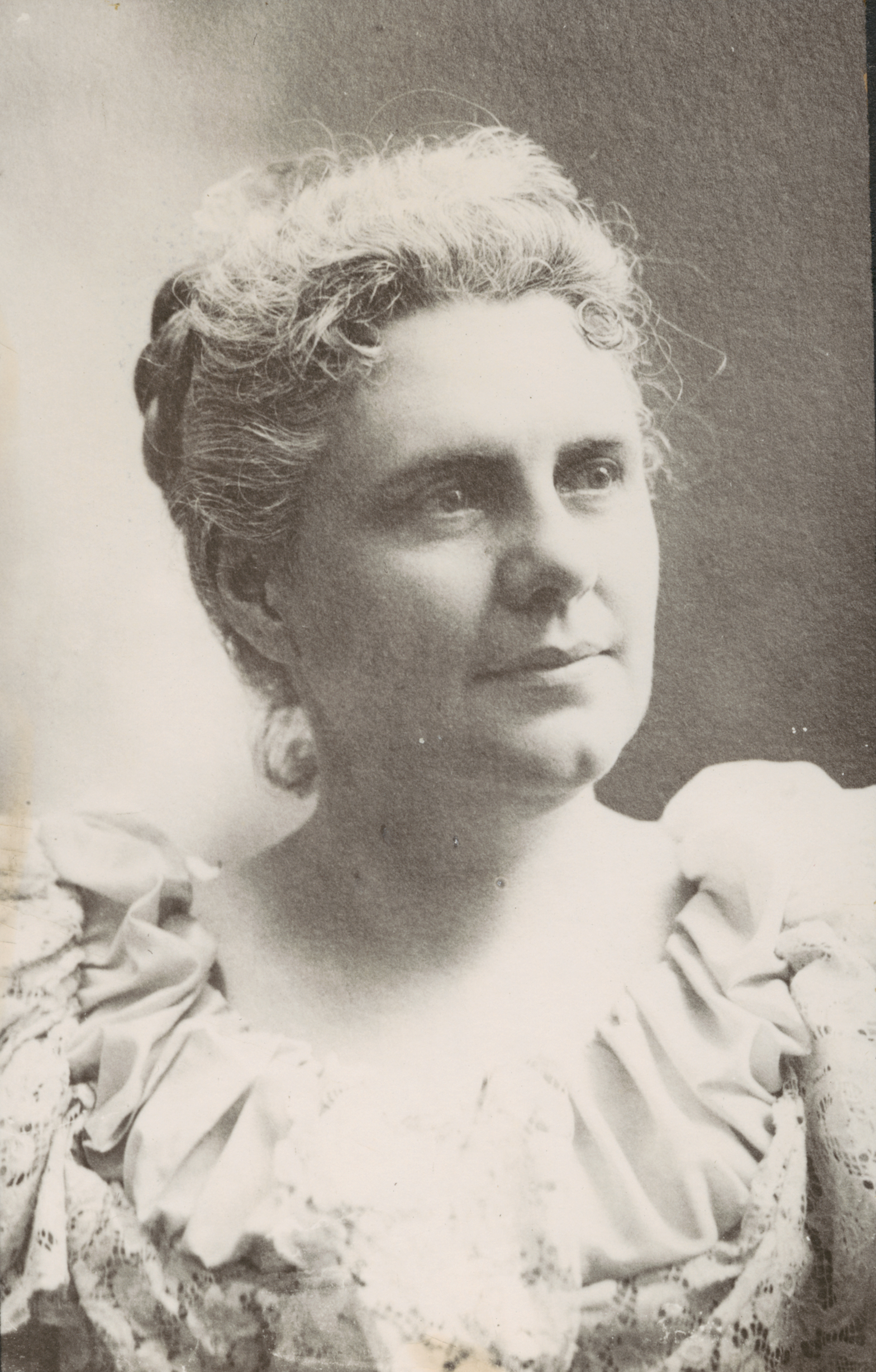
Anna Botsford Comstock, ca. 1900

Throughout her life, Comstock illustrated her husband's lectures and publications on insects. She had no formal training in this illustration; she would study an insect under a microscope then draw it. While her husband was chief entomologist in the U.S. Department of Agriculture from 1879 to 1881, she prepared the drawings for his 1880 Report of the Entomologist on citrus scale insects. She then reentered Cornell and received a degree in natural history in 1885. She studied wood engraving at Cooper Union, New York City, so she could prepare illustrations for her husband's book Introduction to Entomology in 1888. Also in 1888, she was one of the first four women admitted to Sigma Xi, a national honor society for the sciences.

Comstock made engravings for the more than 600 plates used in the Manual for the Study of Insects (1895), Insect Life (1897), and How to Know the Butterflies (1904), the first written by her husband and the latter two co-authored by them. Her engravings appeared in the World's Columbian Exposition in 1893, the Paris Exposition Universelle in 1900, and in the Pan-American Exposition in Buffalo in 1900. She was the third woman to become a member of the Society of American Wood-Engravers, and has been recognized as its most prolific producer of original (as opposed to reproductive) images.

Anna Botsford Comstock both wrote and illustrated several books, including Ways of the Six-Footed (1903), How to Keep Bees (1905), The Handbook of Nature Study (1911), The Pet Book (1914), and Trees at Leisure (1916). She also wrote the novel Confessions to a Heathen Idol (1906). The horticulturist Liberty Hyde Bailey and her husband both told her they expected The Handbook of Nature Study to lose money, but it became a standard textbook for teachers and was later translated into eight languages, with over twenty printings. It is still in print.

Comstock is most famous for being one of the first to bring her students and other teachers out-of-doors to study nature. In 1895, she was appointed to the New York State Committee for the Promotion of Agriculture. In this position, she planned and implemented an experimental course of nature study for the public schools. The program was approved for statewide use through the extension service of Cornell. She then wrote and spoke on behalf of the program, helped train teachers, and prepared classroom materials. Starting in 1897, she taught nature study at Cornell. Comstock was the first female professor at Cornell. After being appointed assistant professor of nature study in 1898, she was demoted to lecturer due to opposition from trustees over the appointment of a woman. She again became an assistant professor in 1913. She was finally recognized as a full professor in 1920. (In 1911, Martha Van Rensselaer and Flora Rose became the first women with full professorships at Cornell.)

Comstock edited Nature-Study Review from 1917 to 1923, and she was on the staff of Country Life in America.

== Later life and legacy ==
In 1922, Comstock retired from Cornell as professor emerita but continued to teach in the summer session. In 1923, the League of Women Voters chose Anna Botsford Comstock and her Cornell colleague, Martha Van Rensselaer, as two of the twelve greatest living American women to have "'contributed most in their respective fields for the betterment of the world.'" In 1930, she received an honorary doctorate in Humane Letters from Hobart College.

Comstock died in Ithaca, New York in 1930. In 1988, she was inducted into the National Wildlife Federation Conservation Hall of Fame.

She was a member of the First Unitarian Society of Ithaca. In 1945, a stained glass window with a portrait of her in long white and blue robes, teaching children in nature, was installed in its sanctuary in her memory.

Comstock Hall, a residence hall at Hobart and William Smith Colleges, was named in her honor.

Camp Comstock, a girl scout camp at Crowbar Point on the west shore of Cayuga Lake, was named in her honor.

=== Memoir ===
Comstock's memoir was posthumously published by heir Glenn Herrick in 1953, edited by him and Ruby Green Smith, titled The Comstocks of Cornell: John Henry Comstock and Anna Botsford Comstock. Herrick and Green heavily edited the original manuscript, removing elements considered irrelevant and removing suggestions of controversy; they also emphasized John Henry's accomplishments over Anna's. In 2020, a new edition of Comstock's memoir was published, based more closely on the 716 surviving pages of Comstock's original manuscript in the Cornell University Archives. The new edition, based on six years of research, attempts to convey "a better sense of what Anna was truly like" by presenting what survives of her actual writings, including accounts of her "marriage, travel, teaching, and scientific study". The new edition of The Comstocks of Cornell: John Henry Comstock and Anna Botsford Comstock; A Complete Biography was published in 2020 by Cornell University Press.

== Gallery ==
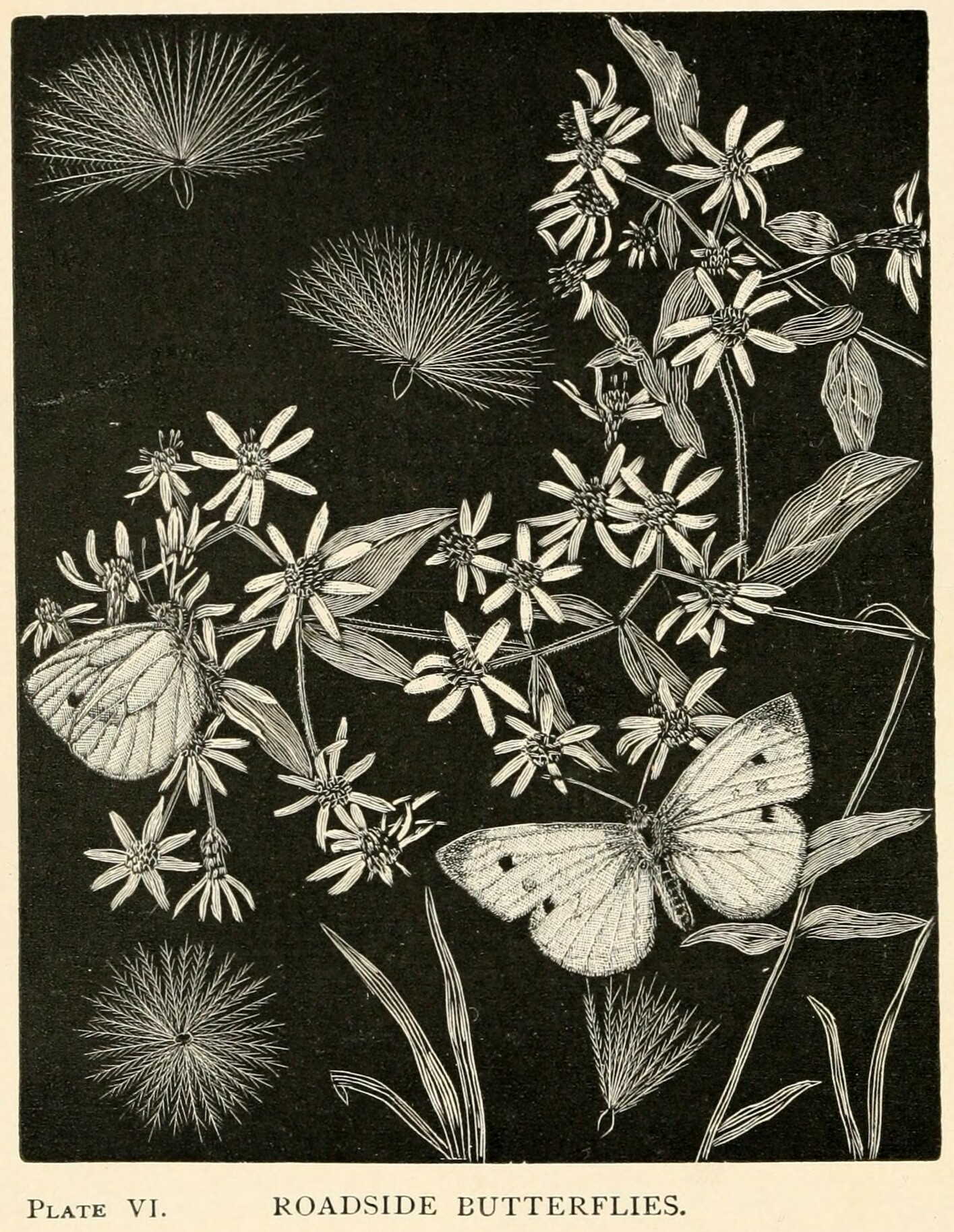

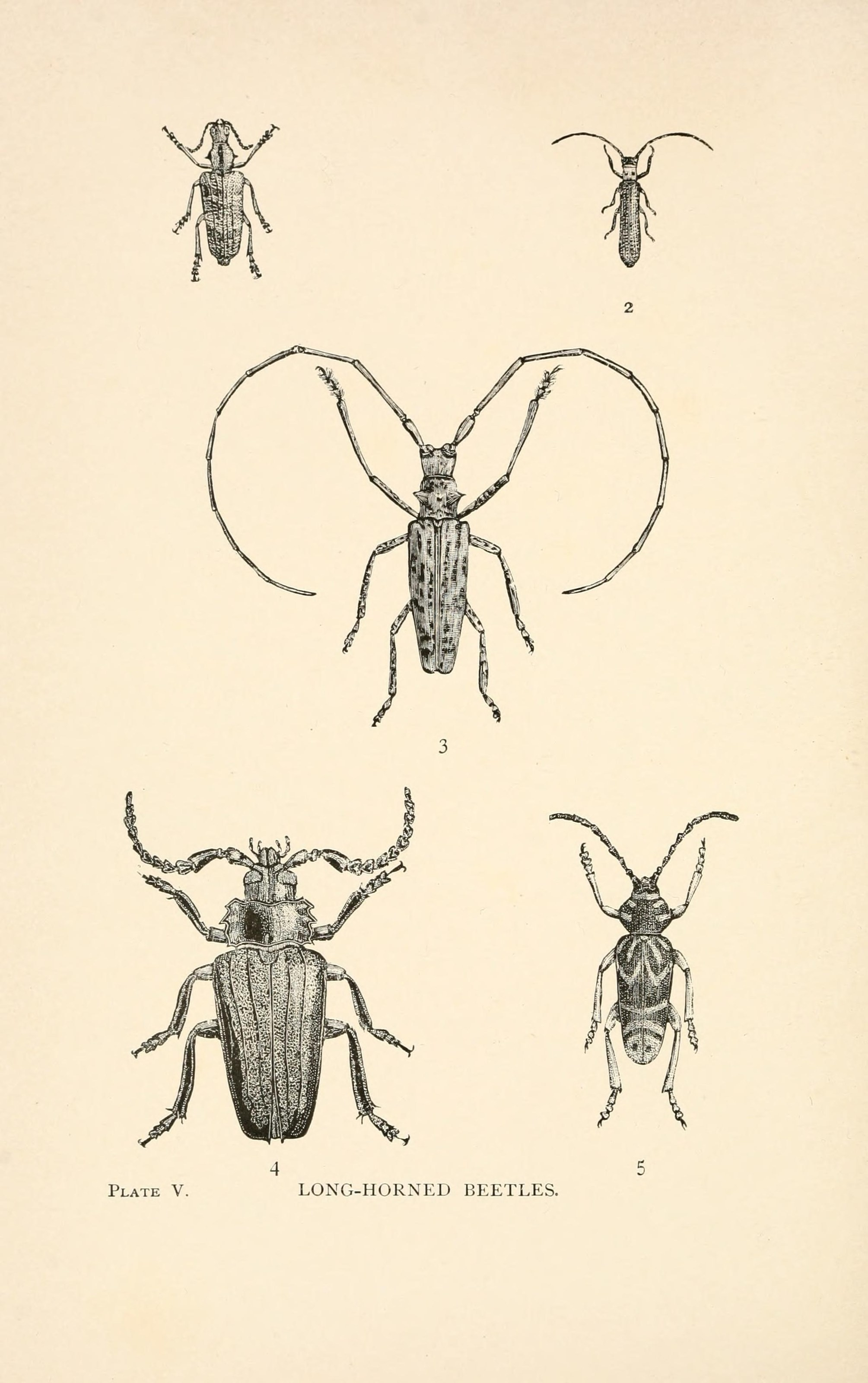

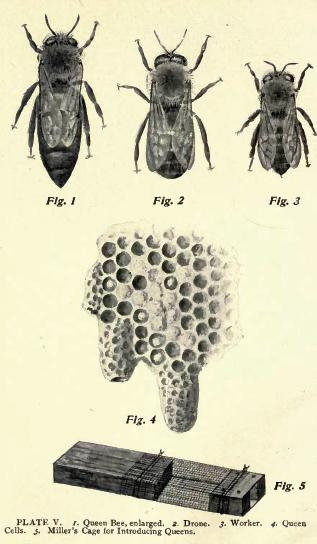

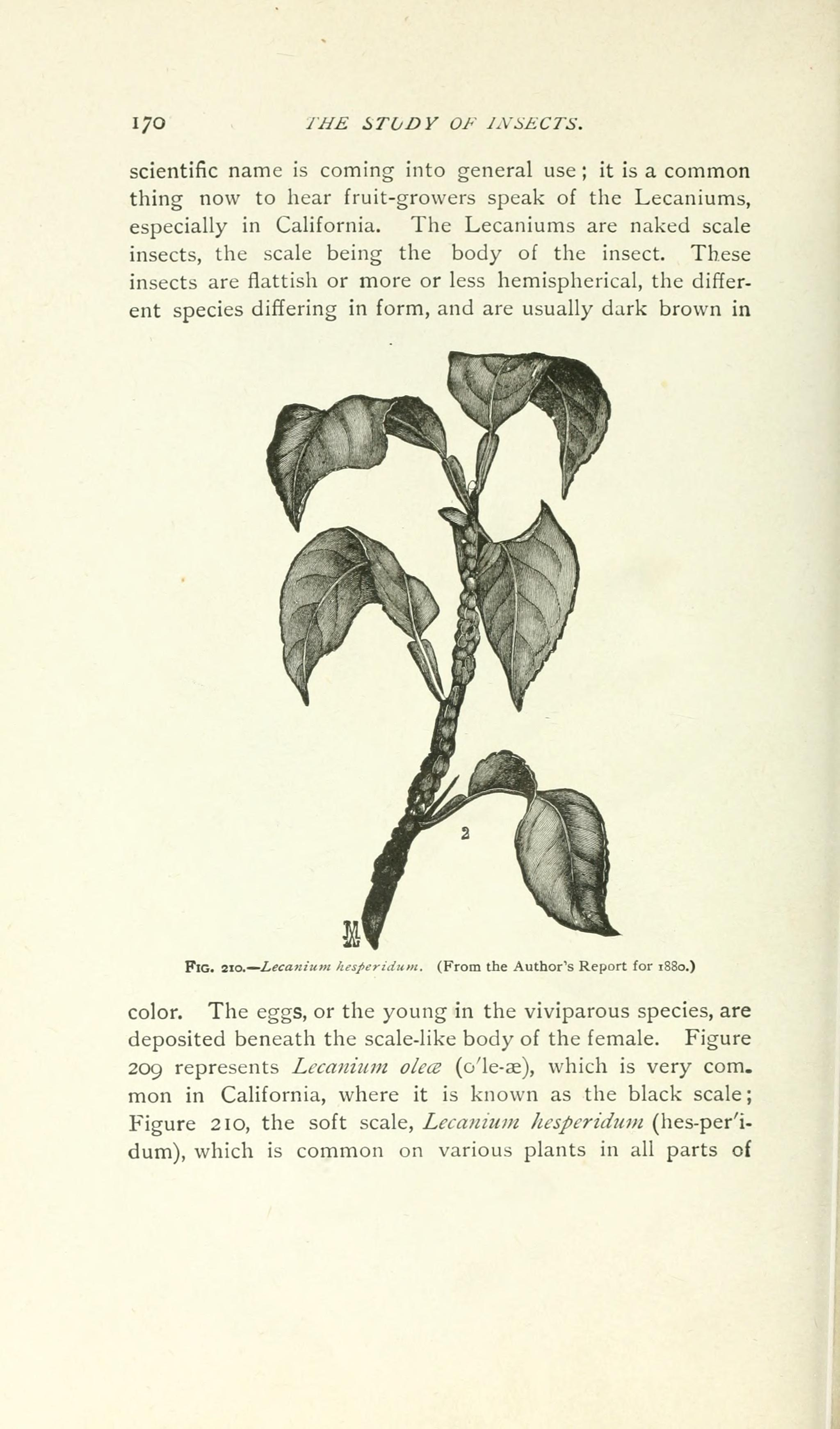

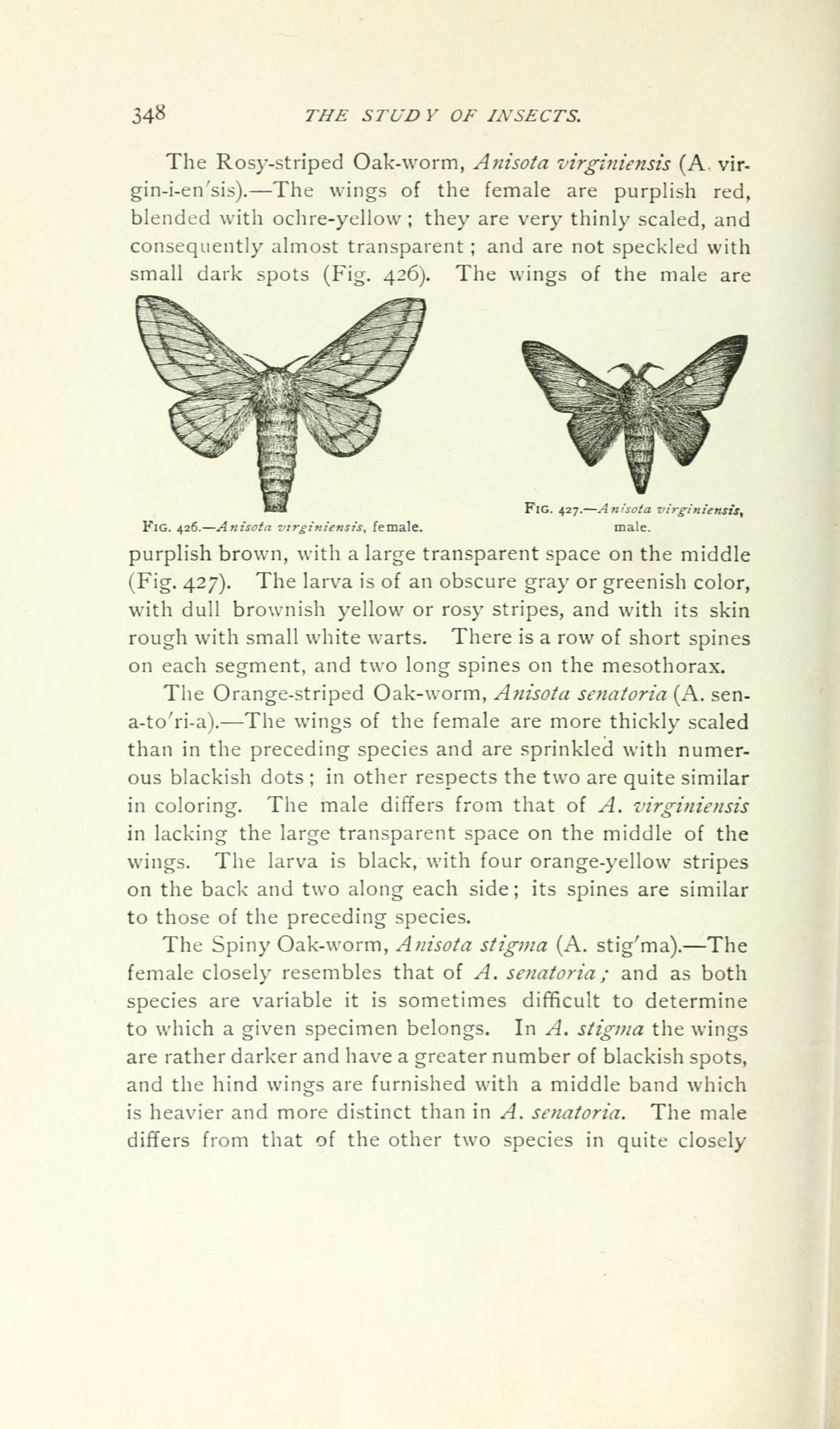

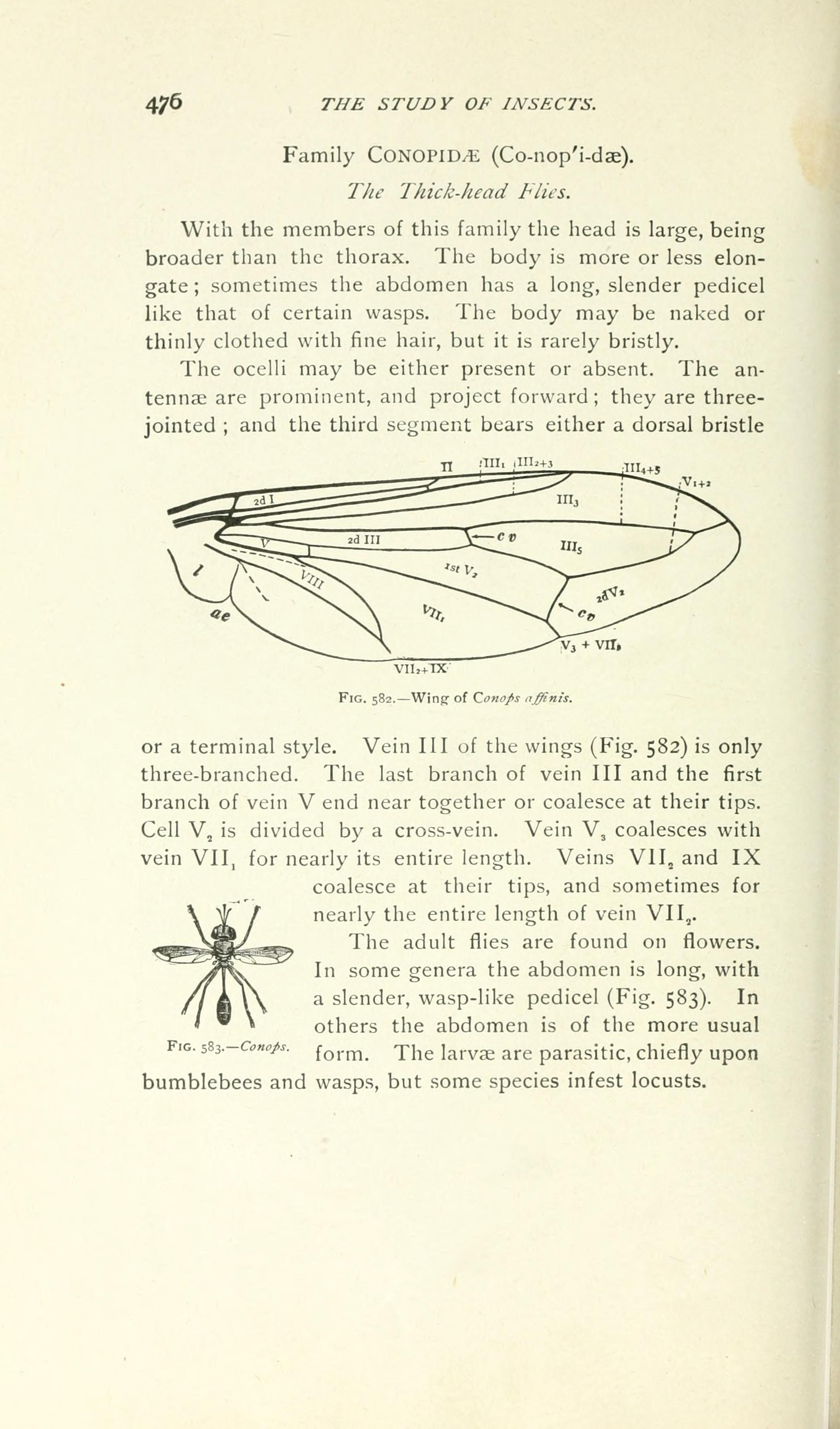

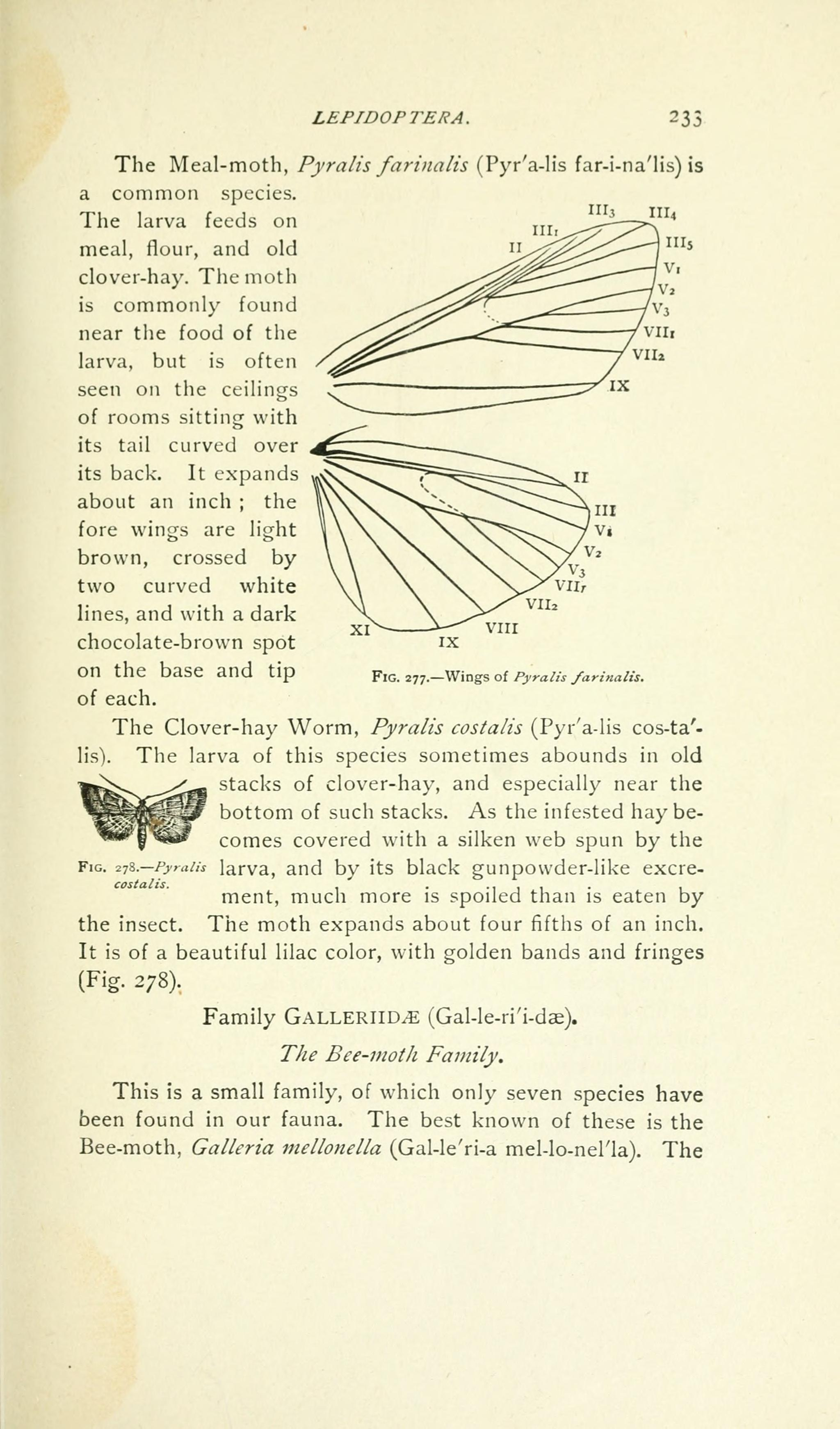

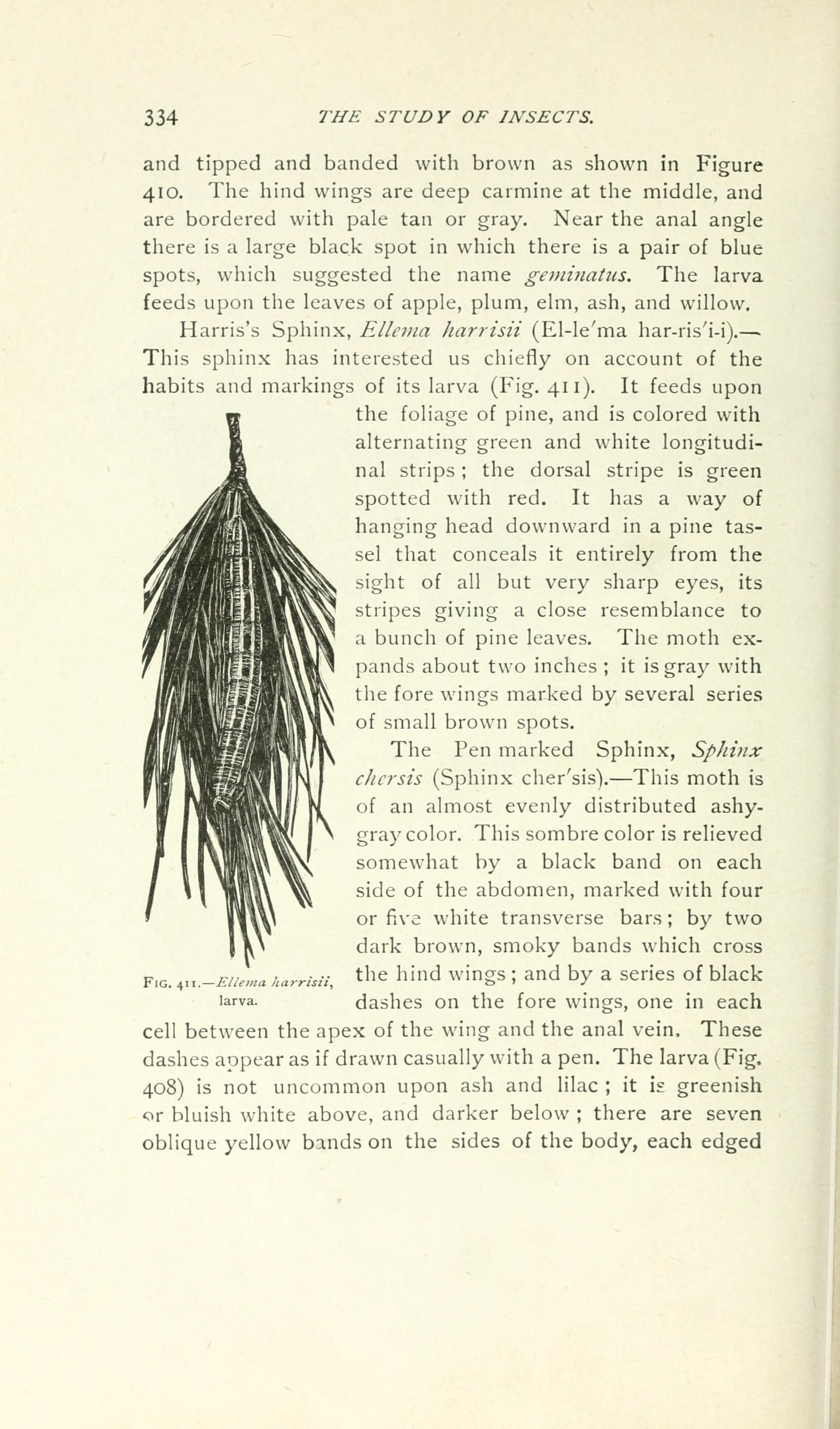

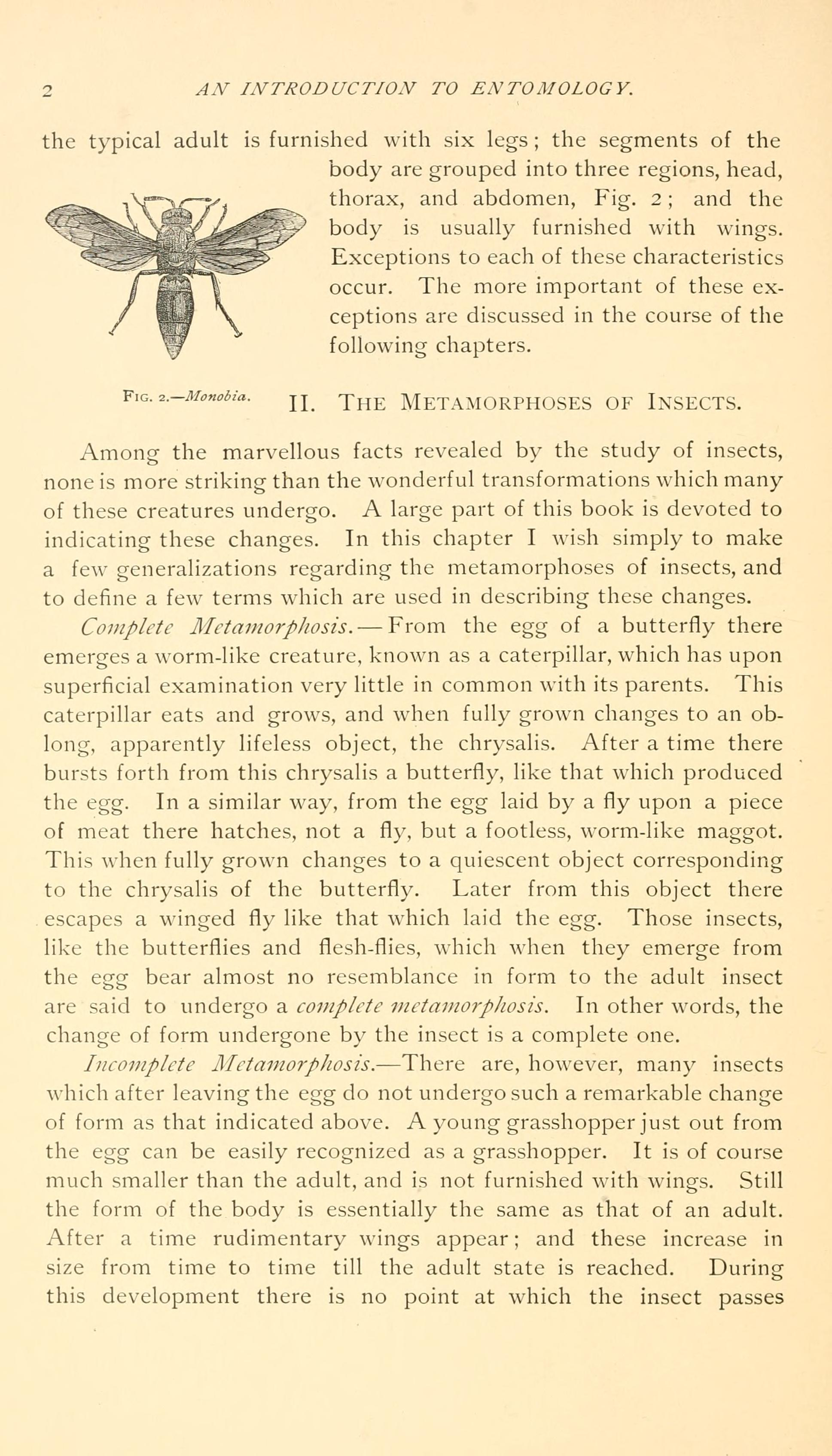

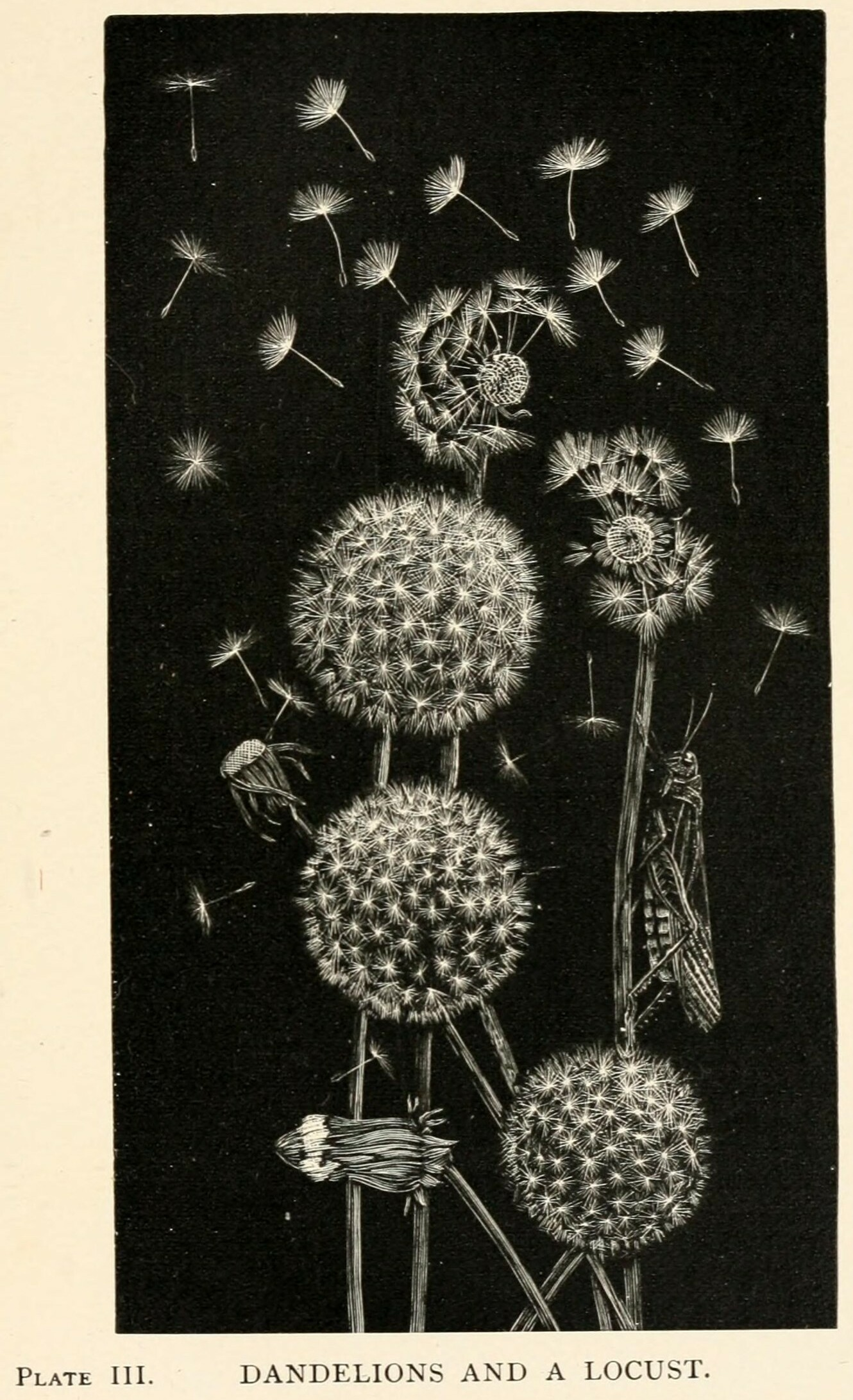

== Sources ==
- Comstock, Anna Botsford (2020). St. Clair, Karen Penders (ed.). The Comstocks of Cornell — The Definitive Autobiography. Ithaca, New York: Cornell University Press. ISBN 978-1-5017-1629-4. OCLC 1104216260.
