= John Henry Comstock =

American entomologist (1849–1931)

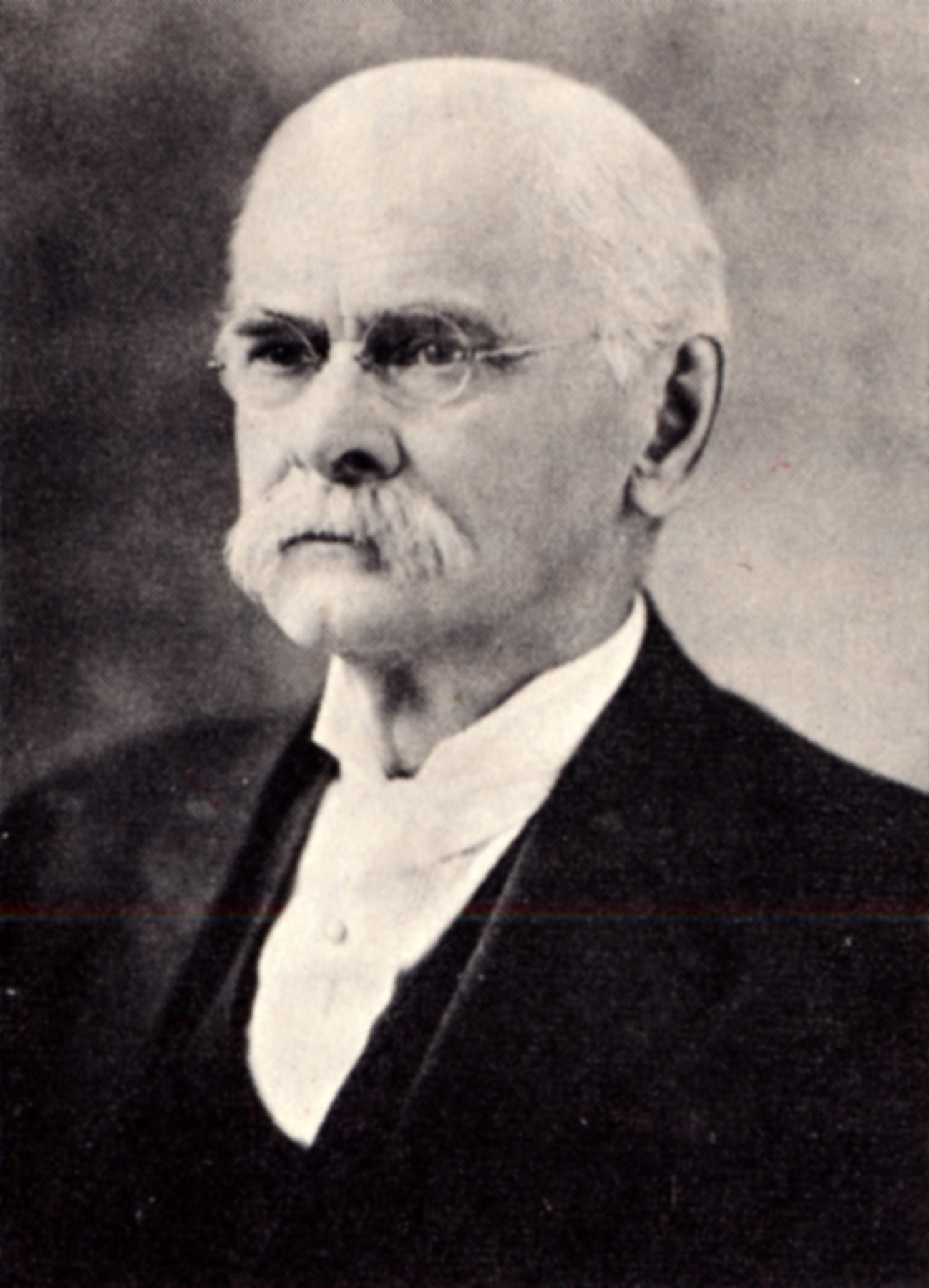
- Born: February 24, 1849; Janesville, Wisconsin
- Died: March 20, 1931 (aged 82)
- Education: Cornell University, Yale University
- Spouse: Anna Botsford Comstock
- Scientific career
- Fields: Entomology, Arachnology
- Workplaces: Cornell University

John Henry Comstock (February 24, 1849 – March 20, 1931) was an eminent researcher in entomology and arachnology and a leading educator. His work provided the basis for classification of butterflies, moths, and scale insects.

== Career ==
Comstock was born on February 24, 1849, in Janesville, Wisconsin. He entered Cornell University as a student in 1869, a year after the school was founded. He also took classes at Harvard University in the summer of 1872 and at Yale University in 1875.

In 1871, while still a student, Comstock became an assistant to professor Burton Green Wilder. In 1872, in the absence of a professor in entomology, students submitted a petition requesting that Comstock be given permission to deliver a course of lectures upon "Insects Injurious to Vegetation". The lectures were successful, and Comstock was appointed instructor of entomology in 1873. He received his Bachelor of Science in June 1874, and was made an assistant professor in 1876.

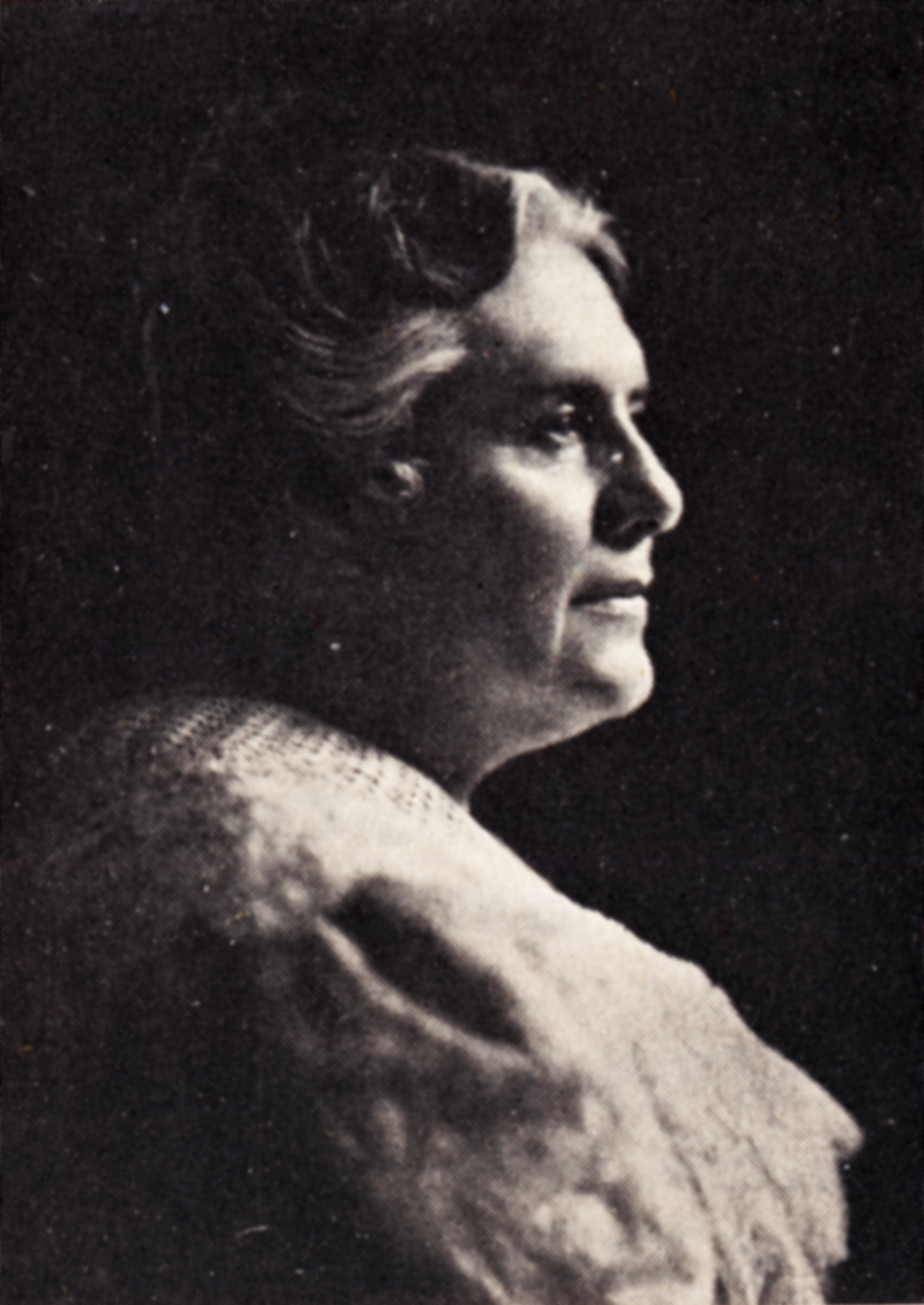
Anna Botsford Comstock

In 1878 Comstock married Anna Botsford. Anna also studied entomology: she earned a degree and worked with her husband to write and illustrate books and articles on the subject. Her beautiful wood engravings illustrate their work. Both became professors of Nature Studies at Cornell. Anna Botsford Comstock was the first female professor at Cornell. Anna wrote an autobiography of the couple, first published in 1953 and edited by Glenn Herrick and Ruby G. Smith, titled The Comstocks of Cornell: John Henry Comstock and Anna Botsford Comstock. A 2020 edition, edited by Karen Penders St. Clair, and titled The Comstocks of Cornell—The Definitive Autobiography, restored much material from Anna's original manuscript.

Comstock worked at Vassar College from 1877 to 1879. Between 1879 and 1881 he became the chief Entomologist of the USDA in Washington, D.C.

In 1882 Comstock returned to Cornell as professor of Entomology and Invertebrate Zoology. He also did work in insect morphology and is best known as the co-proposer of the Comstock-Needham system with James George Needham.

In 1898-1899, Comstock studied at the University of Leipzig. In 1893, John Henry Comstock and Simon Henry Gage founded the Comstock Publishing Company in order to make textbooks on microscopy, histology, and entomology available at a reasonable price to students and to publish the works of Anna Botsford Comstock on nature study.

Comstock was a member or honorary member or fellow of the Entomological Society of France, the Entomological Society of Belgium, and the Entomological Society of London. He was an elected member of the American Philosophical Society. In 1912 he attended the 250th anniversary of the Royal Society of London as the representative of Cornell University, and represented the Entomological Society of London at the 100th anniversary of the Academy of Natural Sciences of Philadelphia.

Comstock retired from teaching and administrative work in 1914 at age 65, but continued to do research and write.

Comstock, through his own work and that of his wife and students, had a significant influence in the development of entomology departments throughout the United States.

He suffered a stroke on August 5, 1926, and lived as an invalid until his death on March 20, 1931.

== The John Henry Comstock Award ==
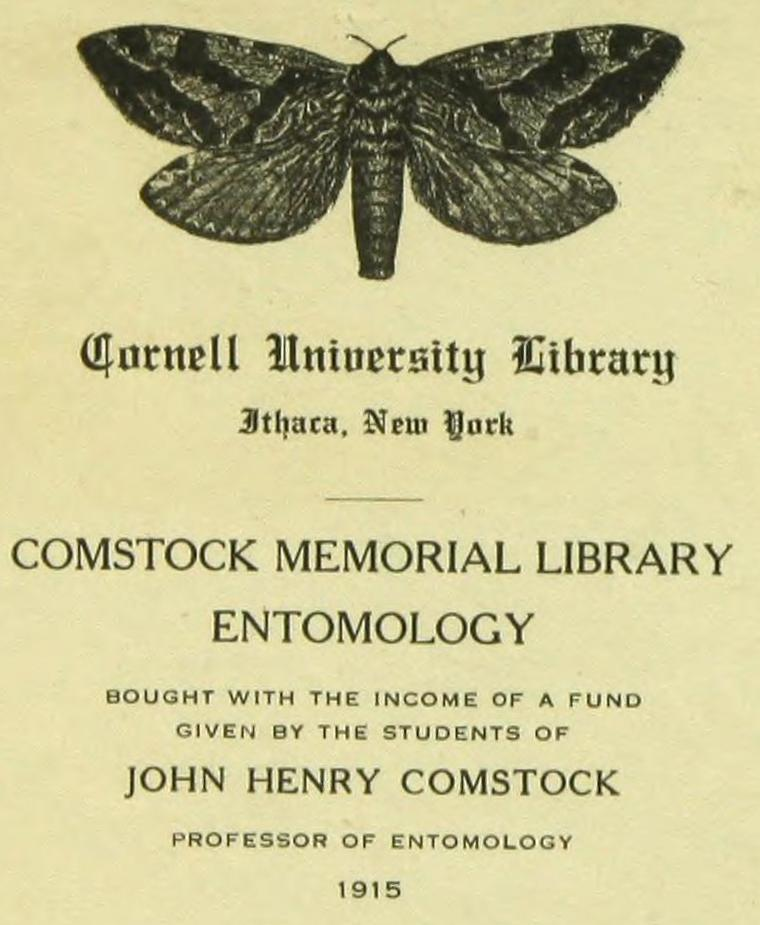
A student fund book plate from Cornell University's Comstock Memorial Library in 1915

The Entomological Society of America gives out an award in each of its six branches to the outstanding graduate student of the year. This award is the John Henry Comstock Graduate Student Award.

== Publications ==
Comstock published many books and articles including:

- Introduction to Entomology (1908).
- A Manual for the study of insects (1930) jointly credited and illustrated by Anna Botsford Comstock.
- The Spider book: a manual for the study of the spiders and near relatives (1912).
- Notes on Entomology (Ithaca, 1875).
- Annual Reports of Entomologist (Washington, 1879–1881).
- Report on Cotton Insects (1879).
- Second Annual Report of the Department of Entomology of Cornell University, including a monograph on Diaspinae (Ithaca, 1883).
- an article on Hymenoptera in the "Standard Natural History" (Boston, 1884).

== See also ==
- Idiogramma comstockii
