= Podonectria =

Scientific classification
- Kingdom: Fungi
- Division: Ascomycota
- Class: Dothideomycetes
- Order: Tubeufiales
- Family: Tubeufiaceae
- Genus: Podonectria; Petch

Type species
- Podonectria coccicola (Ellis & Everh.) Petch

Genus of fungi

Podonectria is a genus in the monotypic Podonectriaceae family of fungi. They are parasitic fungus on scale insects, other fungi, or on substrates that had previously colonized by other fungi.

The family of Podonectriaceae was introduced to accommodate genus Podonectria by Dao et al. in 2016. This was later confirmed by ITS and LSU data.

== Description ==
They generally have a sexual morph that has a byssoid (wispy, cottony or teased wool appearance) stromata which is well-developed or scant and white to brown or dark-brown. The ascomata is solitary or aggregated, superficial on or immersed in the stroma. It is globose to subglobose, obpyriform or ovoid in shape, cream white to light yellow, or brown to dark brown in colour and covered with hairs or absent. The hamathecium (i.e., all of the fungal hyphae or other tissues between asci) consists of numerous reticulate, filiform, septate and branched pseudoparaphyses. The asci is 8-spored, bitunicate (double walled) and long clavate to cylindric in shape. The ascospores are long clavate to long cylindric, or vermiform in shape. They are also multiseptate. The species in the genus also have an asexual morph that is tetracrium-like. The sporodochia is formed directly on cushion-shaped, white, orange, or brown, and hard stroma. The conidiophores are moniliform (bead-shaped). The conidia are usually 1–4 'arm-like', narrowed toward the apex, joined at the basal cell and multiseptate.

== History ==
Genus Podonectria was introduced by Petch, to accommodate species of Ophionectria (in the Nectriaceae family), which are parasitic on scale insects and have thick-walled asci, long, multiseptate ascospores, and a tetracrium-like conidial stage. The type species, Podonectria coccicola (Ellis and Everh.) Petch was transferred from Ophionectria coccicola (Ellis & Everh.) Berl. & Voglino and is associated with the scale insects of Aonidiella aurantia (Maskell), Aspidiotus perniciosus (Comstock), Chrysomphalus aonidum (Linnaeus), Lepidosaphes beckii (Newman), Lepidosaphes gloverii (Packard), Leucapsis sp., Parlatoria pergandii Comstock, Parlatoria ziziphi Lucas, and Unaspis citri (Comstock) which are all mainly found on Rutaceae species of plants. Species Puttemansia aurantii (Henn.) Höhn, was initially found to be the type specimen of the asexual morph Tetracrium aurantii Henn. and is associated with scale insect Parlatoria ziziphi which feeds on Citrus aurantium L., was also transferred to the Podonectria genus as Podonectria aurantii (Henn.) Petch. A new species collected from Lepidosaphes sp. on Citrus nobilis Lour. was named as Podonectria echinata. Additionally, two new species, Podonectria gahnia Dingley and Podonectria novae-zelandiae Dingley, were reported by J.M. Dingley in 1954 from scale insects in New Zealand, they were later followed by a new fungus Podonectria tenuispora Dennis collected from Lepidosaphes ulmi (Linnaeus) found on Calluna vulgaris (L.) Hull. Subsequently, Rossman transferred species Ophionectria coccorum Petch, associated with Fiorinia juniperi Kuwana, and also Lasiosphaeria larvaespora Cooke & Massee on an undetermined scale insect also to Podonectria, viz. Podonectria coccorum (Petch) Rossman and Podonectria larvaespora (Cooke & Massee) Rossman. The fungal species Trichonectria bambusicola Rehm was referred as Podonectria bambusicola (Rehm) Piroz. on account of it having scolecosporous ascospores (having very long worm-like spores) and tetracrium-like conidia by Pirozynski. However, Podonectria bambusicola was excluded because of its occurrence on living leaves of bamboo rather than scale insects and remained an unclassified loculoascomycete (class of fungi with bitunicate Ascomycota). Rossman then published a monograph on Podonectria and accepted eight species in 1978. A later examination of the type specimen of Trichonectria bambusicola further revealed that this was a synonym of Uredinophila erinaceae (Rehm) Rossman. The genus Podonectria was characterized by having fleshy, white to brown, uninoculated ascomata with bitunicate asci and long, multiseptated ascospores and also being associated with scale insects. Spatafora et al. transferred the previously reported species Podonectria cicadellidicola Kobayasi & Shimizu and Podonectria citrina Kobayasi & Shimizu to genus Ophiocordyceps (family Ophiocordycipitaceae, Order Hypocreales), supported by the previous phylogenetic analyses presented in Quandt et al in 2014. In 2019, Yang et al. found Podonectria sichuanensis C.L. Yang & X.L. Xu parasitic around the ascomata of fungus Neostagonosporella sichuanensis C.L. Yang, X.L. Xu & K.D. Hyde (in the Phaeosphaeriaceae family) on (water bamboo) Phyllostachys heteroclada Oliv in China. In 2021, 3 fungi were associated with Kuwanaspis howardi, a scale insect on Phyllostachys heteroclada (fishscale bamboo) and Pleioblastus amarus (bitter bamboo) in China. New species Podonectria kuwanaspidis X.L. Xu & C.L. Yang sp. nov. and Podonectria novae-zelandiae Dingley, as well as Microcera kuwanaspidis X.L. Xu & C.L. Yang sp. nov. (Nectriaceae family, Hypocreales order),

== Species ==
As accepted by Species Fungorum;

- Podonectria aurantii (Henn.) Petch 1921
- Podonectria bambusicola (Rehm) Piroz. 1977
- Podonectria coccicola (Ellis & Everh.) Petch 1921
- Podonectria coccorum (Petch) Rossman 1977
- Podonectria echinata Petch 1921
- Podonectria gahnia Dingley 1954
- Podonectria larvispora (Cooke & Massee) Rossman 1977
- Podonectria novae-zelandiae Dingley 1954
- Podonectria sichuanensis C.L. Yang & X.L. Xu (2019)
- Podonectria tenuispora Dennis 1958

Former species;

- P. cicadellidicola Kobayasi & Shimizu (1977) = Ophiocordyceps cicadellidicola, Ophiocordycipitaceae
- P. citrina Kobayasi & Shimizu (1977) = Ophiocordyceps citrina, Ophiocordycipitaceae
