= Parlatoreopsidina =

Scientific classification
- Domain: Eukaryota
- Kingdom: Animalia
- Phylum: Arthropoda
- Class: Insecta
- Order: Hemiptera
- Suborder: Sternorrhyncha
- Family: Diaspididae
- Subfamily: Aspidiotinae
- Tribe: Parlatoriini
- Subtribe: Parlatoreopsidina

Subtribe of true bugs

Parlatoreopsidina is a subtribe of armored scale insects.

== Genera ==
- Benaparlatoria Balachowsky, 1953
- Genaparlatoria McGillivray, 1921, more often as a synonym for Parlatoria in Parlatoriina
- Microparlatoria Takahashi, 1956
- Paraparlagena Mamet, 1959
- Parlagena McKenzie, 1945
- Parlaspis McKenzie, 1945
- Parlatoreopsis Lindinger, 1912
- Sishanaspis Ferris, 1952
