= Leucaspidini =

Scientific classification
- Domain: Eukaryota
- Kingdom: Animalia
- Phylum: Arthropoda
- Class: Insecta
- Order: Hemiptera
- Suborder: Sternorrhyncha
- Family: Diaspididae
- Subfamily: Aspidiotinae
- Tribe: Leucaspidini; Atkinson

Synonyms
- Thysanaspidini Takagi

Tribe of scale insects

Leucaspidini is a tribe of armored scale insects.

== Genera ==
These genera are members of the tribe Leucaspidini.

- Anamefiorinia Leonardi 1906
- Gomezmenoraspis Balachowsky, Hendersonaspis & Normark, 2019
- Labidaspis Borchsenius & Williams 1963
- Leucaspis Targioni Tozzetti 1868
- Lopholeucaspis Balachowsky
- Mongrovaspis Bodenheimer 1951
- Namaquea Munting 1969
- Salicicola Lindinger 1905
- Suturaspis Lindinger 1909
- Thysanaspis Ferris 1955
