= William LeBaron (entomologist) =

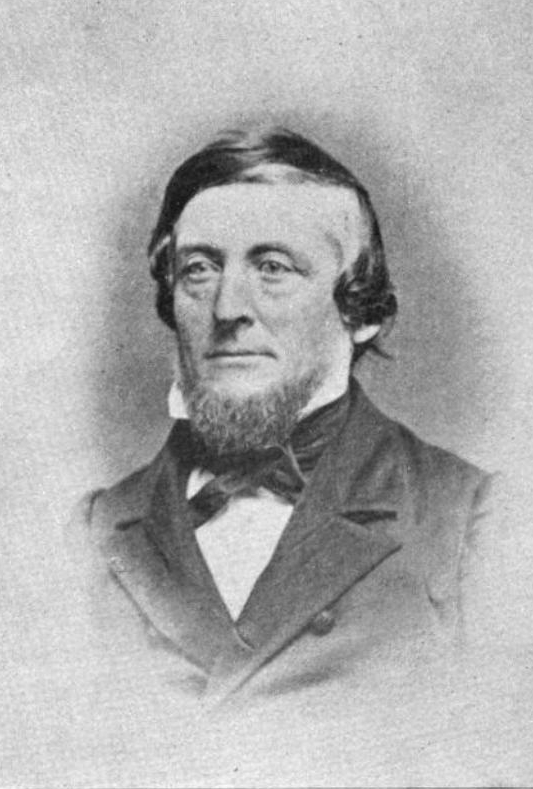

William LeBaron (October 18, 1814 – October 14, 1876) was a medical doctor and naturalist who served as the second state entomologist for Illinois (1870-1875). He succeeded Benjamin Dann Walsh who was killed in an accident.

== Life and work ==
LeBaron was born in North Andover, Massachusetts, the son of physician Lemuel and Martha. He went to a school run by Dr Putnam and then studied medicine in North Andover under maternal grandfather Joseph Kittredge and formally studied medicine at the Harvard Medical College after which he practiced. He married Sarah Jarvis Carr and they moved to Geneva, Illinois, in 1841. He was a naturalist with interest in botany and insects. He was appointed state entomologist of Illinois by Governor John M. Palmer after the death of Benjamin Dann Walsh in 1870. He published four annual reports on the pests of Illinois from 1871 to 1874. He believed that most pests have a stage in their life when they are amenable to control measures. LeBaron was a founding member of the Illinois Natural History Society along with Cyrus Thomas and Benjamin Dann Walsh. He conducted experiments and found that Paris Green was effective against codling moth caterpillars. He also suggested the introductions of insect parasites. He described a parasite Aphelinus mytilaspidis which he considered as a potential control agent for Lepidosaphes ulmi. He had a special interest in 13- and 17-year cicadas, corresponding with many observers to produce a distribution map of Brood XIII of the 17-year cicada in 1871. He sought to produce a textbook of entomology, part of which he wrote as an "outline of entomology" appended to the fourth annual report. He died at Elgin, survived by his wife and five children. His daughter Fannie donated his insect collections to the University of Illinois in 1885.
