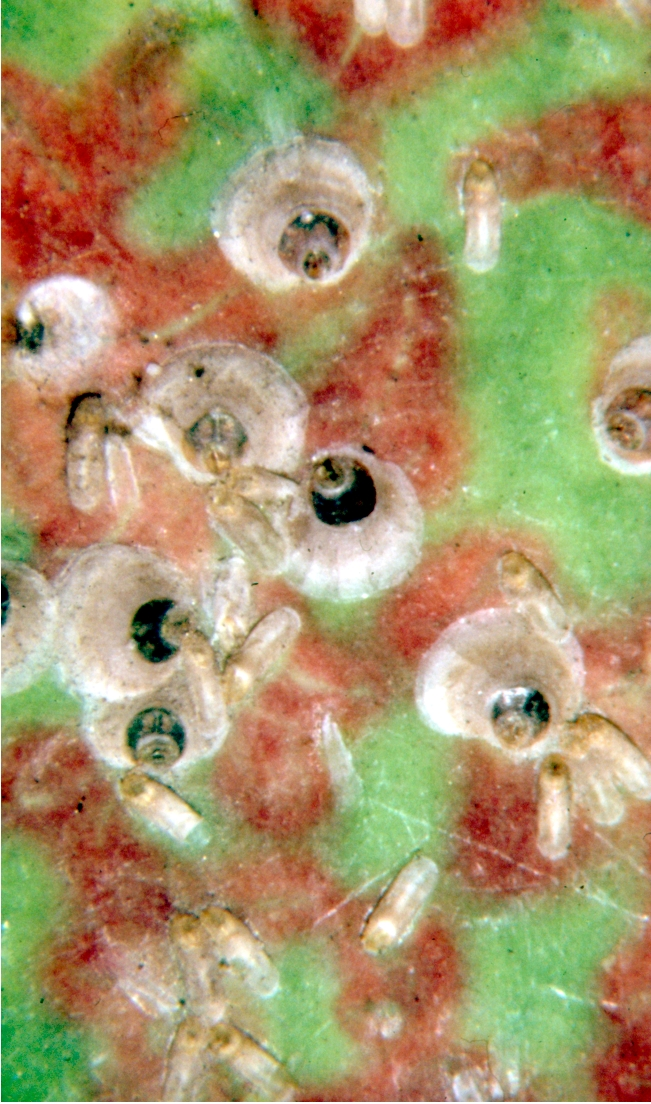
- Parlatoria oleae, olive parlatoria scale

Scientific classification
- Kingdom: Animalia
- Phylum: Arthropoda
- Class: Insecta
- Order: Hemiptera
- Suborder: Sternorrhyncha
- Family: Diaspididae
- Subfamily: Aspidiotinae
- Tribe: Parlatoriini
- Subtribe: Parlatoriina
- Genus: Parlatoria; Targioni-tozzetti, 1869

= Parlatoria =

Genus of true bugs

Parlatoria is a genus of scales and mealybugs in the family Diaspididae. There are at least 70 described species in Parlatoria.

== Species ==
These 77 species belong to the genus Parlatoria:

- Parlatoria abieticola Takagi, 1977
- Parlatoria acalcarata McKenzie, 1960
- Parlatoria affinis (Ramakrishna Ayyar, 1930)
- Parlatoria alba Bellio, 1929
- Parlatoria aonidiformis Green, 1899
- Parlatoria araucariae (Williams & Watson, 1988)
- Parlatoria arengae Takagi, 1969
- Parlatoria artocarpi Green, 1919
- Parlatoria asiatica Borchsenius, 1949 (Tadzhikistan ephedra scale)
- Parlatoria atalantiae Green, 1905
- Parlatoria bambusae Tang, 1984
- Parlatoria banksiae (Maskell, 1896)
- Parlatoria blanchardi (Targioni Tozzetti, 1892) (date palm scale)
- Parlatoria boycei McKenzie, 1952
- Parlatoria bullata Green, 1896
- Parlatoria camelliae Comstock, 1883 (camellia parlatoria scale)
- Parlatoria cinerea Hadden, 1909 (apple parlatoria)
- Parlatoria cingala Green, 1899
- Parlatoria cinnamomi Rutherford, 1915
- Parlatoria cinnamomicola Tang, 1984
- Parlatoria citri McKenzie, 1943
- Parlatoria crotonis Douglas, 1887 (croton parlatoria scale)
- Parlatoria crypta McKenzie, 1943 (mango white scale)
- Parlatoria cupressi Ferris, 1953
- Parlatoria desolator McKenzie, 1960
- Parlatoria destructor Newstead, 1914
- Parlatoria emeiensis Tang, 1984
- Parlatoria ephedrae (Lindinger, 1911) (Tadzhikistan ephedra scale)
- Parlatoria ficus (Ramakrishna Ayyar, 1919)
- Parlatoria flava Takahashi, 1951
- Parlatoria fluggeae Hall, 1929
- Parlatoria fulleri Morrison, 1939
- Parlatoria ghanii Hall & Williams, 1962
- Parlatoria hastata (Lindinger, 1910)
- Parlatoria hydnocarpus Hu, 1986
- Parlatoria keteleericola Tang & Chu, 1983
- Parlatoria leucaspis (Lindinger, 1905)
- Parlatoria liriopicola Tang, 1984
- Parlatoria lithocarpi Takahashi, 1935
- Parlatoria machili Takahashi, 1931
- Parlatoria machilicola Takahashi, 1933
- Parlatoria mangiferae (Ramakrishna Ayyar, 1924)
- Parlatoria marginalis McKenzie, 1945
- Parlatoria menglaensis Niu & Feng, 2018
- Parlatoria mesuae Rutherford, 1914
- Parlatoria multipora McKenzie, 1945
- Parlatoria mytilaspiformis Green, 1899
- Parlatoria namunakuli Green, 1922
- Parlatoria octolobata (Takagi & Kawai, 1966)
- Parlatoria oleae (Colvée, 1880) (olive parlatoria scale)
- Parlatoria orientalis Ramakrishna Ayyar, 1919
- Parlatoria parlatoreoides (Lindinger, 1911)
- Parlatoria parlatoriae (Šulc, 1895) (Sulc's conifer scale)
- Parlatoria pergandii Comstock, 1881 (Pergande's scale)
- Parlatoria phyllanthi Green, 1905
- Parlatoria piceae Takagi, 1956
- Parlatoria pini Tang, 1984
- Parlatoria pinicola Tang, 1984
- Parlatoria piniphila Tang, 1984
- Parlatoria pittospori Maskell, 1891 (mauve pittosporum scale)
- Parlatoria proteus (Curtis, 1843) (common parlatoria scale)
- Parlatoria ramakrishnai (Green, 1919)
- Parlatoria reedia Zhang, Feng & Liu, 2006
- Parlatoria rutherfordi Green, 1922
- Parlatoria sclerosa (Munting, 1968)
- Parlatoria serrula Hall & Williams, 1962
- Parlatoria sexlobata (Takagi & Kawai, 1966)
- Parlatoria stigmadisculosa Bellio, 1929
- Parlatoria tangi Normark, 2019
- Parlatoria theae Cockerell, 1896 (tea parlatoria scale)
- Parlatoria tsugicola Takagi, 1977
- Parlatoria tsujii Tanaka, 2010
- Parlatoria vandae McKenzie, 1960
- Parlatoria vateriae Green, 1919
- Parlatoria yanyuanensis Tang, 1984
- Parlatoria yunnanensis Ferris, 1950
- Parlatoria ziziphi (Lucas, 1853) (Mediterranean scale)
