= Parlatoria blanchardi =

Scientific classification
- Kingdom: Animalia
- Phylum: Arthropoda
- Clade: Pancrustacea
- Class: Insecta
- Order: Hemiptera
- Suborder: Sternorrhyncha
- Family: Diaspididae
- Genus: Parlatoria
- Species: P. blanchardi

Binomial name
- Parlatoria blanchardi (Targioni Tozzetti, 1892)

Synonyms
- Aonidia blanchardi Targioni Tozzetti, 1892; Apteronidia blanchardi Berlese, 1895; Coccus blanchardi Ferris, 1936; Parlatoria blanchardii Fernald, 1903; Parlatoria brauchardi Borchsenius, 1937; Parlatoria palmae McKenzie, 1945; Parlatoria victrix Cockerell, 1895; Websteriella blanchardii Ferris, 1937

Species of true bug

Parlatoria blanchardi, the date palm scale, is a species of armored scale insect in the family Diaspididae. It is a widespread and serious pest of palms, both date palms and ornamental species.

== Description ==
The adult female test is an elongated oval shape, and is whitish, with a pale brown raised area with a darker brown or blackish central area. Underneath the scale, the insect is nearly circular, pink at first, changing to yellowish-brown when mature. The male test is whitish and also elongate oval, but is smaller than the female's test. Males can be winged or wingless, but females never have wings.

== Distribution ==
Parlatoria blanchardi is thought to originate from Mesopotamia but has spread to many other tropical and subtropical regions. It occurs in North Africa, Saudi Arabia, France, Spain, Italy, Palestine, Jordan, Syria, Turkey, Afghanistan, Iran, Iraq, Turkmenistan, Pakistan and India. It also occurs in Australia, the United States, Brazil, Bolivia and Argentina.

== Hosts ==
This scale insect is largely a pest of palm trees, but has been recorded on ten genera in four plant families. Species affected include the palms Chamaerops humilis, Hyphaene thebaica, Latania, Nannorrhops, Phoenix canariensis, Phoenix dactylifera, Pritchardia and Washingtonia filifera, as well as Jasminum, Vinca major and Ziziphus mauritiana.

== Ecology ==
Parlatoria blanchardi is a serious pest of commercial date palms and ornamental palms, particularly affecting neglected trees. Infestations tend to be concentrated in the crown and leaves, with the succulent tissues at the base of the leafstalks being particularly badly affected. The insects may be seen on the leaflets where they form little patches of dead tissue, but most remain undetected under the sheathing leaf stalks. The vigour of the tree is reduced, the leaf blades may wither, and the dates may be unsaleable. In 1920, a particularly bad infestation in Algeria killed nearly 100,000 date palms.
