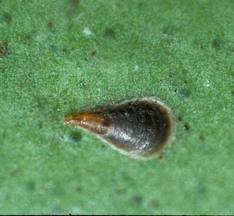

Scientific classification
- Domain: Eukaryota
- Kingdom: Animalia
- Phylum: Arthropoda
- Class: Insecta
- Order: Hemiptera
- Suborder: Sternorrhyncha
- Family: Diaspididae
- Genus: Lepidosaphes
- Species: L. beckii

Binomial name
- Lepidosaphes beckii (Newman, 1869)

Synonyms
- Coccus beckii Newman, 1869; Mytilaspis flavescens Mytilaspis citricola Mytilaspis fulva Lepidosaphes pinnaeformis Mytilococcus beckii Cornuaspis beckii

= Lepidosaphes beckii =

Species of true bug

Lepidosaphes beckii also known as purple scale, mussel scale, citrus mussel scale, orange scale, comma scale and mussel purple scale is a scale insect that is a pest of Citrus trees. The small insects attach themselves to leaves, fruits and small branches and cause injury by sucking the tree's sap.

The specific name beckii is in honour of historian Richard Beck.

== Description ==
Lepidosaphes beckii was originally described under the name Coccus beckii by English entomologist Edward Newman from a fruit imported to Great Britain. Newman's original description reads as follows:

It appeared as a narrow scale about a tenth of an inch in length, slightly bent at one extremity, and always adhering so closely to the rind of the apple that it is scarcely possible to remove it entire. The females are larger than the males, and never by any chance leave the spot where they first fasten themselves: the male is winged, ...

The adult female citrus mussel scale is up to three millimetres long.

== Host plants ==
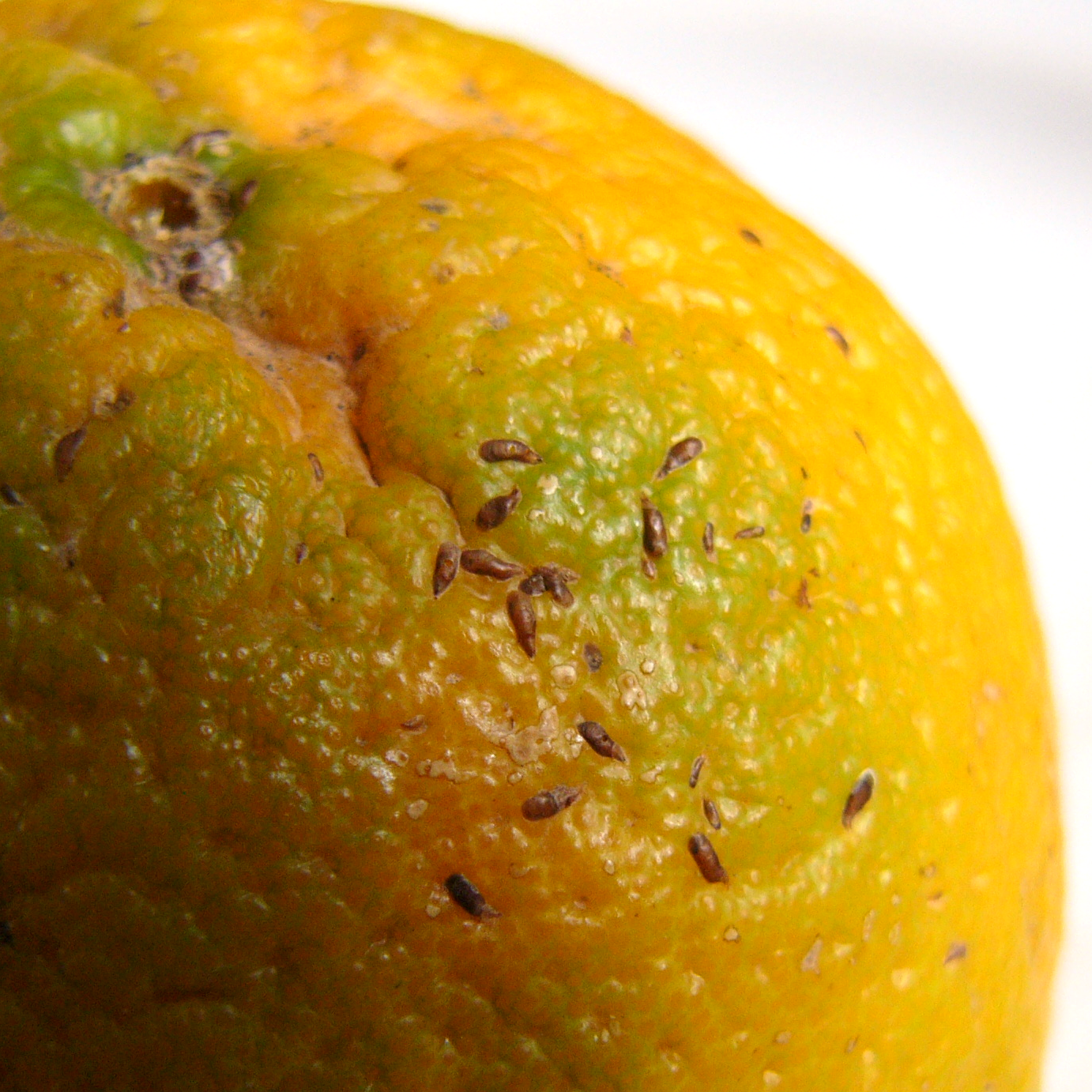
Lepidosaphes beckii on an orange fruit

These are usually Citrus host plant species such as sweet orange Citrus × sinensis.

== Predators ==
Predators of Lepidosaphes beckii include chalcid wasps from families Aphelinidae, Encyrtidae and Signiphoridae:

- Aphelinidae: Aphytis chrysomphali, Aphytis diaspidis, Aphytis holoxanthus, Aphytis lepidosaphes, Aphytis mytilaspidis, Encarsia citrina, Encarsia lounsburyi, Eretmocerus corni and Pteroptrix chinensis
- Encyrtidae: Adelencyrtus inglisiae, Metaphycus flavus and Ooencyrtus sp.
- Signiphoridae: Signiphora flavopalliata and Signiphora merceti
