= Lepidosaphes newsteadi =

Scientific classification
- Domain: Eukaryota
- Kingdom: Animalia
- Phylum: Arthropoda
- Class: Insecta
- Order: Hemiptera
- Suborder: Sternorrhyncha
- Family: Diaspididae
- Genus: Lepidosaphes
- Species: L. newsteadi

Binomial name
- Lepidosaphes newsteadi (Šulc, 1895)

Synonyms
- Insulaspis newsteadi Borchsenius, 1963; Mytilaspis newsteadi Šulc, 1895; Mytilaspis newsteadi Lindinger, 1907; Lepidosaphes newsteadi Fernald, 1903; Leucaspis newsteadi Soria et al., 2000; Mytilococcus newsteadi Lindinger, 1936

Species of true bug

Lepidosaphes newsteadi is a scale insect species in the family Diaspididae that was first described in 1895.

== Range ==
Lepidosaphes newsteadi is widespread in central and western Europe, Lebanon, and Turkey.

It was introduced accidentally into North America and Bermuda.

== Bermuda cedar ==
After being introduced to Bermuda during World War II, it nearly caused the extinction of the native Bermuda cedar.
