= Cyrus Thomas =

American entomologist (1825–1910)

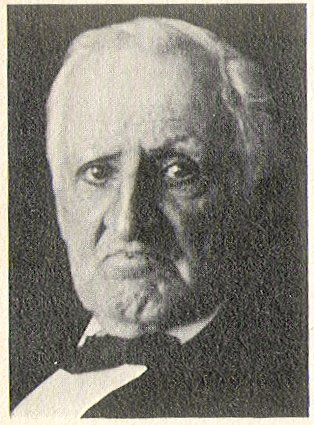
Cyrus Thomas

Cyrus Thomas (July 27, 1825 – June 26, 1910) was an American ethnologist and entomologist prominent in the late 19th century and noted for his studies of the natural history of the American West.

== Biography ==
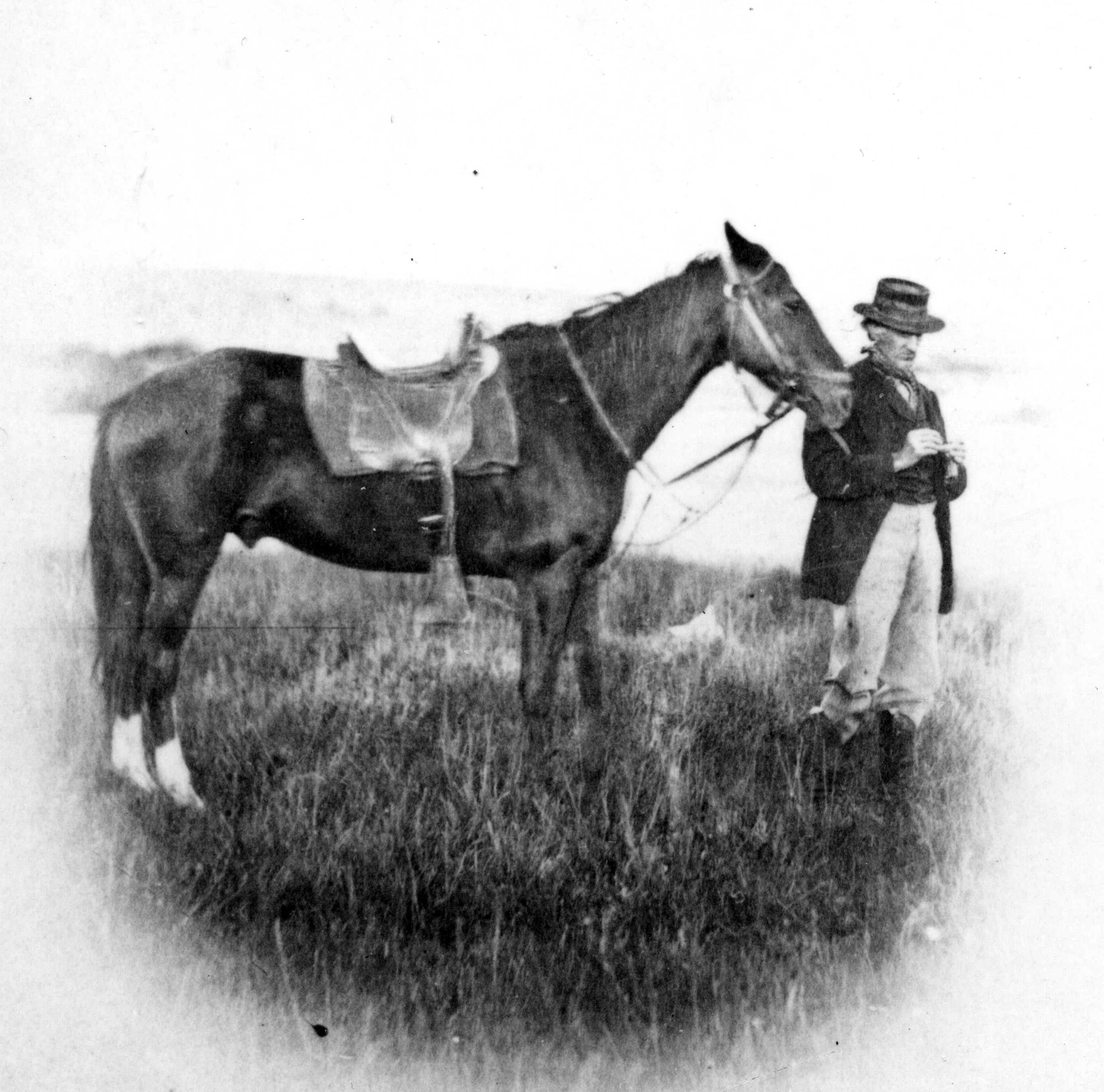
Cyrus Thomas - During 1870 Hayden survey

Thomas was born in Kingsport, Tennessee, on July 27, 1825, and was of German and Irish descent. He was educated in village schools in the Kingsport area and an academy student at Jonesboro, Tennessee, as well as being self-educated. His mother hoped he would join the medical field, so he studied anatomy and physiology, but he was uninterested in medicine and took to the study of law. He was admitted to the Illinois bar in 1851 and practiced in Murphysboro. Between his study of medicine and law his father-in-law, Dr. John Logan, appointed him to a county seat to "take charge of some business".

From 1851 to 1854 Thomas served as county clerk of Jackson County, Illinois. He later abandoned the practice of law, and in 1865 became superintendent of some Jackson County schools. This lasted only for a few years. Also during this time he entered the ministry of the Evangelical Lutheran Church, but was forced to abandon the ministry, as well, due to his "intense independent thought". Four years later in 1869 he joined the expedition of Ferdinand Vandeveer Hayden, who had organized a science corps for the exploration of the Rocky Mountains.

Thomas gained a strong interest in natural history, and in 1858 he founded the Illinois Natural History Society. In 1869 his professional scientific career began with his appointment as an assistant in entomology in the United States Geological and Geographical Survey of the Territories under Professor Ferdinand Vandeveer Hayden. Thomas was also the agricultural statistician and entomologist on the Hayden Geological Survey of 1871, whose work supported the creation of Yellowstone National Park in 1872.

In 1873 Thomas was appointed a professor of natural science at Southern Illinois Normal University, which gave him a public forum for his ideas. He was later named to the United States Entomological Commission in 1877 to serve alongside Charles Valentine Riley and Alpheus Spring Packard; at the same time he accepted the position of chief entomologist for the State of Illinois, where he succeeded William LeBaron. He kept his title of chief entomologist until 1882 after the commission came to an end in 1879. At this time, 1882, he was appointed archaeologist to the United States Bureau of American Ethnology.

Thomas was married twice, having lost his first wife, Dorthy Logan, sister of Maj. Gen.and later U.S. Senator John A. Logan. He remarried in 1865 to Viola L. Davis. With her, he fathered five girls and one boy, who died in infancy. Thomas died on June 26, 1910, and was buried in Frederick, Maryland.

== Works ==
=== Entomology ===
Thomas made some noteworthy contributions as an entomologist, having helped control the insect plague that was slowing the growth rate of the border states. Thomas, working with Charles V. Riley, found that the Hessian fly, which was terrorizing the wheat and rye of the western states, was most destructive in wet seasons and least destructive in dry seasons. With this information they were able to predict the outbreaks rather accurately for the upcoming year, and entomologists and farmers worked together for better times to plant and harvest.

The chinch bug was another culprit damaging crops. Thomas and LeBaron, using the same tactic of studying the chinch bug's relationship to the weather, found that chinch bugs needed at least one or two dry seasons to reach outbreak proportions. Thomas found a pattern between the chinch bug and weather, concluding that outbreaks can be expected about every seven years and then for two years in a row. After presenting his findings he accurately predicted an outbreak in 1881.

He also accompanied expeditions to the West as an entomologist—one of these being the Hayden Geological Survey of 1871. On this expedition Thomas addressed the problem of locusts with Riley and Packard (this was also the creation of the United States Entomological commission). During this investigation they found the locusts' breeding ground, how the weather affected them, and what controlled their direction-wind.

=== Archaeology ===
However, Thomas is best known for his work in archaeology and ethnology—specifically, his contributions to the question of the origin of the mound builders and Mayan hieroglyphics.

Thomas was not a field archaeologist. He visited the sites on which he reported, but did little if any field work. He had permanent and temporary field assistants and one clerical assistant. They provided him with their notes, which he organized, formed into a report, and published.

When Thomas began his investigations into the origins of the mound builders, he was under the impression that the mounds were made by a more advanced race that no longer existed. He argued that once America had been settled the people tended to stay in one place, which meant that the archaeological record had been produced by the same people of that area through history. Although he did not do field work he mapped out a plan of action for the mound excavations, and presented ten years of work in the 12th Annual Report of the Bureau of Ethnology for 1890–91. By the end of his research into the origin of the mound builders Thomas dismissed each argument advanced in favor of the vanished race theory. The Bat Creek Inscription was one artifact that Thomas used to support his hypothesis that "the Cherokee constructed many earthen mounds"; the evidence being that "the stone represented characters of Cherokee syllabary".

Thomas divided the mounds into a northern section, which was divided into six sections, and a southern section, which was divided into two. These eight sections, Thomas suggested, represent more than one nation. Thomas thought that migration was the reason for the mounds being spread through the east, but also recognized that the idea for mounds diffused through the different tribes.

=== Climatology ===
Thomas also wrote on climatology, a new field in the 19th century. He was a leading proponent of the now-debunked theory known as "rain follows the plow", which stated that increased population and cultivation of the Great Plains would render the land lush and fertile. This theory was used to promote expansion into the American West by persuading would-be settlers that the current lack of precipitation would not hinder their ability to engage in agriculture.

== Additional references ==
- Forbes, S. A. (1910). "Obituary, Dr. Cyrus Thomas". Journal of Economic Entomology. 3 (4): 383–4. doi:10.1093/jee/3.4.383.
- Mallis, Arnold (1971). American Entomologists. Rutgers University Press. pp. 50–52. ISBN 9780813506869.
- Muller, Jon (1996). "Cyrus Thomas, 19th Century Synthesis and Antithesis". SIU Department of Anthropology. Southern Illinois University. Archived from the original on 2014-07-14.
- Sorensen, W. Conner (1995). Brethren of the Net, American Entomology, 1840-1880. Alabama University Press.
