= Odonaspidini =

Scientific classification
- Domain: Eukaryota
- Kingdom: Animalia
- Phylum: Arthropoda
- Class: Insecta
- Order: Hemiptera
- Suborder: Sternorrhyncha
- Family: Diaspididae
- Subfamily: Aspidiotinae
- Tribe: Odonaspidini; Ferris

Tribe of true bugs

Odonaspidini is a tribe in the armored scale insect family Diaspididae.

== Genera ==
These five genera belong to the tribe Odonaspidini:

- Batarasa Takagi, 2009 (Philippines, Turkey)
- Circulaspis MacGillivray, 1921 (North America, south Asia)
- Dicirculaspis Ben-Dov, 1988 (United States, Philippines)
- Froggattiella Leonardi, 1900 (widespread)
- Odonaspis Leonardi, 1897 (widespread)
