= Parlatoriina =

Scientific classification
- Domain: Eukaryota
- Kingdom: Animalia
- Phylum: Arthropoda
- Class: Insecta
- Order: Hemiptera
- Suborder: Sternorrhyncha
- Family: Diaspididae
- Tribe: Parlatoriini
- Subtribe: Parlatoriina

Subtribe of true bugs

Parlatoriina is a subtribe of armored scale insects.

== Genera ==
- Archangelskaia
- Madaparlaspis
- Parlatoria
- Syngenaspis
