= Benjamin Dann Walsh =

American entomologist (1808–1869)

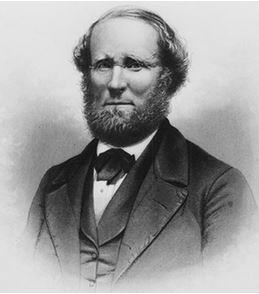
- Benjamin Dann Walsh
- Born: 21 September 1808; Hackney Middlesex, England
- Died: 18 November 1869 (aged 61); Rock Island, Illinois
- Scientific career
- Fields: Entomology
- Author abbrev. (zoology): Walsh

Benjamin Dann Walsh (September 21, 1808 – November 18, 1869) was an English-born American entomologist who served as the first official state entomologist in Illinois. He was a leading influence during a time of significant transition in American entomology. Walsh championed the application of scientific methods to control agricultural pests. He was a proponent of biological control as an effective means to manage insects. He was also one of the first American scientists to support Charles Darwin's theory of evolution and was instrumental in securing its broad acceptance in the entomological community.

== Biography ==
Walsh was born in Hackney, which was then a small village outside of London. The son of Benjamin Walsh and Mary Bidwell Clarke, he was the fifth of thirteen children. When Walsh was a boy, his father, a member of parliament, was charged with embezzlement and caught attempting to flee to America without his wife and children. He was jailed at Newgate and saved from hanging by a royal pardon issued in 1812.

After graduation from St. Paul's School in 1827, Walsh entered Trinity College, Cambridge, receiving a B.A. degree in 1831 and a master's degree three years later. In 1833 he became a fellow of Trinity, where he resided for 12 years with the intention of entering the Anglican ministry. A scholar of classic languages and literature, Walsh wrote The Comedies of Aristophanes, Translated into Corresponding English Metres (the first of an intended three volumes). In addition he showed an interest in journalism and wrote numerous articles for newspapers and periodicals.

While at Cambridge, Walsh developed a great dislike for religion and in particular came to despise the clergy as hypocrites and fools. He was also critical of university policies and wrote a pamphlet in 1837, A Historical Account of the University of Cambridge and its Colleges, proposing changes that were considered radical at the time. Eventually he became disillusioned with his career and left Cambridge.

Walsh married Rebecca Finn in 1838 and the couple emigrated to the United States. They settled in the remote and sparsely populated Henry County, Illinois, twenty miles from the nearest village. For the next twelve years, Walsh and his wife lived in a mud-plastered log cabin and farmed their 300-acre property. His desire to live the solitary life of a philosopher-farmer came to an end when new settlements in the region brought about an outbreak of malaria. Worried for his health, Walsh moved to Rock Island, Illinois, in 1850 and started a successful lumber business.

After his move to Little Rock, Walsh became active in politics. As a Radical Republican he was opposed to slavery and frequently expressed his strong opinions in print. He was actively involved in the fight to admit Kansas as a free state. In 1856 he helped to establish a local chapter of the Kansas Settlers Society which sought to encourage and support the settlement of Kansas by people who opposed slavery. In 1858 he suspected the Little Rock city council was embezzling city funds and in order to gain access to the financial records, he successfully campaigned for election to the council. Once the corruption was exposed he resigned his position.

== Entomology ==
Around 1858 Walsh sold his business and earned his living from a number of rental properties that he owned and managed. Although he had studied natural history and collected insects while at Cambridge, it was only at this point that he devoted himself full-time to entomology. By 1859 Walsh was lecturing on insects at the Illinois State Fair where he also displayed his collection of 1,650 insects he had recently collected. In 1860 Walsh delivered a very well-received lecture on insect pests to the Illinois State Horticultural Society. Later he wrote several articles for various farm periodicals. Initially, perhaps influenced by his own farming experience, Walsh focused on the practical aspects of insects as agricultural pests. However, starting in 1862 he published several scholarly papers in the journals of scientific societies such as the Boston Society of Natural History and the Entomological Society of Philadelphia. These works provided detailed observations of insect metamorphosis and natural history; compared morphological characters for a given taxon; or described new species.

In his new-found career as an entomologist, Walsh was an active participant in several scientific societies. In 1858 he became a founding member of the Illinois Natural History Society. In 1861 he was elected a corresponding member of the Entomological Society of Philadelphia, and in 1863 he became a member of the Boston Society of Natural History. Walsh was also closely affiliated with the influential Illinois State Agricultural Society. It was this organization that successfully lobbied the state legislature to appoint Walsh as the first Illinois State Entomologist. In 1868 Illinois became only the second state to appoint an official entomologist. Although his official appointment was not ratified by the legislature until nearly a year later, Walsh began work immediately.

In 1865 the Entomological Society of Philadelphia established a monthly periodical, the Practical Entomologist, the first American journal devoted to economic entomology. Walsh was appointed an associate editor and quickly became editor of the short-lived but influential publication. In September 1868 Walsh became senior editor of The American Entomologist, with C.V. Riley as junior editor. Targeting farmers, this monthly journal featured illustrations and clear descriptions to help readers identify insect pests and apply the most effective controls. Two significant findings by Walsh and Riley appeared in this journal: the discovery of the 13-year form of the periodical cicada, and the first reference to mimicry of the North American monarch butterfly by the viceroy.

== Darwinism ==
Walsh had been classmates with Charles Darwin at Cambridge and both received their baccalaureate degrees in 1831. Although not close friends, they were acquaintances, held a shared interest in natural history, and were mentored by two prominent Cambridge professors: geologist Adam Sedgwick and botanist John Henslow.

Walsh first read Darwin's On the Origin of Species in 1861. He had initially approached the book with skepticism but quickly became a convert to Darwin's theory and one of its most enthusiastic proponents. He later wrote to Darwin: "Allow me to take this opportunity of thanking you for the publication of your Origin of Species... The first perusal staggered me, the second convinced me, and the oftener I read it the more convinced I am of the general soundness of your theory." This was the first letter in what became a regular correspondence. Over the next several years more than 30 letters were exchanged between them.

Once Walsh became convinced of Darwin's theory, he championed the cause vigorously in the American scientific community through his lectures, publications and private correspondence. With Darwin's encouragement, he challenged the views of prominent opponents of evolution, including Louis Agassiz, Samuel Scudder, and Alpheus Packard. Within a few years, most entomologists (including Scudder and Packard) were expressing their support for evolutionary theory, while the remaining holdouts, like Agassiz, experienced a diminished reputation with their peers.

Walsh also incorporated evolutionary thinking into his own entomological studies and made several original contributions supporting Darwinism. In 1864 Walsh noted that 15 similar species of gall-inducing insects differed primarily in their preference for different species of willow. He went on to argue that these wasps shared a common ancestor that evolved into distinct species based on the species of willow they preferred. Walsh also investigated the phenomena of protective mimicry among insects and argued that it was best explained as an example of natural selection. Darwin was delighted to learn of Walsh's studies and incorporated his findings in later editions of the Origin of Species.

== Death ==
Walsh died on November 18, 1869, from injuries sustained when struck by a train while walking along the tracks. He is buried in the Chippiannock Cemetery, Rock Island. His insect collection, numbering 30,000 specimens, was purchased by the State of Illinois and stored in the "fireproof" facilities of the Chicago Academy of Sciences for safekeeping. Nevertheless, almost all of Walsh's collection was destroyed in the Great Chicago Fire of 1871. His position as state entomologist was replaced by William LeBaron.

== Publications ==
Walsh authored 385 works during his career and co-authored an additional 478 works with Charles V. Riley. Some of his more notable entomological works include:

- 1861. Insects injurious to vegetation in Illinois
- 1864. On dimorphism in the hymenopterous genus Cynips
- 1864. On certain entomological speculations of the New England school of naturalists
- 1865. On phytophagic varieties and phytophagic species, with remarks on the unity of coloration in insects
- 1866. Imported insects; the gooseberry saw-fly
- 1867. On the insects, coleopterous, hymenopterous, and dipterous, inhabiting the galls of certain species of willow
- 1867. First annual report on the noxious insects of the state of Illinois
- 1867. The apple-worm and the apple-maggot
- 1868. The periodical cicada (with Riley)
- 1869. Imitative butterflies (with Riley)
