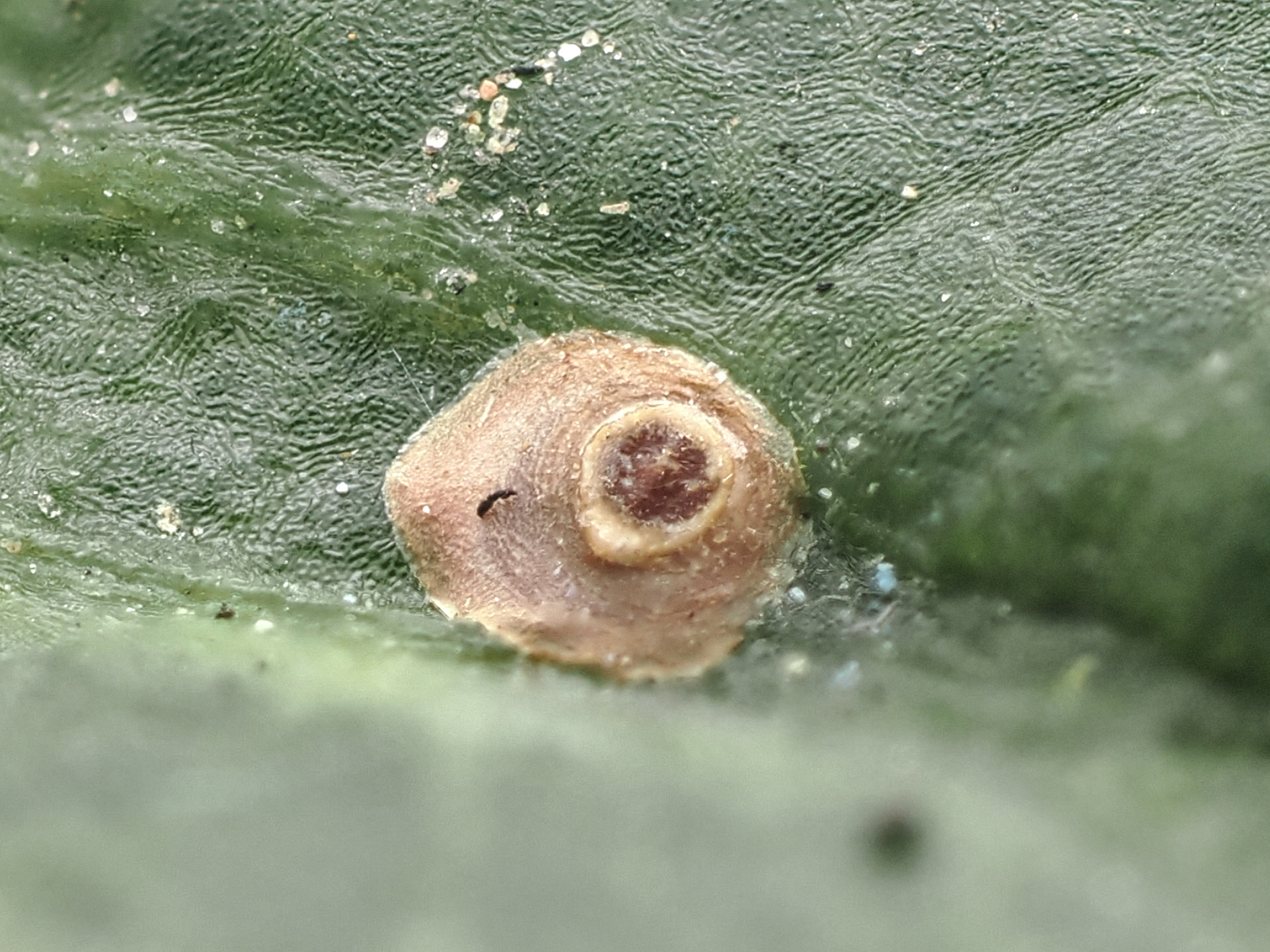
- Aonidia lauri, France

Scientific classification
- Domain: Eukaryota
- Kingdom: Animalia
- Phylum: Arthropoda
- Class: Insecta
- Order: Hemiptera
- Suborder: Sternorrhyncha
- Family: Diaspididae
- Subfamily: Aspidiotinae
- Tribe: Aonidiini; Targioni Tozzetti

= Aonidiini =

Tribe of scale insects

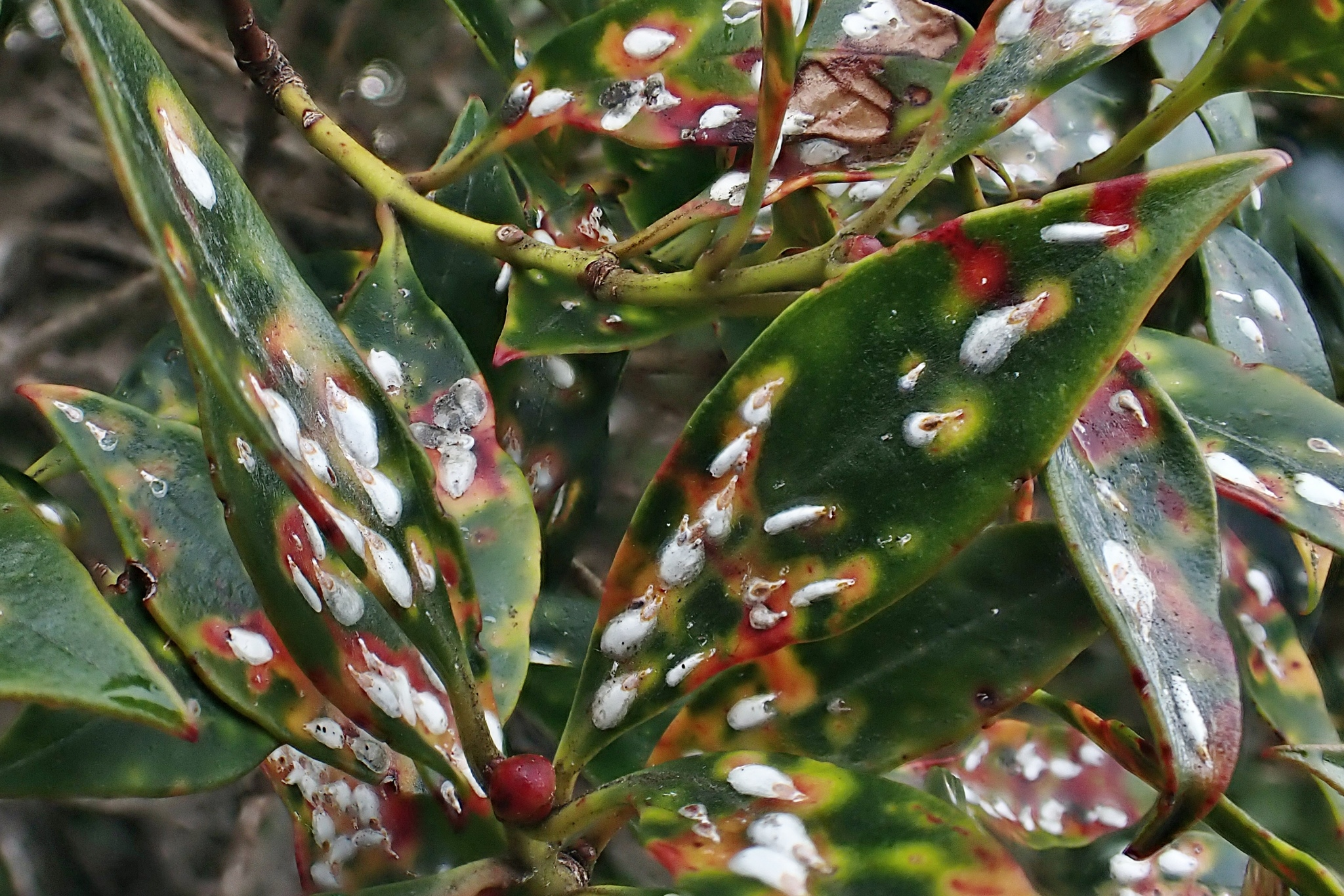
Anoplaspis metrosideri, New Zealand

Aonidiini is a tribe of armored scale insects in the family Diaspididae.

== Genera ==
The following genera are members of the tribe Aonidiini

- Achorophora Brimblecombe, 1957
- Acontonidia Brimblecombe, 1957
- Agrophaspis Borchsenius & Williams, 1963
- Alioides Brimblecombe, 1958
- Anoplaspis Leonardi, 1898
- Aonidia Targioni Tozzetti, 1868
- Aspidonymus Brimblecombe, 1957
- Brimblecombia Normark, 2019
- Diaphoraspis Brimblecombe, 1957
- Diaspidopus Brimblecombe, 1959
- Diastolaspis Brimblecombe, 1959
- Dichosoma Brimblecombe, 1957
- Duplaspidiotus MacGillivray, 1921
- Eugreeniella Brimblecombe, 1958
- Eulaingia Brimblecombe, 1958
- Fernaldanna MacGillivray, 1921
- Genaparlatoria MacGillivray, 1921
- Gomphaspidiotus Borchsenius & Williams, 1963
- Greeniella Cockerell, 1897
- Icaraspidiotus Takagi, 2000
- Loranthaspis Cockerell & Bueker, 1930
- Maskellia Fuller, 1897
- Mimeraspis Brimblecombe, 1957
- Myrtophila Brimblecombe, 1957
- Neoleonardia MacGillivray, 1921
- Neomorgania MacGillivray, 1921
- Paraonidia MacGillivray, 1921
- Parrottia MacGillivray, 1921
- Pentalaminaspis Smith-Pardo, Evans & Dooley, 2012
- Protomorgania Dooley & Evans, 2012
- Pseudaonidia Cockerell, 1897
- Pseudotargionia Lindinger, 1912
- Rhopalaspis Matile-Ferrero & Foldi, 2018
- Sadaotakagia Ben-Dov, 2003
- Semelaspidus MacGillivray, 1921
- Tsimanaspis Mamet, 1959
