= Illinois Museum of Natural History =

Museum in Illinois, 1858–1877

Coordinates: 40°30′35″N 88°59′29″W

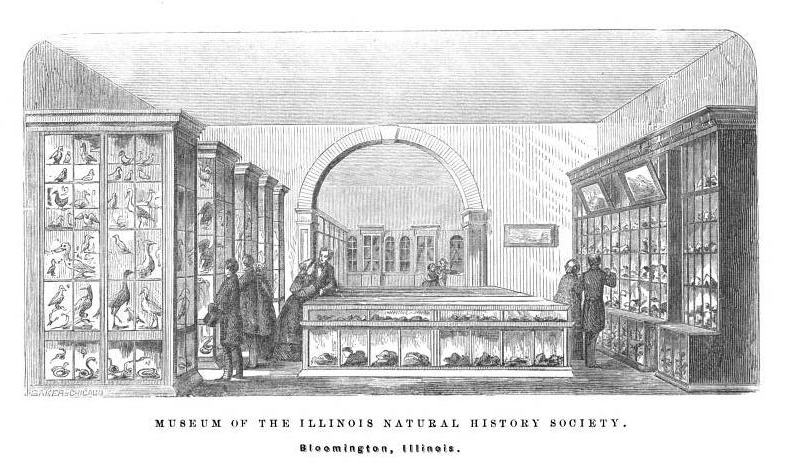
An engraving showing the interior of the Museum of Geology and Natural History located at the Illinois State Normal School

The Illinois Museum of Natural History was founded as the Museum of the Illinois State Natural History Society at the Illinois Normal School, Bloomington, Illinois, in 1858. The museum operated until 1877 on the third floor of what became Illinois State University Old Main building (which was razed in 1958).

== Early history ==
At the meeting of the Illinois State Teachers' Association in December, 1857 held at Decatur, Illinois, a paper was read by Cyrus Thomas of Carbondale, Jackson County suggesting the formation of a State Natural History Society and suggesting the State Normal School as its headquarters and the place for its museum. In accordance with this suggestion a meeting was called at the rooms of the Normal University in Bloomington on the 30th of June following when a plan of operations was agreed upon and officers elected of whom Professor J. B. Turner was elected president. Since that time two annual meetings were held and at each succeeding meeting the evidence of increasing interest was exhibited by increased numbers. Papers were presented by President J.B. Turner on "Microscopic Insects", by Dr. Frederick Brendel of Peoria, Illinois on "Forests or Forest Trees", etc. Following the original design of Cyrus Thomas, the Normal University building was planned with a large and beautiful hall one hundred feet by thirty three feet for the museum. Through the indefatigable exertions of Charles D. Wilber the agent of the society, and then its secretary, the collection made within the first two years amounted to nearly sixty thousand specimens. The library of the society was planned to embrace everything that could be procured by gift, purchase or exchange upon Natural History in particular and Science in general. The library began with three hundred volumes with Ira Moore as Librarian.

== Description ==
The State Normal University was made the depository for all collections in the various departments of Natural History under the auspices of the society and also for such collections as might be donated. For this purpose two large halls in the university building were united by an arch affording a spacious gallery one hundred feet in length and thirty three feet wide. This hall called the Museum of Geology and Natural History was built from plans furnished by Richard H. Holder of Bloomington who visited the Museums of the Philadelphia Academy of Sciences, the Boston Academy and the Salem Museum. The following is a brief outline of the plan adopted. Arranged along the floor in front near the windows were twelve glass structures each four feet by eight feet and ten feet high furnished with shelves and bases for the department of Ornithology. In these structures of pure French glass the birds were arranged in families each with its name and habitat. At first they are chiefly occupied by the Birds of Illinois. Across an aisle four feet in width were placed twelve structures made also of plate glass corresponding with the structures for Birds. These were in the form of parallelograms each three feet by twelve feet and surmounted by a glass show case of the same dimensions and eight inches in depth. In the lower spaces were placed specimens of coal fossil flora such as Lepidodendra Sigillaria etc. which were too large for shelves.

== Notable members ==
- Richard Edwards (educator), in 1862, he joined the Illinois Natural History Society and the Illinois State Teachers' Association.
- Stephen Alfred Forbes, the first chief of the Illinois Natural History Survey.
- John Wesley Powell, educator and explorer, was involved with the growth of the museum and served as curator.
- Almon Harris Thompson, appointed acting curator in 1869.
- George Vasey, founding member.

== See also ==
- List of museums in Illinois
