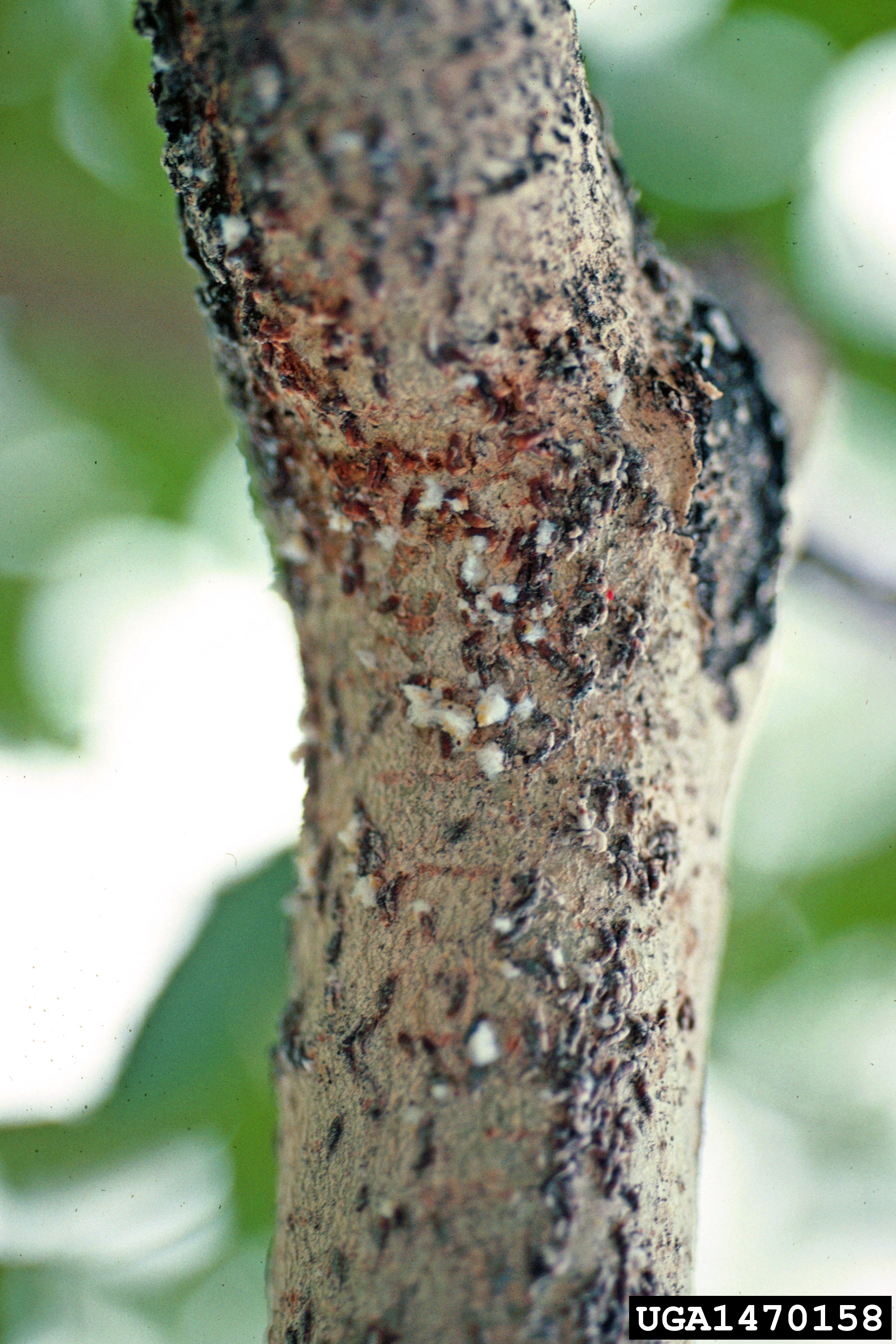
- Lepidosaphes ulmi (Oystershell scale) on tree — an introduced pest insect. At Rock Corral Campground in Milford, Utah, the Western United States

Scientific classification
- Kingdom: Animalia
- Phylum: Arthropoda
- Class: Insecta
- Order: Hemiptera
- Suborder: Sternorrhyncha
- Family: Diaspididae
- Subtribe: Lepidosaphidina
- Genus: Lepidosaphes; Shimer, 1868

Synonyms
- Triaspis

= Lepidosaphes =

Genus of true bugs

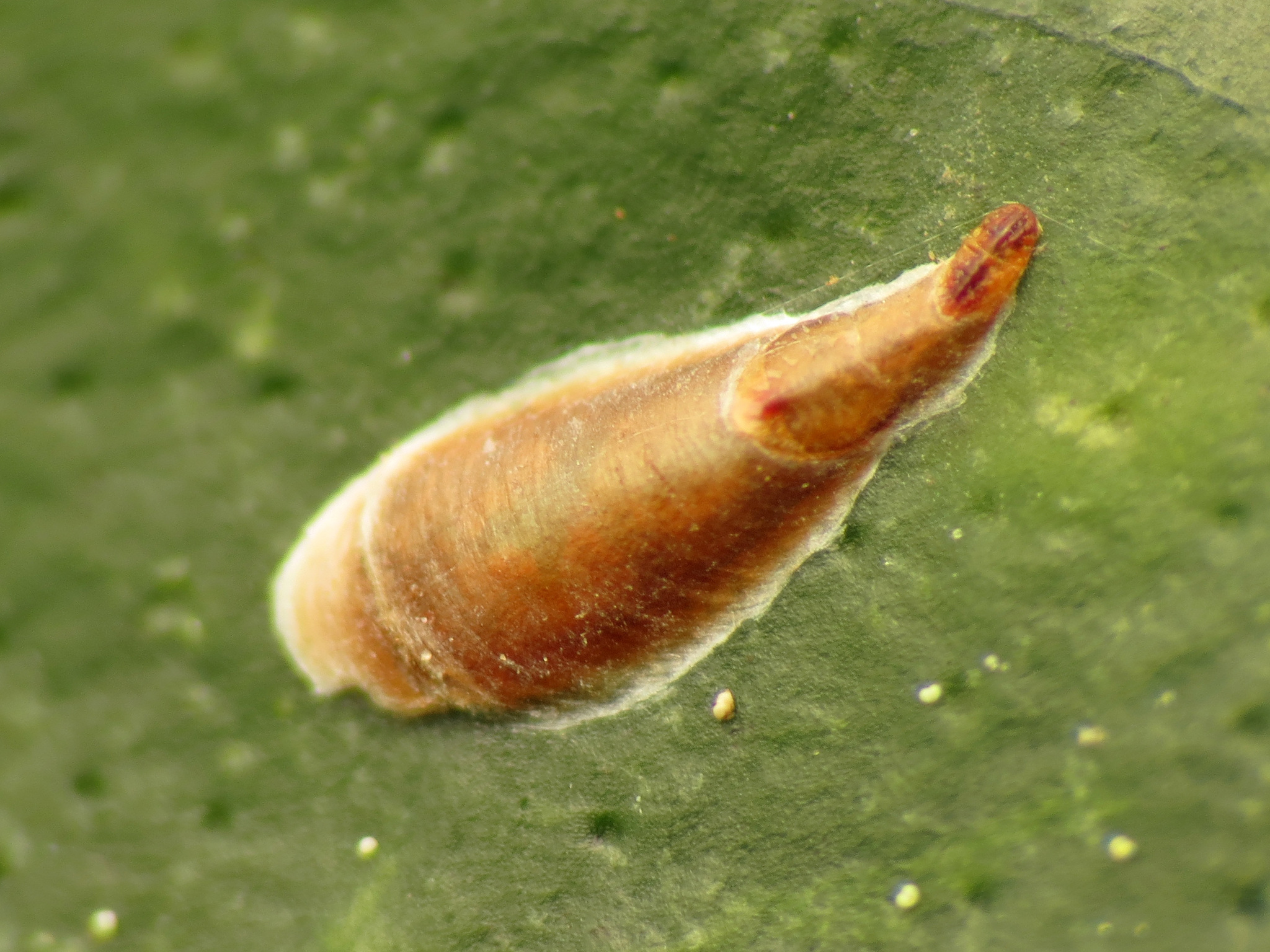
Lepidosaphes beckii, Spain

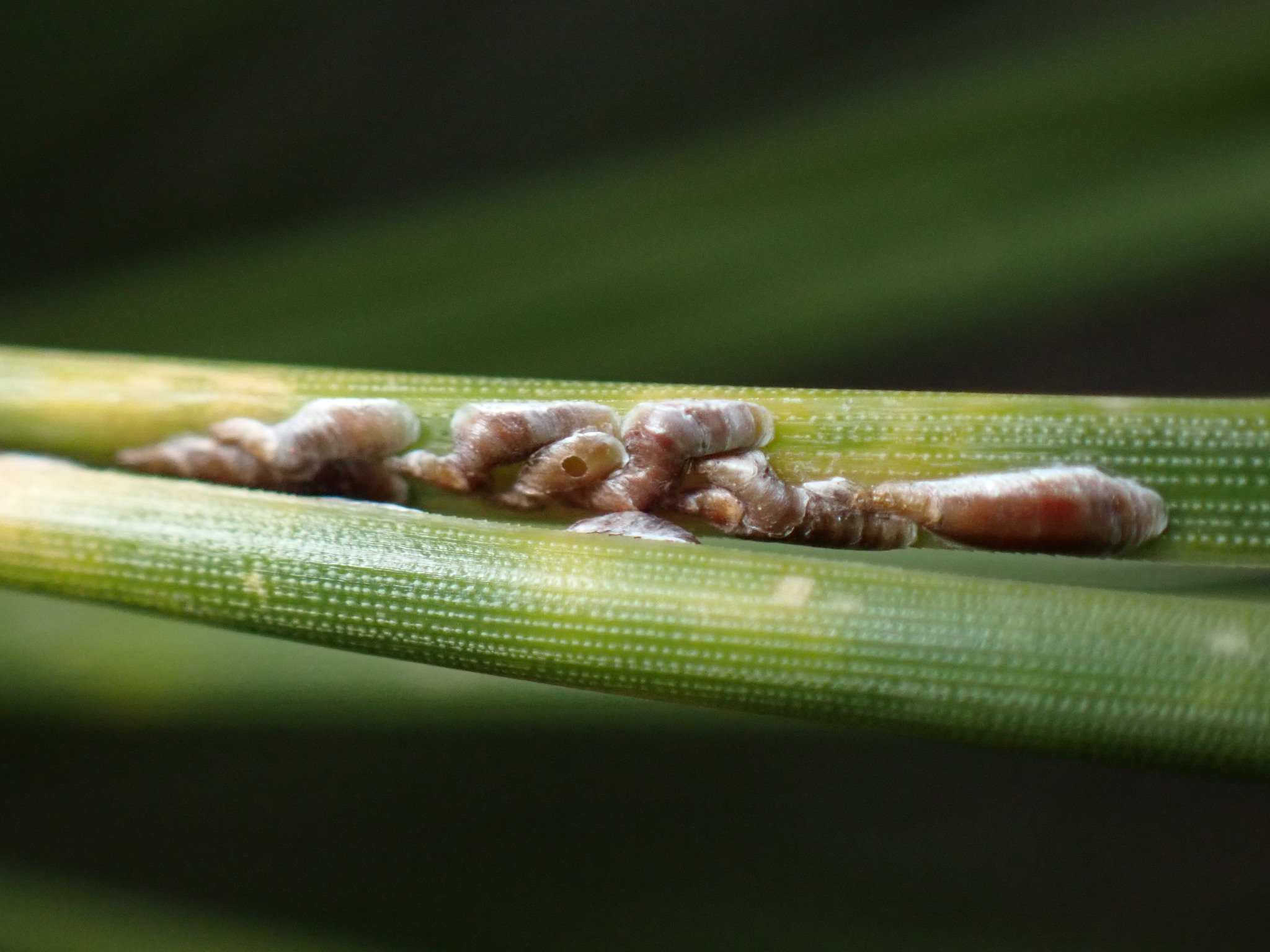
Lepidosaphes pini, New Jersey

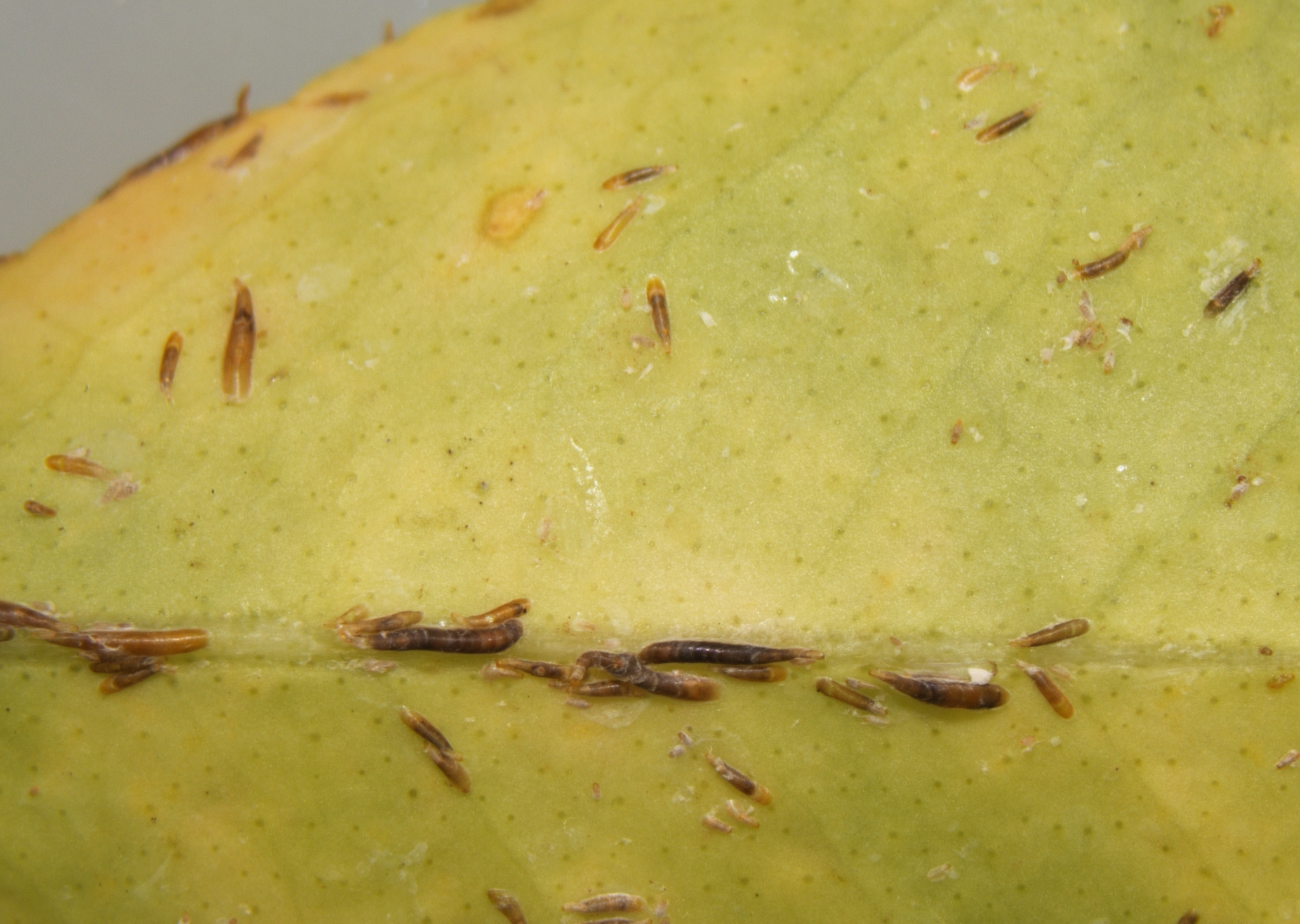
Lepidosaphes gloverii, Cook Islands

Lepidosaphes is a genus of armored scale insects in the family Diaspididae. There are at least 190 described species in Lepidosaphes, found worldwide.

== Species ==
These 191 species belong to the genus Lepidosaphes:

- Lepidosaphes abdominalis Takagi, 1960
- Lepidosaphes aberrans Lindinger, 1909
- Lepidosaphes abietis (Signoret, 1870)
- Lepidosaphes afganensis Borchsenius, 1962
- Lepidosaphes agalegae (Mamet, 1974)
- Lepidosaphes alnicola (Borchsenius, 1978)
- Lepidosaphes ambigua Rutherford, 1914
- Lepidosaphes antakaranae Mamet, 1959
- Lepidosaphes antidesmae (Rao, 1952)
- Lepidosaphes araucariae Beardsley, 1965
- Lepidosaphes arcana (Matile-Ferrero, 1988)
- Lepidosaphes australis Borchsenius, 1966
- Lepidosaphes beckii (Newman, 1869) (Machilus oystershell)
- Lepidosaphes belutchistana Balachowsky, 1954
- Lepidosaphes betulae (Borchsenius, 1967)
- Lepidosaphes boguschi McDaniel, 1972
- Lepidosaphes buzenensis (Kuwana, 1909)
- Lepidosaphes camelliae Hoke, 1921 (camellia parlatoria scale)
- Lepidosaphes carolinensis Beardsley, 1966
- Lepidosaphes cassiniae (Green, 1905)
- Lepidosaphes casuarinae (Maskell, 1893)
- Lepidosaphes celtis Kuwana, 1925
- Lepidosaphes ceodes Kawai, 1972
- Lepidosaphes chamaecyparidis Takagi & Kawai, 1966
- Lepidosaphes chinensis Chamberlin, 1925 (Chinese lepidosaphes scale)
- Lepidosaphes chitinosus Lindinger, 1909
- Lepidosaphes citricola (Young & Hu, 1981)
- Lepidosaphes citrina (Borchsenius, 1964) (Indian citrus scale)
- Lepidosaphes cocculi (Green, 1896) (cocculus scale)
- Lepidosaphes conchiformis (Gmelin, 1790) (Mediterranean fig scale)
- Lepidosaphes conocarpi (Takagi, 2003)
- Lepidosaphes contorta Laing, 1929
- Lepidosaphes coreana (Borchsenius, 1962)
- Lepidosaphes corni Takahashi, 1957
- Lepidosaphes cornuta Ramakrishna Ayyar, 1937 (betelvine scale insect)
- Lepidosaphes corrugata Green, 1904
- Lepidosaphes cortrioides (Froggatt, 1914)
- Lepidosaphes crassa (Froggatt, 1914)
- Lepidosaphes crataegicola Savescu, 1985
- Lepidosaphes crawi (Cockerell, 1896)
- Lepidosaphes crudiae Lindinger, 1909
- Lepidosaphes cupressi Borchsenius, 1958
- Lepidosaphes cycadicola Kuwana, 1931
- Lepidosaphes daphniphylli (Borchsenius, 1978)
- Lepidosaphes defecta (Maskell, 1897)
- Lepidosaphes diaspidiformis Malenotti, 1916
- Lepidosaphes dorsalis Takagi & Kawai, 1966
- Lepidosaphes duponti Green, 1916 (Dupont scale)
- Lepidosaphes elmerrilleae Williams & Watson, 1988
- Lepidosaphes erythrinae Rutherford, 1914
- Lepidosaphes esakii Takahashi, 1939 (Dupont scale)
- Lepidosaphes eucalypti (Froggatt, 1914) (eucalyptus mussel scale)
- Lepidosaphes europae Mamet, 1956
- Lepidosaphes euryae (Kuwana, 1902)
- Lepidosaphes eurychlidonis Williams & Watson, 1988
- Lepidosaphes ficicola Takahashi, 1931
- Lepidosaphes flava (Signoret, 1870) (De Stefan scale)
- Lepidosaphes froggatti Laing, 1929
- Lepidosaphes fulleri Fernald, 1903
- Lepidosaphes garambiensis Takahashi, 1933
- Lepidosaphes garciniae (Young & Hu, 1981)
- Lepidosaphes geniostomae Williams & Watson, 1988
- Lepidosaphes giffardi (Adachi & Fullaway, 1953)
- Lepidosaphes glaucae Takahashi, 1932
- Lepidosaphes gloverii (Packard, 1869) (Glover scale)
- Lepidosaphes granati Koroneos, 1934 (dzhid comma armored scale)
- Lepidosaphes grisea (Maskell, 1890)
- Lepidosaphes huangyangensis (Young & Hu, 1981)
- Lepidosaphes huyoung Normark, 2019
- Lepidosaphes incisor Green, 1916
- Lepidosaphes indica (Borchsenius, 1967)
- Lepidosaphes ixorae Cockerell & Robinson, 1915 (santan scale)
- Lepidosaphes janguai Balachowsky, 1954
- Lepidosaphes japonica (Kuwana, 1902) (Kusamaki scale)
- Lepidosaphes jingdongensis (Young & Hu, 1981)
- Lepidosaphes juniperi Lindinger, 1912 (juniper comma scale)
- Lepidosaphes junipericola (Tang, 1986)
- Lepidosaphes kamakurensis Kuwana, 1925
- Lepidosaphes kamerunensis Lindinger, 1909
- Lepidosaphes karkarica Williams & Watson, 1988
- Lepidosaphes kashicola Takahashi, 1957
- Lepidosaphes kazimiae (Williams, 1963)
- Lepidosaphes keteleeriae Ferris, 1953
- Lepidosaphes kuwacola Kuwana, 1925
- Lepidosaphes lactea (Maskell, 1895)
- Lepidosaphes lasianthi (Green, 1900)
- Lepidosaphes laterochitinosa Green, 1925
- Lepidosaphes laurentina (Almeida, 1971)
- Lepidosaphes leei Takagi, 1970
- Lepidosaphes lidgetti (Cockerell, 1899)
- Lepidosaphes lithocarpi Takahashi, 1934
- Lepidosaphes lithocarpicola (Tang, 1986)
- Lepidosaphes lobulata (Froggatt, 1914)
- Lepidosaphes luzonica Robinson, 1917 (Luzon scale)
- Lepidosaphes maai (Williams & Watson, 1988)
- Lepidosaphes macadamiae Williams, 1973
- Lepidosaphes macella Williams, 1973
- Lepidosaphes mackieana McKenzie, 1943
- Lepidosaphes madagascariensis (Mamet, 1950)
- Lepidosaphes malicola Borchsenius, 1947 (Armenian comma hard scale)
- Lepidosaphes marginalis Leonardi, 1914
- Lepidosaphes marginata Ferris, 1935
- Lepidosaphes mcgregori Banks, 1906 (McGregor scale)
- Lepidosaphes melaleucae (Maskell, 1896)
- Lepidosaphes meliae (Tang, 1986)
- Lepidosaphes meridionalis Lindinger, 1909
- Lepidosaphes mexicana (Cockerell, 1898)
- Lepidosaphes micronesiensis Takahashi, 1942
- Lepidosaphes micropori (Borchsenius, 1958)
- Lepidosaphes morafenobensis Mamet, 1959
- Lepidosaphes mulgae (Froggatt, 1914)
- Lepidosaphes multipora (Leonardi, 1903)
- Lepidosaphes newsteadi (Šulc, 1895) (Newstead scale)
- Lepidosaphes nivalis Takagi, 1970
- Lepidosaphes novozealandica Green, 1929
- Lepidosaphes noxia McKenzie, 1946 (noxius scale)
- Lepidosaphes ocellata (Green, 1907)
- Lepidosaphes ogasawarensis Kawai, 1972
- Lepidosaphes okitsuensis Kuwana, 1925 (Japanese silver fir scale)
- Lepidosaphes olivina Leonardi, 1913
- Lepidosaphes orsomi Mamet, 1954
- Lepidosaphes palauensis Beardsley, 1966
- Lepidosaphes pallens (Maskell, 1890)
- Lepidosaphes pallida (Maskell, 1895) (Maskell scale)
- Lepidosaphes pallidula (Williams, 1969) (Maskell scale)
- Lepidosaphes pandani Laing, 1929
- Lepidosaphes pauliani Mamet, 1959
- Lepidosaphes perlonga (Cockerell, 1898)
- Lepidosaphes piceae (Tang, 1986)
- Lepidosaphes pinea (Borchsenius, 1964)
- Lepidosaphes pineti Borchsenius, 1958
- Lepidosaphes pini (Maskell, 1897) (Oriental pine scale)
- Lepidosaphes pinicolous Chen, 1937
- Lepidosaphes pinifolii (Borchsenius, 1964)
- Lepidosaphes piniphila Borchsenius, 1958
- Lepidosaphes piniroxburghii Takagi, 1975
- Lepidosaphes pinnaeformis (Bouché, 1851) (Machilus oystershell)
- Lepidosaphes piperis (Green, 1908)
- Lepidosaphes pistaciae Archangelskaya, 1930 (yellow pistachio scale)
- Lepidosaphes pitsikahitrae Mamet, 1959
- Lepidosaphes pitysophila (Takagi, 1970)
- Lepidosaphes pometiae Williams & Watson, 1988
- Lepidosaphes pseudogloverii (Borchsenius, 1964) (pseudo-rodshaped scale)
- Lepidosaphes pseudomachili (Borchsenius, 1964)
- Lepidosaphes pseudotsugae Takahashi, 1957
- Lepidosaphes punicae Laing, 1929
- Lepidosaphes pyrorum Tang, 1977
- Lepidosaphes quercicola (Borchsenius, 1967)
- Lepidosaphes recurrens (Takagi & Kawai, 1966)
- Lepidosaphes recurvata (Froggatt, 1914)
- Lepidosaphes rubrovittata Cockerell, 1905 (guava scale)
- Lepidosaphes salicina Borchsenius, 1958 (far eastern oystershell scale)
- Lepidosaphes schimae Kawai, 1972
- Lepidosaphes sciadopitysi McKenzie, 1955 (umbrella pine lepidosaphes)
- Lepidosaphes securicula Williams & Watson, 1988
- Lepidosaphes serrifrons (Leonardi, 1898)
- Lepidosaphes serrulata (Ganguli, 1957)
- Lepidosaphes shanxiensis Shi, 1990
- Lepidosaphes shikohabadensis Dutta, 1990
- Lepidosaphes similis Beardsley, 1975
- Lepidosaphes smilacis Takagi, 1960
- Lepidosaphes somalensis Malenotti, 1916
- Lepidosaphes spinosa (Fuller, 1899)
- Lepidosaphes stepta Williams & Watson, 1988
- Lepidosaphes subnivea Laing, 1929
- Lepidosaphes subspiculifera (Froggatt, 1914)
- Lepidosaphes szetchwanensis (Borchsenius, 1978)
- Lepidosaphes takahashii (Borchsenius, 1964) (Takahashi comma scale)
- Lepidosaphes takaoensis Takahashi, 1935
- Lepidosaphes tangi Tang, 1986
- Lepidosaphes tapiae Mamet, 1959
- Lepidosaphes tapleyi Williams, 1960 (guava long scale)
- Lepidosaphes tenuior Lindinger, 1909
- Lepidosaphes tokionis (Kuwana, 1902) (Croton Mussel Scale)
- Lepidosaphes towadensis Takagi & Kawai, 1966
- Lepidosaphes tritubulata Borchsenius, 1958
- Lepidosaphes tsugaedumosae Takagi, 1977
- Lepidosaphes tubulorum Ferris, 1921 (dark oystershell scale)
- Lepidosaphes turanica Archangelskaya, 1937 (dzhid comma armored scale)
- Lepidosaphes ulmi (Linnaeus, 1758) (Mediterranean fig scale)
- Lepidosaphes ungulata Green, 1905
- Lepidosaphes unicolor Banks, 1906 (buko scale)
- Lepidosaphes ussuriensis (Borchsenius, 1962) (dark oystershell scale)
- Lepidosaphes vermiculus Mamet, 1937 (elongate coconut scale)
- Lepidosaphes viticis (Takagi, 1970)
- Lepidosaphes xishuanbannae (Young & Hu, 1981)
- Lepidosaphes yamahoi Takahashi, 1935
- Lepidosaphes yanagicola Kuwana, 1925 (Euonymus Alatus scale)
- Lepidosaphes yoshimotoi Takagi, 1970
- Lepidosaphes yuanfeng Yuan & Feng, 2007
- Lepidosaphes zelkovae Takagi & Kawai, 1966
