= Gymnaspidini =

Scientific classification
- Domain: Eukaryota
- Kingdom: Animalia
- Phylum: Arthropoda
- Class: Insecta
- Order: Hemiptera
- Suborder: Sternorrhyncha
- Family: Diaspididae
- Subfamily: Aspidiotinae
- Tribe: Gymnaspidini; Balachowsky

Tribe of scale insects

Gymnaspidini is a tribe in the armored scale insect family Diaspididae. They are found in the Neotropics.

Gymnaspidini was elevated in rank from subtribe in Normark 2019, retaining only 3 of its ~16 genera.

== Genera ==
These three genera belong to the tribe Gymnaspidini:

- Gymnaspis Newstead, 1898
- Hemigymnaspis Lindinger 1943
- Lindingeria MacGillivray 1921
