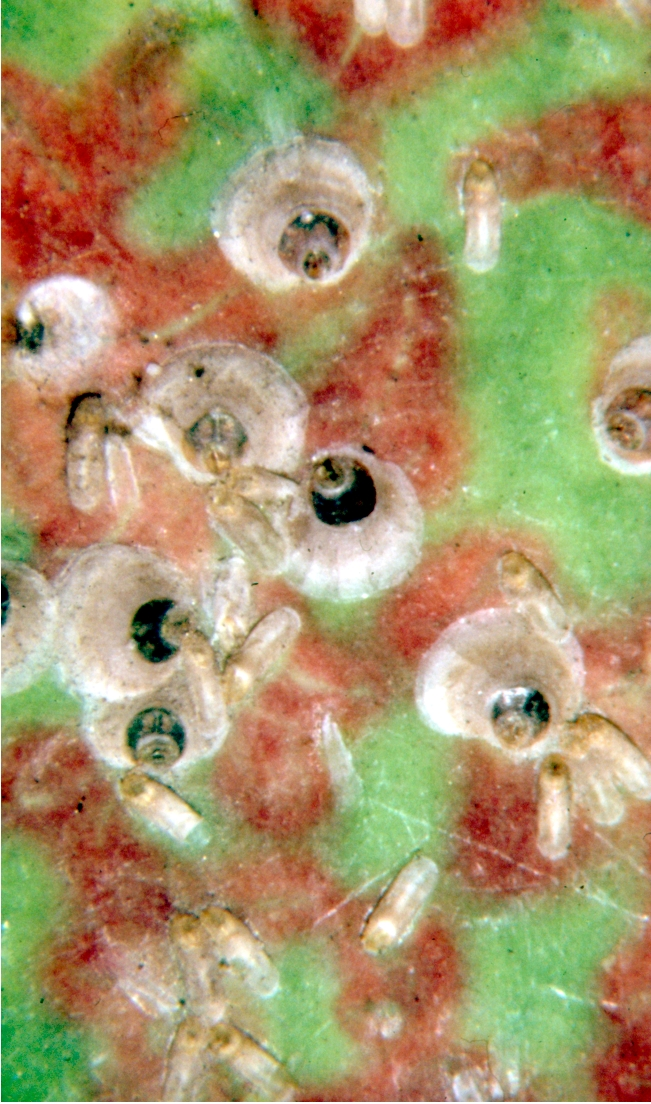

Scientific classification
- Kingdom: Animalia
- Phylum: Arthropoda
- Clade: Pancrustacea
- Class: Insecta
- Order: Hemiptera
- Suborder: Sternorrhyncha
- Family: Diaspididae
- Subfamily: Aspidiotinae
- Tribe: Parlatoriini; Leonardi

= Parlatoriini =

Tribe of scale insects

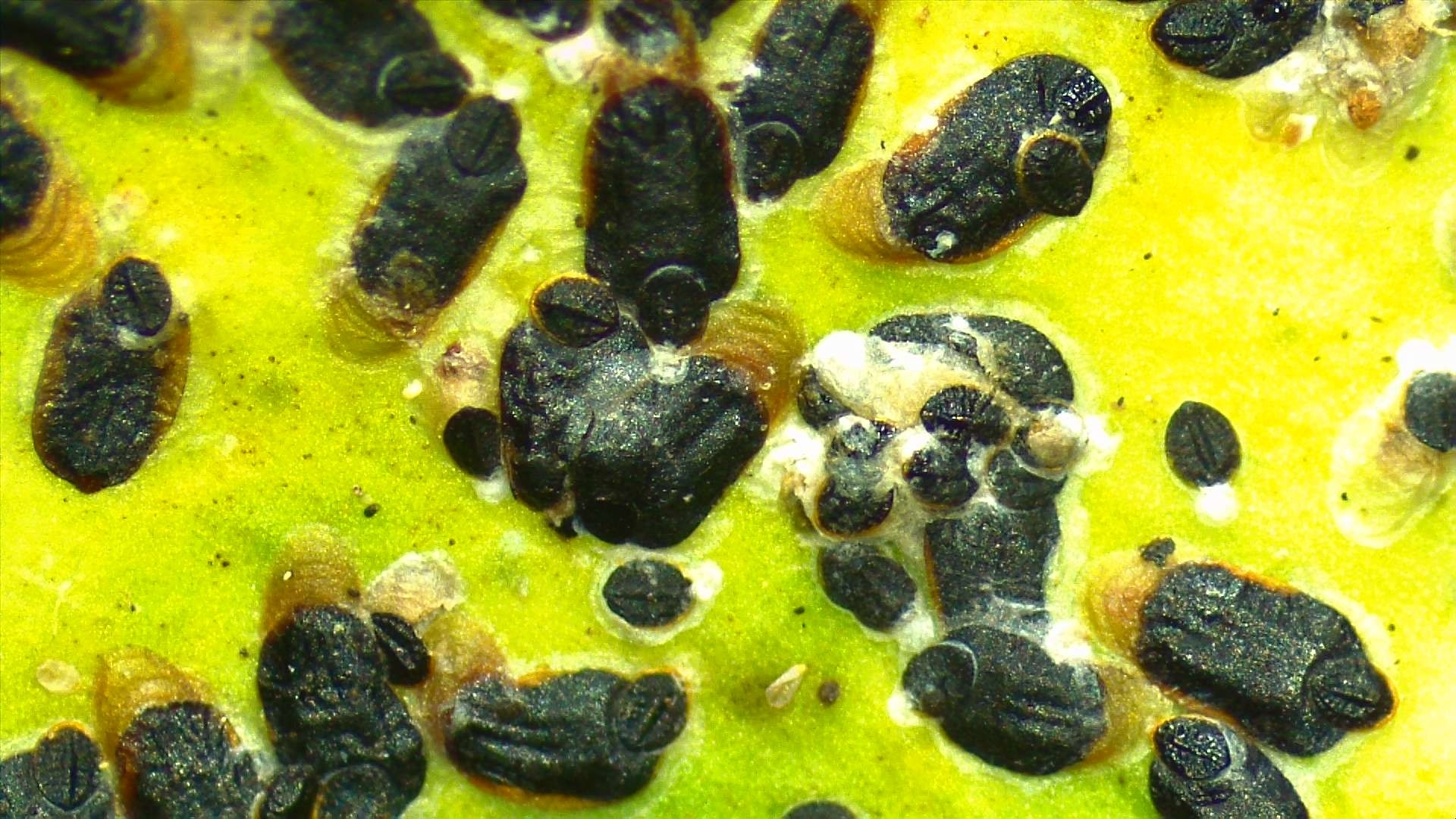
Parlatoria ziziphi, Guam

Parlatoriini is a tribe in the armored scale insect family Diaspididae. Takagi (2002) indicated that the Parlatoriini appear to be phylogenetically related to the Smilacicola and the Odonaspidini. Takagi went on to say about the tropical east Asian Parlatoriini that, The current classification of their genera may be largely tentative because the adult females are simple-featured and much modified owing to the pupillarial mode of life, and also because the second instar nymphs are generally similar among parlatoriines, whether the adult females are pupillarial or not. Andersen found that separating out pupillarial forms into a separate subtribe, Gymnaspidina, was counterproductive, as being non-dispositive.

Molecular analysis has shown that the Parlatoriini as traditionally constituted is highly non-monophyletic and that the genera, and occasionally species, are interdigitated with the Aspidiotini.

In 2019, Normark et al. published phylogenetic research on the family Diaspididae, reclassifying many of its tribes, subtribes, and genera.

== Genera ==
The following genera in are members of the tribe Parlatoriini.

- Aleucaspis Takagi, 1977
- Annonogena Takagi, 2008
- Arivonimaspis Mamet, 1962,
- Benaparlatoria Balachowsky, 1953
- Cryptoparlatoreopsis Borchsenius, 1947
- Doriopus Brimblecombe, 1960
- Kochummenaspis Takagi, 2003
- Leptaspis Hardy & Williams, 2018
- Ligaspis Takagi, 2002
- Mangaspis Takagi & Kondo, 1997
- Microparlatoria Takahashi, 1956
- Mixaspis Takahashi, 1932
- Neoleucaspis Green, 1926
- Neoparlatoria Takahashi, 1932
- Neparla Takagi, 1987
- Parlagena McKenzie, 1945
- Parlaspis McKenzie, 1945
- Parlatoreopsis Lindinger, 1912
- Parlatoria Targioni Tozzetti, 1868
- Porogymnaspis Green, 1916
- Proceraspis MacGillivray, 1921
- Radionaspis Ferris, 1942
- Silvestraspis Bellio, 1929
- Sishanaspis Ferris, 1952
- Tamilparla Takagi, 1987
