= Parlatoria ziziphi =

Scientific classification
- Domain: Eukaryota
- Kingdom: Animalia
- Phylum: Arthropoda
- Class: Insecta
- Order: Hemiptera
- Suborder: Sternorrhyncha
- Family: Diaspididae
- Genus: Parlatoria
- Species: P. ziziphi

Binomial name
- Parlatoria ziziphi (Lucas, 1853)

Species of true bug

Parlatoria ziziphi is a species of armored scale insect in the family Diaspididae.
