= Suturaspis =

Scientific classification
- Domain: Eukaryota
- Kingdom: Animalia
- Phylum: Arthropoda
- Class: Insecta
- Order: Hemiptera
- Suborder: Sternorrhyncha
- Family: Diaspididae
- Genus: Suturaspis

Genus of scale insect

Suturaspis is a genus of Diaspididae found in the Mediterranean region.

It inhabits plants such as almond trees, peach trees, and the Prunus webbii shrub.

It has been reported to have been infected by the Fusarium larvarum fungus, which acts as a biocontrol of the insect in Apulia, Italy.

== Species ==
- Suturaspis archangelskyae (Lindinger) 1929
- Sturaspis crataegi
- Suturaspis davatchi
