= Aphytis mytilaspidis =

Scientific classification
- Kingdom: Animalia
- Phylum: Arthropoda
- Class: Insecta
- Order: Hymenoptera
- Family: Aphelinidae
- Genus: Aphytis
- Species: A. mytilaspidis

Binomial name
- Aphytis mytilaspidis Le Baron, 1870

Synonyms
- Agonioneurus albidus; Aphytis diaspidioti; Aphytis variolosum

Species of wasp

Aphytis mytilaspidis is a species of chalcid wasp in the Aphelinidae family. The adults feed on scale insects and the larvae are ectoparasites of scales.

== Distribution ==
Aphytis mytilaspidis occurs in Europe and much of Asia, in South Africa, North America, Mexico, Argentina and Chile. It was first recorded in New Zealand in 1935.

== Description ==
The adult Aphytis mytilaspidis is yellowish-orange and about two millimetres long. It has transparent wings and two compound and three simple black eyes.

== Host species ==
Aphytis mytilaspidis parasitises a number of scale insects including Asterolecanium pustulans, Asterolecanium variolosum in the Asterolecaniidae family, Chloropulvinaria psidii and Pulvinaria psidii in the Coccidae family and many armoured scales in the Diaspididae family. In Serbia this species is an ectoparasitoid of Epidiaspis leperii, an armoured scale insect found on fruit trees.

== Biology ==
Aphytis mytilaspidis is a solitary wasp whose life history is closely linked to its host scale insects. The adult female feeds by piercing the scale with its ovipositor and then sucking out the juices with its feeding tube. Although Lepidosaphes ulmi seems to be the preferred host in New Zealand, this wasp has been reported as being the most common parasitoid attacking Quadraspidiotus ostreaeformis.

The adult female lands on a scale and palpates it several times with her antennae working from the centre towards the edge. She then thrusts her ovipositor through the scale and deposits an egg beside the soft body of the scale insect. The larva feeds on this and moults three times before becoming a prepupa. It is protected during this time by the scale and completely consumes the insect. After pupation, the adult wasp emerges through an oval hole in the scale. There are several generations of the wasp each year and it overwinters in the larval stage. The female can lay between thirty and sixty eggs during her lifetime.

Males are unknown in this species and the adults are all females. During reproduction, the eggs remain unfertilised and thus have half the number of chromosomes of a normal cell. It has been shown that diploidy is restored by terminal fusion. After the first stage of meiosis, the pronucleus fuses with its sister polar nucleus, thus restoring the correct number of chromosomes.

== Biological control ==
Aphytis mytilaspidis was introduced into Mauritius in 1983 in an attempt to control Melanaspis glomerata on sugar cane but did not become established. In California, this wasp has been used successfully to control fig scale (Lepidosaphes conchiformis). In Mediterranean areas it is used against oystershell scale (Lepidosaphes ulmi) and in many countries against pine needle scale (Phenacaspis pinifoliae) and aspidistra scale (Pinnaspis aspidistrae).
