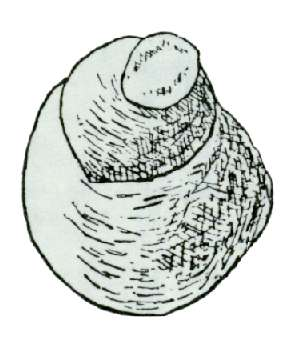
- Parlatoria pergandii from CSIRO

Scientific classification
- Domain: Eukaryota
- Kingdom: Animalia
- Phylum: Arthropoda
- Class: Insecta
- Order: Hemiptera
- Suborder: Sternorrhyncha
- Family: Diaspididae
- Genus: Parlatoria
- Species: P. pergandii

Binomial name
- Parlatoria pergandii Comstock, 1881

= Parlatoria pergandii =

Species of true bug

Parlatoria pergandii is a species of armored scale insect in the family Diaspididae.
