= Lepidosaphes gloverii =

Scientific classification
- Domain: Eukaryota
- Kingdom: Animalia
- Phylum: Arthropoda
- Class: Insecta
- Order: Hemiptera
- Suborder: Sternorrhyncha
- Family: Diaspididae
- Genus: Lepidosaphes
- Species: L. gloverii

Binomial name
- Lepidosaphes gloverii (Packard, 1869)

Species of true bug

Lepidosaphes gloverii is a species of armored scale insect in the family Diaspididae.
