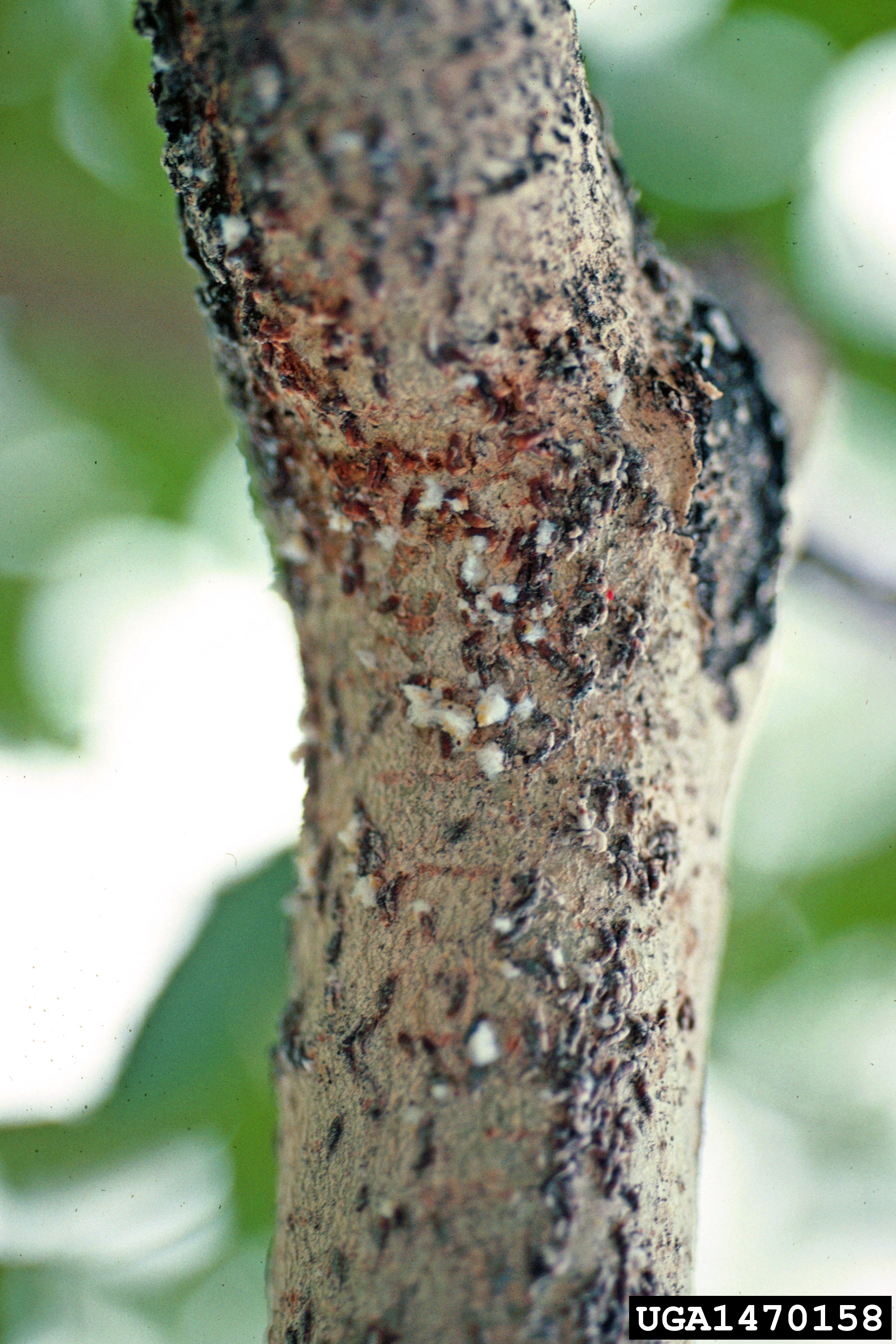

Scientific classification
- Kingdom: Animalia
- Phylum: Arthropoda
- Class: Insecta
- Order: Hemiptera
- Suborder: Sternorrhyncha
- Family: Diaspididae
- Genus: Lepidosaphes
- Species: L. ulmi

Binomial name
- Lepidosaphes ulmi (Linnaeus, 1758)

= Lepidosaphes ulmi =

Apple mussel scale

Species of true bug

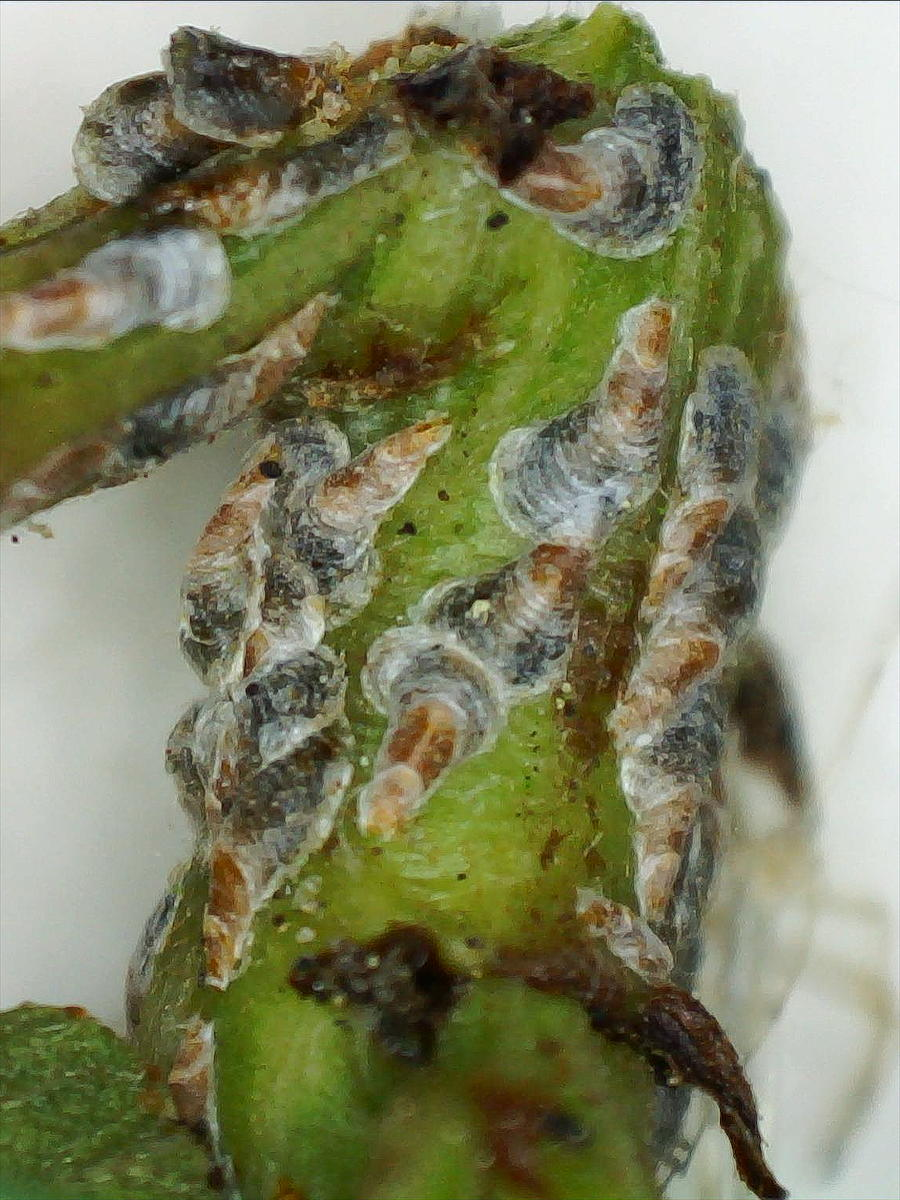
Lepidosaphes ulmi on Ceanothus in England

Lepidosaphes ulmi also known as apple mussel scale or oystershell scale is a widely invasive scale insect that is a pest of trees and woody plants. The small insects attach themselves to bark and cause injury by sucking the tree's sap; this metabolic drain on the plant may kill a branch or the entire tree.

== Biology ==
The adult female oystershell scale is up to four millimetres long, elongated, tapering to a point at the posterior end and often slightly curved, somewhat resembling a mussel shell. The upper side is a banded, brown, waxy scale and the underside is cream coloured. There are no eyes or legs and the short antennae have only a single segment. The mandibles are lengthened into a stylet adapted for sucking sap. The female lays about one hundred oval white eggs, retaining them under her body, and then dies. Her scale darkens in colour and stays in place, protecting the eggs over the winter. They can survive temperatures as low as -32 °C. They hatch in the spring at about the time the host plant's buds are bursting. The crawlers are tiny and disperse on the host, each one looking for a suitable protected site with thin bark in which to settle, remaining in that place permanently after sinking the stylet into the host plant's vascular tissues. The crawler moults twice before becoming an adult female, forming a protective scale from larval exuviae and secretions. Some crawlers may develop into males. These undergo four moults and the adult males have eyes, three pairs of legs, one pair of wings, a head and a body divided into a thorax and abdomen. Not all colonies produce males and bisexual and parthenogenetic populations are known.

== Host plants ==
Over one hundred and fifty host plant species are known for the oystershell scale including members of the families Aceraceae, Betulaceae, Caprifoliaceae, Celastraceae, Elaeagnaceae, Grossulariaceae, Hydrangeaceae, Juglandaceae, Oleaceae, Pyrolaceae, Rosaceae, Salicaceae and Tiliaceae. Apart from forest trees and ornamentals, the oystershell scale is a pest of apples, pears, plums, peaches, apricots, mulberries and currants. It infests trunks and branches and is also found on leaves. Heavy infestations can kill branches and even cause trees to die.

== Control ==
The crawlers are vulnerable to a number of pesticides but adult oystershell scales are protected by their waxy scales which repel water. Use of horticultural oils may overcome this problem but control is still difficult. In gardens, trunks and branches may be scrubbed and heavily infested wood pruned out and removed. In some parts of the world, populations are controlled to a certain extent by the oystershell scale parasitoid, Aphytis mytilaspidis and the ladybird Chilocorus bipustulatus.
