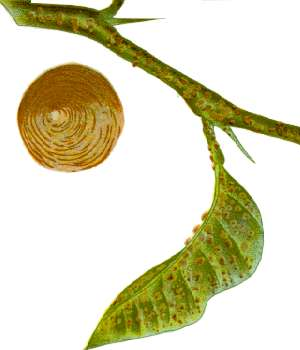
- Aspidiotus nerii oleander scale

Scientific classification
- Domain: Eukaryota
- Kingdom: Animalia
- Phylum: Arthropoda
- Class: Insecta
- Order: Hemiptera
- Suborder: Sternorrhyncha
- Family: Diaspididae
- Subfamily: Aspidiotinae

= Aspidiotinae =

Subfamily of true bugs

Aspidiotinae is a large subfamily of armored scale insects, with approximately 169 genera.

== Tribes ==
Aspidiotinae is made up of the following tribes:

- Aonidiini Balachowsky (Old World, mostly Australasian and Oriental, 36 genera)
- Aspidiotini Westwood (cosmopolitan, 88 genera)
- Gymnaspidini Balachowsky (Neotropical, 3 genera)
- Leucaspidini Atkinson (almost exclusively Old World, 11 genera)
- Odonaspidini Ferris (mostly Oriental, 5 genera)
- Parlatoriini Leonardi (mostly Oriental, 25 genera)
- Smilacicolini Takagi (Oriental, 1 genus)
