= Grease Your Hips =

Live album by Hole
- Released: January 22, 2016
- Recorded: November 9–December 9, 1994
- Studio: Hollywood Palladium (Hollywood, California); Berkeley Community Theatre (Berkeley, California)
- Genre: Alternative rock
- Length: 69:01
- Label: Let Them Eat Vinyl

Grease Your Hips is an unofficial live album by American alternative rock band Hole. The double album is composed of live radio broadcast performances by Hole in 1994 at the Hollywood Palladium and the Berkeley Community Theatre in Berkeley, California, in late 1994. It was released on vinyl on January 22, 2016.

== Background ==
The tracks on Grease Your Hips originate from radio broadcasts of two Hole shows in 1994; first at the Hollywood Palladium in November, and second at the Berkeley Community Theatre in December. The title of the record is derived from a lyric in the track "Gutless."

== Release ==
The album was released initially on iTunes by Good Ship Funke Records, a United Kingdom-based label, on May 4, 2015. It was released as a double LP on January 22, 2016, in the United Kingdom by Let Them Eat Vinyl, and on January 29 in North America.

== Track listing ==
No.	Title	Writer(s)	Length
1.	"Plump"	Courtney Love; Eric Erlandson	2:44
2.	"Beautiful Son"	Love; Erlandson; Patty Schemel	2:52
3.	"Miss World"	Love; Erlandson	3:04
4.	"Asking For It"	Love; Erlandson	4:56
5.	"Hungry Like the Wolf"	Duran Duran	1:41
6.	"Gutless"	Love; Erlandson	2:44
7.	"Softer, Softest"	Love; Erlandson	4:19
8.	"I Think That I Would Die"	Love; Erlandson	4:22
9.	"Credit in the Straight World"	Stuart Moxham	2:49
10.	"Teenage Whore"	Love; Erlandson; Caroline Rue; Jill Emery	2:37
11.	"Violet"	Love; Erlandson	5:06
12.	"Sugar Coma"	Love	1:17
13.	"Miss World / We Three Kings"	Love; Erlandson /; John Henry Hopkins, Jr.	4:21
14.	"Asking For It"	Love, Erlandson	5:24
15.	"He Hit Me (and It Felt like a Kiss) / Best Sunday Dress"	Carole King; Gerry Goffin /; Love; Kat Bjelland	3:42
16.	"Doll Parts"	Love	5:35
17.	"Violet"	Love; Erlandson	4:01
18.	"Olympia"	Love; Erlandson	3:42
19.	"Sugar Coma" (reprise)	Love	2:48
Total length:			69:01

*Note: Tracks 1–11 recorded at the Hollywood Palladium, November 9, 1994; Tracks 12–19 recorded at the Berkeley Community Theatre, December 9, 1994

== Personnel ==
- Courtney Love – lead vocals, rhythm guitar
- Eric Erlandson – lead guitar
- Melissa Auf der Maur – bass, backing vocals
- Patty Schemel – drums
