= My Body, the Hand Grenade =

1997 compilation album by Hole

Compilation album by Hole
- Released: October 28, 1997
- Recorded: 1990–1995
- Studios: Rudy's Rising Star (Los Angeles); Radio Tokyo (Los Angeles); Word of Mouth Productions (Seattle); Ariola Ltda BMG (Rio de Janeiro); Triclops Studios (Atlanta); Brooklyn Academy of Music (New York City); Brixton Academy (London); Little John's Farm (Reading, England)
- Genres: Alternative rock; noise rock
- Length: 55:52
- Label: City Slang
- Producer: Eric Erlandson

Hole chronology
The First Session (1997)	My Body, the Hand Grenade (1997)	Celebrity Skin (1998)

My Body, the Hand Grenade is the first and only compilation album by American alternative rock band Hole, released on October 28, 1997, through the band's European label, City Slang Records. It was also imported for sale in the United States, where it was released on December 10, 1997. The album was compiled with the intent of tracking the band's progression from their noise rock beginnings to the more melodic songwriting that appeared on their second album, Live Through This (1994).

Made up of various unreleased tracks, B-sides, and singles, the album contains tracks from the band's first recording session in March 1990, as well as recordings sourced from several live performances. As a result, the tracks feature various bassists and drummers from past lineups, including drummers Caroline Rue and Patty Schemel, and bassists Jill Emery and Kristen Pfaff. Frontwoman Courtney Love is also featured playing bass guitar on one of the tracks. The album is dedicated to Pfaff's memory.

Production and mixing of the album was done chiefly by the band's lead guitarist, Eric Erlandson, while Courtney Love designed the album art, which features portraits of, and images referencing, Marie Antoinette, Anne Boleyn, and Jayne Mansfield, with "decapitated women" being the cohesive theme. The album's title, also conceived by Love, references this as well, with the pulling of the trigger-pin in a hand grenade functioning as a symbol for a body being decapitated. The album received mixed to positive critical reception, with critics addressing the strengths of individual tracks but noting a lack of cohesion. In the United Kingdom, the album peaked at number 82 on the UK Albums Chart.

== Background and recording ==
My Body, the Hand Grenade is the first and only compilation album to be released by Hole. The liner notes also explain that the compilation was put together to document Hole's progression from the punk-influenced Pretty on the Inside (released in 1991) to their more restrained, alternative rock-based Live Through This (released in 1994). The album was dedicated to former Hole bassist Kristen Pfaff and Kurt Cobain, both of whom died in 1994.

The first four tracks on the album originate from the band's first studio sessions in a "Los Angeles basement" at Rudy's Rising Star studio, where they recorded "Retard Girl", along with the tracks "Phonebill Song", "Johnnie's in the Bathroom", and "Turpentine". These tracks were consolidated and released as an extended play in August 1997, titled The First Session. Additionally, numerous singles, including "Dicknail" and "Beautiful Son", and their respective b-sides appear on the album. Love, who was typically a guitarist, is featured playing bass on "20 Years in the Dakota", a B-side to "Beautiful Son" that Love wrote about Yoko Ono. "Old Age", an outtake from Live Through This, also appears on the record. A formerly unreleased demo version of "Miss World", recorded in Brazil by Love, drummer Patty Schemel, and Love's husband, Kurt Cobain, was also included. Cobain, though uncredited, plays bass on the track, which features Love on guitar and Schemel on drums.

A total of five live tracks appear on the album: "Softer, Softest", "He Hit Me (And It Felt Like a Kiss)" (a cover of The Crystals), and "Season of the Witch" (a Donovan cover) were all recorded from Hole's performance on MTV Unplugged at the Brooklyn Academy of Music on Valentine's Day 1995. "Drown Soda" and "Asking for It", were recorded at London's Brixton Academy and the Reading Festival on May 4 and August 25, 1995, respectively.

== Composition ==
The majority of the songs on the album are credited to Hole, although the official BMI website notes that most of the songs were written solely by Courtney Love and Eric Erlandson, except "Retard Girl", which was written by Love alone; "Old Age", co-written by Kurt Cobain with additional arrangements by Love, "Beautiful Son" and "20 Years In The Dakota", written by Love, Erlandson and Patty Schemel; and "Drown Soda", the only case on the album of a song credited to a full Hole line-up, which at the time of writing was, Love, Erlandson, Jill Emery and Caroline Rue.

As a compilation album, the composition of its songs spans across a period of six years, charting the evolution of the band's alternative rock sound. The opening tracks on the album, which are from the band's first recording session, exhibit the band's early style, noted for its abrasive guitar work (heavily influenced by noise rock, grindcore, and no wave music) and literate, aggressive lyrics, many of which mix derogatory language with cryptic and religious themes. In particular, "Retard Girl" is a narrative of a girl being abused and made fun of on a playground. "Turpentine", as well as "Retard Girl", feature historical and religious references as well: "Turpentine" features lyrics alluding to Christianity ("I know all you devils by your Christian names / And I know all you bitches by your Christian names", "Bless my body and bless my soul / Wrap it in turpentine"), while a line from "Retard Girl", which reads: "As shines the moon among the lesser fires", is directly referenced from Odes, a book of Latin poems by Roman poet Horace. (Note: "As shines the moon among the lesser fires" is an English translation of a lyric (Latin: velut inter ignis luna minors) from Horace's Book I of Odes, written c. 23 BC.)

"Burn Black" and "Dicknail" also feature aggressive language and themes alluding to child molestation and incest. "Beautiful Son", written and recorded in 1992, features a more mellow guitar riff, and its lyrics make references to crossdressing. Love said the songwriting process on the track was an attempt to "be a little dumber. I was always trying to write a very complex song without ever having learned to write an easy Beatles song," noted in a 1994 interview. "It just had a riff. It wasn't super smart but it sounded good and that's when I started learning things don't have to have lots and lots of notes. That the best songs are carried by simple lines and simple melodies." This illustrates the band's turning point from their noise rock beginnings to more mellow, accessible sounds.

The track "Old Age", whose organ intro was featured on the band's cover of "Credit In The Straight World" from Live Through This, was revealed to have originally written by Kurt Cobain; Love stated in a 1997 interview that "Old Age" was "partly someone else's composition. It's something somebody had a little bit of and I said 'let me have the rest of it' and I wrote this thing in it and tried to make it goth. I found it, wrote it, and recorded it the same night." It was later revealed that a version of the song was recorded by Nirvana during the Nevermind (1991) recording sessions, but Cobain threw the song out, later giving the melody to Love, who rearranged musical pieces and rewrote the lyrics. Two live cover versions were included on the album: "Season of the Witch" by Donovan, and "He Hit Me (And It Felt Like a Kiss)", which was written by Carole King and recorded by The Crystals in the 1960s. Love sarcastically referred to it as a "feminist anthem" in its introduction during MTV Unplugged in 1995.

== Release ==
The album was released October 28, 1997 in Europe through City Slang on compact disc, and received a standard vinyl LP pressing in Germany in conjunction with EFA distribution, as well as a limited edition pressing, featuring a gatefold cover and a promotional poster. The album was not released officially in the United States, although it was imported for sales in American retail stores and released December 10, 1997.

=== Reception ===
Professional ratings
Review scores
Source	Rating
AllMusic	3.5/5 stars
NME	5/10 stars
Spin	(positive)
Uncut	4/5 stars

My Body, the Hand Grenade debuted at number 82 on the UK Albums Chart on October 12, 1997, and entered the UK Indie Albums Chart at number 9. The following week, the album dropped to number 25, but remained in the Indie Top 50 for a third week from October 26 – November 1.

The album received mixed to positive reviews from music critics: MTV published a middling review of the album, writing: "Well, I didn't ask for Hole's new album, but I got it anyway. And you? What do you want in your ripped black fishnet stocking this Christmas season?" Stephen Thomas Erlewine of AllMusic gave the album 3.5 out of 5-star rating, but noted: "While the rarity value of this music certainly makes it interesting, the music itself is pretty average, with the dreck outweighing the good stuff."

Spin gave the album a positive review, calling it "A fairly scattered collection of singles, outtakes, live cuts, etc. that's totally worth it for four tracks that never made a proper album—"Retard Girl," "Burn Black," "Beautiful Son," and "Drown Soda." They're essential Love." Simon Williams of NME gave the album a middling five out of ten stars, writing that: "Courtney [Love] makes the astonishing leap from singing tipsily to sounding, frankly, completely drunk." Williams also characterized the album as "damned sloppy" in spite of his view that Hole "always had more class than any green-haired rock chick peers", comparing the band to L7 and Lunachicks. He concluded: "While this experience may well be tremendously cathartic for Courtney... it gives everyone else a headache."

== Packaging and artwork ==
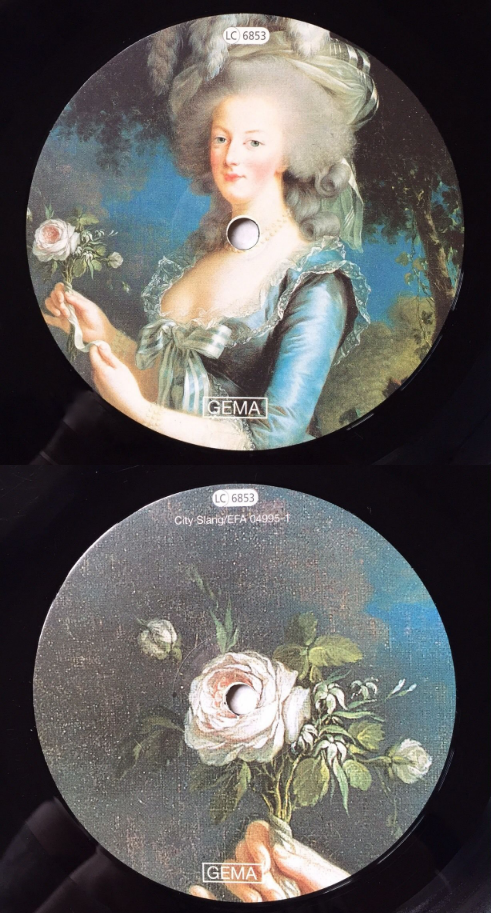
Front and back centerpieces of the vinyl, featuring Marie-Antoinette dit à la Rose (1783). (Note: Per Courtney Love's 1997 interview in the Melody Maker, the images featured in the album art depict and/or reference women who each were killed (or believed to be killed) by decapitation: Two different portraits of Anne Boleyn (unknown, c. 1533–36, NPG #688) and Marie Antoinette (Louise Élisabeth Vigée Le Brun, 1783) are featured, both of whom were executed by beheading.; A third image shows the wrecked car in which actress Jayne Mansfield died in 1967; the persistent rumor that Mansfield was decapitated in the accident went on to enter the cultural lexicon as an urban legend.)

The cover artwork for the album displays a dress worn by Love, while the back artwork of the LP depicts the neck and breast of Anne Boleyn, taken from a c. 1534 portrait. While the compact disc release of My Body, the Hand Grenade featured a solid black backdrop on the back cover, the LP depicts a portrait of Anne Boleyn, cropped at the neck. The interior art comprises publicity photos of the band, as well as a 1783 portrait of Marie Antoinette by Louise Élisabeth Vigée Le Brun, and a photo of the crushed car involved in the road accident that killed actress Jayne Mansfield. In an interview with Melody Maker in 1997, Courtney Love revealed the significance of the choice of artwork included in the album:

Interviewer: "The artwork shows a dress you wore in the early nineties as a sort of museum piece. Is it really in a museum?"
Courtney Love: "The dress is still very current. People still design off that silly dress. The truth is I used to wear those dresses more than slips, but those dresses never got as famous as slips and I wanted them to have their due."
Interviewer: "The artwork also has a car wreck and a picture of Marie Antoinette. Why did you choose them?"

Courtney Love: "We actually show Anne Boleyn too. She was Henry VIII's wife who had her head chopped off. When I was little, I used to see these pictures of her with this necklace that had a B on it. I always had a fascination with ancient history, Roman especially, and early English, and I kept imagining her getting her head chopped off, for my whole life. Then, I told my friend Joe, who did the art. He always had an obsession with Marie Antoinette too. She was also decapitated. We also thought about Jayne Mansfield, just the idea of a woman having her mouth and eyes and ears taken away from her. And, hand grenades, the top comes off. You just pull out the pin and it explodes. So, if you take away someone's mouth and their eyes and their senses and their brain, they explode. I saw a grenade in my head, I saw taking out the clip, and then I thought of a human body and what happens if you take out the clip."

In 2010, Hole reused the portraits of Marie Antoinette and Anne Boleyn for the front and back covers of their fourth studio album, Nobody's Daughter. However, both of the portraits were cropped so as to depict both Antoinette and Boleyn as headless. The centerpiece of the vinyl LP on My Body, The Hand Grenade features a full-bodied portrait of Marie Antoinette, as opposed to the headless version seen on the cover of Nobody's Daughter.

== Track listing ==
No.	Title	Writer(s)	Length
1.	"Turpentine"	Courtney Love; Eric Erlandson	4:00
2.	"Phonebill Song"	Love; Erlandson	1:48
3.	"Retard Girl"	Love	4:46
4.	"Burn Black"	Love; Erlandson	4:56
5.	"Dicknail"	Love; Erlandson	3:40
6.	"Beautiful Son"	Love; Erlandson; Patty Schemel	2:30
7.	"20 Years in the Dakota"	Love; Erlandson; Schemel	2:54
8.	"Miss World" (demo version)	Love; Erlandson	3:29
9.	"Old Age"	Love; Kurt Cobain	4:23
10.	"Softer, Softest" (from MTV Unplugged)	Love; Erlandson	3:47
11.	"He Hit Me (And It Felt Like a Kiss)" (from MTV Unplugged)	Carole King; Gerry Goffin	3:44
12.	"Season of the Witch" (from MTV Unplugged)	Donovan Leitch	3:42
13.	"Drown Soda" (live)	Love; Erlandson; Jill Emery; Caroline Rue	6:10
14.	"Asking for It" (live)	Love; Erlandson	3:58
Total length:			55:52

== Personnel ==
Hole

- Courtney Love – lead vocals, rhythm guitar (1–6; 8–14), bass (7)
- Eric Erlandson – lead guitar (1–14)
- Jill Emery – bass (1–5)
- Caroline Rue – drums (1–5)
- Patty Schemel – drums (6–14)
- Kristen Pfaff – bass, backing vocals (9)
- Melissa Auf der Maur – bass, backing vocals (10–14)

Guest musicians

- Jack Endino – bass (6)
- Kurt Cobain – bass (8)

Technical

- Eric Erlandson – producer, engineer, mixing
- Barry Goldberg – producer, mixing
- James Moreland – producer, engineer (1–3)
- Michael James – producer, engineer (4, 5)
- Jack Endino – producer, engineer, mixing (6, 7)

Technical (cont.)

- Craig Montgomery – producer, engineer (8)
- Paul Q. Kolderie – producer, engineer (9)
- Sean Slade – producer, engineer (9)
- Hal Wilner – producer, engineer, mixer (10–12)
- Miti – producer, engineer (13, 14)
- Steven Marcussen – mastering

Design

- Brian Celler – album co-ordinator
- Courtney Love – art direction
- Joe Mama-Nitzberg – art direction
  - Catherine Lorenz – design
  - Alex Slade – photography
  - Vickie Berndt – photography
  - Mark Selinger – photography
  - Stephane Sednaoui – photography

Credits adapted from the liner notes of My Body, the Hand Grenade.

== Charts ==
Chart performance for My Body, the Hand Grenade
Chart (1997)	Peak position
UK Albums (Official Charts)	82
UK Independent Albums (Official Charts)	9

== Works cited ==
- Buckley, Peter; Edroso, Roy (2003). The Rough Guide to Rock. Rough Guides. ISBN 978-1-84353-105-0. OCLC 936532596.
- Crawford, Anwen (2014). Hole's Live Through This. 33 1/3. Bloomsbury USA. ISBN 978-1-623-56377-6.
- Lankford, Ronald D. Jr. (2009). Women Singer-Songwriters in Rock: A Populist Rebellion in the 1990s. Lanham: Scarecrow Press. ISBN 978-0-8108-7268-4. OCLC 759928007.
- Stone, Jon R. (2013). The Routledge Dictionary of Latin Quotations: The Illiterati's Guide to Latin Maxims, Mottoes, Proverbs, and Sayings. Routledge. ISBN 978-1-135-88110-8.
- Stras, Laurie, ed. (2010). She's So Fine: Reflections on Whiteness, Femininity, Adolescence and Class in 1960s Music. Routledge. ISBN 978-1-4094-3665-2.
- Thompson, Dave (2000). Alternative Rock. Hal Leonard Corporation. ISBN 978-0-879-30607-6.
