= Kidnapping of Colleen Stan =

U.S. kidnapping in 1977

Colleen Stan
- Born: Colleen Stan; December 31, 1956 (age 69); Eugene, Oregon, U.S.
- Known for: Kidnapping, rape, torture survivor

Colleen Stan (born December 31, 1956) is an American woman who was kidnapped and held as a sex slave by Cameron and Janice Hooker in their Red Bluff, California, home for over seven years, between 1977 and 1984. At Cameron's trial, Stan's experience was described as unparalleled in FBI history. Janice was granted immunity from prosecution in exchange for testimony, while Cameron was found guilty on multiple charges and sentenced to 104 years in prison. Stan's case has received international publicity, and been the subject of multiple books, films, and television series.

== Kidnapping ==
On May 19, 1977, 20-year-old Colleen Stan was hitchhiking from her home in Eugene, Oregon, to a friend's home in Westwood, California, where she was going to attend a birthday party. Cameron Hooker (born November 5, 1953) kidnapped Stan after picking her up along Interstate 5 in Red Bluff, California. Stan stated that she was an experienced hitchhiker and earlier had declined two rides before accepting Hooker's. She reportedly "felt confident climbing into the blue van", because Hooker's wife, Janice (born 1958), and their baby were in the car.

When they stopped at a gas station along the way, Stan went to use the restroom. She recalled, "A voice told me to run and jump out a window and never look back", but she calmed her fears and went back to the car. Around 20 minutes into the ride Cameron pulled off the highway, claiming to be interested in investigating some nearby caves. Stan said it was at this point that "Janice got out of the car and went down to a lake with the baby. They were playing when Cameron got into the back seat and held a knife to my throat. He tied me up and placed a box over my head." She was subsequently locked in a wooden "headbox" that was designed to prevent light, sound, and fresh air from entering.

== Background and imprisonment ==
Before this, Cameron, then a lumber mill worker at Diamond International Lumber Mill, and Janice had reached an agreement that he could capture a slave to take Janice's place, because up until that time, Cameron had been using Janice to act out sexual bondage. There was to be no penetrative sex with Stan according to the agreement, but this later changed. On the first night of her kidnapping, Stan was strung up by her hands, physically attacked by Cameron, and left blindfolded and suspended while the pair had sex below her.

After her kidnapping, Stan stated that she was tortured and kept locked in a box 23 hours a day until she was given a contract and forced to sign herself into slavery for life in January 1978. In view from the box, propped up against her purse under the bed, was a photo of Marie Elizabeth Spannhake, a previous victim whose body was never found. She further stated that Cameron led her to believe that she was being watched by a large, powerful organization called "The Company" which would painfully torture her and harm her family if she tried to escape.

Stan subsequently became a slave referred to as "K", was forced to call Cameron "Master", and was not allowed to talk without permission. Cameron reportedly wanted Stan to be like the female character in the 1954 French erotic novel Story of O and soon started orally raping her. Cameron did not want to have vaginal sex with Stan because he considered that to be a breach of his agreement with his wife. Instead, he raped her vaginally and anally with implements. Following this, the Hooker family moved to a mobile home in Red Bluff with Stan, where she was kept locked in wooden boxes under the couple's water bed. In 1978, Janice gave birth to a second child on the water bed above Stan.

Stan said that her faith in God and belief in a chance of escape helped her survive; her greatest fear, which Cameron "reinforced" daily, was of "The Company." To avoid painful punishments, Stan tried to comply with his commandments, which later led to her being allowed to go out to jog, work in the yard, care for the family's children in the mobile home, and help him build bigger accommodations—including an underground dungeon—for more slaves. Even with an open door, neighbors, and a telephone, she made no attempt to escape as, according to Stan, her fear of "The Company" kept her from seeking help.

Additionally, Stan was allowed to visit her family by herself in 1981 but did not reveal her situation due to her fear of the possible consequences. Her family thought she was involved in a cult because of her homemade clothes, lack of money, and the absence of communications over the years; they did not want to pressure her, fearing she would stay away forever. The next day, Stan returned for a second visit, with Hooker posing as her boyfriend. At the trial, Stan explained that she was happy about visiting her family, who were therefore able to take a photograph of her and Cameron happily smiling together.

According to Stan, Hooker feared he had given his slave too much freedom and took her back to his mobile home, where he locked her in the wooden box under his water bed; she remained in the box 23 hours a day for the next three years. She dealt with bodily functions using a bed pan, which she positioned with her feet, and ate scraps of food. It was stated in court that Hooker's children were told "K" had gone home; however, once his children had gone to bed, Hooker would take Stan out of the box to feed and torture her.

== Aftermath and consequences ==
=== Escape and trial ===
It was not until 1983 that Stan was reintroduced to the children and neighbors; she was also allowed to get a job as a maid at a motel. Hooker wanted Stan to become his second wife, which was a turning point for Janice. Janice confessed that—starting with their first date—she had also been tortured, brainwashed, and referred to as a "whore" over the years by Cameron. Janice further stated that she survived their relationship by engaging in denial and compartmentalization. By August 1984, Janice began struggling with herself and went to Stan to inform her that Hooker was not part of "The Company." However, she maintained that the organization did exist.

In a televised interview for Girl in the Box, Stan told the interviewer that she then went to a bus station and phoned Hooker to inform him that she was leaving him, and that he reacted by bursting into tears; Stan subsequently caught a bus home. In the months that followed, she did not contact the police but continued to call Hooker regularly; she explained this at the trial by saying that she wanted to give Hooker, at Janice's request, a chance to reform. Three months later, Janice reported her husband to the police.

She informed Lt. Jerry Brown of the Red Bluff Police that Cameron had previously kidnapped, tortured, and murdered 19-year-old Marie Elizabeth Spannhake, who had disappeared on January 31, 1976, from Chico, California. According to Janice, Marie was walking home when she and Cameron picked her up before driving her to their home, where she was hung from her wrists in the basement, undressed, and tortured for an entire day. Spannhake was then shot in the stomach with a pellet gun and strangled by Cameron. The couple then wrapped Spannhake's body in blankets and buried her in a shallow grave near Lassen Volcanic National Park. Authorities were unable to locate any remains. Due to the lack of physical proof, no murder charge was brought.

Chris Hatcher, a forensic psychologist and criminal profiler, testified for Cameron's prosecution at the start of the 1985 trial, and Janice testified against her husband in exchange for full immunity. In the end, Hooker was sentenced to consecutive prison terms totaling 104 years for sexual assaults, kidnapping, and using a knife in the process.

=== Post-trial ===
After the trial, Stan studied for an accounting degree, and, as reported by Mara Bovsun in a New York Daily News article, "tried to move on to a normal life, but misery followed her—a string of failed marriages and a troubled child, now in jail." Stan also joined and volunteered for Redding Women's Refuge Center, an organization that helps abused women. Janice reverted to her maiden name, Lashley, became a registered associate social worker, and has worked as a mental health professional. Stan has changed her last name; both Janice and Stan continue to live in California.

Originally ineligible for parole until 2023, Hooker had his hearing date moved up seven years to 2015 through California's Elderly Parole Program. On April 16, 2015, his parole request was denied. Hooker would be eligible for another hearing in 2030.

In 2020, California officials contacted Stan and advised her that they were looking into possibly granting Hooker parole in March 2021; it was speculated by the president of the Tehama County Deputy Sheriff's Association that this was due to the COVID-19 pandemic, but later reports clarified that Hooker was eligible for parole due to his accumulation of good credit in prison. After a hearing, a trial was set to determine if Hooker should be classified as a Sexually Violent Predator (SVP); if he is, he will be sent to a mental facility indefinitely and will be ineligible for parole. The trial has been delayed numerous times; Jury selection began in mid-May 2026, and the trial is expected to last about four weeks. Hooker has been blocked from release in June 2026.

== Cultural impact ==
=== Films ===
The main plot of the American documentary-style horror film The Poughkeepsie Tapes (2007) was based on Stan's case. On September 10, 2016, a television movie based on the case, titled Girl in the Box, premiered on Lifetime starring Addison Timlin as Colleen, Zane Holtz as Cameron, and Zelda Williams as Janice. The movie was followed by a two-hour documentary called Colleen Stan: Girl in the Box.

=== Literature ===
The case is documented in the book Perfect Victim: The True Story of the Girl in the Box (1989), by prosecutor Christine McGuire and Carla Norton, and referenced in Kathy Reichs's novel Monday Mourning (2004). An updated version of Stan's story, Colleen Stan, The Simple Gifts of Life by Jim Green, was published in 2009.

=== Music ===
The 1990 song "Girl in a Box" by alternative band Blake Babies is based on Stan's case. The 1993 song "Jennifer's Body" by Hole in their album Live Through This is speculated to be based on Stan's experience. This is mostly due to the lines in the song “He cuts you down from the tree / He keeps you in a box by the bed”.

In 1996, the American rock band Elysian Fields released a song titled "Jack in the Box" for their debut studio album, Bleed Your Cedar, which was made available for purchase that same year. Its lyrical content delves into Stan's experience of being imprisoned by Cameron in the box under the bed he shared with his wife, and alludes to the power he had over her. The case inspired the name for Richard Ramirez's Texas experimental noise group Black Leather Jesus. In 2012, a short opera piece composed by Patrik Jarlestam and Jonas Bernander was based on the kidnapping, and premiered in Stockholm, under the name of Den 4444:e dagen (The 4444th day).

=== Television ===
The case, and its core elements of an invisible conspiracy used to coerce the victim into servitude and long periods of confinement, have formed the basis for several episodes of television crime series, including Criminal Minds (episode "The Company", season seven), Ghost Whisperer (episode "Ball & Chain", season four), and Law and Order: Special Victims Unit (episode "Slaves", season one). It was also profiled in the 2008 episode "Kidnapped" of the Investigation Discovery series Wicked Attraction. "The Apartment", a 2012 episode of the SyFy series Paranormal Witness, told the story of the disappearance of Marie Spannhake, and includes a cameo mention of Stan's kidnapping. The case was also mentioned in passing during an episode of Waking the Dead (episode "Fugue States", season four). Stan's case was profiled on an episode on Netflix's Unsolved Mysteries and on July 17, 2021, Stan recounted her ordeal in a Snapped: Notorious episode.

== See also ==
- List of kidnappings
- Lists of solved missing person cases
- List of long-term false imprisonment cases

== Bibliography ==
- Green, Jim B. (2009). Colleen Stan: The Simple Gifts of Life. Dubbed by the Media "The Girl in the Box" and "The Sex Slave". iUniverse. ISBN 978-1-4401-1837-1.
- Norton, Carla; McGuire, Christine (1989). Perfect Victim. New York: Dell Publishing. ISBN 978-0440204428.
