= Ask for It =

EP by Hole
- Released: September 12, 1995
- Recorded: 1991–1992
- Studio: Maida Vale (London); Whisky a Go Go (Los Angeles); Boyle residence (Hollywood)
- Genre: Alternative rock; punk rock
- Length: 19:04
- Label: Caroline
- Producer: Mike Robinson

Hole chronology
Live Through This (1994)	Ask for It (1995)	The First Session (1997)

Ask for It is an EP by the American alternative rock band Hole, released on September 12, 1995. It was the band's second and last release on Caroline Records, the first being their debut album Pretty on the Inside (1991). Although the EP was released after 1994's platinum-selling Live Through This, its contents were recorded by an earlier lineup of the band between 1991 and 1992. The EP comprises three songs by Hole as well as several cover versions of songs by the Wipers, Beat Happening, The Velvet Underground, and the Germs.

The recordings featured on the EP originate from several sources, including two studio sessions: a November 19, 1991 John Peel session for the BBC, and a March 1992 studio recording session for a Wipers tribute album; as well as a live performance at the Whisky a Go Go in West Hollywood on February 11, 1992.

== Background and recording ==
Ask for It featured songs recorded from several different sources; only one song on the EP was a studio recording, while the rest were from live performances with John Peel and at the Whisky a Go Go.

=== Recording sessions ===
November 19, 1991

Hole's first radio session, one of the famous John Peel Sessions, was recorded prior to their second UK tour with Daisy Chainsaw and Therapy?. The session took place at Studio 4 and was first broadcast on January 5, 1992. Hole frontwoman Courtney Love had written John Peel two letters previously, thanking him for airing "Retard Girl" on his radio show, which was the reason for Hole's sturdy fanbase in England at the time. During the session, live versions of "Doll Parts", "Violet", "Drown Soda" and "Forming/Hot Chocolate Boy" were recorded.

February 11, 1992

The band's live performance at the Whisky a Go Go on February 11, 1992, was recorded by Carlos Nuñez. The show included covers of the Beatles' "Cry, Baby, Cry", and "Pale Blue Eyes" by the Velvet Underground. According to Courtney Love, the band had only played "Pale Blue Eyes" once prior at the Whisky A Go Go, at a show on December 19, 1991. Footage of this performance had been recorded by Love's friend Joe Cole, a road manager who attended the show with Henry Rollins. Cole was murdered in a robbery on the way home after the concert, and the footage was given to the band after his death. During that performance, Love also stated that Kurt Cobain, whom she had just then begun dating, walked into the club right as the band began performing the song, and described his entrance into the crowd as "the sea parting". This show marked the final performances of drummer Caroline Rue and bassist Jill Emery, as they left the band after this concert.

March 1992

In 1992, Hole recorded a cover version of "Over the Edge" by Portland punk band the Wipers for a tribute album titled Fourteen Songs for Greg Sage and the Wipers (1993). Several other bands— many from Portland and the outlying area— recorded covers of Wipers songs, including Nirvana, Poison Idea, Calamity Jane, Dharma Bums, and M99.

Although Hole had been based in Los Angeles, Love had lived in Portland on and off between 1972 and 1985, and was part of the city's punk scene during the height of the Wipers' career. The recording session for "Over the Edge" took place at producer and engineer Jimmy Boyle's residence in Hollywood in 1992. At the end of the song, Love added the lyrics, "You, go to Portland / You might take him with you / You, go to Portland".

== Packaging ==
The front cover of the EP features a woman's outstretched arms side by side over a tile floor with slash marks on her wrists, alluding to suicide. The cover concept was designed by Courtney Love. The interior artwork features two black and white promotional shots of the band in 1991 among the liner notes.

== Reception ==
Professional ratings
Review scores
Source	Rating
AllMusic	2.5/5 stars
Robert Christgau	(3-star Honorable Mention)
Rolling Stone	3/5 stars
Entertainment Weekly	B+

The EP received a fairly positive reaction from critics. Robert Christgau gave the album a three-star honorable mention, and Entertainment Weekly gave the album a B+ rating, noting that the band's rendition of "Pale Blue Eyes" was "eerily compelling". The magazine also stated that "the cover image of a pair of wrists, decorated with newly healed scars, screams 'desperate cry for help' louder than any song on here."

The album received a 2.5 out of 5 stars from AllMusic, and in 2004, The Rolling Stone Album Guide gave it three out of five stars.

== Track listing ==
No.	Title	Writer(s)	Length
1.	"Over the Edge"	Greg Sage	2:47
2.	"Pale Blue Eyes"	Lou Reed	3:56
3.	"Drown Soda"	Courtney Love; Eric Erlandson; Jill Emery; Caroline Rue	3:51
4.	"Doll Parts"	Love	2:21
5.	"Violet"	Love; Erlandson	3:36
6.	"Forming/Hot Chocolate Boy"	Darby Crash/Beat Happening (Note: "Forming/Hot Chocolate Boy" features two partial cover versions of "Forming" by the Germs, and "Hot Chocolate Boy" by Beat Happening. While the track title denotes "Forming" first and "Hot Chocolate Boy" second, the recording comprises the opposite: The track begins with the first verse of "Hot Chocolate Boy," after which it merges into the chorus from "Forming.")	1:32
Total length:			19:04

== Personnel ==
Hole

- Courtney Love – vocals, guitar
- Eric Erlandson – guitar
- Jill Emery – bass
- Caroline Rue – drums

Production

- Mike Robinson – producer, engineer (3–6)
- Chris MacLean – engineer
- West West Side Music – mastering

Design

- Courtney Love – cover concept
- Scott Jones – cover photography
- Michael Lavine – photography
- Tom Bejgrowicz – design
- Peter Ciccone – design, layout
- Vincent Li – typography

== Charts ==
Chart (1995–1996)	Peak position
Australian Albums (ARIA)	183
US Billboard 200	172
