= Closing Time (Hole song) =

Song by Hole
- Recorded: January 21, 1993 at BMG Ariola Ltda in Rio de Janeiro, Brazil
- Genre: Alternative rock
- Length: 3:10
- Songwriters: Courtney Love, Kurt Cobain, Patty Schemel
- Producer: Craig Montgomery

"Closing Time" (also referred to as "Drunk in Rio" and, incorrectly, "It's Closing Soon") is a song by American alternative rock band Hole, written by vocalist/rhythm guitarist Courtney Love, drummer Patty Schemel and Love's husband, Nirvana frontman Kurt Cobain.

== Origin and recording ==
The song's origins are obscure due to lack of official information, however, the earliest known recording of the song dates back to January 1993, at which time Hole were writing new material for their second studio album, Live Through This (1994). The in-studio performance was recorded in Studio B at BMG Ariola Ltda., a recording facility in Rio de Janeiro, Brazil, on January 21, 1993. The session was a pre-production studio session, produced by Craig Montgomery, for Nirvana for their forthcoming album, In Utero (1993) and lasted for three days. On the third and final day of the session, Love and Schemel joined the band in-studio and were given the opportunity to practice and record new Hole material during Nirvana's session breaks. At least three other Hole songs are known to have been recorded; "Miss World," which featured Cobain on bass, "Softer, Softest," "She Walks on Me" and "I Think That I Would Die," which featured Nirvana touring guitarist Big John Duncan on bass. Towards the end of the session "Closing Time" was recorded. This recording, circulating unofficially in bootleg trading circles, featured Love on vocals and lead guitar, Cobain on bass and Schemel on drums and lead to the song being referred to as "Drunk in Rio," due to fact that all three musicians were intoxicated when recording.

In 1995, Love forwarded a copy of the studio version of "Closing Time" to BBC radio host John Peel on cassette tape, after the death of Cobain, and broadcast it on his radio show, The John Peel Show on BBC Radio 1. It is assumed that the radio broadcast version of the song was recorded and then distributed to various bootleggers, leading to the song's inclusion on the Nirvana bootleg series Outcesticide, however Blue Moon Records, the label on which the bootleg series was released, claimed that the recording was sourced from Love's own tape.

== Composition ==
The original version of the song is completely improvised, both musically and lyrically, and the vocals are indecipherable due to their inaudibility in the recording mix and the mumbling vocal style. However, the song's three main chords (A-G-C) are repeated throughout the verses and choruses apart from a bridge which uses experimental chords. The song's theme is reputedly based on a bitter relationship and the term "closing time" is often seen as referring to the end of the relationship itself.

A more structured and lyrically-coherent version of the song was performed by Hole on various occasions throughout 1994 and 1995, during their tours promoting Live Through This. These live versions also featured bassist Melissa Auf der Maur and lead guitarist Eric Erlandson and the lyrics of the song varied in performance.

== Related projects ==
Love, Schemel and Cobain also wrote and recorded various other songs unrelated to the recording session in Rio de Janeiro. A side project, known as Nighty Nite, arose the following month, in February 1993, in which Love and Schemel musicians "pretended [they] were two sisters from Marysville, [aged] seventeen and sixteen, [called] Dottie and Clara. [They] put the pitch way up on the four-track and [they] made up these really stupid songs" and Cobain also contributed. Three songs are known to exist; "Lemonade Nation," "Hello Kitty" and "Twister." Copies of the recording were sent to Maximumrocknroll, Kim Gordon, Thurston Moore, members of Bikini Kill and Fugazi, Calvin Johnson, and Slim Moon.
