= Jennifer's Body (disambiguation) =

Jennifer's Body is a 2009 American comedy horror film.

Jennifer's Body may also refer to:

- Jennifer's Body (soundtrack), the soundtrack to the film
- "Jennifer's Body" (Hole song), 1994
- "Jennifer's Body" (Ken Carson song), 2023
- "Jennifer's Body" (Chucky), a 2023 TV episode
- "Jennifer's Body", a song by Wet Leg from Moisturizer (album)
