= Circle One / Shutdown =

- Front cover art, featuring Hole

Single by Hole and The Monkeywrench

from the album A Small Circle of Friends
- Released: November 1994
- Recorded: "Circle One": December 18, 1992 in Los Angeles, California, U.S.; "Shutdown": 1992 in Seattle, Washington, U.S.
- Genre: Punk rock; garage rock
- Label: Gasatanka Records
- Songwriters: Darby Crash; Pat Smear

Hole singles chronology
"Doll Parts" (1994)	"Circle One" / "Shutdown" (1994)	"Violet" (1995)

"Circle One / Shutdown" is a split single by the American alternative rock band, Hole and the supergroup, The Monkeywrench, released in November 1994, on the independent label Gasatanka Records. Both tracks are cover versions of songs by the Los Angeles punk group the Germs. On the single, Hole is credited as "The Holez," a nominal homage to "The Germs."

Pat Smear, an original member of the Germs, performed as a guest musician on Hole's cover of "Circle One," with frontwoman Courtney Love playing bass guitar—at the time of the track's recording in 1992, Hole had not yet hired a new bassist following the departure of Jill Emery.

Both of the band's tracks were later issued on the Germs tribute album A Small Circle of Friends (1996).

== Recording ==
Hole recorded their cover of "Circle One" on December 18, 1992 in Los Angeles with producer Brian Foxworthy. Pat Smear, an original member of the Germs, played guitar on the track with Hole, while frontwoman Courtney Love played bass guitar.

The Monkeywrench recorded their cover of "Shutdown" in Seattle in 1992 with producer Conrad Uno.

== Reception ==
A review published by Musician praised the track as "a welcome, timely reminder that the songs Crash created with the Germs have a life that stands apart." Douglas Wolk of CMJ New Music Monthly gave the track an unfavorable review, deeming it "tossed off and unconvincing."

A retrospective review by The Harvard Crimson declared it the group's second-best cover song, describing it as a "cacophony of scribbling guitars... Hole harnesses the song’s frantic energy, somehow making it sound adorable, yet just as powerful as the original. Love's scream resounds loudly throughout the song...screaming should sound terrible, but Love somehow makes it a gorgeous expression of pure joy."

== Track listing ==
1. "Circle One" by Hole (Darby Crash, Pat Smear) – 2:58
2. "Shutdown" by The Monkeywrench (Crash, Smear) – 3:10

== Personnel ==
=== Hole ===
- Courtney Love – vocals, bass
- Eric Erlandson – guitar
- Patty Schemel – drums

Guest musicians

- Pat Smear – guitar

(credited as "The Holez")

=== The Monkeywrench ===
- Mark Arm – vocals, piano
- Tim Kerr – slide guitar
- Steve Turner – bass
- Thom Price – guitar
- Martin Bland – drums
