= Violet (Hole song) =

1995 single by Hole

- Cover art from the 7-inch vinyl release

Single by Hole

from the album Live Through This
- B-side: "Old Age"; "He Hit Me (And It Felt Like a Kiss)"; "Whose Porno You Burn (Black)"
- Written: Mid-1991
- Released: July 17, 1995
- Recorded: October 1993
- Studio: Triclops Sound (Marietta, Georgia, U.S.)
- Genre: Alternative rock; grunge; punk rock
- Length: 3:25
- Label: DGC
- Songwriters: Courtney Love; Eric Erlandson
- Producers: Paul Q. Kolderie; Sean Slade

Hole singles chronology
"Circle One / Shutdown" (1994)	"Violet" (1995)	"Softer, Softest" (1995)

Music video
- "Violet" on YouTube

"Violet" is a song by American alternative rock band Hole, written by vocalist and guitarist Courtney Love and guitarist Eric Erlandson. The song was written in mid-1991, and was performed live between 1991 and 1992 during Hole's earlier tours, eventually appearing as the opening track on the band's second studio album Live Through This (1994). The song was released as the group's seventh single and the third from that album in 1995.

The lyrics of "Violet" were inspired by Love's tumultuous relationship with Smashing Pumpkins frontman Billy Corgan in 1990. Several critics and scholars have noted parallels in the lyrics between Corgan as well as Love's late husband, Kurt Cobain. The themes of sexual exploitation, violence, self-abasement, and resentment, have also been noted, and some critics have compared elements of the song to the works of Bessie Smith and Janis Joplin.

"Violet" peaked at number 29 on the Billboard's Modern Rock Tracks after the album's release in 1994, and is considered one of Hole's most well-known and critically recognized songs. It charted at number 116 on The 500 Greatest Songs Since You Were Born list by Blender magazine in 2005.

The cover artwork for the single features a Victorian mourning portrait of a deceased young girl which was acquired from the historical archives of Stanley Burns. A music video, released in 1995, features Love among numerous strippers performing in an early-20th century dance hall, contrasted with ballerinas and young girls dancing in an elegant theater.

== Background and recording ==
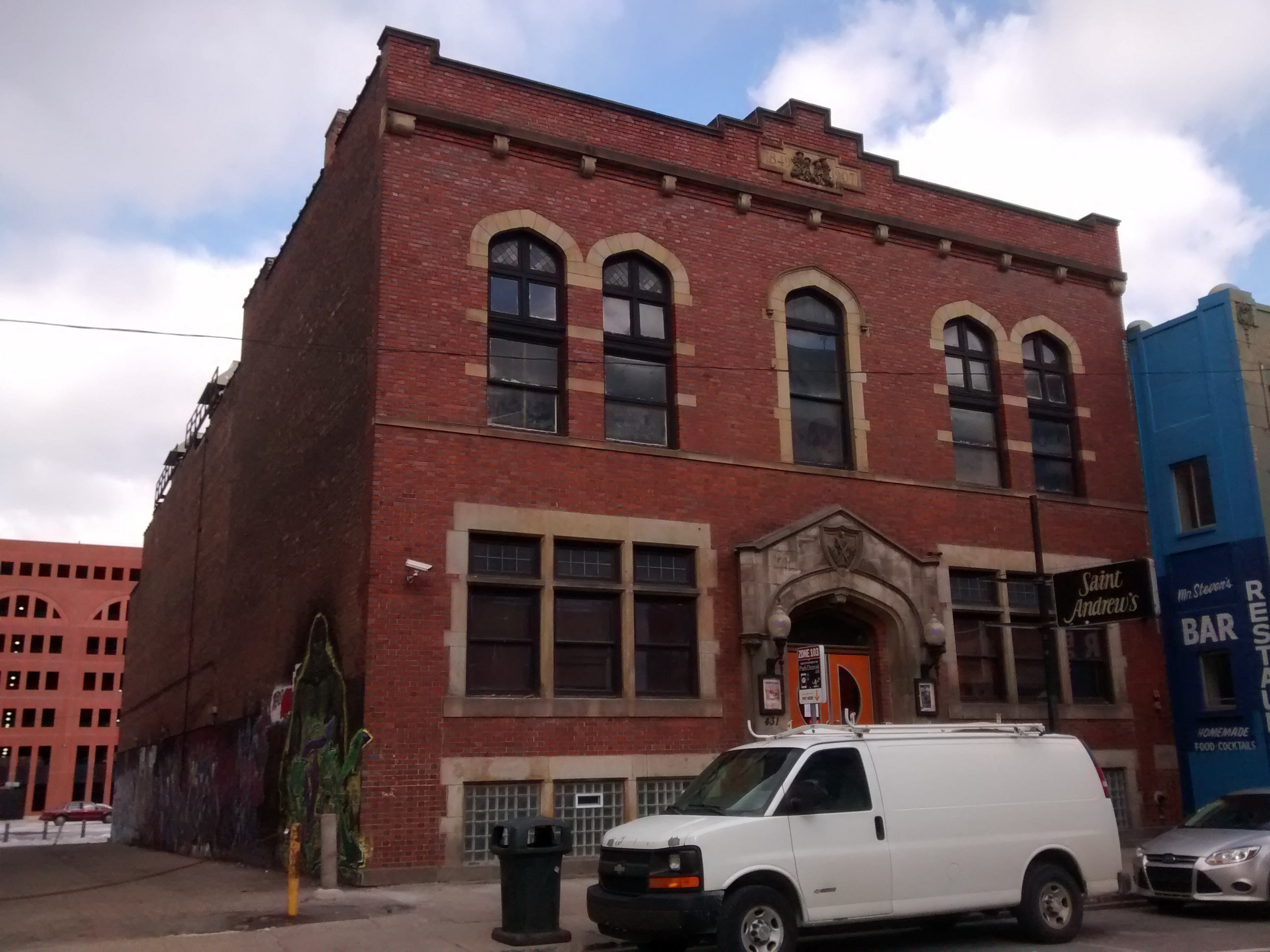
Love finished writing "Violet" at St. Andrew's Hall in Detroit in 1991

Courtney Love began writing "Violet" in mid-1991, during a Hole tour before the release of the band's debut album, Pretty on the Inside; "Violet" lyrics appear on a flyer designed by Love to advertise a show at Jabberjaw, a rock club in Los Angeles, on August 7, 1991; she stated that she partly wrote the song at Jabberjaw. In a 1995 interview, she stated that she finished the song in the band's tour van outside St. Andrews Hall in Detroit, Michigan during the band's sound check. As Love recalled, "[It was] on Halloween... we were opening for the Laughing Hyenas, and there were 40 people there. [I had heard] five songs from Nevermind, and I was so jealous of those songs that I had to try to top them. I could not believe that somebody I knew, somebody from our underground, had written a batch of songs so fiercely great." The band played the song live in Toronto, Ontario, Canada on November 1, 1991 during the band's tour to promote their first album, Pretty on the Inside. Early versions of the song were played several times between 1991 and 1992 at other live performances.

The first known studio version of "Violet" was recorded on November 19, 1991, at Maida Vale Studios as part of Hole's first radio session with BBC DJ John Peel. In October 1993, the band recorded the album version of the song as part of the Live Through This sessions at Triclops Studios in Atlanta, Georgia. The recording from the 1991 Peel session was included on the band's 1995 EP Ask For It, along with "Doll Parts", which was recorded during the same studio visit.

On both Live Through This and the individual single, the songwriting is credited collectively to Hole, however according to BMI's website, "Violet" was written only by Eric Erlandson and Love.

== Composition ==
The song is composed of a series of 3-note power chords, and veers between "soft verses and harsher choruses." The verses of the song feature a singular chord progression composed of the power chords (E5-C5-G5). The choruses of the song feature a three-chord progression (E5-F5-G5), as well as a chord progression similar to that of the chorus (E5-C5-D5-A5). There are two guitars featured in the song, with Love playing clean rhythm guitar and Erlandson playing lead guitar with heavy distortion.

"Violet" was reputedly written about The Smashing Pumpkins frontman Billy Corgan, with whom Love had had a relationship prior to her relationship with Nirvana frontman Kurt Cobain. On May 5, 1995, Love introduced the song on Later... with Jools Holland as "a song about a jerk, I hexed him and now he's losing his hair", which is seen as a reference to Corgan's hair loss. As a result of the reports that the song was written about Corgan, it was featured at No. 9 on The Daily Beast's "14 Fiercest Breakup Songs" list in 2010.

Variations of the song's lyrics, such as: "The sky turned violet / I want it again / And violent more violent", figure in a poem titled "Above The Boy" that Love wrote in 1991.

== Analysis ==
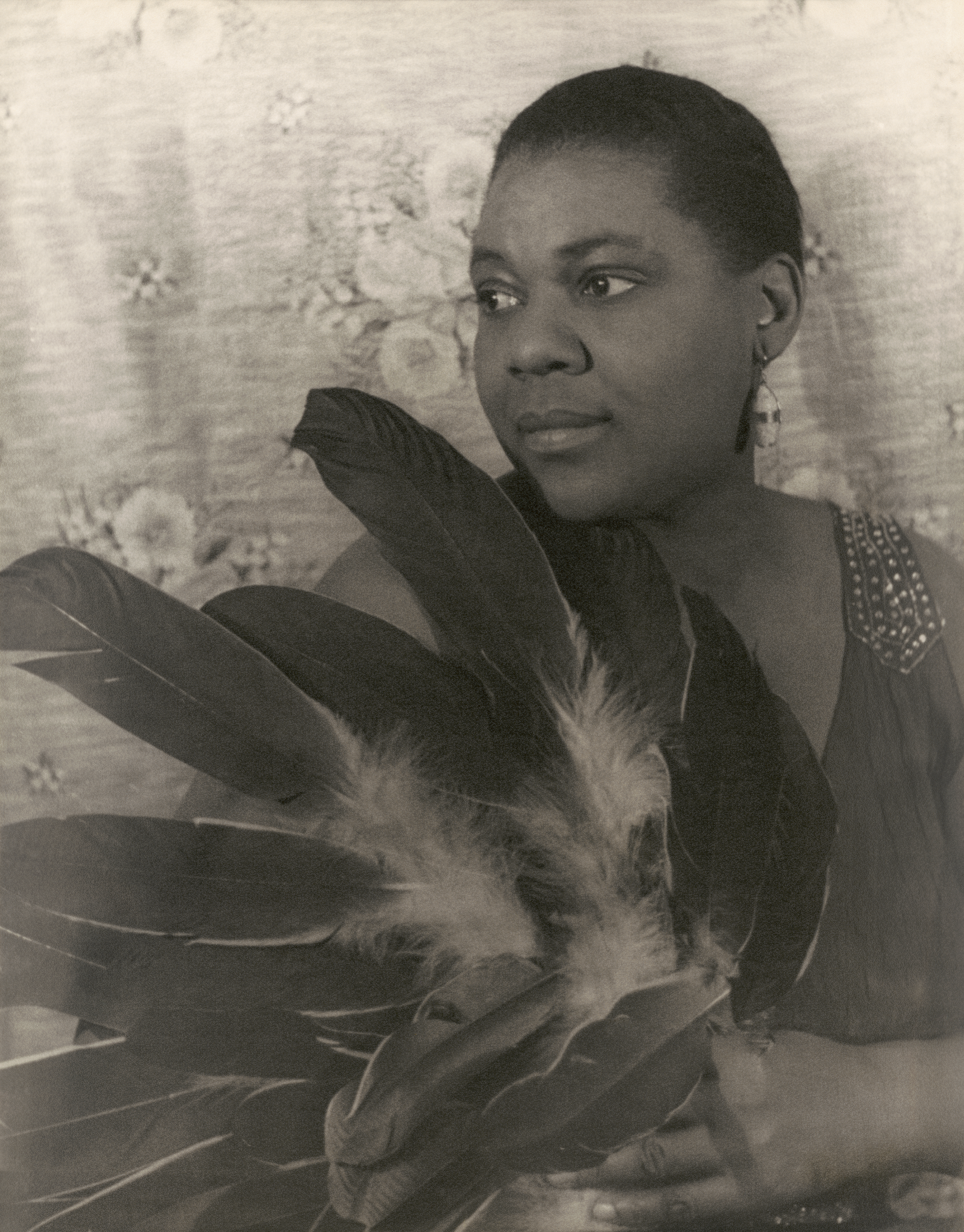
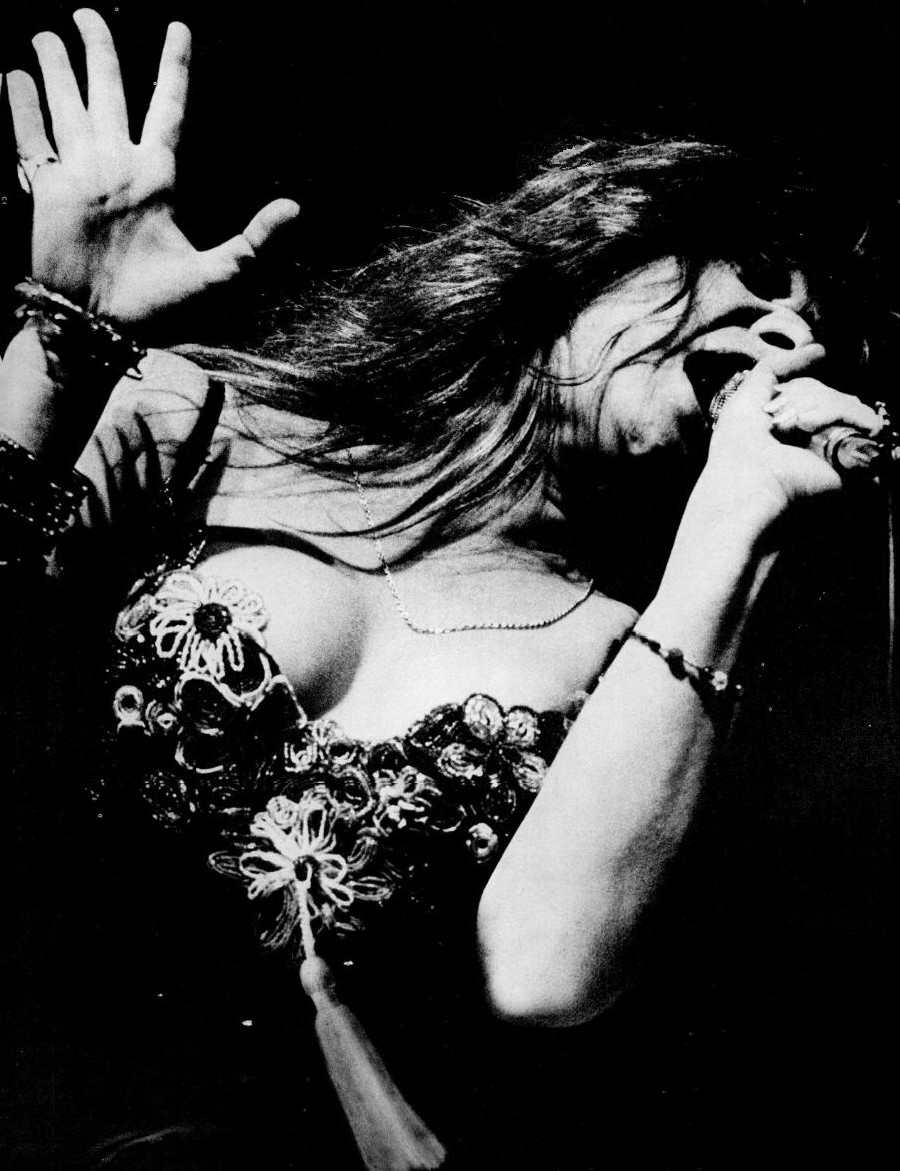
Some critics have compared "Violet" to works by Bessie Smith (left) and Janis Joplin (right)

Scholar Carol Siegel compared "Violet" to Janis Joplin's "Piece of My Heart" as a "popular song styling of female sexuality at different points in white women's emancipation." Commenting on the song's lyrical content, she writes that "Love's body becomes the battleground upon which she meets and defeats males who would possess her." Siegel suggests that the song's lyrics toy with the idea of offering one's body for subjugation, but that Love shifts the power dynamic "at the moment of her offer... she reasserts her control, not unlike Bessie Smith challenging her listeners to deny that her body belongs to her, to destroy because it is she who chooses." Furthermore, Siegel suggests that the song's title itself alludes to the word "violate" as Love vocalizes it in her performance.

Music critic Ronald Lankford echoes a similar sentiment, interpreting the song as being clearly written from the perspective of a woman speaking to her former lover, as well as "no one in particular," and also characterizes the song as a "mini-drama between lasting love and temporary fame." Other music scholars, such as Anwen Crawford, have drawn parallels between the song's lyrical references to amethyst and "little fish" to Kurt Cobain, who was born in February (the month whose birthstone is amethyst), and Billy Corgan, both of whose astrological signs are Pisces.

== Reception ==
"Violet" was the band's third most popular single from Live Through This, behind "Doll Parts" and "Miss World", charting at number 29 in the Billboard's Modern Rock Tracks in April 1995, and went on to become one of the band's signature songs.

The song was well-reviewed by critics. "Live Through This is barely seconds old before Courtney takes 'Violet' by the horns and bellows, 'Go, take everything! Take everything, I dare you to!' in a manner guaranteed to have anyone who has ever given her so much as a surly glance watching their backs," noted Clark Collis in Select. Rolling Stone said of it: "With its daydream whispers and startling gunshot-guitar chorus, "Violet" shakes, rattles and roars like a godless marriage of "Smells Like Teen Spirit" and Fleetwood Mac's "Go Your Own Way."" The song was placed in a 2010 NME article titled Hole's 10 Finest Moments, where it was referred to as "the quintessential Hole track" and a "titanic temper tantrum and exhilarating rush of inconsolable rage at full vent... "Go on, take everything, take everything I want you to", she bellows, turning powerlessness into power over riffs that swing from sweet and melancholy to boiling and volcanic on a dime."

The song has been featured in several films, and in 2005 ranked at number 116 on The 500 Greatest Songs Since You Were Born list by Blender magazine.

== Music video ==
The music video contrasts women pole dancing in an early-20th-century strip club with footage of performing ballerinas

The promotional music video for "Violet" was filmed in late 1994 and was directed by Mark Seliger and Fred Woodward. The video features a 1920s-era strip club with burlesque dancers, juxtaposed with footage of several young ballerinas and young girls dancing on a theatre stage. Writer Barbara O'Dair summarized the video as consisting of "innocent girls in tutus juxtaposed with naughty, fleshy sex-club dancers." Love pole dances in the music video in the period fashion, and is also featured in a tutu on the ballet stage with the girls. These scenes are integrated with footage of the band performing the song.

The video follows themes discussed in the song, particularly sexual exploitation of women. According to Love, the content of the video was inspired by "acid flashbacks" and "old film stock". "I love old pornography," Love said, "But I wanted to at the same time, you know... all of the [music] videos for years that have put stripping or half-naked women on a pedestal, I wanted to sort of show the degrading experience that it is." Siegel notes that the music video replays Love's "well-known past as a stripper through performances that are more threatening than erotic." An article in Spin described the aged footage in the video as avant-garde. Many of the scenes in the video aesthetically mimic early-20th century silent films and talkies, with faux-aged cinematography and lapses in audio and visual synchronization.

The music video was the first video to feature newly recruited bassist Melissa Auf der Maur after the death of Kristen Pfaff in June 1994. In a 1995 interview during the KROQ Weenie Roast, Auf der Maur commented on the music video's themes, citing "pornography versus ballet, strippers, and beautiful out-of-synch artwork". According to drummer Patty Schemel, the dancers featured in the music video were actual strippers handpicked by Love from Jumbo's Clown Room, a Los Angeles dance bar where Love had worked in the 1980s.

In 2021, Slant Magazine named it the 25th greatest music video of all time.

== Track listings ==
All songs were written by Courtney Love and Eric Erlandson, except where noted.

UK 7-inch single; Dutch CD single (GFS 94; GSF 94; GED 22070)

1. "Violet" – 3:25
2. "Old Age" (Love, Kurt Cobain) – 4:23

UK 7-inch single, violet vinyl (GFSP 94)

1. "Violet" – 3:25
2. "He Hit Me (And It Felt Like a Kiss)" (live) (Note: "He Hit Me", "Whose Porno You Burn" and "Credit in the Straight World" were recorded live at MTV Unplugged in New York on February 14, 1995, Tempodrom in Berlin on April 22, 1995, and Hollywood Palladium on November 9, 1994, respectively.) (King, Goffin) – 3:48

Australian CD single (GEFDS21979)

1. "Violet" – 3:25
2. "Credit in the Straight World" (live) (Stuart Moxham) – 2:32

German (EFA 04961-2) and UK (GFSTD 94) CD singles

1. "Violet" – 3:25
2. "Old Age" (Love, Cobain) – 4:23
3. "He Hit Me (And It Felt Like a Kiss)" (live) (Carole King, Gerry Goffin) – 3:48
4. "Whose Porno You Burn (Black)" (live) – 3:44

== Credits and personnel ==
Hole

- Courtney Love – lead vocals, guitar
- Eric Erlandson – guitar
- Kristen Pfaff – bass, backing vocals
- Patty Schemel – drums, percussion

Production

- Paul Q. Kolderie – producer, engineer
- Sean Slade – producer, engineer
- Hal Willner – producer (on "He Hit Me (And It Felt Like a Kiss)")
- Levi Tecofski – engineering (on "Whose Porno You Burn (Black)")
- Scott Litt – mixing
- Pat McCarthy – mixing (on "He Hit Me (And It Felt Like a Kiss)")

== Charts ==
Chart (1995)	Peak position
Australia (ARIA)	110
Finland (Suomen virallinen lista)	20
Netherlands (Single Top 100)	45
UK Singles (OCC)	17
US Modern Rock Tracks (Billboard)	29
Europe (Eurochart Hot 100)	76

== Certifications ==
Region	Certification	Certified units/sales
United States (RIAA)	Gold	500,000^{‡}
^{‡} Sales+streaming figures based on certification alone.

== Release history ==
Region	Date	Format(s)	Label(s)	Ref.
United States	February 1995	CD promo	DGC	(Note: February 11, 1995, Billboard listing, which denotes "Violet" as a "new" single that week)
United Kingdom	July 17, 1995	7-inch vinyl; CD	Geffen	

== Sources ==
- Crawford, Anwen (2014). Hole's Live Through This. 33 1/3. Bloomsbury USA. ISBN 978-1-623-56377-6.
- Lankford, Ronald D. Jr. (2009). Women Singer-Songwriters in Rock: A Populist Rebellion in the 1990s. Scarecrow Press. ISBN 978-0-8108-7268-4.
- Love, Courtney (2006). Dirty Blonde: The Diaries of Courtney Love. Picador. ISBN 0-330-44546-4.
- O'Dair, Barbara (1997). Trouble Girls: The Rolling Stone Book of Women in Rock. New York: Random House. ISBN 978-0-679-76874-6.
- Siegel, Carol (2000). New Millennial Sexstyles. Bloomington, Indiana: Indiana University Press. ISBN 978-0-253-33775-7.
