= Chris Hatcher (psychologist) =

American psychologist (1946–1999)

- Born: 1946
- Died: 1999 (aged 52–53)
- Education: University of California, San Francisco
- Occupation: Clinical psychologist

Chris Hatcher, Ph.D., (1946 – 1999) was a clinical psychologist at the University of California, San Francisco, who was an expert in police and forensic psychology. He dedicated his professional life to the study of violence and its prevention. He died unexpectedly at the age of 52.

== Workplace violence ==
Hatcher was one of the first experts to recognize the importance of understanding workplace violence and develop methods of threat assessment. He was acutely aware that the damage came not only from the violence itself in the workplace, but from mental torture created by the fear of threats of violence. He tried to develop an organized method of identifying and assessing threats before violence occurred, helping organizations determine the signs and symptoms of stress in an employee that could trigger violence, stressing understanding the process through which stress develops into a violence act by an employee. He served as an effective consultant on site once violence was threatened, working to free employees from the fear created by the threats. He advocated a multidisciplinary approach in responding to and containing workplace violence through, among other methods, effective employee assistance programs.

Hatcher also worked with the victims of violence to help them cope. For example, he worked with the father of Polly Klaas, Marc Klaas, after her murder.

== Criminal profiling ==
Hatcher was an expert in forensic areas, including the study of the mind of various types of murderers. In dealing with the cult leader, David Koresh, in the Waco siege, he believed that it was important to understand that cults require constant excitement to bind them to the cult leader. He said a violent confrontation with cult members played into their beliefs of being persecuted, increasing the probability of violent deaths. In his analysis, the first stage of violence occurs when the cult leader tells his followers that evil forces are out to get the cult so the cult must develop security to protect itself.

Hatcher analyzed the behavioral patterns of the Tylenol killer and determined that the Tylenol killer's thinking patterns were similar to that of an arsonist or bomber, not those of a mass murderer. While many killers receive some satisfaction in stalking their victims, the Tylenol killer was more technically oriented and removed, not specifically choosing any one victim and not seeming to care who was killed. Unlike most killers, he had no direct contact with his victim.

Through this continued study and observation of criminal behavior, Hatcher became known for his experience in criminal profiling.

== Expert witness ==
Hatcher testified as an expert witness in the case, People v. Gregory Scott Smith in which he characterized the defendant as a "sadistic pedophile" during the sentencing phase of a death penalty case. He described the common characteristics of persons who commit abductions similar to this case, explaining that they are living out a fantasy regarding the rape and molestation of children, and that the components of the fantasy include "forcible sodomy, strangulation, and disfigurement of the victim’s body", all acts committed by Smith. This testimony was controversial because Hatcher did not evaluate or interview the defendant but came to his conclusions solely on "profile evidence". Also, Hatcher's testimony was characterized as an improper attempt by the prosecution to sway the jury toward a death sentence on the grounds of extreme mental illness, contrary to law and precedent.

He also testified at the trial of Cameron Hooker who was accused of eight counts of kidnapping, rape and associated offenses, after kidnapping his victim and keeping her prisoner for seven years. One of Hooker's defenses was that the victim consented to stay with him and a well known expert witness testified the victim's behavior indicates she did not want to escape. In a battle of expert witnesses at Hooker's trial, Hatcher explained the victim's seemingly compliant and apathetic behavior, counteracting the defense expert's portrayal of the victim as willingly complying with Hooker's demands. Unlike the defense expert witness, Hatcher extensively interviewed the victim and was prepared to testify how each element in Hooker's treatment of the victim was capable of coercing an individual into compliant behavior. He went through each of the hypothetical facts in the case—kidnapping, hanging, whipping, being locked in a box, starvation and sensory deprivation, describing each of them as coercive techniques used by sadistic persons to control another human being. He said such a continued pattern of physical and sexual abuse would coerce most people into giving up resistance. Hatcher's testimony was essential in explaining to the jury how the victim could seem to be compliant. After the verdict was rendered and Hooker was convicted of seven of the eight counts, the judge commended the jury for their "intelligence" in accepting Hatcher's testimony rather than that of the defense expert.

Hatcher was awarded a Diplomate in Police Psychology by the Society for Police and Criminal Psychology (SPCP), the board certification in this specialty area of applied psychology.

== Publications ==
- Psychology of Child Firesetting, Brunner/Mazel (1987) ISBN 0-87630-445-5
