= Beautiful Son =

1993 single by Hole

Single by Hole
- B-side: "Old Age"; "20 Years in the Dakota"
- Released: April 1993
- Recorded: November 8–10, 1992
- Studio: Word of Mouth Productions (Seattle, Washington, U.S.)
- Genre: Grunge
- Length: 2:29
- Label: City Slang
- Songwriters: Courtney Love; Eric Erlandson; Patty Schemel
- Producer: Jack Endino

Hole singles chronology
"Teenage Whore" (1991)	"Beautiful Son" (1993)	"Miss World" (1994)

"Beautiful Son" is a song by American alternative rock band Hole, co-written by frontwoman Courtney Love, lead guitarist Eric Erlandson, and drummer Patty Schemel. The song was released as the band's fourth single in April 1993 on the European label City Slang. To coincide with the song's lyrics, Love used a photograph of her husband, Kurt Cobain, at age 7 as the single's artwork.

== Origin and recording ==
"Beautiful Son" is known to have been written as early as 1992, around the time of Courtney Love and Kurt Cobain's marriage. Love stated that the song-writing process was an attempt to "be a little dumber" and that she "was always trying to write a very complex song without ever having learned to write an easy Beatles song. It just had a riff. It wasn't super smart but it sounded good and that's when I started learning things don't have to have lots and lots of notes. That the best songs are carried by simple lines and simple melodies."

The recording sessions for the "Beautiful Son" single took place between November 8 and 10, 1992, at Word Of Mouth Productions, formerly Reciprocal Recording where "Dicknail" had been mixed, in Seattle, Washington. The assigned producer was Jack Endino, who had recorded Nirvana's debut album Bleach (1989) at the same studio four years prior. Incidentally, Cobain was due to partake in the sessions, mainly taking on bass duties, however, seeing as he arrived only on the last day, he had no contribution to the session. Rumours circulated that the Nirvana song "Talk To Me" was recorded with Cobain, however, Hole later recorded a demo version at Hanzek Audio, a related recording studio, in August 1993, during the initial recording sessions for Hole's second studio album, Live Through This (1994). Contrary to popular belief, temporary bassist Leslie Hardy did not play bass at this session, nor was she even in the band at this time. Endino played bass on "Beautiful Son", and Love played bass on "20 Years in the Dakota". Endino described the atmosphere of the session as "quite negative" and that "it was really strange, cognitive dissonance." Love was noted as being civil towards Endino, however, constantly shouting at other band members, such as one instance when Eric Erlandson pointed out that the riff to "Beautiful Son" sounded "exactly" like Nirvana's hit, "Smells Like Teen Spirit". Erlandson then tried to record it in a different style, but Love demanded "this is how it should sound." The band left before midnight on November 10. Before the band left, Endino recorded the bass parts to "Beautiful Son", then Love recorded the final bass track to "20 Years In The Dakota." "Between us we had the bass done in about a half-hour," noted Endino and finally mixed the three tracks as he was getting tired and "[didn't] want to stay [t]here 'till 6am mixing three songs."

== Composition ==
Due to Love's intentions to compose a song with "simple melodies," her initial guitar riff was developed further by Erlandson and Patty Schemel. The final riff consists of three main barre chords (B5-C5-A5) which is used for both the verses and choruses of the song. An underlying riff of the same chords, played in a higher tuning, is heard in the studio recording of the song. During the chorus, the riff is highly distorted as opposed to its thin-sounding lead during the verse. This alternating quiet-loud dynamic is typical of grunge music, such as Nirvana's "Smells Like Teen Spirit," which Erlandson drew comparisons to during the recording sessions. During the song's bridge, the song again quiets down and uses a series of notes performed on the D and G strings (E-F♯-G/B-G-B-E) before a short solo by Erlandson.

Love is reported to have written the lyrics of "Beautiful Son" about Cobain's crossdressing as a child. The single's front cover complements this as it features a photograph of a young Cobain, at the age of around 7, surrounded by gift bows designed by Love. The "friends" in the lyrics who "clean the mess" are usually seen as a reference to Krist Novoselic and Dave Grohl, other members of Nirvana.

=== Songwriting credits controversy ===
Although songwriting credits on the official release note all three songs featured on the single as being written collectively by Hole, according to BMI, "Beautiful Son" and "20 Years in the Dakota" were written by Love, Erlandson, and Schemel. However, the single's b-side "Old Age" was the subject of controversy in 1998 when it was revealed to be a Cobain composition by the Seattle newspaper The Stranger. However, prior to the publication, Love stated in an interview that "Old Age" "is partly someone else's composition. It's something somebody had a little bit of and I said 'let me have the rest of it' and I wrote this thing in it and tried to make it goth. I found it, wrote it, and recorded it the same night." In actuality, "Old Age" was initially a Cobain-penned song, and recorded during the sessions for Nevermind (1991), but after dissatisfaction with the song, gave it to Love, who then re-arranged parts of the song melodically and used entirely different lyrics.

== Release ==
According to reports, Live Through This, the follow-up to Hole's debut studio album, Pretty on the Inside (1991), was originally due to be released in January 1993 and as consolation for the unexpected delay, Hole released "Beautiful Son," however, no actual confirmation supports this. Nevertheless, "Beautiful Son" was released in the United Kingdom on City Slang in April 1993. Upon its release, it was issued in three formats: as a CD single, as a 7-inch and 12-inch vinyl, the 7-inch version does not included "Old Age"." In support of the single release, Hole performed a short three-date tour of London, United Kingdom in March 1993, performing at Rough Trade Records on March 28 and Subterrania on March 29. The band were also featured on Channel 4 music programme The Word on March 26, where the song was performed live for the first time. The song debuted on the UK Singles Chart at number 54 and remained there for one week.

The song was later released on the American version of Geffen Records 1994 compilation album, DGC Rarities, Vol.1 and on Hole's 1997 compilation album, My Body, the Hand Grenade.

== Live performances ==
The song performed live on Channel 4 music programme The Word on March 26, 1993. Recorded at Teddington Studios in London, this performance featured new bassist Kristen Pfaff and most notably, the programme's host, Mark Lamarr, incorrectly introduced the song as "Brother Son." It was also featured as regular song on setlists for the band's succeeding tours, however, was abandoned during the tours for Celebrity Skin (1998).

== Music video ==
According to Love's friend and Nirvana biographer, Everett True, a music video for "Beautiful Son" was recorded before Kristen Pfaff was recruited as the band's bassist. Describing the video, True noted in NIRVANA: The True Story that "Kurt was featured as a young child on the cover, and played bass wearing one of Courtney's dresses in the video (filmed before Kristen joined the band) - thus confirming the lyric, "You look good in my dress / My beautiful son". Although vague in its description, no evidence supports that an official promotional music video was filmed for the single and the video may be a home recording by Cobain and Love.

== Track listings ==
7-inch single

1. "Beautiful Son" (Courtney Love, Eric Erlandson, Patty Schemel) – 2:29
2. "20 Years in the Dakota" (Love, Erlandson, Schemel) – 2:54

CD and 12-inch single

1. "Beautiful Son" (Love, Erlandson, Schemel) – 2:29
2. "20 Years in the Dakota" (Love, Erlandson, Schemel) – 2:54
3. "Old Age" (Love, Kurt Cobain) – 3:34

== Credits and personnel ==
Hole

- Courtney Love – vocals, guitar, bass ("20 Years in the Dakota")
- Eric Erlandson – guitar
- Patty Schemel – drums, percussion

Technical

- Jack Endino – production, engineering, bass ("Beautiful Son")

== Charts ==
Chart (1993)	Peak position
UK Singles (OCC)	54
UK Indie Chart (Music Week)	3
