= Asking for It (Hole song) =

Song by Hole

from the album Live Through This
- Released: April 12, 1994
- Recorded: October 1993
- Studio: Triclops Studios in Marietta, Georgia
- Genre: Alternative rock; grunge
- Length: 3:28
- Label: DGC
- Songwriters: Eric Erlandson; Courtney Love
- Producers: Paul Q. Kolderie; Sean Slade

"Asking for It" is a song by the American alternative rock band Hole. It is the fourth track on the band's second studio album, Live Through This, released on April 12, 1994 on Geffen Records. The song was written by vocalist and rhythm guitarist Courtney Love and lead guitarist Eric Erlandson.

Although not released as a single, "Asking for It" is one of the band's most notable songs as it charted a brief, four-week appearance on Billboard's Modern Rock Tracks in the United States in February 1995, peaking at number 36. It is also known as one of the three released Hole recordings to feature Love's husband Kurt Cobain.

== Origin and recording ==
"Asking for It" was one of the many songs written by Love and Erlandson following the release of Hole's debut studio album, Pretty on the Inside, and the subsequent departures of drummer Caroline Rue and bassist Jill Emery.

The first and only known studio version of the song was recorded in October 1993 as part of the Live Through This sessions at Triclops Studios in Atlanta, Georgia. On October 18, halfway through the sessions, Love's husband, Kurt Cobain of Nirvana, joined the band in-studio and provided backing vocals for a number of songs, including "Asking for It". Cobain, however, was unfamiliar with the material, and was encouraged to "just sing off the top of [his] head". His vocals during the bridge are audible on the album version, albeit low in the mix. An alternate mix of the song, sourced from a radio broadcast of Hot Modern Rock Tracks in 1995, circulated amongst the general public in 1998 and features Cobain's prominent backing vocals, as well as an extended bridge and additional verses. Due to this recording, the song is known for being a source for those who believe Cobain contributed largely to the album.

== Composition ==
=== Music ===
"Asking for It" was written in drop D tuning by Eric Erlandson with the main guitar riff constructed from four chords (D5–C5–A5–G5) with the latter two chords being barre chords due to the alternate tuning. The song opens with a simple bass line based on Erlandson's chords. An acoustically-performed guitar bridge in the song resembles the Richard Hell and The Voidoids song "Time", which was later performed live by Hole during one of their 1995 tours in promotion for Live Through This.

Describing the musical style of "Asking for It", Sputnikmusic described the song as a "slower more melodic song" in contrast to the beginning of the album and "starting with some lightly strummed chords on the guitar, the drums and bass quickly join in to make a poppy yet somehow distant sound."

"'Asking for It' opens in a trough of despairing self-hate and doesn't get much cheerier," observed Clark Collis in Select. "Yet ... it's going to be a bugger getting the damn thing out of your head."

=== Lyrics ===
The lyrical content of "Asking for It" is mainly about rape, however, it also deals with issues of feminism; one of the central themes of Live Through This. The song was inspired by an incident that occurred on August 16, 1991 at the Queen Margaret Union in Glasgow, Scotland, where Love stage-dived and was molested by members of the audience. Speaking of the incident in a 1995 interview, Love said:

We had just gotten off tour with Mudhoney, and I decided to stage-dive. I was wearing a dress and I didn't realize what I was engendering in the audience. It was a huge audience and they were kind of going ape-shit. So I just dove off the stage, and suddenly, it was like my dress was being torn off of me, my underwear was being torn off of me, people were putting their fingers inside of me and grabbing my breasts really hard, screaming things in my ears like "pussy-whore-cunt". When I got back onstage I was naked. I felt like Karen Finley. But the worst thing of all was that I saw a photograph of it later. Someone took a picture of me right when this was happening, and I had this big smile on my face like I was pretending it wasn't happening. So later I wrote a song called "Asking For It" based on the whole experience. I can't compare it to rape because it's not the same. But in a way it was. I was raped by an audience, figuratively, literally, and yet, was I asking for it?

== Release ==
"Asking for It" was featured as the fourth track on Live Through This, released on April 12, 1994. Less than seven months later, the song was released, in its alternate form, to U.S. radio. and featured the additional verses, extended bridge and Cobain's backing vocals. There were rumours around the time of the album's release that Love was planning to release the version of "Asking for It" featuring Cobain as a single.

A live version of the song, performed and recorded at the 1995 Reading Festival, was released on Hole's 1997 compilation album, My Body, the Hand Grenade.

== Musicians and personnel ==
=== Hole ===
- Courtney Love – vocals, guitar
- Eric Erlandson – guitar
- Kristen Pfaff – bass guitar, piano, backing vocals
- Patty Schemel – drums, percussion

=== Guest musicians ===
- Dana Kletter – additional vocals
- Kurt Cobain – additional vocals

=== Technical personnel ===
- Paul Q. Kolderie – producer, engineer
- Sean Slade – producer, engineer
- Scott Litt – mixing

== Charts ==
Chart (1995)	Peak position
US Modern Rock Tracks (Billboard)	36
