= Softer, Softest =

1995 single by Hole

Single by Hole

from the album Live Through This
- B-side: "He Hit Me (and It Felt like a Kiss)"
- Released: January 22, 1996
- Recorded: October 1993
- Studio: Triclops Sound (Marietta, Georgia)
- Length: 3:27
- Label: DGC
- Songwriters: Courtney Love; Eric Erlandson
- Producers: Paul Q. Kolderie; Sean Slade

Hole singles chronology
"Violet" (1995)	"Softer, Softest" (1996)	"Gold Dust Woman" (1996)

"Softer, Softest" is a song by American alternative rock band Hole, written by frontwoman Courtney Love and lead guitarist Eric Erlandson. The song was released as the band's eighth song and fourth and final single from their second studio album, Live Through This (1994), in January 1996. The single was released only in Australia and the Netherlands just as the band finished their extensive touring in 1995.

== Origin and recording ==
Erlandson and Love are known to have written "Softer, Softest" as early as December 1991, at which time it was performed live during the band's tour of the United Kingdom in winter 1991. Originally known as "Pee Girl", the song developed into its final form in early 1993 when the name "Softer, Softest" was being used.

The first known studio version of "Softer, Softest" was recorded on January 21, 1993, at BMG Ariola Ltda in Rio de Janeiro, Brazil. Featuring Love on lead guitar and vocals, recently recruited drummer Patty Schemel and Love's husband Kurt Cobain of Nirvana on bass, the trio recorded the song, alongside "I Think That I Would Die" (then known as "Baby") "She Walks on Me", "Miss World" and "Closing Time", during breaks in Nirvana's session. Sound engineer Craig Montgomery stated that the songs were "half-baked ideas." Two more structured versions were recorded on March 27, 1993, with BBC DJ Mark Goodier. In October 1993, the band recorded the album version of the song as part of the Live Through This sessions at Triclops Studios in Atlanta, Georgia, where Cobain contributed background vocals towards the end of the song (2:41 onwards). Speaking of Cobain's involvement, Love has said "there are harmonies all over Live Through This that are Kurt's... you can hear him on 'Pee Girl.'" Despite his involvement, Cobain was not noted as a performer neither on the album nor the single.

== Composition and lyrics ==
During Hole's performance on MTV Unplugged on Valentine's Day 1995, Love introduced the song as "[being] about the girl that always smelled like pee in your class" and also claimed it was autobiographical and not about former MTV producer, Tabitha Soren.

Despite being credited on record as a collective authorship by all members of Hole, according to Broadcast Music Incorporated's website, the authors of the song are only Eric Erlandson and Courtney Love.

== Music video ==
A promotional music video was never recorded for "Softer, Softest", however, the version of the song performed at MTV Unplugged in 1995 was used as a music video though it did not receive a lot of airplay. Recorded by John Harris and directed by Milton Lage, the performance also featured guest musicians Ralph Carney on cello, Zeena Parkins on harp and Erik Friedlander on clarinet.

== Track listing ==
All songs written by Courtney Love and Eric Erlandson, except where noted.

Australian CD single (GED 22095)

1. "Softer, Softest" – 3:27
2. "He Hit Me (It Felt Like a Kiss)" (live) (Note: Live track recorded during MTV Unplugged set at Brooklyn Academy of Music, February 14, 1995.) (Carole King, Gerry Goffin) – 4:23
3. "Miss World" (live) (Note: Live track recorded by Chris Thompson and Leah Baker at the Palace Nightclub in Melbourne, Australia, January 13, 1995.) – 3:06
4. "Teenage Whore" (live) – 2:45
5. "Hungry Like the Wolf (live) (Simon Le Bon, Nick Rhodes, John Taylor) – 1:55

Dutch CD single (GED 22089)

1. "Softer, Softest" – 3:27
2. "He Hit Me (It Felt Like a Kiss)" (live) (King, Goffin) – 3:45

== Credits and personnel ==
Hole

- Courtney Love – lead vocals, guitar
- Eric Erlandson – guitar
- Kristen Pfaff – bass, piano, backing vocals
- Patty Schemel – drums, percussion

Guest musicians

- Dana Kletter – additional vocals
- Kurt Cobain – additional vocals

Technical

- Paul Q. Kolderie – producer, engineer
- Sean Slade – producer, engineer
- Scott Litt – mixing

== Charts ==
Chart (1995–1996)	Peak position
Australia (ARIA)	90
US Alternative Airplay (Billboard)	32
