= Jennifer's Body (Hole song) =

1994 song by Hole

Song by Hole

from the album Live Through This
- Released: April 12, 1994
- Recorded: October 1993
- Studio: Triclops Studios in Atlanta, Georgia
- Genre: Alternative rock
- Length: 3:42
- Label: DGC
- Songwriters: Courtney Love; Eric Erlandson
- Producers: Paul Q. Kolderie; Sean Slade

"Jennifer's Body" is a song written and performed by American alternative rock band Hole, from their 1994 album Live Through This.

== Origin and recording ==
According to drummer Patty Schemel, she and Courtney Love came up with the idea for the song in 1992 while in San Francisco; at the time, Love's husband Kurt Cobain was working with Melvins on their album Lysol (1992). The song was recorded at Triclops Studios in October 1993 during the recording sessions for Live Through This. Schemel recalled that the song was recorded in two takes.

== Composition and lyrics ==
The general theme of the lyrics deal with a woman's kidnapping and dismemberment. According to Everett True, the song was thought to be inspired by Jennie Boddy, a music publicist. Its lyrics appear to tell the narrative of a woman in captivity, being held "in a box by the bed", before eventually being murdered and dismembered.

=== Interpretation ===
The song has been interpreted by feminist scholars as being about literal violence against a woman's body, as well as using "corporeal fragmentation," representing a woman's body being enjoyed "piecemeal in objectified parts." The song's ending with the repeated lines "Just relax, just relax, just go to sleep," have been interpreted by feminist scholars as assuming the role of a male aggressor speaking to his female victim who is either being lulled to sleep, or experiencing death.

== Bibliography ==
- Burns, Lori and Melissa Lafrance (2002). Disruptive Divas: Feminism, Identity and Popular Music. Routledge. ISBN 978-0-81533-554-2.
- Raha, Maria (2004). Cinderella's Big Score: Women of the Punk and Indie Underground. Live Girls. Seal Press. ISBN 978-1-58005-116-3.
- True, Everett (2006). Nirvana: The Biography. Omnibus Press. ISBN 978-0-30681-554-6.
