= Teenage Whore =

- Cover artwork of 12" single

Single by Hole

from the album Pretty on the Inside
- B-side: "Drown Soda" (CD, 7", 12"); "Burn Black" (CD, 12")
- Released: September 2, 1991
- Recorded: March 1991
- Studio: Music Box Studios in Los Angeles, California, U.S.
- Genre: Grunge • noise rock
- Length: 2:59
- Label: City Slang
- Songwriters: Jill Emery; Eric Erlandson; Caroline Rue; Courtney Love
- Producers: Kim Gordon; Don Fleming

Hole singles chronology
"Dicknail" (1991)	"Teenage Whore" (1991)	"Beautiful Son" (1993)

"Teenage Whore" is a song by American alternative rock band Hole. It is the first track on the band's debut studio album, Pretty on the Inside (1991), and was released as a single in the United Kingdom on the European label, City Slang in September 1991. The single was released in both compact disc as well as 12" and 7" vinyl, with "Drown Soda" and "Burn Black" as b-sides. Though it did not chart in the United States, the single gained popularity in the United Kingdom upon its release, peaking at #1 on the UK Indie Chart in September 1991.

Recorded in March 1991 during the studio sessions for Pretty on the Inside, the track featured production by Sonic Youth's Kim Gordon and Gumball frontman Don Fleming. The song's lyrics, written by frontwoman Courtney Love, narrate a dejected teenaged prostitute who has been abandoned by her mother. Heavily influenced by noise rock and grindcore, the band's musical arrangements on the song feature rapid string muting, tritones, and a noted "sonic uncleanliness."

== History ==
=== Recording and composition ===
"Teenage Whore" was written by bassist Jill Emery, lead guitarist Eric Erlandson, drummer Caroline Rue and vocalist/rhythm guitarist Courtney Love in 1991 and was one of the first songs written by Hole's second lineup, featuring Emery, after the departure of original bassist Lisa Roberts and additional guitarist Mike Geisbrecht. It was recorded over a period of four days in March 1991 during sessions for Pretty on the Inside at Music Box Studios in Los Angeles. It was produced by Sonic Youth musician Kim Gordon and Gumball frontman Don Fleming.

The musical composition of "Teenage Whore" follows the status quo of Pretty on the Inside, which is most often noted for its extreme abrasiveness, though it is also noted for its sophisticated use of melodic structure which is buried under arrangements. Spin addressed this, saying: "at first [the song] comes across like a ranting noisy rage, but underneath is a surprisingly lush melody." The song's main verse riff follows an E-G-F chord progression, with the bridge composed of a layering of diminished fifths and muted strings, evoking a "sonic uncleanliness." As with the majority of the band's songs, the lyrics to "Teenage Whore" were written by Love, and deal with a negative self image and real or imagined perception of oneself as a "whore", which is reinforced by the narrator's mother.

=== Release ===
"Teenage Whore" was issued as a single through Hole's European label, City Slang, in September 1991 to promote Pretty on the Inside, and entered the UK Indie Chart at number 1. The song later appeared on the soundtrack of the 1994 film S.F.W.. By September 17, 1991, it was at number 2 on the UK Indie Chart, after "Head Like a Hole" by Nine Inch Nails.

The single was available on 7" vinyl on pink, clear and transparent green vinyls, with "Drown Soda" as a b-side, and on 12" vinyl and compact disc with "Drown Soda" and "Burn Black" as b-sides (both of which had been recorded during alternate recording sessions, at Fun City Studio in New York City, and Radio Tokyo in Los Angeles, respectively). (Note: Liner notes from the 1991 City Slang Teenage Whore single (SLANG 011/013) list the following recording locations on the back cover sleeve: "Teenage Whore" recorded at Music Box Studios in Hollywood, California; "Drown Soda" recorded at Fun City Studio in New York City, New York; "Burn Black" recorded at Radio Tokyo in Los Angeles, California) This marked the band's first CD release, as all of their prior singles had been released solely on vinyl. (Note: Hole's previous two singles were issued only on 7" 45 RPM records— "Retard Girl" through Sympathy for the Record Industry (SFTRI 53), and "Dicknail" through Sub Pop (SP093).)

"Burn Black" had previously been issued as a b-side on the band's previous single, "Dicknail", which had been released on Sub Pop Records in March 1991, when the band began recording Pretty on the Inside. On The Chart Show, the song's title was censored, with the word "whore" being replaced with dots.

== Critical reception ==
Music columnist Everett True referred to "Teenage Whore" as "the most unsettling thing I've heard since Patti Smith uncovered "Piss Factory" ... only it's way more personal." In the 1995 book The Sex Revolts: Gender, Rebellion, and Rock 'n' Roll, music scholars Simon Reynolds and Joy Press reflected on the track, writing: ""Teenage Whore" turns the lowliest member of rock society, the groupie, into the ultimate (anti) heroine. Love rasps out an unclassifiable alloy of growling defiance and retching disgust, while Hole's torturous music grinds out her humiliation and hatred with a creakiness that betrays how long this howl has been lurking in the back of the throat." Cultural theorist Jan Jagodzinski also reads the song as the narrative of a groupie and representing a "desublimated ugly aesthetic of the abjected mother." In The Rough Guide to Rock, the song is noted as "coercing the listener into Love's anguish" as well as representing the band's early stylistic choices and aesthetic, characterized by "drone" and featuring "poetic turns of phrase."

== In popular culture ==
The song was later featured on the official soundtrack of the film S.F.W. (1994). Comedian Jen Kirkman references the song in her book I Know What I'm Doing–and Other Lies I Tell Myself: Dispatches from a Life Under Construction (2016).

== Track listing ==
All songs written by Courtney Love, Eric Erlandson, Jill Emery, and Caroline Rue, except where noted.

German 7" single (SLANG 013)

1. "Teenage Whore" – 2:59
2. "Drown Soda" (Love, Erlandson) – 4:52

German 12" single (SLANG 011)

1. "Teenage Whore" – 2:59
2. "Drown Soda" (Love, Erlandson) – 4:52
3. "Burn Black" – 4:56

German CD single (SLANG 013)

1. "Teenage Whore" – 2:59
2. "Drown Soda" (Love, Erlandson) – 4:52
3. "Burn Black" – 4:56

== Credits and personnel ==
Hole

- Courtney Love – vocals, guitar
- Eric Erlandson – guitar
- Jill Emery – bass
- Caroline Rue– drums, percussion

Technical

- Kim Gordon – producer, engineer
- Don Fleming – producer, engineer
- Brian Foxworthy – engineering, mixing
- Wharton Tiers – engineer, mixing (on "Drown Soda")
- Jack Endino – mixing (on "Burn Black")

Art direction

- Michael Levine – photography

== Charts ==
Chart (1991)	Peak position
UK Singles (OCC)	80
UK Indie Chart	1

== Sources ==
- Azerrad, Michael (2002). Our Band Could Be Your Life: Scenes from the American Indie Underground 1981–1991. Back Bay. ISBN 978-0-316-78753-6.
- Buckley, Peter, ed. (2003). The Rough Guide Rock: The Definitive Guide to More than 1200 Artists and Bands (3 ed.). Rough Guides. ISBN 978-1-84353-105-0.
- Ditmore, Melissa Hope, ed. (2006). Encyclopedia of Prostitution and Sex Work. Vol. 1. Greenwood. ISBN 978-0-313-32968-5.
- Jagodzinski, Jan (2005). Music in Youth Culture: A Lacanian Approach. Palgrave Macmillan. ISBN 978-1-4039-6530-1.
- Kirkman, Jen (2016). I Know What I'm Doing–and Other Lies I Tell Myself: Dispatches from a Life Under Construction. Simon & Schuster. ISBN 978-1-4767-7027-7.
- Lankford, Ronald D. Jr. (2009). Women Singer-Songwriters in Rock: A Populist Rebellion in the 1990s. Lanham: Scarecrow Press. ISBN 978-0-8108-7268-4. OCLC 759928007.
- Reynolds, Simon; Press, Joy (1995). "Open Your Heart: Confessions and Catharsis from Janis Joplin to Courtney Love". The Sex Revolts: Gender, Rebellion, and Rock 'n' Roll. Harvard University Press. ISBN 978-0-674-80273-5. "The Sex Revolts: Gender, Rebellion, and Rock 'n' Roll."
- True, Everett (2001). Live Through This: American Rock Music in the Nineties. Virgin. ISBN 978-0-7535-0558-8.
- Warner, Jay (2008). Notable Moments of Women in Music. Hal Leonard. ISBN 978-1-4234-2951-7.
- Whiteley, Sheila (2000). Women and Popular Music: Sexuality, Identity and Subjectivity. Routledge. ISBN 978-0-415-21190-1.
