= Doll Parts =

1994 single by Hole

Single by Hole

from the album Live Through This
- B-side: "The Void"; "Plump" (live); "Hungry Like the Wolf" (live)
- Written: November 1991
- Released: October 10, 1994
- Recorded: October 1993
- Studio: Triclops Sound (Marietta, Georgia, U.S.)
- Genre: Alternative rock; grunge; punk rock
- Length: 3:31
- Label: DGC
- Songwriter: Courtney Love
- Producers: Paul Q. Kolderie; Sean Slade

Hole singles chronology
"Miss World" (1994)	"Doll Parts" (1994)	"Circle One / Shutdown" (1995)

Music video
- "Doll Parts" on YouTube

"Doll Parts" is a song by American alternative rock band Hole, written by vocalist and rhythm guitarist Courtney Love. The song was released as the band's sixth single and second from their second studio album, Live Through This, in October 1994 to accompany the band's North American tour. It was also the first single to be released following the death of bassist Kristen Pfaff in June 1994.

Love wrote the song in late 1991, soon after she met Kurt Cobain, and has admitted that its lyrics were about her insecurity of his romantic interest in her. It became one of the band's most popular songs, peaking on the US Billboard Modern Rock Tracks at number 4, and is considered by fans and critics alike as one of Hole's signature tracks.

In September 2021, Rolling Stone ranked the track 208 in their list of the 500 Greatest Songs of All Time.

== Background and recording ==
Courtney Love is known to have written "Doll Parts" as early as November 1991, performing it acoustically at a Hole concert in Massachusetts. The song developed into its final form less than two weeks later and became a regular number on setlists during the band's tour of Europe and the United Kingdom the following month. Journalist Everett True also noted that Love performed an acoustic version of the song to him over a telephone at 4 a.m. during the band's tour.

The first known studio version of "Doll Parts" was recorded on November 19, 1991, at Maida Vale Studios as part of Hole's first radio session with BBC DJ John Peel. A second version of the song was recorded on March 27, 1993, with Mark Goodier, another BBC radio host, during a short three-date tour of England. In October 1993, the band recorded the album version of the song as part of the Live Through This sessions at Triclops Studios in Atlanta, Georgia.

== Composition ==
"Doll Parts" thematically focuses on love, rejection, and fear of unrequited romance. Speaking to Uncut magazine in 2010, Love stated that the song was specifically about Kurt Cobain, who she thought "didn't like [her]." Love divulged that she wrote the song while staying at the Cambridge, Massachusetts apartment of Joyce Linehan, a music executive, and that she had written most of it while locked in a bathroom. Love has said that the line "dog beg" was worked into the first verse because there was literally a dog in the apartment begging for food.

I had to write most of the lyrics on my arm in Sharpie as I ran out of paper. People were pounding on the door as I wrote it. It was played for the first time about an hour later, at the Virgin megastore in Boston. It was about a boy [Cobain], whose band had just left town, who I'd been sleeping with, who I heard was sleeping with 2 other girls, it was my way of saying 'You’re a fucking idiot if you don’t choose ME, and here is all the desire and fury and love that I feel for you'. Good songs don’t always come in 20 minutes but the force was strong and that one did. Anyway, I married that guy.

The title of the song and the lyrical meaning are inspired by an encounter Love had with Cobain in 1991 prior to their relationship and marriage. Love had sent Cobain "a heart-shaped box scented with perfume and inside a porcelain doll, three dried roses, a miniature teacup and shellac-covered seashells" to apologize for their first meeting in May 1991, at which she wrestled Cobain. The box, purchased in an antique store in New Orleans, was later the influence for the Cobain-penned Nirvana song, "Heart-Shaped Box." The lyrics reflect Love's initial, rejected feelings about Cobain's lack of communication most acutely conveyed in the line, "He only loves those things because he loves to see them break."

"Doll Parts"
Love's distinctive vocals and simple composition are given prominence in the album version

After Cobain's death in April 1994, "Doll Parts" took on a more tragic meaning with Love giving anguished performances of the song on tour. Drummer Patty Schemel has said that "certain things would remind her, a lot of the time on-stage, and it would just come out. Certain lyrics had a lot more meaning."

The song comprises just three chords: A, Cmaj7, and G. Love noted its simplicity: "I still don't understand why that one song with just three chords is such a big thing, but it's definitely got some good lyrics."

On Live Through This and the single, the song is credited to Hole as a band. According to BMI's website, the official author is solely Love.

"Sometimes I could listen day in and day out and hardly hear an honest line. There's being really low, and then there's pretending to be low because it's trendy to be miserable. There's so much falseness in that stuff. There's a line in a Courtney song that stopped me: 'I fake it so real, I am beyond fake.' That, at least, has an element of truth and revelation in it." – Joni Mitchell

== Release ==
"Doll Parts" was released on October 10, 1994, in Australia and on November 15 in the United States as the second single from Hole's second studio album, Live Through This (1994). In Australia, a CD single and a cassette single were issued through Geffen Records, while in the US, it was released as a CD, cassette, and 7-inch single on DGC Records, with alternate track listings for each pressing. Upon its release in Europe, three CD singles were released on DGC, Geffen, and City Slang, with additional live recordings.

The song became Hole's highest-charting song in the United States, peaking at number 58 on the Billboard Hot 100 in January 1995 chart. "Doll Parts" also peaked at number four on the Billboard Modern Rock Tracks chart in December 1994. The song later charted on Canada's RPM Singles Chart, the UK Singles Chart, Belgian Singles Chart in Wallonia, and the French Singles Chart.

== Music video ==
Doll symbolism and a child resembling Cobain are prominent in the song's music video

The music video for "Doll Parts" was directed by Samuel Bayer—who had also directed music videos for The Smashing Pumpkins and Nirvana—and who Hole commissioned following the death of bassist Kristen Pfaff. Jennifer Finch of L7 is featured as the bassist in the video. Bayer has said that he wanted it "evoke the feeling of death" and used ideas conceived by Love throughout the video.

Love's ideas included a large amount of doll imagery, herself "in a babydoll dress looking demure while playing guitar on a bed" and "walking in a bleak backyard passing a children's table set for a tea party." Bayer designed the garden scenes to be "decaying" and added "a hundred plaster-wrapped dolls dangling from trees." Other scenes features a young blonde boy, a reference "meant to invoke Kurt [Cobain]", and footage of the band performing the song. Most of the video was shot in black-and-white and interspersed with various color shots. Two edits of "Doll Parts" have been broadcast—an original edit and a "producer's version."

The video for "Doll Parts" was nominated for Best Alternative Video at the 1995 MTV Video Music Awards but lost to "Buddy Holly" by Weezer.

== Track listings ==
All songs were written by Courtney Love, except where noted.

US 7-inch single (DGCS7-19379)

1. "Doll Parts" – 3:31
2. "Plump" (live) (Note: Recorded at the Universal Amphitheater on December 10, 1994.) (Love, Eric Erlandson) – 2:42

UK 7-inch single (GFS 91)

1. "Doll Parts" – 3:31
2. "The Void" (Ana da Silva, Gina Birch) – 2:57

US cassette single (DGCCS-19379)

1. "Doll Parts" – 3:31
2. "Plump" (live) (Note: Recorded at the Universal Amphitheater on December 10, 1994.) (Love, Eric Erlandson) – 2:42

UK CD single (GFSTD 91)

1. "Doll Parts" – 3:31
2. "The Void" (Da Silva, Birch) – 2:57
3. "Hungry Like the Wolf" (live) (Simon Le Bon, Nick Rhodes, John Taylor) – 1:42

UK CD single (GFSXD 91)

1. "Doll Parts" (Love) – 3:31
2. "Plump" (live) (Love, Erlandson) – 2:42
3. "I Think That I Would Die" (live) (Note: Recorded at the Hollywood Palladium on November 9, 1994.) (Love, Erlandson, Kat Bjelland) – 4:22
4. "Credit in the Straight World" (live) (Stuart Moxham) – 2:49

== Credits and personnel ==
All personnel credits adapted from Live Through This's liner notes.

Hole

- Courtney Love – vocals, guitar
- Eric Erlandson – guitar
- Kristen Pfaff – bass, piano, backing vocals
- Patty Schemel – drums, percussion

Production

- Paul Q. Kolderie – producer, engineer
- Sean Slade – producer, engineer
- Scott Litt – mixing

== Charts ==
Chart (1994–1995)	Peak position
Australian Singles Chart	136
Belgian Singles Chart (Wallonia)	28
Canadian RPM Singles Chart	75
Eurochart Hot 100	54
French SNEP Singles Chart	45
Icelandic Singles Chart	29
UK Singles Chart	16
US Billboard Hot 100	58
US Billboard Modern Rock Tracks	4
US Cash Box Top 100	61

== Certifications ==
Region	Certification	Certified units/sales
United States (RIAA)	Gold	500,000^{‡}
^{‡} Sales+streaming figures based on certification alone.

== Release history ==
Region	Date	Format(s)	Label(s)	Ref.
Australia	October 10, 1994	CD; cassette	Geffen	
United States	November 15, 1994	7-inch vinyl; cassette	DGC	
United Kingdom	April 3, 1995	7-inch vinyl; CD	Geffen; City Slang	

== Cover versions ==
English trip hop artist Tricky covered the song on his 2017 album Ununiform under the title "Doll", featuring Avalon Lurks.

Miley Cyrus covered the song live on the Howard Stern Show in December 2020. Love praised the cover as a "sweet version", and said she was "touched" by the gesture.

== Bibliography ==
- Creswell, Toby (2007). 1001 Songs. Hardie Grant Publishing. ISBN 978-1-74066-458-5.
- Cross, Charles R. (2001). Heavier Than Heaven. Hodder and Stoughton. ISBN 0-340-73939-8.
- Harris, Andrea L.; McAllister Ulrich, John (2003). GenXegesis: Essays on Alternative Youth (Sub)culture in the 1990s. Popular Press. ISBN 978-0-87972-862-5.
- True, Everett (2006). Nirvana: The True Story. Omnibus Press. ISBN 1-84449-640-6.
