= Miss World (song) =

1994 single by Hole

Single by Hole

from the album Live Through This
- B-side: "Rock Star" (alt. mix); "Do It Clean"; "Over the Edge"
- Released: March 21, 1994
- Recorded: October 1993
- Studio: Triclops Sound (Marietta, Georgia, U.S.)
- Genre: Alternative rock; grunge; punk rock
- Length: 2:58
- Label: Tim/Kerr (US); City Slang (UK)
- Songwriter(s): Courtney Love; Eric Erlandson
- Producer(s): Paul Q. Kolderie; Sean Slade

Hole singles chronology
"Beautiful Son" (1993)	"Miss World" (1994)	"Doll Parts" (1994)

Music video
- "Miss World" on YouTube

"Miss World" is a song by the American alternative rock band Hole, written by frontwoman Courtney Love and lead guitarist Eric Erlandson. The song was released as the lead single from their second studio album, Live Through This, on March 21, 1994.

The single was released in the United States on Tim/Kerr Records, an independent label in Portland, Oregon, on a 7-inch pink vinyl, as well as a limited edition picture disc pressing paired with the band's cover of the Wipers' "Over the Edge". City Slang released CD and vinyl versions of the single in Europe, both with "Rock Star" (Alternate Mix) as a B-side. A music video for the song was directed by Sophie Muller in March 1994 and released in promotion with the single.

== Origin and recording ==
Erlandson and Love wrote "Miss World" in summer 1992 after the departure of former band members Jill Emery and Caroline Rue. An early version of the song, recorded with drummer Patty Schemel and Love's husband and Nirvana frontman Kurt Cobain, was recorded in BMG Ariola Ltda in Rio de Janeiro, Brazil, on January 21, 1993. Featuring Love on lead guitar and vocals, recently recruited drummer Patty Schemel, and Cobain on bass, the trio recorded the song, alongside others such as "She Walks on Me", "Softer, Softest" and "Closing Time", during breaks in Nirvana's session. Sound engineer Craig Montgomery stated that though some songs were "half-baked ideas", "'Miss World' was a fairly complete song at that point" and "'the most fleshed out song' of the session."

The band played the song live on July 15 and 16, 1993, during their performances at the Clapham Grand in London and at the Phoenix Festival in Stratford-upon-Avon, respectively. The official album version of the song was recorded as part of the Live Through This sessions at Triclops Studios in Marietta, Georgia, in October of that year.

== Composition and lyrics ==
"Miss World" is known to deal with themes of self-image and substance abuse. Speaking of the song, reviewer Tim Grierson stated that "'Miss World' ties a deceptively candy-coated melody to a sad tale of drug abuse and distorted body image as Love hits upon a familiar theme of the album: the dichotomy of how ugly you feel on the inside while trying to appear beautiful to others." Select's Clark Collis observed: "'Miss World' treads similar ground to Juliana Hatfield's 'Supermodel' – only, naturally, about 10,000 times more virulently."

The lyrics expand on the main theme of self-image with the opening lines containing "I am the girl you know, so sick I cannot try" and later lyrics relating to suffering. The use of the term "kill me pills" is inspired by, and also a reference to, Anne Sexton, who, after overdosing on pentobarbital, and other barbiturates, called the drugs "kill me pills." Bassist Kristen Pfaff had a minor input in the lyrical composition contributing the chorus lines "I made my bed, I'll lie in it / I made my bed, I'll die in it" from a song, "Limited Edition," she had written earlier in her career with Janitor Joe.

On both Live Through This and the individual single, the song is credited on record as written by Hole as a band, however according to BMI's website, the official authors are Courtney Love and Eric Erlandson.

Love's character in the video is almost identical to the character portrayed on the front artwork for Live Through This. Self-image is a major theme of the album and "Miss World" especially.

The European single version of the song had b-sides featuring an alternative mix of "Rock Star" (mislabeled from the original title of the song, "Olympia") with multiple vocal tracks from Courtney Love playing simultaneously, giving it a sound reminiscent of cheerleading chants. This version of the song (which is a satire on the riot grrrl movement) has even more satirical lyrics than the album version on Live Through This: "When I went to school in Olympia/And everyone's the same/What do you do with a revolution?/You just forget your name/When I went to school in a fascist state/And everyone's the same/We took punk rock, and we got a grade."

The UK release of the single also featured a live cover of "Do It Clean" by Echo and the Bunnymen, while the US pressing featured a cover of "Over the Edge" by the Wipers.

In later years, the track has been covered by Neverending White Lights musician Daniel Victor, as well as American alternative rock band The Afghan Whigs. The song appeared in an episode of Daria, "The Lawndale File".

== Music video ==
Prior to the single's release, a promotional music video for "Miss World" was recorded in Los Angeles, California, in February 1994. It is the only music video by Hole that features bassist Kristen Pfaff. Directed by Sophie Muller, best known later for No Doubt's "Don't Speak" video, the video features the band performing the song at a beauty pageant, in which Love is seen as the title character, Miss World; pampering herself, receiving flowers, being crowned, adored by fans and eventually crying onstage. The video is heavily influenced by the style and decorations of the 1976 film Carrie. Much of the latter image bears striking resemblance to the cover of Live Through This.

== Track listings ==
All songs were written by Courtney Love and Eric Erlandson, except where noted.

European 7-inch single (EFA 04936-7)

1. "Miss World" – 2:58
2. "Rock Star" (alternate mix) (Note: "Rock Star" is a misprint of the song "Olympia", which is featured in its place on Live Through This.) – 2:33

UK CD single (EFA 04936-2)

1. "Miss World" – 2:58
2. "Rock Star" (alternate mix) – 2:33
3. "Do It Clean" (live) (Note: Recorded live at the Clapham Grand in London, United Kingdom on July 15, 1993.) (Will Sergeant, Ian McCulloch, Les Pattinson, Pete de Freitas) – 1:26

US 7-inch single (TK947081)

1. "Miss World" – 2:58
2. "Over the Edge" (Greg Sage) – 2:48

== Credits and personnel ==
Personnel credits are adapted from Live Through This's liner notes.

Hole

- Courtney Love – vocals, guitar
- Eric Erlandson – guitar, composition
- Kristen Pfaff – bass, piano, backing vocals
- Patty Schemel – drums, percussion

Guest musician

- Dana Kletter – additional vocals

Production

- Paul Q. Kolderie – production, engineering
- Sean Slade – producer, engineer
- Scott Litt – mixing

== Charts ==
Chart (1994)	Peak position
Australian ARIA Singles Chart	57
Canadian RPM Singles Chart	89
UK Singles Chart	64
US Billboard Modern Rock Tracks	13
