= Live Through This =

Studio album by Hole
- Released: April 12, 1994
- Recorded: October 8–31, 1993
- Studio: Triclops Sound (Marietta, Georgia)
- Genre: Alternative rock • grunge • punk rock
- Length: 38:16
- Label: DGC
- Producers: Paul Q. Kolderie; Sean Slade

Hole chronology
Pretty on the Inside (1991)	Live Through This (1994)	Ask for It (1995)

Singles from Live Through This
- 1. "Miss World" Released: March 21, 1994; 2. "Doll Parts" Released: October 10, 1994; 3. "Violet" Released: July 17, 1995; 4. "Softer, Softest" Released: January 22, 1996 (Aus)

Live Through This is the second studio album by the American alternative rock band Hole, released on April 12, 1994, by DGC Records. Recorded in late 1993, it departed from the band's unpolished hardcore aesthetics to more refined melodies and song structure. Frontwoman Courtney Love said that she wanted the record to be "shocking to the people who think that we don't have a soft edge", but maintain a harsh sensibility. The album was produced by Sean Slade and Paul Q. Kolderie and mixed by Scott Litt and J Mascis. The lyrics and packaging reflect Love's thematic preoccupations with beauty, and motifs of milk, motherhood, anti-elitism, and violence against women, while Love derived the album title from a quote in Gone with the Wind (1939).

Live Through This was met with critical acclaim, and charted in nine countries before being certified platinum in the US in April 1995. Despite this, it was also the subject of some public discussion regarding unsubstantiated rumors that Love's husband, Kurt Cobain—who died by suicide less than one week before the album's release—helped ghostwrite the album. This claim has been disputed by band members, producers, and music biographers, though the band confirmed that Cobain sang additional backing vocals on two tracks during a visit to the studio. It was also the only Hole album to feature bassist Kristen Pfaff, and the final album to be released during her lifetime, as she died two months after the album's release.

In critical circles, Live Through This is considered a contemporary classic, and was included in Rolling Stone's 2020 updated list of The 500 Greatest Albums of All Time at number 106. It has also been featured in the book 1001 Albums You Must Hear Before You Die and was ranked number 84 on NME's The 500 Greatest Albums of All Time list. As of 2010, it has sold over 1.6 million copies in the US.

== Background ==
Hole released their debut studio album, Pretty on the Inside, in 1991. Despite moderate sales, the album was a critical success among English and American press. In March 1992, following the album tour, drummer Caroline Rue and bassist Jill Emery left the band due to artistic differences. In April 1992, vocalist Courtney Love and guitarist Eric Erlandson arranged auditions for a drummer at the Jabberjaw in Los Angeles and recruited drummer Patty Schemel. Following the 1992 Rodney King riots in Los Angeles, Love, Erlandson, and Schemel relocated to a Carnation, Washington home owned by Love and her husband, the Nirvana frontman Kurt Cobain, and began rehearsing and writing new material. "We had been going more pop, less journal-entry noise stuff," said Erlandson. Love said: "I was very competitive with Kurt because I wanted more melody. But I already wanted that before Live Through This."

Originally signed to Caroline Records in the United States and City Slang in Europe, Hole began record deal negotiations with Geffen Records in early 1992. In February 1992, they signed a seven-album deal with Geffen subsidiary DGC Records, reportedly with "an advance of a million dollars and a royalty rate considerably higher than Nirvana's". On November 8, 1992, Hole recorded "Beautiful Son", "20 Years in the Dakota" and "Old Age" at Word of Mouth Recording in Seattle with producer Jack Endino. The songs were released in April 1993 as Hole's fourth single on the City Slang label. On January 21, 1993, Love and Schemel recorded five demos at BMG Ariola Ltda. in Rio de Janeiro, Brazil. Produced by Craig Montgomery, the session had originally been scheduled as a demo session for Nirvana, who were recording material for their upcoming studio album In Utero (1993). During breaks in Nirvana's session, Love and Schemel recorded a number of songs later featured on Live Through This, including "Miss World", "She Walks on Me", "I Think That I Would Die" and "Softer, Softest".

In 1993, the band recruited former Janitor Joe bassist Kristen Pfaff, an accomplished cellist and classically trained musician who brought a new level of professionalism to the group. Erlandson said of Pfaff's membership: "That's when we took off, all of a sudden we became a real band." After a brief tour of the United Kingdom in mid-1993, the band sent a series of demos to the record label. "When we got the Live Through This demos, I realized very quickly that Hole had gotten a new rhythm section," said producer Sean Slade. "It was much more musical."

== Recording ==
The recording sessions for Live Through This began on October 8, 1993, at Triclops Sound Studios in Marietta, Georgia. The studio was booked at the recommendation of the Smashing Pumpkins, who had recorded their second studio album, Siamese Dream (1993), there. Hole hired the producers Paul Q. Kolderie and Sean Slade, as she and Cobain had enjoyed their work with Radiohead on their 1993 album Pablo Honey. Erlandson recalled that Hole continued to write material throughout the recording sessions over the ensuing weeks: "We never finished writing; we were writing the whole time, trying to come up with more and more songs because even though it looked like we had a good, solid album, we knew we were missing some pieces. We were still writing intensely and frantically putting songs together. It wasn't like, "Oh we have these 12 songs, they're done, and we're going to go in and record now.""

The first week of recording was spent recording basic tracks, including drums, bass, scratch guitars, and scratch vocals. After basic tracks were completed, Cobain visited Hole in the studio before Nirvana were set to tour to promote In Utero. The band invited Cobain to sing backing vocals on several tracks, which he initially refused, as he was unfamiliar with the material. When Cobain asked, "How can I sing on it if I haven't heard it?", Love answered by encouraging him to "just sing off the top of [his] head". Cobain provided backing vocals on "Asking for It" and "Softer, Softest". Kolderie said Cobain sang on around five tracks, but could not remember which. After taking a break for dinner, the session devolved into a jam with Cobain on drums, Love and Erlandson on guitars and Slade on bass.

Musician Dana Kletter sang backing vocals on seven songs, including "Violet", "Miss World", "Asking for It", "Doll Parts", "Softer, Softest", and "She Walks on Me". Slade said, "I think one of the reasons that 'Doll Parts' might have been a hit is that harmony Dana does on the 'You will ache like I ache' part, it's almost like an Appalachian close harmony against what Courtney is doing. It's very melancholic." Slade and Koderie avoided double tracking Love's vocals, as they felt it "took the fierceness away". Certain imperfections were also left in the final mixes, including Love's voice cracking in "Doll Parts", which Geffen executives had asked to be removed.

According to Schemel, an employee at Triclops Sound Studios introduced the band to crystal meth. Schemel, her brother Larry Schemel and Pfaff engaged in intense drug usage during recording. "Miss World" was one of the songs Schemel and Pfaff recorded while high and Schemel said "that song was recorded a bit altered". Slade said that the basic tracks were completed within five days, and that Pfaff's basslines were completed on the basic tracks: "This has never happened on an album that we've done in all these years — every single bass track on Live Through This was from the basic tracks. There was no bass overdubs because there was no need to because they were perfect." Love completed between ten and twelve tracks of vocals for each song, which were then arranged by Slade and Kolderie.

The band finished recording on October 31, after which production and mixing lasted an additional nineteen days. The album was mixed by Scott Litt in Los Angeles and Seattle, except for "Gutless", which was mixed by J Mascis of Dinosaur Jr. in New York City.

== Composition ==
=== Music ===
"[This record is] so different that there should have been a record in between. I didn't want a punk rock record— I did that. So it's very melodic, and there are a lot more harmonies [...] We played on Halloween, and all these weird purists showed up. Total fans, but every time we'd go into one of our pop songs, they'd start chanting, "Don't do it! Sellout!" Girls were throwing riot grrrl zines at me and stuff. I was like "Uh, I'm really glad you're here, girls, but check it out: I can write a bridge now.""

— Courtney Love, Rolling Stone, December 1993

Live Through This marked a departure from the band's noise rock roots toward a more alternative rock format. Love had sought a more mellow sound for Live Through This, stating: "I want this record to be shocking to the people who don't think we have a soft edge, and at the same time, [to know] that we haven't lost our very, very hard edge." The resulting music was starkly less aggressive than the band's former work, blending more structured melodies and smoother arrangements with heavy guitar riffs. "During the tour for Pretty on the Inside, we had been going more pop, less journal-entry noise stuff," recalled Erlandson. "The whole industry was going, like, "Look, you can be melodic and punky and be successful!" We never said, "Let's do this, let's copy this formula." It was natural."

Consequently, Live Through This featured a mixture of songwriting techniques, including use of power chords as well as arpeggios, and occasional use of keyboards. Musically, the album's content ranged from heavier rock tracks such as "Plump" and "Violet" (noted by Rolling Stone for its "startling gunshot-guitar chorus") to slower and more mellow rock ballads, such as "Doll Parts" and "Softer, Softest", which featured the use of twelve-string electro-acoustic guitars and more stripped-down progressions and strumming.

A great deal of the songs on the album were written over a two-year period by Love, Erlandson, and Schemel, in both Los Angeles as well as in a makeshift studio Love had set up at her and Cobain's secluded home in Carnation, Washington. Love also stated that "half the fucking songs were written in the studio." According to Love, the songwriting process for the album was "really easy": "We started at [defunct L.A. punk club] Jabberjaw. I wrote "Violet" there. Then we moved to Seattle in the middle of that. "Miss World" was written in Seattle, if I remember correctly... We had this great rehearsal space [in Seattle]: It was just perfect, up on Capitol Hill, near the Urban Outfitters. Everyone got really close. There was just a great flow." Love also stated that she had been listening to The Breeders, Pixies, Echo and the Bunnymen, and Joy Division while recording the album, and that their work served as primary influences on her at the time.

The album features one cover song, "Credit in the Straight World" by Welsh post-punk band Young Marble Giants; the band's frontman, Stuart Moxham reportedly "hated" Hole's version of the song, saying they had turned it into a "pornographic Led Zeppelin track".

=== Lyrics and themes ===
Though several lyrics featured on Live Through This make direct references to Love's personal life, when reflecting on writing them, she felt the record was "not as personal" as the band's previous work: "You know, when women say, "Well, I play music, and it's cathartic," that applies to me to a degree, but I just wanted to write a good rock record. I would love to write a couple of great rock songs in my life, like Chrissie Hynde did. If you write something that will transcend a long period of time and make people feel a certain way, there's really nothing like that." Recurrent themes noted on the record by critics and journalists include those of motherhood, depression, body image, child abuse, and elitism, as well as motifs of milk, pregnancy, and suicide.

The album's opening track, "Violet", was inspired by Love's relationship with Billy Corgan, while the tracks "Plump", "Miss World", and "I Think That I Would Die" contain repeated themes of motherhood and post-partum depression. "I Think That I Would Die" makes specific references to the custody battle which Love and husband Cobain had endured over their daughter, Frances Bean Cobain, in 1992; according to Love, the line "She says, 'I am not a feminist'" in the song was directly quoted from a Julia Roberts interview that she had read in a magazine. "Asking for It" was inspired by an occurrence at a 1991 concert when Hole was touring with Mudhoney, in which Love was assaulted and had her clothes ripped off of her while crowdsurfing, leaving her entirely naked, and was written entirely during the album's recording sessions. "Doll Parts", the album's most successful single, was written by Love in music executive Joyce Linehan's apartment in Boston, Massachusetts in 1991, and was inspired by Love's insecurity of Cobain's romantic interest in her.

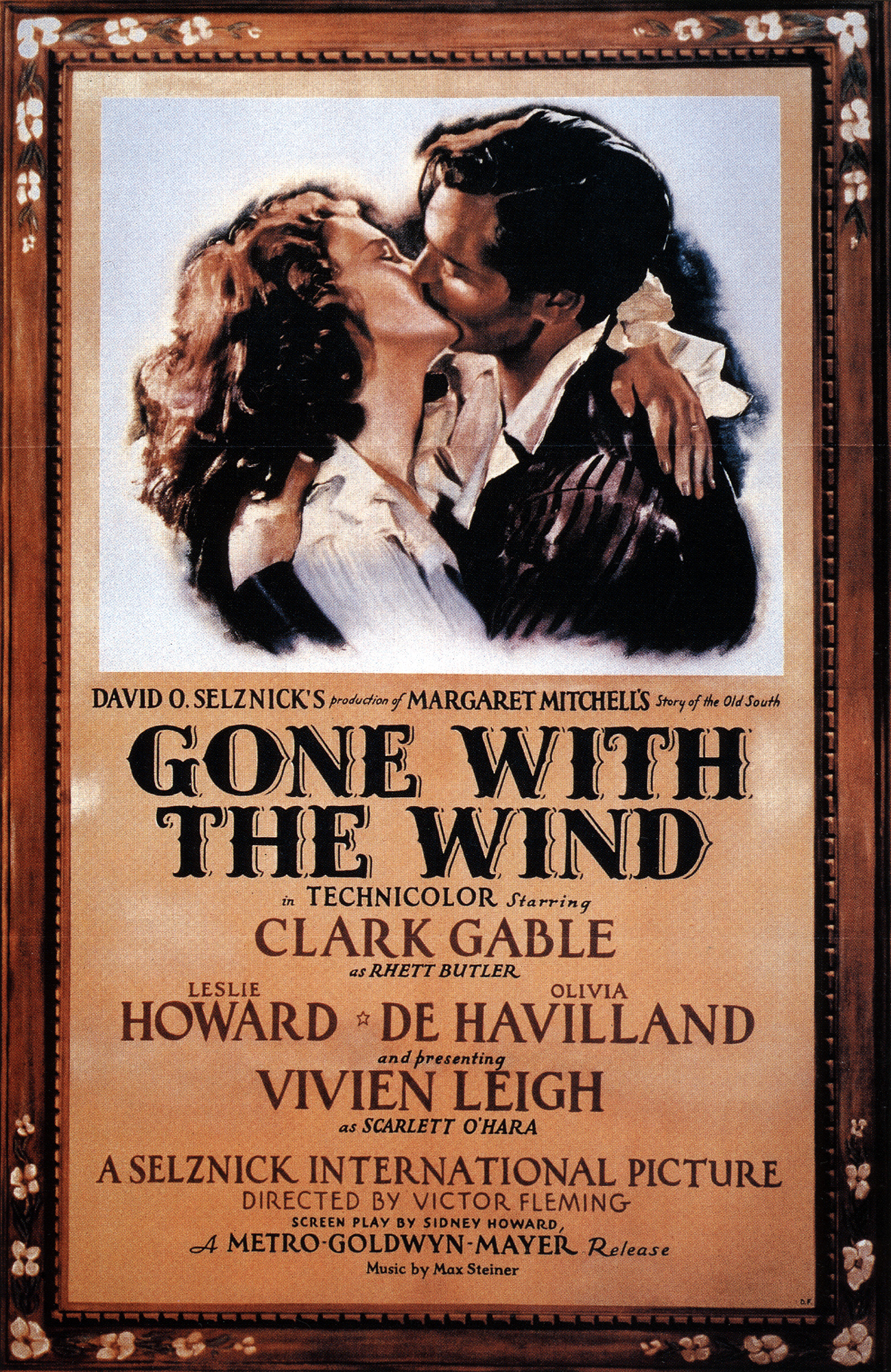
Courtney Love derived the album's title from a quote in the film Gone with the Wind (1939)

Love also drew on other filmic and literary influences while writing the album's lyrics: The phrase "live through this" in "Asking for It", which later became the album title, is derived from a quote in Gone with the Wind (1939), and the phrase "kill-me pills" references poet Anne Sexton, who, after overdosing on barbiturates and pentobarbital, called the drugs "kill-me pills". The refrain in "Plump" in which Love sings, "I'm eating you. I'm overfed" also bears similarity to a line from Sexton's poem "The Ballad of the Lonely Masturbator", which reads: "They are eating each other. They are overfed."

Well, I went to school in Olympia, and everyone's the same
And what do you do with a revolution?
You just forget your name
Well, I went to school in a fascist state and everyone's the same
We took punk rock, and we got a grade

— Lyrics to an alternate mix of "Olympia", mislabeled as "Rock Star" on the album's official release

A song entitled "Rock Star" was originally slated to close the album, but a last-minute decision was made to replace the track with "Olympia". Since the artwork had already been printed, however, the title of "Rock Star" remained and was also used for further releases. The track lyrically mocks the riot grrrl music scene of the Evergreen State College in Olympia, Washington, criticizing "the hive mind of the Olympia scenester... nonconformist outsiders... [who] ended up in a culture of homogeneous punk conformity." Alternate mixes of the song that later were released as B-sides included even more satirical lyrics, such as "we took punk rock, and we got a grade."

In summarizing the record's themes, Spin noted:

Live Through This is both a scruffier and more commercial record than Pretty on the Inside. The angsty rants of yore remain, but they're decorated with a lot more poetry. Milk (as in mother's) is a recurring motif, as is dismemberment. Female victimization remains the overall theme, this time depersonalized into odd, accusatory mini-narratives in which a variety of female characters receive the protection of Love's tense, manic-depressive singing. Hers is a natural songwriting talent, full of excellent instincts, and yet wildly unsophisticated.

== Packaging and artwork ==
The album's back artwork features a childhood photo of Love in Springfield, Oregon

Fashion model Leilani Bishop is shown on the cover of the album, shot by photographer Ellen von Unwerth, dressed in beauty pageant attire with a tiara and a bouquet of flowers, with mascara running down her eyes in tears of joy. Love stated in an interview that she "wanted to capture the look on a woman's face as she's being crowned... this sort of ecstatic, blue eyeliner running, kind of 'I am, I am—I won! I have hemorrhoid cream under my eyes and adhesive tape on my butt, and I had to scratch and claw and fuck my way up, but I won Miss Congeniality!'" The band logo introduced on the front cover of the album shares stylistic similarity to the contemporary Mattel Barbie logo.

The back cover of the album features a family photo of Courtney Love during her childhood in Springfield, Oregon, with the individual track listings appearing to the right, printed on embossing tape. Music scholar Ronald Lankford commented on the contrast between the images on the front and back cover, interpreting the back image of Love as symbolizing the "antithesis of the contest winner on the cover. The young girl, then, seems to represent femininity in its natural state, before the fall of adolescence."

== Release ==
Live Through This was released on April 12, 1994, by DGC Records on compact disc and cassette in North America. Overseas, the album received a short-lived LP pressing by City Slang on a standard black vinyl and a limited white vinyl. The album was dedicated to the memory of Joe Cole, a roadie for Black Flag and the Rollins Band who was shot to death in a December 1991 robbery after attending a Hole concert at the Whisky a Go Go.

The album debuted on the U.S. Billboard 200 at number 55, eventually peaking at number 52 in January 1995 during its 68-week stay. In December 1994, the record went gold, having sold a total of 500,000 copies, and went platinum six months later for having sold one million copies. As of 2010, the album had sold more than 1.6 million copies in the United States and has well over 2 million worldwide. It has also achieved platinum status in Canada and Australia.

In June 1994, just before Hole was scheduled to embark on an international tour to support the album, bassist Pfaff was found dead in her Seattle apartment of a heroin overdose. The tour was subsequently postponed until the end of the summer, after which Melissa Auf der Maur, a Canadian bassist from Montreal, was hired to join the band and accompany them on tour.

Four singles were released from the album and three promotional videos were shot, for "Miss World" (still with Kristen Pfaff), "Doll Parts" (with L7's bassist Jennifer Finch replacing her) and "Violet" (already with Melissa Auf der Maur). "Softer, Softest" was also released as a single, and Hole's performance of this song at their MTV Unplugged session was used as a promotional video.

=== Authorship myths ===
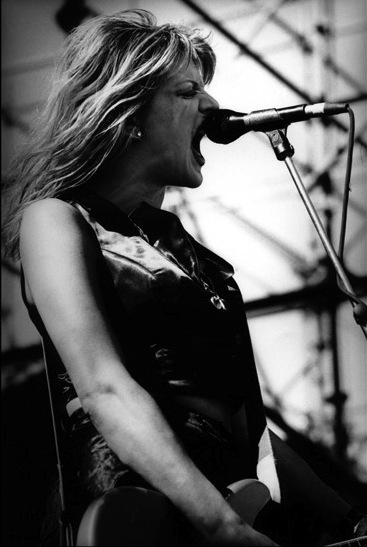
Upon the album's release, rumors circulated that Courtney Love's deceased husband, Kurt Cobain, had co-written several of its tracks

Following the album's release, rumors began circulating alleging that Love's recently deceased husband, Cobain, had ghostwritten some of the songs. Although these rumors circulated for years to follow, multiple songs on Live Through This had been written and performed during Hole's Pretty on the Inside tour: Both "Violet" and "Doll Parts", among other tracks, were written in 1991 during the release of Pretty on the Inside. The first studio recordings of the songs took place during a BBC Radio broadcast for John Peel in 1991, in between US and European tours to promote Pretty on the Inside; these recordings would later appear on the group's 1995 EP Ask for It.

In a 2006 Time magazine piece, it was noted that "[the rumors] started immediately that it was Cobain, not his wife, Courtney Love, who wrote the majority of these churningly catchy songs. Forget that there's no proof, that their marriage was collaborative and that it's a nasty thing to say, Live Through This is clearly a woman's work [and is] far more swaggering than any album any grunge man ever came up with. When Love sings, "I went to school in Olympia / Where everyone's the same," it's obvious she thinks she's not, and that she's right." Stephen Thomas Erlewine of AllMusic wrote that the main reason Live Through This marked a drastic sonic departure from Pretty on the Inside (a reason cited in arguments that it had been ghostwritten) is "Love's desire to compete in the same commercial alternative rock arena as her husband... while [Cobain having ghostwritten] is unlikely, there's no denying that his patented stop-start dynamics, barre chords, and punk-pop melodies provide the blueprint for Live Through This. Love adds her signature rage and feminist rhetoric to the formula."

"Kurt sang backing vocals on two songs. He wrote one B-side for Hole ("Old Age"), uncredited. And that was it. It would be just as accurate – and misleading – to say that Courtney Love wrote most of Nirvana's third album, In Utero: you can certainly see her influence in Kurt's lyrics. Before the pair met, it was often guesswork as to his intentions. Afterwards, his lyrics were far more direct."

— Journalist Everett True on the songwriting allegations

Love made several responses to the songwriting allegations, first in 1998: "All this time I have never addressed this. But here I am finally saying for the very first time that Kurt did not [write] Live Through This. I mean for fuck's sake, his skills were much better than mine at the time – the songs would have been much better. That's the first thing." Love later addressed the issue, stating: "I wanted to be better than Kurt. I was really competing with Kurt. And that's why it always offends me when people would say, "Oh, he wrote Live Through This." I'd be proud as hell to say that he wrote something on it, but I wouldn't let him. It was too Yoko [Ono] for me. It's like, "No fucking way, man! I've got a good band, I don't fucking need your help." Drummer Patty Schemel, a longtime friend of Cobain's, also denied this, commenting in 2011: "There is that myth that Kurt wrote a lot of our songs— it's not true. Eric [Erlandson] and Courtney wrote Live Through This." Although the band members denied Cobain's involvement in the songwriting, they have openly stated that Cobain was briefly in the studio and performed uncredited backup vocals with Kristen Pfaff on two of the tracks: "Asking for It", and "Softer, Softest". Cobain biographer Charles R. Cross conducted interviews with everyone associated with the making of the record, and found that all parties agreed that Love and Erlandson wrote the songs.

The album's liner notes collectively credit Hole as the sole composers of the album, aside from two tracks: "I Think That I Would Die", on which Kat Bjelland served as a co-writer, and "Credit in the Straight World", a Young Marble Giants cover written by Stuart Moxham. However, according to the BMI (Broadcast Music Incorporated) repertoire, the songwriting credits of the majority of the album's tracks belong solely to Courtney Love and Eric Erlandson, while "Doll Parts" is credited to Love alone.

== Critical reception ==
Professional ratings
Review scores
Source	Rating
AllMusic	4/5 stars
Blender	5/5 stars
Chicago Tribune	3.5/4 stars
Christgau's Consumer Guide	A
Entertainment Weekly	B+
NME	8/10
Pitchfork	10/10
Rolling Stone	4/5 stars
The Rolling Stone Album Guide	5/5 stars
Spin	9/10
The Virgin Encyclopedia of Nineties Music	4/5 stars

Lauded by critics and periodicals, Live Through This appeared in annual best-of lists. It was ranked the number one album of 1994 by critics in Rolling Stone, Spin, the Los Angeles Times, and the Village Voice's annual Pazz & Jop critics' poll. It was also named among the best five albums of the year by Canadian publications, including the Edmonton Journal and the Toronto Star.

Rolling Stone noted, "Love delivers punk not only as insinuating as Nirvana's but as corrosive as the Sex Pistols'. More significantly, Live Through This may be the most potent blast of female insurgency ever committed to tape." Entertainment Weekly awarded the album a B+: "What Live Through This makes perfectly clear… is that Love is a greater star. She has charisma and attitude to burn, and she knows it." NME called the album "a personal but secretive thrash-pop opera of urban nihilism and passionate doublethinks." Melody Maker hailed it "the high watermark of the genre that survived the crass label of 'foxcore'."

In The Village Voice, Robert Christgau noted the album's less caustic sound than Pretty On The Inside but praised Love's songwriting: "Punk aesthetic or no punk aesthetic, Courtney Love's songs wouldn't be compromised and might be deepened by steeper momentum and more articulate guitar noise. But they prevail anyway. Their focus is sexual exploitation, and not just by the media, evil straights, and male predators of every cultural orientation. She's also exploited by Courtney Love, and not only does she know it, she thinks about it."

Musician Magazine wrote, "[Kurt] Cobain's much-discussed, little heard other half finally gets the chance to escape gossip-column purgatory and succeeds with flying colors... Courtney Love's foul, funny eloquence… cuts through all the bullshit with a mighty flourish." This sentiment was reassessed in a 2008 BBC review of the album: "In 1994 and the years that followed, tragedy and controversy seemed to overshadow everything Courtney Love touched. Thankfully, with every year that passes, it becomes easier to put the record's emotional baggage to one side and appraise it on the strength of its songs."

"Since the last Hole LP … Courtney has learnt the art of writing a decent pop hook," observed Select's Clark Collis. "Disgorging your cathartic trauma in the studio is an admirable pastime but if you really want to compete with Corgan, Vedder or even Cobain, then the Top 40 is still where it's at."

"Although for the most part Hole rarely stray from now familiar grunge territory," noted Q, "on tracks like 'Softer Softest' and 'Miss World' they mine a rich vein of twisted country."

Spin awarded Live Through This a 9/10 rating, noting, "Love rode her band's gargantuan riffs through a shy loner's air-guitar fantasy: rock stardom as revenge upon the entire human race."

== Legacy ==
AllMusic praised the "raw pain" of the lyrics and described the album as an attempt to "compete in the commercial alternative rock arena", stating that notwithstanding the lyrical rawness, "Live Through This rarely sounds raw because of the shiny production and the carefully considered dynamics. Despite this flaw, the album retains its power because it was one of the few records patterned on Nevermind that gets the formula right, with a set of gripping hooks and melodies that retain their power even if they follow the predictable grunge pattern." John Peel listed it among his top twenty favorite albums of all time in 1997.

In 2003, Rolling Stone included Live Through This in its list of The 500 Greatest Albums of All Time, ranking it at number 466, with the ranking climbing slightly to number 460 in the 2012 revision. For the 2020 reboot of the list, the album's ranking shot up to number 106. In 2011, Kerrang! included the album in its "666 Albums You Must Hear Before You Die!" list. It was also included in Time magazine's All-Time 100 Albums list, as well as the book 1001 Albums You Must Hear Before You Die (2006). NME ranked Live Through This 84th in its list of the 500 all-time greatest albums, published in 2013. In May 2014, Loudwire placed Live Through This at number seven on its "10 Best Hard Rock Albums of 1994" list. The album was also ranked at number 15 in Guitar World magazine's "Superunknown: 50 Iconic Albums That Defined 1994" list. Spin named Live Through This 6 on their list Spin: Top 90 Albums of the 90's and 19 on their list Spin 100 Greatest Albums 1985–2005. The album is ranked number 980 in the All-Time Top 1000 Albums (3rd. edition, 2000).

In 2018, Pitchfork writer Sasha Geffen rated the album a ten out of ten, praising the "juxtaposed visceral imagery with catchy, vituperative sloganeering" with the album "switching gears between repulsion and attraction at a moment’s notice, bombarding the listener with noise and then sweetly luring them back in." Geffen concludes: "[Courtney] Love makes a bid for universality on Live Through This in that it’s hard not to get swept up in her energy, but she also acknowledges that female pain is marked, that it is compartmentalized and dismissed because it is felt by women, not people." In 2019, Rolling Stone ranked the album at number four on its list of the 50 greatest grunge albums. In 2024, Rolling Stone ranked the album's cover at number 13 on its list of the 100 best album covers of all time.

== Commercial performance ==
In the United States, Live Through This peaked at number 52 on the US Billboard 200 chart, and spent 68 weeks on the chart, making it the band's longest charting album in the US. It was ranked at number 86 on the year end chart of the Billboard 200. It was certified Platinum in the US in 1995 with one million copies sold. The album has sold 1.6 million copies in the US to date.

The album peaked at number 13 in the UK and charted for 17 weeks. It was certified Gold in the UK in 2013, with 100,000 copies sold. In Australia, it peaked at number 13 and spent 16 weeks on the chart. It was certified Gold in the country, with 70,000 copies sold.

== Track listing ==
All tracks are written by Courtney Love and Eric Erlandson, (Note: While the liner notes of the album denote Hole as the collective songwriters, the Broadcast Music Incorporated repertoire credits Courtney Love and Eric Erlandson as the sole writers of the majority of the album's songs, excluding tracks 7 (a cover written by Stuart Moxham), 8 (co-written by Kat Bjelland), and 6 (written by Love alone).) except where noted

Live Through This track listing
No.	Title	Writer(s)	Length
1.	"Violet"		3:24
2.	"Miss World"		3:00
3.	"Plump"		2:34
4.	"Asking for It"		3:29
5.	"Jennifer's Body"		3:42
6.	"Doll Parts"	Love	3:31
7.	"Credit in the Straight World"	Stuart Moxham	3:11
8.	"Softer, Softest"		3:28
9.	"She Walks on Me"		3:24
10.	"I Think That I Would Die"	Love; Erlandson; Kat Bjelland	3:36
11.	"Gutless"		2:15
12.	"Rock Star (Olympia)"		2:42
Total length:			38:16

- "Rock Star" is a mislabel of the outtake "Olympia". (see Composition)

== Personnel ==
Hole

- Courtney Love – lead vocals, rhythm guitar
- Eric Erlandson – lead guitar
- Kristen Pfaff – bass, backing vocals, piano
- Patty Schemel – drums

Guest musicians

- Dana Kletter – additional vocals (1, 2, 4, 6, 8, 9)
- Kurt Cobain – backing vocals (4, 8)

Technical

- Paul Q. Kolderie – producer, engineer
- Sean Slade – producer, engineer, mixing (3, 6, 7, 9, 10, 12)
- Scott Litt – mixing (1, 2, 4, 5, 8 at Record One, Los Angeles, and Bad Animals, Seattle)
- J Mascis – mixing (11 at Sear Sound, New York City)
- Bob Ludwig – mastering

Design

- Robin Sloane – creative direction
- Janet Wolsborn – art direction
- Ellen von Unwerth – photography (front artwork, portraits)
- Frank Rodriguez – photography (back artwork)
- Juergen Teller – inlay artwork
- Margaret Morton – inlay artwork

== Charts ==
=== Weekly charts ===
Weekly chart performance for Live Through This
Chart (1994–1995)	Peak position
Australian Albums (ARIA)	13
Belgian Albums (Ultratop Flanders)	13
Belgian Albums (Ultratop Wallonia)	8
Canada Top Albums/CDs (RPM)	29
Dutch Albums (Album Top 100)	29
European Albums (Music & Media)	67
German Albums (Offizielle Top 100)	39
Scottish Albums (Official Charts)	27
Swedish Albums (Sverigetopplistan)	22
UK Albums (Official Charts)	13
US Billboard 200	52

=== Year-end charts ===
Year-end chart performance for Live Through This
Chart (1995)	Position
Belgian Albums (Ultratop Flanders)	69
Belgian Albums (Ultratop Wallonia)	76
Canada Top Albums/CDs (RPM)	35
US Billboard 200	86

== Certifications ==
Certifications for Live Through This
Region	Certification	Certified units/sales
Australia (ARIA)	Platinum	70,000^{^}
Canada (Music Canada)	Platinum	100,000^{^}
United Kingdom (BPI)	Gold	100,000^{^}
United States (RIAA)	Platinum	1,600,000
^{^} Shipments figures based on certification alone.
