= Eric Erlandson =

American musician, guitarist, and writer

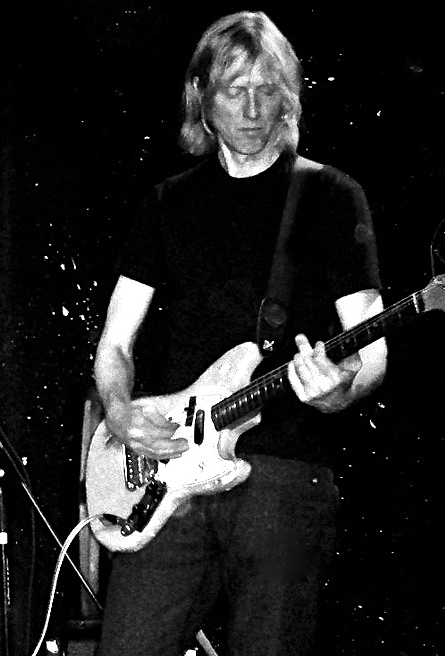
- Erlandson performing in 2012

Background information
- Born: Eric Theodore Erlandson; January 9, 1963 (age 63); Los Angeles, California, U.S.
- Genres: Alternative rock; noise rock; experimental rock
- Occupations: Musician; songwriter; producer; author
- Instruments: Guitar; banjo; synthesizer
- Years active: 1989–present
- Labels: Sympathy for the Record Industry; Caroline; City Slang; DGC

Eric Theodore Erlandson (born January 9, 1963) is an American musician, guitarist, and writer, primarily known as a founding member, songwriter and lead guitarist of alternative rock band Hole from 1989 to 2002. He has also had several musical side projects, including Rodney & the Tube Tops, which he formed with Thurston Moore of Sonic Youth, and RRIICCEE with Vincent Gallo.

Erlandson published a poetry and prose book entitled Letters to Kurt in 2012.

== Early life ==
Erlandson was born January 9, 1963 in Los Angeles, one of seven children in a "close-knit" Roman Catholic family. He is of Swedish, German, and Irish descent. Erlandson and his siblings were raised in the Los Angeles community of San Pedro.

Erlandson studied economics with a minor in marketing at Loyola Marymount University, where his father, Theodore Erlandson, served as dean of the College of Liberal Arts and Sciences, and earned a Bachelor of Science degree.

In the late-1980s, Erlandson was working as an accountant for Capitol Records, where he managed Paul McCartney's, Tina Turner's, and various other artists' royalties. In 1988, Erlandson traveled Europe for a number of months "trying to decide what he wanted to do with his life".

== Career ==
=== 1989–2002: Hole ===
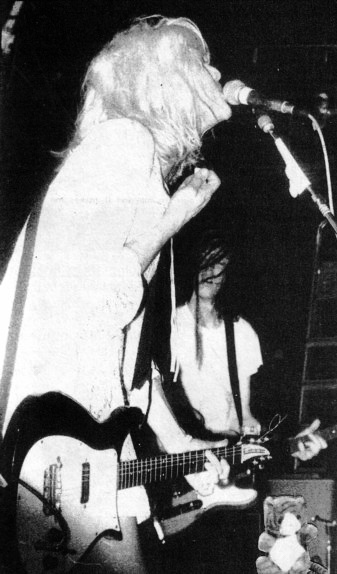
Erlandson (right) performing with Courtney Love in Hole, c. 1989

In 1989, Erlandson responded to an advertisement placed by Courtney Love in Recycler, a local classified ad paper. Erlandson describes the band's first rehearsal session, which featured original bassist Lisa Roberts, as follows:

These two girls show up dressed completely crazy, we set up and they said, "okay, just start playing something". I started playing and they started screaming at the top of their lungs for two or three hours. Crazy lyrics and screaming. I said to myself, "most people would just run away from this really fast". But I heard something in Courtney's voice and lyrics.

The band's first album, Pretty on the Inside, was released in September 1991 to positive reception from underground critics, branded "loud, ugly and deliberately shocking", and earned a spot on Spin's "20 Best Albums of the Year" list. It was also voted album of the year by New York's Village Voice and peaked at number 59 on the UK albums chart. The album spawned one single, "Teenage Whore", which entered the UK Indie Chart at number one.

Erlandson and Love began writing new material for a second Hole album in 1992. The band's major label debut, Live Through This was released on April 12, 1994. The album was a critical success and spawned several popular singles, including "Doll Parts", "Violet", and "Miss World", going multi-platinum and being hailed "Album of the Year" by Spin magazine. Live Through This is ranked by Time magazine as one of the top 100 albums of all time,

The band embarked on a worldwide tour throughout late 1994 and for the duration of 1995, with appearances at the KROQ Almost Acoustic Christmas, Saturday Night Live, the Big Day Out festival, MTV Unplugged, the 1995 Reading Festival, Lollapalooza 1995, and at the MTV Video Music Awards, where they were nominated for the "Doll Parts" music video.

Recorded over a ten-month period, Hole's third studio album, Celebrity Skin (1998), adopted a complete new sound for the band, incorporating elements of power pop, and had Love drawing influences from Fleetwood Mac and My Bloody Valentine. Celebrity Skin was a critical success with strong sales and successful singles, including the title track, "Celebrity Skin", "Malibu", and "Awful". The album received largely positive reviews, with praise from music periodicals such as Rolling Stone, NME, and Blender, as well as a four-star review from the Los Angeles Times. The album peaked at number 9 on the Billboard 200, and garnered the band its first and only number 1 single, "Celebrity Skin", which topped the Modern Rock Tracks. "Malibu", released December 29, 1998, was the album's second single; it charted at number 3 on the Modern Rock Tracks.

The band's final release was a single for the movie Any Given Sunday (1999). "Be a Man", released in March 2000, was an outtake from the Celebrity Skin sessions. In 2002, Love and Erlandson officially disbanded Hole via a message posted on the band's website.

=== 2003–2008: White Flag and RRIICCEE ===
Following Hole's disbandment, Erlandson contributed to Melissa Auf der Maur's debut solo album Auf der Maur, playing guitar on the track "Would If I Could". He toured with his friend Bill Bartell's band, White Flag, and wrote, produced and performed two shows with a group including singer/songwriter John Wolfington and drummer Blackie Onassis from Urge Overkill.

In 2007, Erlandson formed an improvisational music project, RRIICCEE, with Corey Lee Granet, and Vincent Gallo. The band toured the United States and Canada between 2007 and 2008.

=== 2009–present: other projects and possible Hole reunion ===
In 2009, Love announced that her upcoming solo album, Nobody's Daughter, was being released under the name Hole and described the band's reunion, which included Love's guitarist Micko Larkin replacing Erlandson. Auf der Maur was first to respond to the news, describing it as "jeopardis[ing] a real Hole reunion" and Erlandson stated that he and Love "have a contract", which was later revealed to be a contract preventing either from reforming Hole without mutual involvement. In a later interview, just days before the expected release of Hole's Nobody's Daughter, Erlandson explained how "[Courtney's] management convinced me that it was all hot air and that she would never be able to finish her album. Now I'm left in an uncomfortable position."

In April 2012, Erlandson published a poetry and prose book entitled Letters to Kurt.

Also in April 2012, Courtney Love joined Erlandson, bassist Melissa Auf der Maur, and drummer Patty Schemel onstage for the first time in 15 years at the after party for the premiere of Schemel's documentary entitled Hit So Hard. The band played two songs that evening, "Miss World" from the band's hit album Live Through This and a cover of The Wipers song "Over the Edge".

In April 2014, Love confirmed that she had been rehearsing new material with Erlandson, Schemel, and Auf der Maur, and that a reunion of the 1994 lineup of the band was being prepared. In May 2019, Love confirmed that all the members are definitely "talking about it", in reference to regrouping and reforming the band. In October 2019, Love posted a since-deleted photo of the group together, rehearsing songs in Los Angeles, but without Erlandson.

== Personal life ==
Erlandson has practiced Nichiren Shoshu Buddhism since 1992. During his tenure in Hole in the 1990s, Erlandson was romantically involved with the group's bassist Kristen Pfaff until her death in June 1994. Erlandson has also dated actress Drew Barrymore and Courtney Love.
