= Hole discography =

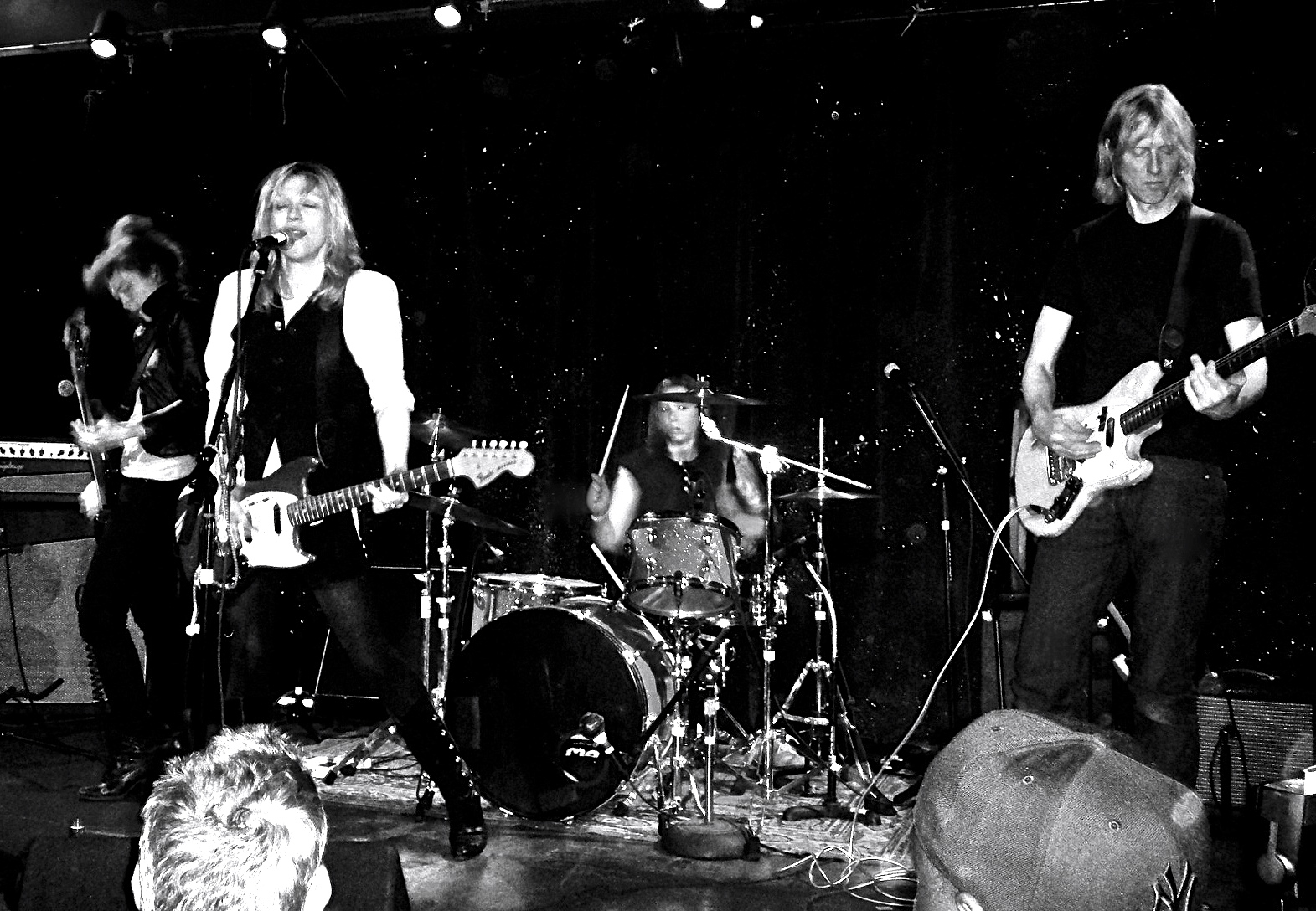
- Hole performing live in 2012.
- Studio albums: 4
- Extended plays: 3
- Compilation albums: 1
- Singles: 16
- Music videos: 12
- Miscellaneous: 15
- Unofficial label releases: 4

The discography of Hole, a Los Angeles–based American alternative rock band, consists of four studio albums, one compilation album, three extended plays, and 16 singles.

Hole was formed in 1989 by vocalist and rhythm guitarist Courtney Love and lead guitarist Eric Erlandson. The band went through a number of line-up changes before recruiting bassist Jill Emery and drummer Caroline Rue in early 1990. The band signed to the independent label Caroline Records and its European subsidiary City Slang, and released its debut studio album, Pretty on the Inside, in September 1991. Pretty on the Inside was a critical success, especially in the United Kingdom, where the album's lead single, "Teenage Whore", peaked at number 1 in the UK Indie Chart.

Following negotiations with a number of major labels, Hole signed a seven-album contract with DGC Records in 1992. Due to creative differences, Emery and Rue left the band prior to the deal and were replaced by Kristen Pfaff and Patty Schemel, respectively. Hole released its major label debut Live Through This in April 1994. A critical and commercial success, Live Through This was released a week after the death of Love's husband, Kurt Cobain, and two months prior to the death of bassist Kristen Pfaff. The band postponed the album's supporting tour and recruited bassist Melissa Auf der Maur. After constant touring in support of Live Through This's release, Hole went on a hiatus in 1995. In 1998, the band released its third studio album, Celebrity Skin, which debuted at number 9 on the Billboard 200. Following the tour in support of the album, Auf der Maur left the band and joined The Smashing Pumpkins in 2000, and Love and Erlandson disbanded Hole in May 2002.

In 2009, Love announced that her second studio album, Nobody's Daughter, was due to be released as Hole's fourth studio album and announced the band's reformation. Although Erlandson claimed that no reformation was possible for legal reasons, Hole released Nobody's Daughter worldwide on April 23, 2010. The album received mixed critical response and was a commercial failure. In 2013, Love announced that Hole was "dead", and that she was abandoning the moniker and returning to recording and performing as a solo artist.

Hole's studio albums alone have sold over 3 million copies in the United States, according to Nielsen SoundScan. Live Through This and Celebrity Skin have been certified platinum in the United States and Canada, and certified gold in Australia. "Malibu", a single from Celebrity Skin, has also been certified gold in Australia.

== Albums ==
=== Studio albums ===
Title	Details	Peak chart positions										Sales	Certifications (sales thresholds)
Title	Details	US	AUS	AUT	CAN	FRA	GER	NLD	SWE	SWI	UK	Sales	Certifications (sales thresholds)
Pretty on the Inside	Released: September 17, 1991; Label: Caroline; Format: CD, CS	—	—	—	—	—	—	—	—	—	59	US: 200,000	
Live Through This	Released: April 12, 1994; Label: DGC; Format: CD, CS	52	13	—	29	—	39	29	22	—	13	US: 1.6 million; Worldwide: 2 million	RIAA: Platinum; ARIA: Platinum; BPI: Gold; MC: Platinum
Celebrity Skin	Released: September 8, 1998; Label: Geffen; Format: CD, CS, LP	9	4	15	3	24	21	62	10	26	11	US: 1.4 million; CAN: 150,000	RIAA: Platinum; ARIA: 2× Platinum; BPI: Gold; MC: Platinum
Nobody's Daughter	Released: April 23, 2010; Label: Mercury/Island Def Jam; Format: CD, DI, LP	15	50	45	11	44	61	—	25	37	46	US: 33,000	
"—" denotes a release that did not chart.

=== Compilation albums ===
Title	Details	Peak chart positions
Title	Details	UK
My Body, the Hand Grenade	Released: October 28, 1997; Label: City Slang (04995-2); Formats: CD, LP	82

=== Live albums ===
Title	Details
Grease Your Hips	Released: January 22, 2016; Label: Let Them Eat Vinyl (LETV399LP); Formats: CD, LP

== Extended plays ==
Title	Details	Peak chart positions	
Title	Details	US	AUS
Ask for It	Released: September 12, 1995; Label: Caroline (1470-1), Virgin^{[I]} (20025); Format: CD, LP, CS	172	183
The First Session	Released: August 26, 1997; Label: Sympathy (053); Format: CD	—	—
Awful: Australian Tour EP	Released: 1999; Label: Geffen (97058); Format: CD	—	44
"—" denotes a release that did not chart.

=== Promotional extended plays ===
Title	Details
Selections from Live Through This	Released: March 1994; Label: Geffen (4635); Format: CS
Extracts from Celebrity Skin	Released: August 1998; Label: Geffen (SAM155); Format: CD
Sampler 5 Titres^{[II]}	Released: March 2010; Label: Mercury; Format: CD

- I Virgin Records released "Ask for It" in Japan and Canada.
- II Only released in France.

== Singles ==
Year	Song	Peak chart positions										Certifications	B/W	Album
Year	Song	US	US Alt.	US Main.	AUS	CAN	FRA	NLD	NZL	SWE	UK	Certifications	B/W	Album
1990	"Retard Girl"	—	—	—	—	—	—	—	—	—	—		"Phonebill Song"/"Johnnie's in the Bathroom"	Non-album single
1991	"Dicknail"	—	—	—	—	—	—	—	—	—	—		"Burn Black"	Non-album single
1991	"Teenage Whore"	—	—	—	—	—	—	—	—	—	80		"Drown Soda"/"Burn Black"	Pretty on the Inside
1993	"Beautiful Son"	—	—	—	—	—	—	—	—	—	54		"20 Years in the Dakota"/"Old Age"	Non-album single
1994	"Miss World"	—	13	—	57	89	—	—	—	—	64		"Rock Star" (alternate mix)	Live Through This
1994	"Doll Parts"	58	4	—	136	75	45	—	—	—	16	RIAA: Gold	"The Void"	Live Through This
1995	"Violet"	—	29	—	110	—	—	45	—	—	17	RIAA: Gold	"Old Age"	Live Through This
1995	"Softer, Softest"	—	32	—	90	—	—	—	—	—	—		"He Hit Me (And It Felt Like a Kiss)"	Live Through This
1996	"Gold Dust Woman"	—	31	—	87	—	—	—	—	—	—			The Crow: City of Angels soundtrack
1998	"Celebrity Skin"	85	1	4	24	1	64	—	33	43	19	RIAA: Platinum; BPI: Gold	"Best Sunday Dress"	Celebrity Skin
1998	"Malibu"	81	3	16	11	16		—	38	—	22	ARIA: Gold	"Drag"	Celebrity Skin
1999	"Awful"	—	13	—	44	—	—	—	—	—	39			Celebrity Skin
2000	"Be a Man"	—	—	—	102	—	—	—	—	—	—			Any Given Sunday soundtrack
2010	"Skinny Little Bitch"	—	19	35	180	—	—	—	—	—	—		"Codine"	Nobody's Daughter
2010	"Pacific Coast Highway"	—	—	—	—	—	—	—	—	—	—			Nobody's Daughter
2010	"Letter to God"	—	—	—	—	—	—	—	—	—	—			Nobody's Daughter
"—" denotes a release that did not chart.

=== Split singles ===
Year	Single	Other artist	Notes
1994	"Circle One / Shutdown"	Monkeywrench	Hole are credited as "The Holez"
1996	"Gold Dust Woman/Spit"	NY Loose	
1998	"Celebrity Skin/Closing Time"	Semisonic	
1998	"Malibu/Tropicalia"	Beck	
1998	"I Don't Like the Drugs (But the Drugs Like Me)/Malibu"	Marilyn Manson	

== Other charted songs ==
Year	Song	Peak chart positions	Album
Year	Song	US Alt.	Album
1995	"Asking for It"	36	Live Through This

== Music videos ==
Year	Title	Director(s)
1991	"Garbage Man"	—N/a
1993	"Beautiful Son"^{[I]}	—N/a
1994	"Miss World"	Sophie Muller
1994	"Doll Parts"^{[II]}	Samuel Bayer
1995	"Violet"	Mark Seliger and Fred Woodward
1996	"Gold Dust Woman"	Matt Mahurin
1998	"Celebrity Skin"	Nancy Bardawil
1998	"Malibu"	Paul Hunter
1999	"Awful"	Jeff Richter
2000	"Be a Man"	Joseph Kahn and Joe Rey
2011	"Samantha"	Alphan Eseli

- I Unreleased music video recorded in early 1993, featuring Nirvana frontman Kurt Cobain.
- II Two edits of "Doll Parts" exist, the second being known as the "Producer's Version."

== Miscellaneous ==
Year	Song	Album	Notes
1992	"Dicknail"	Revolution Come and Gone	Previously released as 1991 single, "Dicknail"
1993	"Over the Edge"	Eight Songs for Greg Sage and the Wipers	Cover of a song by the Wipers. Later featured on Ask for It EP.
1994	"Beautiful Son"	DGC Rarities, Vol. 1	Previously released as 1992 single, "Beautiful Son"
1994	"Rock Star" (alternate version)	Jabberjaw Compilation: Good to the Last Drop	This song is an alternate mix of "Olympia", referred to as "Rock Star" here to match the printing mistake on Live Through This
1995	"Drown Soda"	Tank Girl (soundtrack)	1991 Peel session recording of the song, also released on the Ask for It EP. The original studio version was first released on the 1991 "Teenage Whore" single, and a live version was released on the compilation album My Body, the Hand Grenade.
1996	"Gold Dust Woman"	The Crow: City of Angels (soundtrack)	Cover of a 1977 Fleetwood Mac song. Released as a single and included on The Crow: City of Angels soundtrack. Later released as a split single with NY Loose track "Spit".
1996	"Circle One"	A Small Circle of Friends: Germs (Tribute)	Cover of 1978 track by The Germs from their EP Lexicon Devil. Hole appears on the album as "The Holez", and Love plays bass on the track instead of guitar. Also released as a split single with "Shutdown" by Monkeywrench.
1997	"Dicknail"	Nowhere (soundtrack)	Previously released as 1991 single, "Dicknail".
1998	"Phonebill Song"	Their Sympathetic Majesties Request: A Decade of Obscurity and Obsolescence (1988–1998)	Previously released as B-side of "Retard Girl" single, and on The First Session and My Body, the Hand Grenade.
1999	"Retard Girl"	Alright, This Time Just the Girls	Previously released as 1990 single, "Retard Girl".
1999	"Heaven Tonight"	Never Been Kissed (soundtrack)	Previously released on Celebrity Skin.
1999	"Doll Parts" (live)	The Best of KROQ's Almost Acoustic Christmas	Live version of the song.
1999	"Best Sunday Dress"	Much at Edgefest 1999	Previously released on "Celebrity Skin" single and the Japanese edition of Celebrity Skin; was originally written in 1985 in Love's band The Pagan Babies with Kat Bjelland.
2000	"Be a Man"	Any Given Sunday (soundtrack)	Released as single, "Be a Man", and appeared on Any Given Sunday soundtrack
2000	"It's All Over Now, Baby Blue"	"Malibu" (single)	Cover of a 1965 Bob Dylan song, released on some editions of "Malibu" single.
2009	"Violet"	Jennifer's Body (soundtrack)	Previously released on Live Through This.

== Unofficial label releases ==
Year	Title	Type	Format	Other artist(s)	Label	Notes
1992	Sugar and Spice	Split album	LP	Babes in Toyland	Foxcore Records	
1993	"Kool Thing/Teenage Whore" (live)	Split single	LP	Sonic Youth	Snack Cake Discs and Desserts	Released in Sweden, titled Gooey on the Inside
1995	MTV Unplugged & Even More	Album	CD		UP01	Recorded at Hole's MTV Unplugged performance at the Brooklyn Academy of Music on February 14, 1995
2013	Hole and Courtney Love' Greatest Fucking Hits (1991–2010)	Album	CD, digital download	Courtney Love	Hellbound Records	

== See also ==
- Courtney Love discography
- Melissa Auf der Maur discography
