= Samantha (Hole song) =

- Digital release artwork

Song by Hole

from the album Nobody's Daughter
- Released: April 23, 2010
- Recorded: 2010
- Studio: Henson, Hollywood
- Genre: Alternative rock
- Length: 4:16
- Label: Mercury
- Songwriters: Billy Corgan; Courtney Love; Linda Perry
- Producers: Michael Beinhorn; Micko Larkin

"Samantha" is a song by the American alternative rock band Hole. It is the fifth track on the band's fourth studio album, Nobody's Daughter, released on Mercury Records on April 23, 2010. Written by vocalist Courtney Love, The Smashing Pumpkins frontman Billy Corgan and music producer Linda Perry, "Samantha" was originally planned as the album's lead single. "Skinny Little Bitch" was later released as the album's lead single on March 12, 2010, and "Samantha" did not receive a single release reputedly due to the controversy over its composition.

Despite not receiving a single release, a music video for "Samantha" was released in September 2011. Directed by Pablo Ganguli and Alphan Eseli, it was Hole's first music video since "Be a Man" in 2000 and is set in a post-apocalyptic world with Love wearing a wedding dress with the word "cunt" embroidered on it, burning dollar bills. A high-definition version of the video leaked on social media web site Vimeo prior to its official release.

== Origins and recording ==
"Samantha" is one of twenty-six original songs that Courtney Love wrote following her six-month lockdown in rehab in September 2005 after violating drug probation. With additional musical input from Billy Corgan and Linda Perry, the song was composed and recorded in 2006 during the embryonic sessions for Love's expected second solo studio album, How Dirty Girls Get Clean, at Perry's recording studios, the Kung Fu Gardens, in North Hollywood. An in-studio rehearsal recording of "Samantha" from these sessions was featured in an episode of All Things Considered and broadcast online by NPR in May 2007. A rough studio recording of the song from these sessions has circulated online in MP3 format. Three months prior to the NPR interview, Love announced that "Samantha" and other songs, including "I See Red", "Too Much Dope" and the eventually-included song "Honey", were possible inclusions on the album, now retitled Nobody's Daughter. The album was reported to have been completed in June 2007.

Due to further delays in production and a reported scrap of the album, "Samantha" was reworked throughout the 2008-2009 recording sessions for Nobody's Daughter. It was during these sessions that the song was described as what "[led] to the resurrection of Hole" and in June 2009, Love and guitarist Micko Larkin announced the band's reunion. In a video interview accompanying the announcement, recorded by English music magazine NME, a reworked version of "Samantha" was previewed alongside a rough version of "Nobody's Daughter." This version, recorded at Henson Recording Studios in Los Angeles, California, was changed lyrically one last time before the final album version of the song premiered on March 30, 2010, on Stereogum and was later released on Nobody's Daughter in April 2010.

== Composition and lyrics ==
As on Hole's "Celebrity Skin", Billy Corgan composed the main guitar riff to "Samantha" whilst rehearsing with Love at The Village Recorder in Los Angeles. Corgan's lead guitar recording, originally featured on a studio version of the song, was omitted from the final mix by Love and replaced with a cello. Composed in standard tuning, the song's opening chords (A-Am) are featured on numerous occasions throughout the song, usually on the first lines of a verse. The following progression (C-F-C) is incorporated into the opening riff to form the basic verse structure. The pre-chorus consists of two parts (Dm-C-A-Asus2)/(G-F-D9) and the main chorus follows a standard three-chord progression (A-F5-C5), two of which are power chords. The album version of the song, featuring the "through villages of ether" refrain, also has a pre-bridge verse that does not follow the formula of the previous verses (A9-C-G-D7). The bridge follows a four-chord progression (F-Dm-A-C) repeated twice and ending partway through a third repeat on the same chord as the pre-chorus ending.(F-D9) The final two verses are complex, with the lines "people like you / fuck people like me /" rehashing the same four chords as "Nobody's Daughter" (Em-G5-C5-A/A9) and the pre-bridge being repeated.

"Samantha"
The intro riff to "Samantha" was composed by Billy Corgan.

Lyrically, the song's character and meaning are both ambiguous. According to the All Things Considered episode aired in May 2007, the song was intended to be "about a working girl named Samantha" which "will join the canon of great rock songs about women, such as Sting's "Roxanne" or Fleetwood Mac's "Rhiannon." However, in an April 2010 interview with Amazon.com, Love implied that the song was semi-autobiographical, stating that "it's probably me" and that the character was "coming from [her] own space."

=== Billy Corgan co-writing controversy ===
Co-writer Billy Corgan has claimed that the song, along with others such as "Pacific Coast Highway", cannot be released without his approval, saying that he "has not signed off on any of those songs" and "so it would be a real big problem." Hole's music attorney, Peter Paterno, has since called Corgan's block as "an unlitigated issue" and "suspects the law would favour Love." Love herself has expressed concern and hopes "that The Smashing Pumpkins frontman will one day reconcile." In light of Paterno's statement, "Pacific Coast Highway" was released as a single, indicating that Corgan's issue may have been resolved.

== Promotion ==
The song premiered live on July 9, 2007, at Love's surprise birthday show at Bush Hall in London. It was also performed during all shows on Love's short-lived 2007 tour, including shows in Paris and New York. The reworked version of the song was premiered on Hole's debut television appearance after their reunion, on Friday Night with Jonathan Ross on February 12, 2010 and also performed during Hole's three-date European reunion tour in London, Amsterdam and Milan. The band also performed "Samantha" at the NME Awards on February 24, 2010, alongside Nobody's Daughter's lead single, "Skinny Little Bitch" prior to the album's release.

== Critical reception ==
"Samantha" received mixed reception both upon its digital premiere on Stereogum and its inclusion on Nobody's Daughter. Amanda Petrusich of Pitchfork Media described the song, as well as others on the album, by stating that "the guitars are so dated, raunchy, and overstated that every track starts to feel like cartoon-rock-- more a Sunset Strip-rehash than grunge nostalgia" whereas Allan Raible of ABC's On the Record referred to it as "a classic Hole track, until it devolves into a repetition of the lines, “People like you f___ people like me, in order to avoid agony. / People like you f___ people like me in order to avoid suffering.” Despite the polished production, this indicates that Love is still willing to get a little rough around the edges."

== Reported single release ==
Since its initial mention in February 2007, "Samantha" was expected to be the lead single from Nobody's Daughter, however instead the Hole song "Skinny Little Bitch" was released in March 2010 as the album's lead single. Following the release of "Skinny Little Bitch", the song was then expected to be the second single from the album, however, the similarly penned "Pacific Coast Highway" was announced for release in April 2010 and "Letter to God", the album's final single, was released less than a month later. Artwork for the unreleased single of "Samantha" has been circulated online.

== Music video ==
In 2009, while the song was still intended for release under Courtney Love, Love revealed that David LaChapelle would direct the promotional music videos for singles from her then-forthcoming album and mentioned "i miss videos so happy Lachapelle is doing mine!" in a status update on social networking site Twitter. However, there is no confirmation, as of 2011, that LaChapelle has directed any promotional videos for Hole. A censored live version of the song, performed during Hole's reunion show at London's O2 Shepherd's Bush Empire on February 17, 2010, was released on HoleVEVO, Hole's channel as part of VEVO, by Island Def Jam on YouTube on May 4, 2010.

On May 30, 2011, Love announced on Twitter that a music video for "Samantha" was being recorded. Alongside the announcement, Love also posted a number of pictures from the video shoot on her fashion blog, What Courtney Wore Today.

An unfinished version of the video was leaked on Vimeo on August 27, 2011, but its privacy settings were updated within less than an hour, adding password-protection. The video re-emerged on the website courtney-love.org on September 23, 2011, with Love's blessing, though she has stated it is still unfinished.
