= The Return of Courtney Love =

- Written by: Will Yapp
- Directed by: Will Yapp
- Starring: Courtney Love; Linda Perry; Billy Corgan; Carrie Fisher
- Narrated by: Will Yapp
- Music by: Courtney Love
- Country of origin: United Kingdom
- Original language: English

Production
- Producers: Will Yapp, Juliet Rice
- Cinematography: Simon Fanthorpe
- Editor: Liz Rowe
- Running time: 46 minutes

Original release
- Network: More4
- Release: 27 September 2006

The Return of Courtney Love is a 2006 documentary film by Will Yapp documenting the progression of musician Courtney Love's second solo studio album, How Dirty Girls Get Clean, as well as her recovery from drug addiction. The documentary was first broadcast on More4 in the United Kingdom and Ireland on 27 September 2006.

== Overview ==
The documentary begins with director Will Yapp arriving at Courtney Love's rented home in Beverly Hills, California in March 2006 to find her chanting with friends in her living room — a routine, as Love practices Nichiren Buddhism. Love goes on to explain her religious and spiritual experiences.

The next focus of the documentary is Love's ill-fated 2004 solo debut, America's Sweetheart. Co-writer and partial producer, Linda Perry — also a friend of Love's — explains the circumstances surrounding the album's recording, citing Love's drug abuse as the reason for the album's ruin. As well as this, Perry and Love's friend Billy Corgan of The Smashing Pumpkins state that the reason for the album's critical and commercial failure was Love's public image, which at the time was plagued by constant court appearances and an infamous appearance on Pamela Anderson's Comedy Roast.

After Love's recent background is explained, the documentary focuses on the recording of her then-upcoming solo second album, How Dirty Girls Get Clean. As Love and her solo band perform a rehearsal version of the title track, Love explains the album's songs, calling them "all acerbic [...] none of them are tender love songs or very nice. They're all songs about disaster." Love also explains her motivation for the album. Later in the documentary, the focus again switches back to the recording of How Dirty Girls Get Clean with in-studio footage, as well as documenting the song-writing and production process with Linda Perry and Billy Corgan. After three weeks of recording, a fully produced version of "Sunset Marquis" is previewed.

The next segment of the documentary focuses on Love's late husband, Nirvana frontman Kurt Cobain, their relationship, and his death. As well as showing never-before-seen private home footage, Love shows the coat that Cobain killed himself in, becoming emotional and saying that "it freaks [her] out." Further explaining their relationship, a clip of Love performing "Pacific Coast Highway" — a song rumoured to be about Cobain — is shown. Further in the documentary, legal issues concerning Love's rights to Nirvana's back catalogue are highlighted, as well as Love's financial state.

Love's other non-musical projects are also showcased at one point in the documentary, specifically her book Dirty Blonde: The Diaries of Courtney Love. At this point, Love also explains her childhood and upbringing, referring to it as "Dickensian." Incidentally, Love's relationship with her daughter, Frances Bean Cobain is also explored. Love then visits her personal mentor, Carrie Fisher, and discuss methods for Love to avoid attention in British tabloids and Love's romantic history.

As the documentary ends, Love talks about her future ambitions and the release of the album.

== Previewed music ==
The Return of Courtney Love's highlight is the music previewed throughout the documentary. Rehearsal clips, demo previews and in-studio recording footage showcase the progression of songs later released and provide a unique insight into Love's song-writing process.

Music featured in the documentary includes:

- An acoustic rehearsal version of "How Dirty Girls Get Clean"
- An in-studio recording, a rehearsal version, and a rough studio mix of "Pacific Coast Highway"
- Two rehearsal versions of "Stand Up, Motherfucker"
- A demo preview of an unknown song
- An in-studio recording of "The Depths of My Despair"
- A rough studio mix of "Happy Ending Story"
- An acoustic rehearsal, an in-studio recording, and a rough studio mix of "Sunset Marquis"
- An acoustic rehearsal of an unknown song
- An in-studio recording of "For Once in Your Life"
- A studio recording of "Sad But True" is featured in the United States version.

Four of the featured songs in the documentary appeared on Hole's fourth studio album, Nobody's Daughter, in 2010. Nobody's Daughter — which was the final product of Love's unreleased How Dirty Girls Get Clean — was originally due to be the reworked version of How Dirty Girls Get Clean, however, was rerecorded as a Hole album in 2009.

== Release ==
The Return of Courtney Love originally aired in the United Kingdom and Ireland on 27 September 2006. It premiered in the United States on VH1 on 16 December 2006.

== Reception ==
Though well-received with Love's fans, Tim Teeman of The Times criticised the documentary's content and director, noting that it "wasn't painful viewing for the reasons its subject intended [...] but for the cowed awe of Will Yapp, the film's writer, director and producer. It's one thing to ingratiate oneself with a subject to elicit their secrets, but this was something else. Yapp seemed to want to be Love's friend, not her inquisitor."
