= Letter to God (song) =

2010 single by Hole

Single by Hole

from the album Nobody's Daughter
- Released: April 20, 2010
- Recorded: March 2006 at Kung Fu Gardens Recording Studio in Hollywood, California and August 2009 with overdubs at Electric Lady Studios, New York, New York
- Genre: Alternative rock, power pop
- Length: 4:04
- Label: CherryForever; Mercury/Island Def Jam (Universal Music Group)
- Songwriter: Linda Perry
- Producer: Linda Perry

Hole singles chronology
"Pacific Coast Highway" (2010)	"Letter to God" (2010)

"Letter to God" is a song by alternative rock band Hole, written solely by music producer Linda Perry. The song was released as the band's sixteenth single, and third and final single from their fourth studio album Nobody's Daughter, on April 20, 2010, as a digital download. The song was featured in the short animated film, Dark Night Of The Soul, directed by Michael Mouris. It is the last single released by the band.

== Origin and recording ==
The song was written by producer Linda Perry in 2002-03, alongside the similarly-penned "Beautiful" which Hole frontwoman Courtney Love originally wanted to record, and was set aside by Perry. When she assigned as the producer for Love's second solo album How Dirty Girls Get Clean in 2005, Perry reworked — in her own words "Courtnified" — the song with Love during the original rehearsal sessions for the album. In its original recorded form; recorded at Perry's personal studio, Kung Fu Gardens Recording Studio in Hollywood, California in March 2006; the song featured Love on vocals, Perry on electric guitar, Peter Thorn on acoustic guitar, Paul Ill on bass, Kellii Scott on drums and percussion and Damon Fox on piano. In 2009, as a Hole song, the original version recorded three years prior was expanded on during the recording sessions for Nobody's Daughter, the reworked version of How Dirty Girls Get Clean. During the final recording sessions at New York's Electric Lady Studios, additional guitar and bass overdubs were added by lead guitarist Micko Larkin and bassist Shawn Dailey, respectively.

== Composition ==
"Letter to God" was written solely by Perry in 2002–03 as a ballad. The song was composed in tuning half a step down (E♭-A♭-D♭-G♭-B♭-E♭) and in its original form, which was twelve seconds longer than the final version, had heavy emphasis on piano, with the opening chords (Am-G-Dm-Am) being strummed on guitar in the background. The opening of the song also used the same chords as the verse, including the revert to the minor chord, and for the chorus, the structure alternated to different, mostly major chords (C-Bm-F-C), and also the bass began being played. The bridge, which emphasised the drums, featured a further change (Bb-F-C) and ended with an outro based on the opening. In the Hole version of the song, the opening omitted the piano and solely used a guitar-led introduction with piano only being included during the choruses and bridge.

Lyrically, the song is written in the form of a letter, addressed to God ("Dear God, I'm writing this letter to you"), and narrates the story of a woman who is contemplating the meaning of life. Several themes are also featured in the lyrics, such as body image, suicide and the pressures of fame. Though not written by Love, these themes are also featured in other Hole songs which were written by Love, especially on songs included on the band's first two studio albums, Pretty on the Inside (1991) and Live Through This (1994).

== Release ==
The song was announced for release in early April 2010 by Amazon, where it was listed as an "MP3 Exclusive." It was released as a digital download through Amazon on April 20, 2010. The painting featured on the single's artwork is from The Execution of Lady Jane Grey (in French, Le Supplice de Jeanne Grey) by French painter, Paul Delaroche. It depicts the nominal English queen, Lady Jane Grey, - who was just sixteen at the time - being executed. The same painting was featured in the interior artwork to Nobody's Daughter, which featured "Letter to God" as its eight track when released on April 27, 2010, and was chosen by Love as she felt "we always get rid of the good dames."

== Critical reception ==
Critical reception to the song was mixed. NME said upon the announcement of Hole's reunion that "Letter to God" was "a confessional power ballad from Perry's box of hits" with Love implying that the editor was a fan of song, joking that "you guys are the NME, you're not supposed to like this song. I'd be worried if you did!" Entertainment Weekly described the song as "nakedly vulnerable" and "she [Love] mines something deeper — a girl who may still riot, but finally walks toward grown womanhood, too." Pitchfork Media negatively compared to Hole's previous single "Pacific Coast Highway" as it was "filtered through years of overwrites and third-party input" and "suffers from a silly conceit, but offers moments of genuine humility."

== Music video ==
While the song was still intended for release under Courtney Love in 2009, Love stated that David LaChapelle would direct the promotional music videos for singles from her then-forthcoming album and mentioned "I miss videos so happy LaChapelle is doing mine!" in a status update on social networking site Twitter. However, there is no confirmation, as of 2011, that LaChapelle has, or will be, directing Hole's promotional videos.

A live version of the song, performed during Hole's reunion show at London's O2 Shepherd's Bush Empire on February 17, 2010, was released on HoleVEVO, Hole's channel as part of VEVO, by Island Def Jam on YouTube on May 4, 2010.

== Live performances ==
Courtney Love debuted "Letter to God" live during a guest performance with Linda Perry at the House of Blues in Los Angeles, California on June 1, 2007. The song was also performed at the remainder of Love's 2007 live performances, which featured dates in Europe and the United States, and featured Micko Larkin on lead guitar, Patricia "Pato" Vidal on bass, future Hole member Stu Fisher on drums and percussion Bethia Beadman on piano and keyboards, and rhythm guitarist Liam Wade. As a Hole song, it was performed various times throughout Hole's world tour in 2010 and featured bassist Shawn Dailey.

== Track listing ==
- Digital single
1. Letter to God - 4:04

== Release history ==
Region	Date	Format
Worldwide	April 20, 2010	Digital download

== Personnel ==
Musicians

- Courtney Love - vocals
- Linda Perry - electric guitar, acoustic guitar
- Peter Thorn - electric guitar, acoustic guitar
- Micko Larkin - additional guitars
- Paul Ill - bass
- Shawn Dailey - additional bass
- Kellii Scott - drums
- Jack Irons - additional drums
- Damon Fox - piano

Technical personnel

- Linda Perry - producer, engineer
- Noah Goldstein - producer, engineer (Note: Goldstein was the producer, engineer and recorder at for the later sessions at Electric Lady Studios, where Larkin and Dailey recorded overdubs, not the original sessions in 2006.)
- Andrew Chavez - additional engineer
- Kris Kaufman - assistant engineer
- D. Sardy - mixing
- Andy Brohard - mix engineer
