= Skinny Little Bitch =

Single by Hole

Single by Hole

from the album Nobody's Daughter
- B-side: "Codine"
- Released: March 12, 2010
- Recorded: June 2009
- Studio: Henson, Hollywood
- Genre: Alternative rock, punk rock, hard rock
- Length: 3:09
- Label: Mercury
- Songwriter(s): Courtney Love, Micko Larkin
- Producer(s): Michael Beinhorn, Micko Larkin

Hole singles chronology
"Be a Man" (2000)	"Skinny Little Bitch" (2010)	"Pacific Coast Highway" (2010)

"Skinny Little Bitch" is a song by the American alternative rock band Hole. It is the second track and lead single from the band's fourth studio album, Nobody's Daughter, and was released on March 12, 2010 on Mercury Records. Written by vocalist Courtney Love and lead guitarist Micko Larkin, "Skinny Little Bitch" was Hole's first single in a decade and first release not to feature founding member Eric Erlandson.

The song premiered on the New York radio station WRXP on March 3, 2010 and was released to American radio on March 9. During the first week of its radio release, the song became the most added on alternative radio and the second most added on active rock in the United States. A digital download of the single was officially made available on March 12 and a limited edition colored 10" was released as part of Record Store Day 2010 on April 17.

Two official music videos for "Skinny Little Bitch" have been released on Hole's official YouTube channel—a multi-camera version of the band's performance at SXSW in March 2010 and a shortened video of Love performing the song while getting a tattoo. Other plans for a music video, including an animation by Michael Mouris and a video featuring model Sasha Pivovarova, were considered but never received a greenlight from Mercury Records.

"Skinny Little Bitch" was added to the US Active Rock Charts at #32 making it the first song with lead vocals from a female to ever make the chart.

== Release and reception ==
The track was described by NME as,

"a balls-out, low-down dirty rock song, and as fine a signature tune for the new Hole as you could imagine. Tapping the same lyrical vein as 'Samantha', it's The Stooges fronted by a Joan Jett re-imagined as the Bride Of Frankenstein. And it’s the sound of Courtney having fun."

== Promotion ==
"Skinny Little Bitch" was debuted live during Hole's reunion show at London's O2 Shepherd's Bush Empire on 17 February 2010. It was also played during two other European dates at Milan's Magazzini Generali, and Amsterdam's Paradiso on 19 February and 21 February 2010 respectively. On February 24, it was played alongside "Samantha" at the NME Awards at London's O2 Academy Brixton. The song was heard on an episode of Warehouse 13.

== Music video ==
Talking about the music video, Love stated, "there will be a stunning video for SLB as long as the only model that you will all fall in love w that the band needs does it!." She later revealed the model to be Sasha Pivovarova, chosen because "shes the only look that can convey what the SLB goes through a lot of self torture."

However, Love has since stated that Mert and Marcus will direct the music video provided that Mercury greenlights the project, while also stating again that Sasha Pivovarova will take on the role of the "Skinny Little Bitch."

On 7 April 2010, Hole's official YouTube channel released a multicamera mix of Hole's performance of "Skinny Little Bitch" at the SXSW music festival. The performance is overdubbed with the single version of the song. Less than three weeks later, on 27 April, Hole released "the least expensive Courtney Love video ever", directed by Casey Neistat. It features Love singing "Skinny Little Bitch" while getting a tattoo and is less than two minutes in length.

== Track listing and formats ==
Digital download

1. "Skinny Little Bitch" – 3:09

US 10" single (B0014258-11)

1. "Skinny Little Bitch" – 3:09
2. "Codine" – 3:57

== Personnel ==
All personnel credits adapted from Nobody's Daughter's liner notes.

Hole

- Courtney Love – vocals, composition, writing
- Micko Larkin – guitar, composition
- Shawn Dailey – bass
- Stu Fisher – drums

Guest musician

- Jack Irons – drums

Technical personnel

- Michael Beinhorn – producer
- Owen Lewis – assistant producer
- Karl Egsieker – engineer
- Nico Essig – additional engineer
- Tom Syrowski – additional engineer
- John O'Mahoney – mixing

== Chart positions ==
Chart (2010)	Peak position
Australia (ARIA)	180
US Billboard Alternative Songs	19
US Billboard Rock Songs	29

== Release history ==
Region	Date	Format
Ireland	12 March 2010	Digital download
Belgium	15 March 2010	Digital download
Czech Republic	15 March 2010	Digital download
Denmark	15 March 2010	Digital download
Finland	15 March 2010	Digital download
Italy	15 March 2010	Digital download
Canada	16 March 2010	Digital download
Greece	16 March 2010	Digital download
Spain	16 March 2010	Digital download
Sweden	16 March 2010	Digital download
United States	16 March 2010	Digital download
Australia	19 March 2010	Digital download
Switzerland	19 March 2010	Digital download
New Zealand	22 March 2010	Digital download
Austria	23 March 2010	Digital download
Germany	23 March 2010	Digital download
Japan	24 March 2010	Digital download
United States	13 April 2010	Vinyl
Portugal	15 April 2010	Digital download
France	19 April 2010	Digital download
United Kingdom	26 April 2010	Digital download
