= Letters to Kurt =

2012 book by Eric Erlandson

- Author: Eric Erlandson
- Language: English
- Genre: Poetry, essays
- Publisher: Akashic Books
- Publication date: April 10, 2012
- Publication place: United States
- Pages: 120
- ISBN: 978-1-61775-083-0

Letters to Kurt is a collection of poetry and essays by musician Eric Erlandson, published in April 2012 by Akashic Books. The book largely reads as a meditation on suicide idols, and as an elegy to Nirvana frontman Kurt Cobain, whom Erlandson was acquainted with through Courtney Love; Erlandson served as a founding member and lead guitarist of Love's band, Hole, for eleven years.

== Release ==
Letters to Kurt was announced for release in December 2011 on Erlandson's Facebook profile. The book was released on April 10, 2012, and published by Akashic Books. A limited edition pre-order package includes an advanced hardback copy of the book, a signed copy of Cock Soup—a collection of 52 photographs that serves as a visual accompaniment to the book—, a signed individual snapshot, and a CD including the soundtrack to the book.

=== Reception ===
Kirkus Reviews wrote that, "a friend and fellow musician not only continues to mourn [Cobain's] suicide, but also rages against the culture that he holds responsible. These 52 'letters' combine the subject matter of the Byrds' "So You Want to Be a Rock 'n' Roll Star" with the fury of Allen Ginsberg's Howl" and described it as "a catharsis for the writer and perhaps for the reader as well." Fellow musician, Thurston Moore of Sonic Youth described how "Eric expresses how enchanting Kurt was, how the whole scene was, with his thoughtful, radical adult/prose love" and author Everett True called the Letters to Kurt "beautiful, brutal, brief. Happy-sad eloquence. Boy Scouts playing with the complimentary cologne in the heart of the ghost town. Listen to the man. He knows."
