= RRIICCEE =

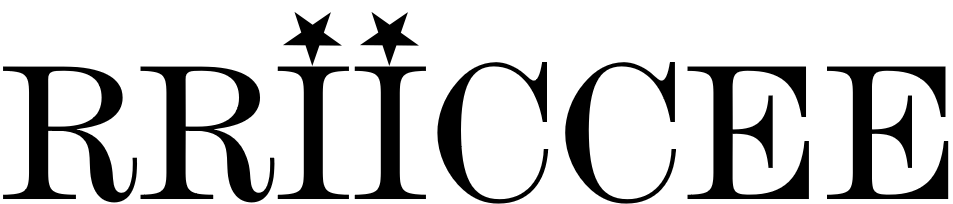

Background information
- Origin: Los Angeles, California, U.S.
- Genres: Experimental rock
- Years active: 2006–2010
- Past members: Vincent Gallo; Corey Lee Granet; Eric Erlandson; Rebecca Casabian; Woody Jackson; Simon Haas; Nikolas Haas; Nico Turner
- Website: www.rriiccee.com

RRIICCEE was an American experimental rock band formed by filmmaker Vincent Gallo and musician Eric Erlandson.

== History ==
In 2006, long time acquaintances Vincent Gallo and Eric Erlandson formed RRIICCEE out of conversations they had following a run-in at a health food store in Los Angeles. Gallo had previously been a fan of Erlandson's work, having watched his grunge rock band Hole play during the early 1990s. They later enlisted bassist Rebecca Casabian and drummer Nikolas Haas.

Erlandson parted with the band in 2007, upon the end of their sold out North American tour, after which Simon Haas (Nikolas' brother) joined as keyboardist. The band would sell merchandise; exclusive hand-printed and hand-sewn pieces that ranged from pink fur boots to camisoles and turtlenecks.

In 2010, RRIICCEE toured in the United States and Japan before becoming inactive.

== Artistry ==
RRIICCEE was characterized by their spontaneity on stage. The band never formally released their own recordings, instead relying on improvisation to create new and unique music during each one of their performances.
