= Scott Lipps =

American drummer and talent manager

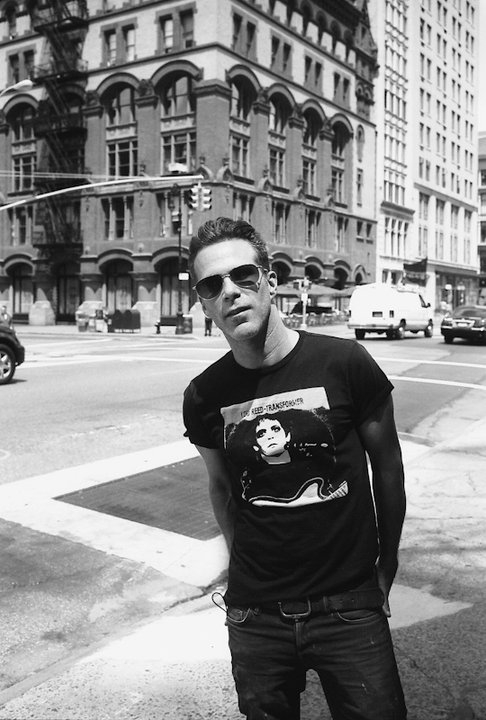
- Occupation: Talent agent, podcaster, drummer

Scott Lipps is an American musician and the talent manager.

Born August 1, to Barbara and Jerry Lipps, Scott was born and raised in Long Island, New York, where he first enrolled at the Percussion Institute of Technology and later attended California State University at Northridge. Lipps learned management while touring with the band and supplemented his income by working for Lindy Goetz, manager for the Red Hot Chili Peppers. At the suggestion of his mother, Lipps started working for a relative that owned NEXT Model Management. He then moved to New York City where he founded One Management in 2001, which he managed until 2017.

In fall 2011, he starred in the E! Entertainment network show Scooted.

Between 2011 and 2013, Lipps played drums for Hole and Courtney Love's solo band.

In 2018, he launched his Dash Radio/Podcast show titled Lipps Service.
