= Pacific Coast Highway (song) =

2010 single by Hole

Single by Hole

from the album Nobody's Daughter
- Released: April 6, 2010
- Recorded: August 2009 at Electric Lady Studios, New York City
- Genre: Alternative rock, power pop
- Length: 5:13
- Label: CherryForever; Mercury/Island Def Jam (Universal Music Group)
- Songwriters: Courtney Love, Billy Corgan
- Producers: Michael Beinhorn, Micko Larkin

Hole singles chronology
"Skinny Little Bitch" (2010)	"Pacific Coast Highway" (2010)	"Letter to God" (2010)

"Pacific Coast Highway" is the fifteenth single by the alternative rock group Hole. It is the second single from the band's fourth studio album Nobody's Daughter. It was released as a digital download on April 6, 2010, and was added to modern rock radio in the United States on May 5, 2010.

== Background and history ==
"Pacific Coast Highway" was written by Courtney Love in a Los Angeles hotel on December 24, 2005. The song was later contributed to by the producer Linda Perry and Billy Corgan. In 2009, when being recorded as a Hole song, various new additions were made to the song, most notably a solo and a final bridge, both of which were written by the guitarist, Micko Larkin.

== Critical reception ==
The track was described by NME as,

One of the earliest songs on the session, toughened up from the Perry era, this confessional song is nonetheless one of the record’s more plaintive moments, in the vein of 'Malibu'. Lyrically, it finally addresses the scars she still bears over her husband's death in the most brutal fashion: "I knew a boy who came from the sea/he was the only boy who ever knew the truth about me... I knew a boy who left me so ravaged/do you even know the extent of the damage? ... I'm overwhelmed and undersexed?/Baby what did you expect?/I'm overwrought and so disgraced/I'm too ashamed to show my face/And they're coming to take me away now/what I want I will never have/I'm on the Pacific Coast Highway/With your gun in my hand."

In its week of release it was the most added song to modern rock radio in the United States. An AOL exclusive acoustic performance video of the track was released as a part of the AOL Sessions, and "Pacific Coast Highway" peaked at #6 on the Billboard' Top AOL Music Video chart in May 2010.

== Track listing ==
- Digital single
1. Pacific Coast Highway - 5:13

== Music video ==
On May 24, 2010, Courtney Love wrote on Twitter that a promotional music video for "Pacific Coast Highway" was in the works.

== Musicians and personnel ==
- Courtney Love - vocals
- Micko Larkin - guitars, additional producer
- Shawn Dailey - bass guitar
- Stu Fisher - drums
- Jack Irons - additional drums
- Jenni Muldaur - backing vocals
- Michael Beinhorn - producer
- Owen Lewis - assistant producer
- Noah Goldstein - engineer
- Ryan Gilligan - additional engineer
- Ian Shea - additional engineer
- Pete Bischof - additional engineer
- D. Sardy - mixing

== Release history ==
Region	Date	Format
United States	April 6, 2010	Digital download
