= Darlia (band) =

British rock band

- Origin: Blackpool, England
- Genre: Alternative rock
- Years active: 2013–2019
- Label: B-Unique Records
- Members: Nathan Day; Dave Williams; Micko Larkin; Greg "Greggles" Bishop
- Past members: Jack Bentham
- Website: https://www.darlia.co.uk/

Darlia were an English rock band from Blackpool. Formed in 2013, the band released various EPs and a mini-album, Petals.

== History ==
The band was formed in 2013 in Blackpool by former schoolmates Nathan Day and Jack Bentham, along with Dave Williams. They signed with B-Unique recordings and released three EPs between 2013 and 2015. Petals, an eight track mini-album, was released in 2015, charting at number 79 in the UK. The band have toured supporting Gerard Way, Nothing But Thieves and The Wombats, played Glastonbury Festival and Reading Festival, as well as being part of the NME Awards Tour 2015. Their first full LP was expected to be released in 2016.

In 2017, frontman Nathan Day released a satirical NME article that suggested the band had been taking a break.

In 2019, Day launched a solo career stating that ".“Being in a band taught me what I wanted to do. It made me realize I had to do this for myself, because I just wanted to get as much music out as possible".

== Band members ==
- Nathan Day – vocals, guitar (2013–2019)
- Dave "Davey" Williams – bass guitar, backing vocals (2013–2019)
- Micko Larkin – guitar, backing vocals (2017–2019)
- Greg "Greggles" Bishop – drums, backing vocals (2017–2019)

== Former members ==
- Jack Bentham – drums, backing vocals (2013–2017)

== Discography ==
=== Albums ===
Year	Album details	Peak chart positions
Year	Album details	UK
2015	Petals: Released: 23 February 2015; Label: B-Unique Recordings	79

=== Extended plays/Singles EP ===
Year	Title of the EP	Tracks
2013	Darlia	1. Pandemonium; 2. Bite The Apple; 3. Queen Of Hearts
2013	Knock Knock	1. Queen of Hearts; 2. Napalm; 3. Choke On Bones
2014	Candyman	1. Candyman; 2. Animal Kingdom; 3. Blood Money
2014	Dear Diary	1. Dear Diary; 2. Pandemonium
2015	Daytrotter Session	1. Welcome to Daytrotter [intro]; 2. Dear Diary (live); 3. I've Never Been To Ohio (live); 4. Queen Of Hearts (live); 5. Pandemonium (live)

=== Singles ===
- Queen Of Hearts (2013)
- Stars Are Aligned (2014)
- Candyman (2014)
- Dear Diary (2014)
- I've Never Been To Ohio (2015)

Queen of hearts (2015)

- Ballad of Black & White (2017)
- Beat Me Up (2017)
- Pandemonium (2019)

== Side projects ==
=== Nathan Day ===
==== EPs ====
- We Come in Pieces (2021)
- Fall Forever (2022)

==== Other Releases ====
- Vertigo (2019) [non-album single]
- Catch Some Zee's (2019) [non-album single]
