= Stu Fisher =

English musician

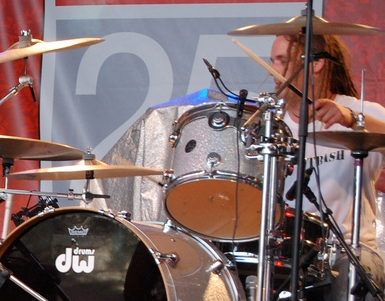

Background information
- Origin: London, United Kingdom
- Genres: Alternative rock, indie rock, psychedelic rock, instrumental rock
- Years active: 2002—present
- Label: Mercury/Island Def Jam (Universal Music Group)

Stuart Fisher is an English musician, notable for being drummer of alternative rock band Hole between 2009 and 2011. Prior to becoming a member of Hole, Fisher was also the drummer of English psychedelic rock band Ozric Tentacles and also Fingermonster. He was raised on the Isle of Wight, later relocating to Somerset while in Ozric Tentacles, London and later Los Angeles while playing with Courtney Love and is now based in the Isle of Wight. Love revealed he had once worked for Hello! magazine in 1999.

== Ozric Tentacles (2002–2003) ==
Fisher was the drummer for Ozric Tentacles from 2002 until 2003 and is featured on the 2010 reissue of the band's third studio album, Strangeitude on the live track "Sploosh!", recorded for XFM in London, United Kingdom in 2003.

== The Courtney Love Band and Hole (2007–2011) ==
Fisher was recruited, alongside lead guitarist Micko Larkin, at London auditions held by Courtney Love in 2007. After a period of rehearsal in Los Angeles, Fisher and Larkin played as part of Love's new band alongside bassist Patricia "Pato" Vidal, Bethia Beadman on piano and keyboards and rhythm guitarist Liam Wade. In July 2007, the band began a short four-date tour of the United States and Europe, performing at Givenchy Salon in Paris, France on 4 July; Bush Hall in London, United Kingdom on 9 July; the Hiro Ballroom in New York on 12 July and the Roxy Theatre in West Hollywood, California on 17 July.

During January 2009, recording sessions for Love's long-in-preparation studio album, Nobody's Daughter, began in Burbank, California with Fisher playing drums and percussion. At a second recording session, in Los Angeles' Henson Recording Studios, Love also performed drums and it was during this session, on 17 June 2009, that Love announced that the album would be released under the name of Hole. In the following months, former lead guitarist Eric Erlandson and former bassist Melissa Auf der Maur disputed Love's right to use the name of her former band, due to a contract Love and Erlandson signed in 2002 after the band's initial split. Despite ongoing disputes, Hole's reunion proceeded with Fisher on drums. The final recording sessions for the album were held at Electric Lady Studios in New York and although Fisher was the main drummer on all of the album's songs (except "Letter to God"), Jack Irons was also an additional drummer. On 23 April 2010, Nobody's Daughter was released as Hole's fourth studio album and the band also embarked on a worldwide tour. Fisher's first official appearance as Hole's drummer was on Friday Night with Jonathan Ross on 12 February 2010, performing "Samantha."

== Skinny Mammoth Studios ==
Since 2011, Fisher and long-time collaborator Dave Waight have been running their own recording studio on the Isle of Wight. Called Skinny Mammoth, it is situated in Newport, I.O.W.
