= Be a Man (song) =

Single by Hole

from the album Any Given Sunday: Music from the Motion Picture
- B-side: "Whatever It Takes (by P.O.D.)"
- Released: January 31, 2000
- Recorded: 1997
- Genre: Alternative Rock
- Label: Geffen
- Songwriters: Courtney Love, Eric Erlandson, Billy Corgan
- Producer: Michael Beinhorn

Hole singles chronology
"Awful" (1999)	"Be a Man" (2000)	"Skinny Little Bitch" (2010)

"Be a Man" is the thirteenth and last single by alternative rock band Hole before their breakup in 2002.

The song was co-written by Hole members Courtney Love and Eric Erlandson with contribution from frequent guest Billy Corgan of The Smashing Pumpkins. Released in 2000 as a double A-side (the other track being from P.O.D.) this track also featured on the soundtrack to the film Any Given Sunday (1999). It was the last single by the band for ten years, until "Skinny Little Bitch" in 2010.

== Background ==
"Be a Man" was initially recorded during sessions for the band's third studio album Celebrity Skin (1998). The band, however, left the song off the album as they felt it was not cohesive with the rest of the record. On December 2, 1999, the song was uploaded online as a free digital download.

== Critical reception ==
Chuck Taylor of Billboard referred to the song as "a slice of femcore" and praised Love's vocal performance.

== Music video ==
The video (directed by Joseph Kahn) for Be a Man features a blue-haired Courtney Love with a dress in the same color in a football field, interacting with, seducing and French-kissing the game players from the film as a rain starts. It is the first Hole video not to feature Eric Erlandson (the only member remaining in the band besides Love at that point), plus it also featured her naked in the video.

== Track listings and formats ==
- CD single
1. "Be a Man" (radio edit) – 3:18
2. "Be a Man" (album version) – 3:18
3. "Whatever It Takes" (performed by P.O.D.) – 4:02

== Credits and personnel ==
Credits and personnel are adapted from the Any Given Sunday album liner notes.

- Courtney Love – writer, performer, producer
- Eric Erlandson – writer, performer, producer
- Billy Corgan – writer
- Melissa Auf der Maur – performer, producer
- Patty Schemel – performer, producer
- Michael Beinhorn – producer
- Jack Joseph Puig – mixing
- Bob Ludwig – mastering

== Charts ==
Chart (2000)	Peak position
Australia (ARIA)	102
