= Micko Larkin =

English musician (born 1986)

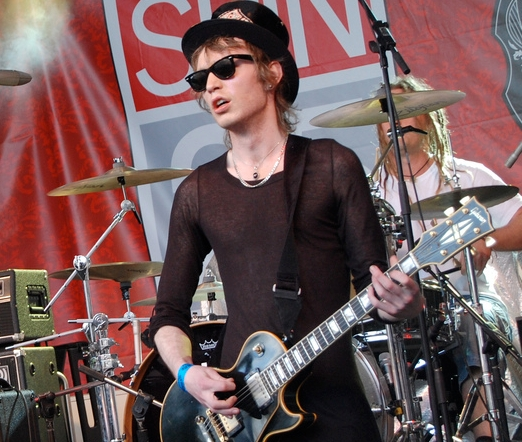
- Larkin performing with Hole in 2010.

Background information
- Born: 13 October 1986 (age 39); Hammersmith, London, England
- Genres: Alternative rock, indie rock
- Years active: 2005–present
- Labels: Warner, Mercury/Island Def Jam (Universal Music Group)

Michael "Micko" Joseph Larkin (born 13 October 1986) is an English musician, most notable as the lead guitarist of the indie rock band Larrikin Love and reformed Hole.

== Biography ==
=== 1986–2006: Early life and career ===
Larkin was born in Hammersmith to Irish parents. In 2005, he formed the short-lived Larrikin Love with vocalist Edward Larrikin, bassist Alfie Ambrose and drummer, Coz Kerrigan. The band was described in NME magazine as part of the fictional "Thamesbeat scene", and released one album during their career, The Freedom Spark and six singles. Larrikin Love disbanded on 4 May 2007, after the group's members began to embark on other musical projects.

=== 2007—present: As guitarist for Courtney Love and Hole reunion ===
After Larrikin Love's split, Larkin moved to Los Angeles to work with former Hole frontwoman, Courtney Love. Mairead Nash, manager of indie pop groups, Florence + the Machine, and Queens of Noize recommended Larkin to Love in June 2007, and after his audition became lead guitarist of Love's solo group, unofficially titled The Courtney Love Band. Larkin joined Love's band alongside bassist Patricia "Pato" Vidal, drummer Stu Fisher, pianist Bethia Beadman, and rhythm guitarist Liam Wade. Love and the band embarked on a short tour of the United Kingdom in 2007, including one additional date in Paris, France, in July 2007.

On 17 June 2009, Love and Larkin announced the reunion of Love's former band Hole via an NME webblog. Larkin replaced former guitarist and Hole co-founder Eric Erlandson on lead guitar. In the following months, Erlandson and former bassist, Melissa Auf der Maur claimed no reunion could take place due to a contract Love and Erlandson signed in 2002 after the band's initial split which stated that the name Hole could not be used by either without mutual involvement. Despite this, Hole's reunion proceeded. Hole's fourth studio album, Nobody's Daughter, featured Larkin on lead guitar, as co-producer and as main co-writer on four tracks, also adding additional parts to previously-written songs such as "Pacific Coast Highway" and "Samantha."

On 29 November 2012, Love stated on her Twitter account for her upcoming clothing line: "From now on [the band is called Courtney], Hole is dead", implying that she was abandoning the Hole moniker and returning to performing as a solo artist, with Larkin, bassist Shawn Dailey and drummer Scott Lipps as her backing band. She planned to release a new album, titled Died Blonde, in the winter of 2013.

Since 2017 he has played guitar with Liverpool-based rock band Darlia.
