= Hole (band) =

American alternative rock band

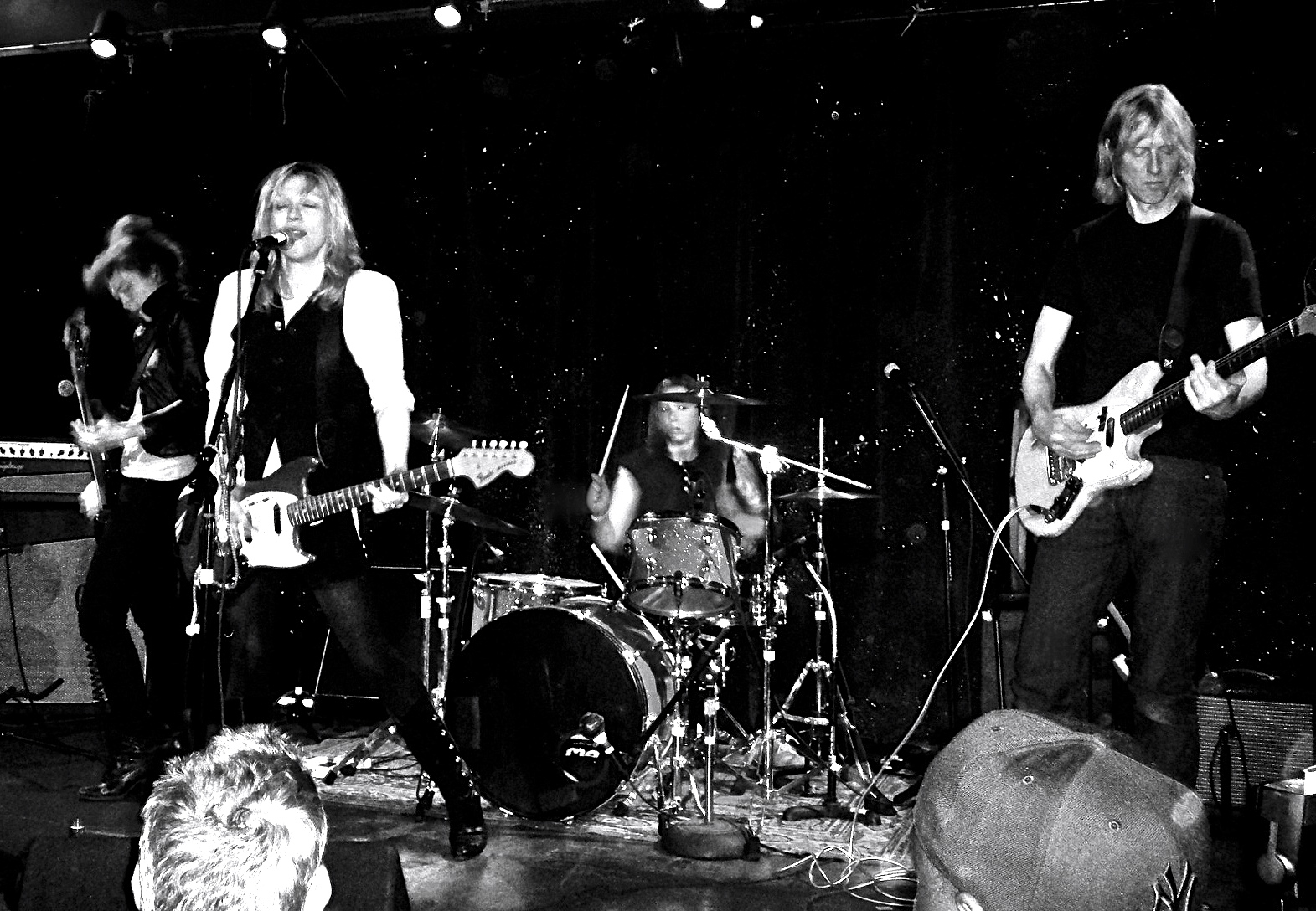
- Hole performing at Public Assembly, NYC, in April 2012

Background information
- Origin: Hollywood, Los Angeles, California, U.S.
- Genres: Alternative rock; grunge; punk rock; noise rock; power pop
- Works: Discography
- Years active: 1989–2002; 2009–2012
- Labels: Sympathy for the Record Industry; Sub Pop; Caroline; City Slang; DGC; Mercury
- Past members: Courtney Love; Eric Erlandson; Mike Geisbrecht; Lisa Roberts; Caroline Rue; Jill Emery; Patty Schemel; Leslie Hardy; Kristen Pfaff; Melissa Auf der Maur; Samantha Maloney; Micko Larkin; Shawn Dailey; Stu Fisher; Scott Lipps

Hole was an American alternative rock band formed in Los Angeles, California, in 1989. It was founded by singer/guitarist Courtney Love and guitarist Eric Erlandson. It had several different bassists and drummers, the most notable being drummer Patty Schemel and bassists Kristen Pfaff (d. 1994) and Melissa Auf der Maur. Hole released a total of four studio albums between two incarnations spanning the 1990s and early-2010s and became one of the most commercially successful rock bands in history fronted by a woman.

Influenced by Los Angeles' punk rock scene, the band's debut album, Pretty on the Inside (1991), was produced by Kim Gordon of Sonic Youth, and attracted critical interest from British and American alternative press. Their second album, Live Through This, released in 1994 by DGC Records, combined elements of punk, grunge, and pop rock music, and was widely acclaimed, reaching platinum status within a year of its release. Their third album, Celebrity Skin (1998), marked a notable departure from their earlier punk influences, boasting a more commercially viable sound; the album sold around 2 million copies worldwide, and earned them significant critical acclaim.

They disbanded in 2002, and the members individually pursued other projects. Eight years later in 2010, Hole was reformed by Love with new members, despite Erlandson's claim that the reformation breached a mutual contract he had with her. The reformed band released the album Nobody's Daughter (2010), which was conceived as Love's second solo album. In 2013, Love retired the Hole name, releasing new material and touring as a solo artist.

Hole received several accolades, including four Grammy Award nominations. They were also commercially successful, selling over three million records in the United States alone, and had a far-reaching influence on contemporary female artists. Music and feminist scholars have also recognized the band as the most high-profile musical group of the 1990s to discuss gender issues in their songs, due to Love's aggressive and violent lyrical content, which often addressed themes of body image, abuse, and sexual exploitation.

== Background ==
In Euripides' Medea, when she kills the bride and her own child, she says "There's a hole that pierces my soul." [And] my mother's this kind of new age psychologist, and I said "You know, I had this terrible childhood," and she said "Well, you can't have a hole running through you all the time, Courtney." You know, and then [there's] the genital reference, go ahead and make it if you will.

— Courtney Love on the origins of the name Hole, 1995.

Hole formed after Eric Erlandson responded to an advertisement placed by Courtney Love in The Recycler in the summer of 1989. The advertisement read: "I want to start a band. My influences are Big Black, Sonic Youth, and Fleetwood Mac." Erlandson recalled of their first meeting: "We met at this coffee shop, and I saw her and I thought 'Oh, God. Oh, no, What am I getting myself into?' She grabbed me and started talking, and she's like 'I know you're the right one', and I hadn't even opened my mouth yet." In retrospect, Love said that Erlandson "had a Thurston [Moore] quality about him" and was an "intensely weird, good guitarist". In his 2012 book Letters to Kurt, Erlandson revealed that he and Love had a sexual relationship during their first year together in the band, which Love also confirmed.

Love had been living a nomadic life prior, immersing herself in numerous music scenes and living in various cities along the West Coast. After unsuccessful attempts at forming bands in San Francisco (where she was briefly a member of Faith No More) and Portland, Love relocated to Los Angeles, where she found work as an actress in two Alex Cox films (Sid and Nancy and Straight to Hell). Erlandson, a Los Angeles native and a graduate of Loyola Marymount University, was working as an accountant for Capitol Records at the time he met Love.

Love originally wanted to name the band Sweet Baby Crystal Powered by God, but opted for the name Hole instead. During an interview on Later... with Jools Holland, she claimed the name for the band was partly inspired by a quote from Euripides' Medea that read: "There is a hole that pierces right through me." She also cited a conversation with her mother as the primary inspiration for the band's name, in which her mother told her that she couldn't live her life "with a hole running through her". Love also acknowledged the "obvious" genital reference in the band's name, alluding to the vagina.

== History ==
=== 1989–1991: Early work and indie success ===
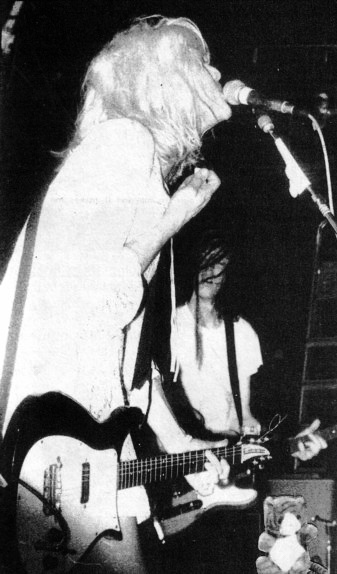
Love and Erlandson performing with Hole, c. 1989

In the months preceding the band's full formation, Love and Erlandson would write and record in the evenings at a rehearsal space in Hollywood, loaned to them by the Red Hot Chili Peppers; during the day, Love worked as a stripper to support the band and purchase amplifiers and their backline for live shows. Hole's first official rehearsal took place at Fortress Studios in Hollywood with Love, Erlandson and Lisa Roberts on bass. According to Erlandson, "these two girls show up dressed completely crazy, we set up and they said, 'okay, just start playing something.' I started playing and they started screaming at the top of their lungs for two or three hours. Crazy lyrics and screaming. I said to myself, 'most people would just run away from this really fast.' But I heard something in Courtney's voice and lyrics." Initially, the band had no percussion until Love met drummer Caroline Rue at a Gwar and L7 concert in Long Beach. The band subsequently recruited a third guitarist, Mike Geisbrecht.

Hole's first show took place at Raji's, a small bar in Hollywood, in October 1989. The group later opened for 45 Grave in Huntington Beach in November 1989. By early 1990, Geisbrecht and Roberts had both left the band, which led to the recruitment of bassist Jill Emery. According to Caroline Rue, Love fired Roberts after she threatened a Long Beach club owner—the wife of mobster Eddie Nash—with a screwdriver when the club refused to pay them for their performance.

Hole released their no wave-influenced debut single "Retard Girl" in April 1990, and followed it with "Dicknail" in 1991, released on Sympathy for the Record Industry and Sub Pop, respectively. According to disc jockey Rodney Bingenheimer, Love would often approach him at a Denny's on Sunset Blvd. where he went for coffee in the mornings, and convinced him to give "Retard Girl" airtime on his station KROQ-FM.

In 1991, the band signed onto Caroline Records to release their debut album, and Love sought Kim Gordon of Sonic Youth to produce the record. She sent a letter, a Hello Kitty barrette, and copies of the band's early singles to her, mentioning that the band greatly admired Gordon's work and appreciated "the production of the SST record" (either referring to Sonic Youth's album Sister or EVOL). Gordon, impressed by the band's singles, agreed to produce the album, with assistance from Gumball's Don Fleming. The album, titled Pretty on the Inside, was released in September 1991 to positive reception from underground critics, branded "loud, ugly and deliberately shocking", and earned a spot on Spin's "20 Best Albums of the Year" list. It was also voted album of the year by New York's Village Voice and peaked at number 59 on the UK albums chart. The album spawned one single, "Teenage Whore", which entered the UK Indie Chart at number one, as well as the band's debut music video for the song "Garbadge Man".

Musically and lyrically, Pretty on the Inside was abrasive and drew on elements of punk rock and sludge metal, characterized by overt noise and feedback, chaotic guitar riffs, contrasting tempos, graphic lyrics, and a variation of Love's vocals ranging from whispers to guttural screaming. In later years, Love referred to the album as "unlistenable", despite its critical accolades and eventual cult following. The band embarked on a European tour in the fall of 1991 supporting Mudhoney. They also toured intermittently in the United States between July and December 1991, playing primarily at hard rock and punk clubs, including CBGB and the Whisky a Go Go, where they opened for the Smashing Pumpkins. In a write-up by the Los Angeles Times on the band's final show of the tour, it was noted that Love smashed the headstock of her Rickenbacker guitar onstage.

In mid-1991, the band began to get the attention of the major labels. The first to court them was Maverick — a Warner subsidiary founded by Madonna and music executive Freddy DeMann. Love, however, was uninterested: "[They] would have me riding on elephants. They don't know what I am. For them, I'm a visual, period." She was also uneasy about sharing the spotlight on a label so heavily associated with one of the industry's most iconic female performers. In a 1992 interview with Vanity Fair, Love described Madonna's interest as "kind of like Dracula's interest in his latest victim".

=== 1992–1999: Mainstream success ===
==== 1992–1995: Live Through This ====
Love and Erlandson began writing new material for a second Hole album in 1992, in the midst of Love's pregnancy with Nirvana frontman Kurt Cobain. Love's desire to take the band in a more melodic and controlled rock format led bassist Emery to leave the band, and drummer Caroline Rue followed. In an advertisement to find a new bass player, Love wrote: "[I want] someone who can play ok, and stand in front of 30,000 people, take off her shirt and have 'fuck you' written on her tits. If you're not afraid of me and you're not afraid to fucking say it, send a letter. No more pussies, no more fake girls, I want a whore from hell." In April 1992, drummer Patty Schemel was recruited after an audition in Los Angeles, but the band spent the remainder of the year without a bassist; Love, Schemel, and Erlandson began to write material together in the interim.

Hole signed to Geffen's subsidiary DGC label with an eight-album contract in late 1992. In the spring of 1993, the band released their single "Beautiful Son", which was recorded in Seattle with producer Jack Endino as a fill-in bass player; Love also played bass on the single's b-side "20 Years In the Dakota", as well as on their contribution to the 1993 Germs tribute album A Small Circle of Friends. In the spring of 1993, Love and Erlandson recruited Janitor Joe bassist Kristen Pfaff, and the band toured the United Kingdom in the summer of that year (including the Phoenix Festival on July 16), mainly performing material from their upcoming major label debut, Live Through This, which they recorded at Triclops Studios in Marietta, Georgia, in October 1993.

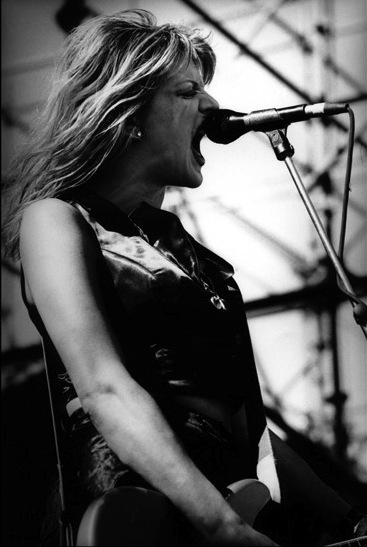
Courtney Love performing with Hole at Big Day Out in Melbourne, January 1995

Live Through This was released on April 12, 1994, one week after Love's husband, Kurt Cobain, was found dead in his Seattle home. In the wake of Love's family tragedy, Live Through This was a critical success. It spawned several popular singles, including "Doll Parts", "Violet", and "Miss World", going multi-platinum and being hailed "Album of the Year" by Spin magazine. NME called the album "a personal but secretive thrash-pop opera of urban nihilism and passionate dumb thinks", and Rolling Stone said the album "may be the most potent blast of female insurgency ever committed to tape".

Despite the critical praise for Live Through This, rumors circulated insinuating that Cobain had actually written the majority of the album, though the band vehemently denies this. The band's drummer Patty Schemel, who had been friends with Cobain since the late 1980s, said: "There's that myth that Kurt [Cobain] wrote all our songs—it's not true. Courtney and Eric wrote Live Through This." The band did, however, state that Love convinced Cobain to provide backing vocals on "Asking for It" and "Softer, Softest" while visiting the studio, and music producers and engineers present during the recording sessions noted that Cobain seemed "completely unfamiliar" with the songs. According to Rolling Stone rock journalist Gavin Edwards, Love and Cobain had written songs together in the past, but opted to not release them because it was "a bit too redolent of John and Yoko".

In 1994, bassist Kristen Pfaff went into a drug treatment facility to treat her heroin addiction. Pfaff contemplated leaving the band for health reasons. In June 1994, she was found dead of a heroin overdose in the bathroom of her Seattle home, two months after the death of Cobain. The band put their impending tour on hold, pulling out of the upcoming Lollapalooza festival.

Recruiting bassist Melissa Auf der Maur over the summer, they commenced their world tour on August 26 at the Reading Festival in England, giving a performance that John Peel described as "teetering on the edge of chaos". The band embarked on a worldwide tour throughout late 1994 and for the duration of 1995, with appearances at the KROQ Almost Acoustic Christmas, Saturday Night Live, the Big Day Out festival, MTV Unplugged, the 1995 Reading Festival, Lollapalooza 1995, and at the MTV Video Music Awards, where they were nominated for the "Doll Parts" music video.

Love's reckless stage presence during the tour became a media spectacle, drawing press from MTV and other outlets due to her unpredictable performances. While touring with Sonic Youth, Love got into a physical fight with Kathleen Hanna backstage at a 1995 Lollapalooza festival and punched her in the face. In an August 1995 band interview with Rolling Stone, drummer Patty Schemel formally came out as a lesbian, saying: "It's important. I'm not out there with that fucking pink flag or anything, but it's good for other people who live somewhere else in some small town who feel freaky about being gay to know that there's other people who are and that it's okay." In a retrospective interview, Schemel said:

We had a really safe place [in Hole]. Courtney was a force that would not allow any of us to be spoken down to—or any of that kind of behavior in a space that we were in—no matter where we were. She was good at that. I felt safe in my band to come out as a gay woman.

Toward the end of the tour, the band released their first EP, titled Ask for It, in September 1995; it featured 1991 Peel session recordings, as well as covers of songs by Wipers and the Velvet Underground. The band performed its last show of the year on September 3, 1995, at the Molson Polar Beach Party in Tuktoyaktuk, Northwest Territories, Canada. The concert was a promotional event for the Molson Brewery, and also featured performances by Metallica, Veruca Salt, and Moist.

==== 1996–1999: Celebrity Skin ====
In 1996, the band recorded and released a cover of Fleetwood Mac's "Gold Dust Woman" for The Crow: City of Angels (1996) soundtrack, the band's first studio song to feature Melissa Auf der Maur on bass, and produced by Ric Ocasek. Hole released two retrospective albums during this time: firstly, their second EP, titled The First Session (1997), which consisted of a complete version of the band's first recording session at Rudy's Rising Star in Los Angeles in March 1990, some of which had been bootlegged widely years prior. It featured the group's first ever recorded track, "Turpentine", which had previously been unreleased to the public. The same year, the band released their first compilation album, My Body, The Hand Grenade (1997), featuring early singles, b-sides and recent live tracks.

Our band is a collective, but Courtney has a lot of ideas and it's weird how they infiltrate our lives—it just happens. Like with the drowning theme, there were all these things going on while we were making this album, like Jeff Buckley drowning. And years before [bassist] Kristen [Pfaff] died in a bathtub. My father died basically drowning in his own body, he couldn't breathe, and Melissa's father died of lung cancer. Those were literal things, but drowning became a metaphor for this record and for all the people we had lost.

— Eric Erlandson on writing Celebrity Skin

In 1997, the band entered Conway Recording Studios in Los Angeles after attempts to write new material in Miami, New Orleans, London, and New York. Recorded over a ten-month period, Hole's third studio album, Celebrity Skin (1998), adopted a complete new sound for the band, incorporating elements of power pop, and had Love drawing influences from Fleetwood Mac and My Bloody Valentine. According to Erlandson, Love was more focused on song-writing and singing than playing guitar on the record; Love stated that her aim for the album was to "deconstruct the California sound" in the L.A. tradition of bands like The Doors, The Beach Boys and The Byrds. In addition to Hole, Smashing Pumpkins frontman Billy Corgan entered the studio and helped perfect five of the album's twelve songs. Love, who felt she was in a creative slump, likened Corgan's presence in the studio to "a math teacher who wouldn't give you the answers but was making you solve the problems yourself".

Upon the album's release, Corgan told CNN that he should have "been given credit [for writing the entire album]". Erlandson responded to Corgan's statements in a Rolling Stone interview, commenting: "We were working on all the stuff that Courtney and I had already written. Billy really facilitated things, in a way ... I would bring in the music, Courtney would start coming up with lyrics right away, and [Billy] would help map it all out." Erlandson also stated: "Courtney writes all her own lyrics. Nobody else is writing those lyrics and nobody ever has." One journalist took note of the controversy when reviewing the album, stating: "Back in 1994, the acclaim for Live Through This was undercut by whispers that Love's late husband wrote the album. Combine those conspiracy theories with the unfounded but persistent rumor that Cobain was actually murdered, and it is no surprise that, in the song 'Celebrity Skin', Love calls herself a walking study in demonology."

Although Schemel is listed as drummer in the liner notes of the record, her drumming does not actually appear on the record; she was replaced by session drummer Deen Castronovo, under pressure from producer Michael Beinhorn. After the replacement, Schemel quit the band. Though Love and Erlandson had authorized Schemel's replacement, both expressed regret in retrospect, and Love stated in 2011 that Beinhorn was notorious for replacing drummers on records, and referred to him as "a Nazi". After Schemel's departure, the band hired drummer Samantha Maloney for their upcoming tours and music videos.

Celebrity Skin was a critical success with strong sales and successful singles, including the title track, "Celebrity Skin", "Malibu", and "Awful". The album received largely positive reviews, with praise from music periodicals such as Rolling Stone, NME, and Blender, as well as a four-star review from the Los Angeles Times, calling it a "wild emotional ride" sure to be "one of the most dissected and debated collections of the year". The album peaked at number 9 on the Billboard 200, and garnered the band its first and only number 1 single, "Celebrity Skin", which topped the Modern Rock Tracks. "Malibu", released December 29, 1998, was the album's second single; it charted at number 3 on the Modern Rock Tracks.

=== 1999–2002: Final tour and disbandment ===
In the winter of 1998–99, Hole went on tour to promote Celebrity Skin, joining Marilyn Manson, who was promoting his album, Mechanical Animals (1998) on the Beautiful Monsters Tour. The tour turned into a publicity magnet, and Hole dropped out of the tour nine dates in, due to both the majority of the fans being Manson's, and the 50/50 financial arrangement between the groups, with Hole's production costs being disproportionately less than Manson's. Manson and Love often mocked one another onstage, and Love attacked Manson's stage antics, which included tearing up a Bible during performances: "You know, whenever somebody rips up the Bible in front of 40,000 people, I think it's a big deal", she said during a 1999 interview. Hole officially announced that they would be dropping out of the tour after a poorly received concert at the Rose Garden Arena in Portland, Oregon, which ended with Manson fans booing the band.

The band continued to book shows and headline festivals after dropping off Manson's tour, and according to Auf der Maur, it was a "daily event" for Love to invite audience members onstage to sing with her for the last song at nearly every concert performance. On June 17, 1999, during Hole's set at the Hultsfred Festival in Sweden, a 19-year-old girl died after being crushed by the mosh pit behind the mixing board. Hole played its final show at Thunderbird Stadium in Vancouver on July 14, 1999.

In October 1999, Auf der Maur quit Hole and went on to become a touring bassist for The Smashing Pumpkins. Samantha Maloney also quit a few months later. The band's final release was a single for the movie Any Given Sunday (1999). "Be a Man", released in March 2000, was an outtake from the Celebrity Skin sessions. In April 2002, Love called The Howard Stern Show and said she had written nine songs with songwriter Linda Perry, but less than a month later Love and Erlandson officially disbanded Hole via a message posted on the band's website. After the split, the four musicians each took on projects of their own: Erlandson continued to work as a producer and session musician, eventually forming the experimental group RRIICCEE with controversial artist Vincent Gallo. Love began a solo career, releasing her debut, America's Sweetheart, in 2004, featuring several of the songs written with Perry. Melissa Auf der Maur also embarked on a solo career, and released her self-titled debut album in 2004, which included Erlandson performing lead guitar on the track, "Would If I Could". Her second album, Out of Our Minds, was released in March 2010. Hole's body of work from its inception to its first disbandment includes thirteen singles, three LPs, three EPs, and one compilation album.

=== 2009–2013: Reformation ===
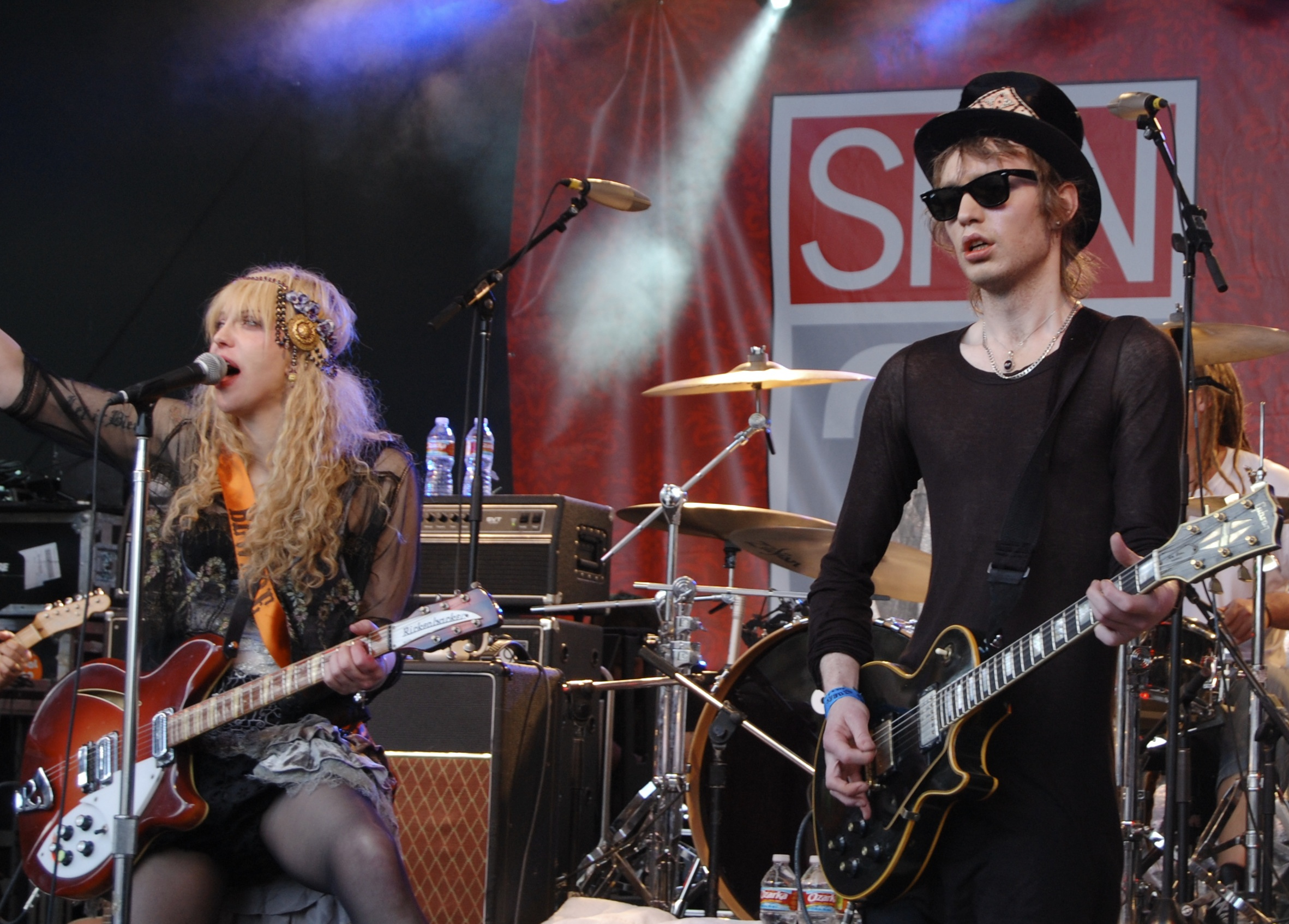
Love and Micko Larkin performing with Hole at SXSW in Austin, Texas, 2010

On June 17, 2009, seven years after Hole's disbandment, NME reported that Love was re-forming the band with guitarist Micko Larkin for an upcoming album, on which Melissa Auf der Maur would be providing backup vocals. Days later, Melissa Auf der Maur stated in an interview that she was unaware of any reunion, but said Love had asked her to contribute harmonies to an upcoming album. In response, Eric Erlandson stated in an interview with Spin magazine that a reunion could not take place without his involvement, citing that he and Love "have a contract".

Hole launched a new website and various social media pages on January 1, 2010, and performed on Friday Night with Jonathan Ross in February. On February 17, 2010, they played a full set at the O2 Shepherd's Bush Empire, with support from Little Fish. On March 16, the first Hole single in ten years was released, titled "Skinny Little Bitch"; it peaked at No. 29 on the Billboard Rock Chart, and at No. 21 on the Alternative Singles chart. The track also received airplay on Active rock and alternative radio.

Nobody's Daughter was released on April 26, 2010, worldwide on Mercury Records, and was received moderately well by music critics. Rolling Stone gave the album three out of five stars, but noted "[while Love] was an absolute monster vocalist in the nineties, the greatest era ever for rock singers ... She doesn't have that power in her lungs anymore – barely a trace. But at least she remembers, and that means something in itself." The magazine also referred to the album as "not a true success", but a "noble effort". Love's voice, which had become noticeably raspier, was compared to the likes of Bob Dylan. NME gave the album a 6/10 rating, and Robert Christgau rated it an "A−", saying, "Thing is, I can use some new punk rage in my life, and unless you're a fan of Goldman Sachs and BP Petroleum, so can you. What's more, better it come from a 45-year-old woman who knows how to throw her weight around than from the zitty newbies and tattooed road dogs who churn most of it out these days. I know—for her, BP Petroleum is just something else to pretend about. But the emotion fueling her pretense is cathartic nevertheless." In support of the release, Hole toured extensively between 2010 and 2012 throughout North America and Europe, as well as performing in Russia and Brazil.

On March 28, 2011, Love, Erlandson, Patty Schemel and Auf der Maur appeared at the New York screening of Schemel's documentary Hit So Hard: The Life and Near-Death Story of Patty Schemel at the Museum of Modern Art. The appearance was the first time in thirteen years that all four members appeared together in public. Schemel had expressed a desire to record with Love, Erlandson and Auf der Maur stating "nothing has been discussed, but I have a feeling." After the screening, the four took part in a Q&A session where Love stated: "For me, as much as I love playing with Patty – and I would play with her in five seconds again, and everyone onstage – if it's not moving forward, I don't wanna do it. That's just my thing. There's rumblings; there's always bloody rumblings. But if it's not miserable and it's going forward and I'm happy with it ... that's all I have to say about that question."

In May 2011, a music video for "Samantha" was shot in Istanbul, although it remained officially unreleased. In September 2011, Scott Lipps joined the band, replacing drummer Stu Fisher. In April 2012, Love, Erlandson, Auf der Maur and Schemel reunited at the Public Assembly in New York for a two-song set, including "Miss World" and the Wipers' "Over the Edge", at an after-party for the Hit So Hard documentary. The performance marked the first time the four members performed together since 1998 after Schemel's departure and the 2002 breakup of the band.

On December 29, 2012, Love performed a solo acoustic set in New York City, and in January 2013, performed at the Sundance Film Festival under her own name. She booked further performances across North America as a solo act, with Larkin, bassist Shawn Dailey, and Lipps as her backing band.

=== 2014–2016: Second disbandment ===
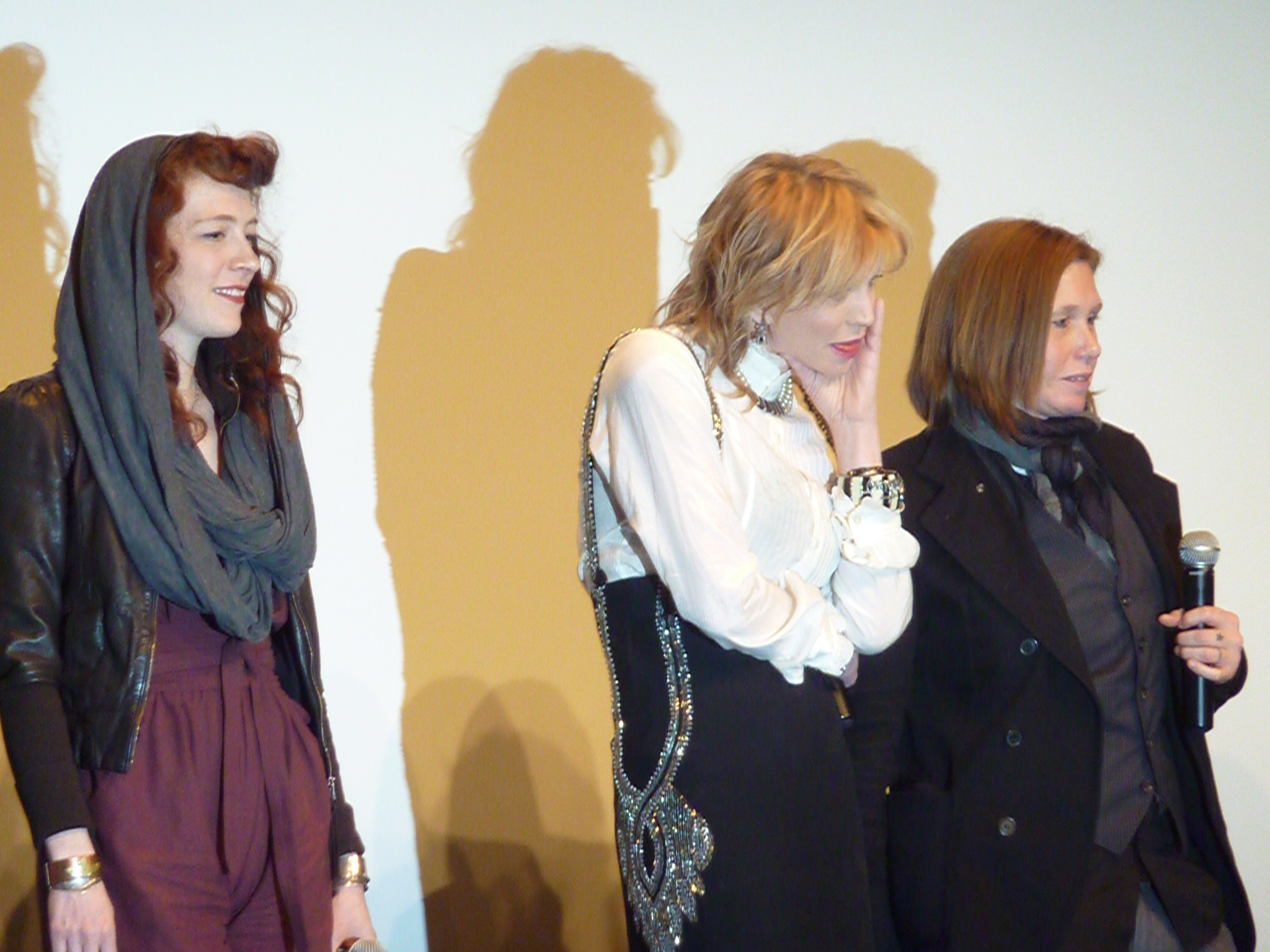
Melissa Auf der Maur, Courtney Love, and Patty Schemel at a screening of Hit So Hard (2012) at the Museum of Modern Art, New York City

On December 28, 2013, Love posted two photos of herself with Erlandson on Facebook and Twitter, with a caption reading: "And this just happened ... 2014 going to be a very interesting year." Love also tagged Melissa Auf der Maur as well as Hole's former manager, Peter Mensch, in the post, alluding to a reconciliation with Erlandson and possible reunion in 2014.

On April 2, 2014, Rolling Stone reported that the Celebrity Skin line-up of the band had reunited (with Patty Schemel in lieu of Samantha Maloney). Rolling Stone erroneously reported Love's upcoming solo single, "Wedding Day" to be a product of this reunion. Shortly after, Love curtailed her statement, saying: "We may have made out but there is no talk of marriage. It's very frail, nothing might happen, and now the band are all flipping out on me." On May 1, in an interview with Pitchfork, Love discussed the possibility of a reunion, and also stated it had been "a mistake" releasing Nobody's Daughter as a Hole record in 2010. "Eric was right—I kind of cheapened the name, even though I'm legally allowed to use it. I should save 'Hole' for the lineup everybody wants to see and had the balls to put Nobody's Daughter under my own name." Love further discussed the possibility of reuniting the band, saying:

No one's been dormant. Patty teaches drumming and drums in three indie bands. Melissa has her metal-nerd thing going on—her dream is to play Castle Donington with Dokken. Eric hasn't flipped—I jammed with him, he's still doing his Thurston [Moore]-crazy tunings, still corresponding with Kevin Shields. We all get along great. There are bands who reunite and hate each others' guts.

=== 2019–present: Possible reformation and attempted reunions ===
In October 2019, Hole were photographed rehearsing in Los Angeles, with Love, Erlandson, Auf der Maur, and Schemel reunited.

In March 2020, Love and Auf der Maur planned a performance at the "Bans Off My Body" event, which was eventually canceled due to the COVID-19 pandemic.

== Artistry ==
=== Composition ===
Initially, Hole drew inspiration from no wave and experimental bands, which is evident in their earliest recordings, specifically "Retard Girl", but frontwoman Love also drew from a variety of influences. Love cited post-punk group Echo & the Bunnymen and classic rock such as Neil Young and Fleetwood Mac. The band's first album, Pretty on the Inside, was heavily influenced by noise and punk rock, using discordant melodies, distortion, and feedback, with Love's vocals ranging from whispers to guttural screams. Love described the band's earliest songwriting as being based on "really crazy Sonic Youth tunings". Nonetheless, Love claimed to have aimed for a pop sound early on: "There's a part of me that wants to have a grindcore band and another that wants to have a Raspberries-type pop band", she told Flipside magazine in 1991. Both Love and Erlandson were fans of the notorious LA punk band the Germs. In a 1996 interview for a Germs tribute documentary, Erlandson said: "I think every band is based on one song, and our band was based on "Forming" ... Courtney brought it into rehearsal, and she knew, like, three chords and it was the only punk rock song we could play."

The band's second album Live Through This, captured a less abrasive sound, while maintaining the group's original punk roots. "I want this record to be shocking to the people who don't think we have a soft edge, and at the same time, [to know] that we haven't lost our very, very hard edge", Love told VH1 in 1994. The group's third album, Celebrity Skin, incorporated power pop into their hard rock sound, and was heavily inspired by California bands; Love was also influenced by Fleetwood Mac and My Bloody Valentine while writing the album. The group's 2010 release, Nobody's Daughter, featured a more folk rock-oriented sound, utilizing acoustic guitar and softer melodies.

The group's chord progressions by and large drew on elements of punk music, which Love described as "grungey", although not necessarily grunge. Critics described their song style as "deceptively wispy and strummy", combined with "gunshot guitar choruses". Although the group's sound changed over the course of their career, the dynamic between beauty and ugliness has often been noted, particularly due to the layering of harsh and abrasive riffs which often bury more sophisticated arrangements.

Other influences Hole have cited included Big Black, Joy Division, Smashing Pumpkins, the Wipers, the Pixies, R.E.M., Superchunk, the Cars, Sonic Youth, the Pretenders, the Runaways, Patti Smith, PJ Harvey, Sex Pistols, Green River, the Melvins, Nirvana, Babes in Toyland, Cheap Trick, Frank Black and Beat Happening.

=== Lyrical content ===
In a 1991 interview, Love stated that lyrics were "the most important" element of songwriting for her. Her lyrics explored a variety of themes throughout Hole's career, including body image, rape, child abuse, addiction, celebrity, suicide, elitism, and inferiority complexes; all of which were addressed mainly from a female, and often feminist standpoint. This underlying feminism in Love's lyrics often led the public and critics to mistakenly associate her with the riot grrrl movement, of which Love was highly critical.

In a 1991 interview with Everett True, Love said: "I try to place [beautiful imagery] next to fucked up imagery, because that's how I view things ... I sometimes feel that no one's taken the time to write about certain things in rock, that there's a certain female point of view that's never been given space." Charles Cross has referred to her lyrics on Live Through This as being "true extensions of her diary", and she has admitted that a great deal of the lyrics from Pretty on the Inside were excisions from her journals.

Throughout Hole's career, Love's lyrics were often influenced by literature: The title of the band's second album Live Through This, for example (as well as lyrics from the track "Asking for It") is directly drawn from Gone With the Wind; and the group's single "Celebrity Skin" (the title track to their 1998 album), contains quotes from Shakespeare's The Merchant of Venice and Dante Rossetti's poem A Superscription. Love had had a minor background in literature, having briefly studied English literature in her early twenties.

=== Performances ===
Throughout the duration of the 1990s, the band received widespread media coverage due to Love's often rambunctious and unpredictable behavior onstage. The band often destroyed equipment and guitars at the end of concerts, and Love would ramble between songs, bring fans onstage, and stage dive, sometimes returning with clothes torn off of her or injuries sustained. In a 1995 New York magazine article, journalist John Homans addressed Love's frequent stage diving during Hole's concerts:

The most shocking, frightening, and fascinating image in rock in the last few years is Courtney Love's stage dive ... When some male performers do it, it looks like muscular, frat-boy fun, controlled aggression ... For obvious reasons, the practice was strictly no-girls-allowed, but Love, typically, decided that she wanted to do it, too. Groped, ravaged, she compared the experience to being raped, wrote a song about it, and now does it just about every show.

Nina Gordon of Veruca Salt, who toured with Hole in 1995, recalled Love's erratic behavior onstage, saying "She would just go off and [the rest of the band] would just kind of stand there." The majority of Love's chaotic behavior onstage was a result of heavy drug use at the time, which she admitted: "I was completely high on dope; I cannot remember much about it." She later criticized her behavior during that time, saying: "I [saw] pictures of how I looked. It's disgusting. I'm ashamed. There's death and there's disease and there's misery and there's giving up your soul ... The human spirit mixed with certain powders is not the person, it's [a] demonic presence."

Love's stage attire also garnered notoriety, influenced in part by Carroll Baker's wardrobe in the film Baby Doll (1956). The style was later dubbed "kinderwhore" by the media, and consisted of babydoll dresses, slips and nightgowns, and smeared makeup. Kurt Loder likened her onstage attire to a "debauched ragdoll", and John Peel noted in his review of the band's 1994 Reading Festival performance, that "[Love], swaying wildly and with lipstick smeared on her face, hands and, I think, her back, as well as on the collar of her dress, ... would have drawn whistles of astonishment in Bedlam. The band teetered on the edge of chaos, generating a tension which I cannot remember having felt before from any stage." Rolling Stone referred to the style as "a slightly more politically charged version of grunge; apathy turned into ruinous angst, which soon became high fashion's favorite pose."

The band's set lists for live shows were often loose, featuring improvisational jams and rough performances of unreleased songs. By 1998, their live performances had become less aggressive and more restrained, although Love continued to bring fans onstage, and would often go into the crowd while singing.

== Legacy ==
Hole was one of the most commercially successful female-fronted alternative rock bands in history, selling over 3 million records in the United States between 1991 and 2010. In spite of Love's often polarizing reputation in the media, Hole received consistent critical praise for their output, and was often noted for the predominant feminist commentary found in Love's lyrics, which scholars have credited as "articulating a third-wave feminist consciousness". Love's subversive onstage persona and public image coincided with the band's songs, which expressed "pain, sorrow, and anger, but [an] underlying message of survival, particularly survival in the face of overwhelming circumstances". Music journalist Maria Raha expressed a similar sentiment in regard to the band's significance to third-wave feminism, stating, "Whether you love Courtney [Love] or hate her, Hole was the highest-profile female-fronted band of the '90s to openly and directly sing about feminism."

While Rolling Stone compared the effect of Love's marriage to Cobain on the band to that of John Lennon and Yoko Ono, they noted that "Love's confrontational stage presence, as well as her gut-wrenching vocals and powerful punk-pop songcraft, made her an alternative-rock star in her own right." Author Nick Wise made a similar comparison in discussion of the band's public image, stating, "Not since Yoko Ono's marriage to John Lennon has a woman's personal life and exploits within the rock arena been so analyzed and dissected."

The band has been cited as a major influence on several contemporary artists, including indie singer-songwriter Scout Niblett, Brody Dalle (of The Distillers and Spinnerette), Sky Ferreira, Lana Del Rey, Tove Lo, Tegan and Sara, Annie Hardy (of Giant Drag), Victoria Legrand (of Beach House), Wilt, and Sam Forrest (of Nine Black Alps). The band ranked at number 77 on VH1's 100 Greatest Hard Rock Artists list.

== Materials loss ==
In 2008 a fire swept through Universal Studios Hollywood destroying buildings belonging to Universal Music Group. News reports said that many artists including Hole had lost recordings in the fire. Love and the band were one of the artists suing UMG for the loss; however, on August 16, 2019, the band was removed from that lawsuit as it was amended "based on UMG's representations that none of Hole's original masters were destroyed (subject to confirmation)".

== Members ==
- Courtney Love – lead vocals, rhythm guitar (1989–2002, 2009–2012)
- Eric Erlandson – lead guitar (1989–2002, 2012)
- Mike Geisbrecht – rhythm guitar (1989–1990)
- Lisa Roberts – bass (1989–1990)
- Caroline Rue – drums (1989–1992)
- Jill Emery – bass (1990–1992)
- Patty Schemel – drums (1992–1998, 2012)
- Leslie Hardy – bass, backing vocals (1992–1993)
- Kristen Pfaff – bass, backing vocals (1993–1994; died 1994)
- Melissa Auf der Maur – bass, backing vocals (1994–1999, 2012)
- Samantha Maloney – drums (1998–2000)
- Micko Larkin – lead guitar (2009–2012)
- Shawn Dailey – bass (2009–2012)
- Stu Fisher – drums (2009–2011)
- Scott Lipps – drums (2011–2012)

Timeline

== Discography ==
- Pretty on the Inside (1991)
- Live Through This (1994)
- Celebrity Skin (1998)
- Nobody's Daughter (2010)

== Accolades ==
Accolades for Hole
Award	Year	Category	Nominated work(s)	Result
Grammy Awards	1999	Best Rock Album	Celebrity Skin	Nominated
Grammy Awards	1999	Best Rock Song	"Celebrity Skin"	Nominated
Grammy Awards	1999	Best Rock Vocal Performance by a Duo or Group	"Celebrity Skin"	Nominated
Grammy Awards	2000	Best Rock Vocal Performance by a Duo or Group	"Malibu"	Nominated
MTV Video Music Awards	1995	Best Alternative Video	"Doll Parts"	Nominated
MTV Video Music Awards	1999	Best Cinematography	"Malibu"	Nominated
NME Awards	1999	Best Band	Hole	Nominated
NME Awards	1999	Best Album	Celebrity Skin	Nominated
NME Awards	1999	Best Single	"Celebrity Skin"	Nominated
Spin Readers' Poll Awards	1994	Album of the Year	Live Through This	Won

== Sources ==
- Anderson, Kyle (2007). Accidental Revolution: The Story of Grunge. New York City, New York: St. Martin's Griffin. ISBN 978-1-466-83860-4.
- "Courtney Love". Behind the Music. Viacom Media Networks. June 21, 2010. VH1.
- Rue, Carolyn (December 22, 2022). "Carolyn Rue Interviewed" (Interview). Interviewed by Mikayla Beyer – via YouTube.
- Bogdanov, Vladimir; Woodstra, Chris; Erlewine, Stephen Thomas (2002). All Music Guide to Rock: The Definitive Guide to Rock, Pop, and Soul. San Francisco, California: Backbeat Books. ISBN 978-0-879-30653-3.
- Brite, Poppy Z. (1998). Courtney Love: The Real Story. New York City, New York: Simon & Schuster. ISBN 978-0-684-84506-7.
- Burns, Lori; Lafrance, Mélisse (2002). Disruptive Divas: Feminism, Identity & Popular Music. New York City, New York: Taylor & Francis, Routledge. ISBN 978-0-8153-3554-2.
- Carson, Mina Julia; Lewis, Lisa; Shaw, Susan M., eds. (2004). Girls Rock!: Fifty Years of Women Making Music. Lexington, Kentucky: The University Press of Kentucky. ISBN 978-0-8131-2310-3.
- Crawford, Anwen (2014). Hole's Live Through This. 33 1/3. New York City, New York: Bloomsbury USA. ISBN 978-1-623-56377-6. OCLC 883749105.
- Diehl, Matt (2007). My So-Called Punk. New York City, New York: St. Martin's Griffin. ISBN 978-0-312-33781-0.
- Edwards, Gavin (2006). Is Tiny Dancer Really Elton's Little John?: Music's Most Enduring Mysteries, Myths, and Rumors Revealed. New York City, New York: Three Rivers Press. ISBN 978-0-307-34603-2.
- Erlandson, Eric (2012). Letters to Kurt. New York City, New York: Akashic Books. ISBN 978-1-61775-083-0.
- Gaar, Gillian G. (2002). She's a Rebel:The History of Women in Rock & Roll. New York City, New York: Seal Press. ISBN 978-1-58005-078-4.
- Feigenbaum, Anna (November 2, 2007). Tasker, Yvonne; Negra, Diane (eds.). Interrogating Postfeminism: Gender and the Politics of Popular Culture. Console-ing Passions. Durham, North Carolina: Duke University Press. p. 135. ISBN 978-0-8223-4032-4.
- Hogg, Karen (2001). Guitar Styles – Women in Rock: The Guitarist's Guide to Music of the Masters, Book & CD. Los Angeles, California: Alfred Music Publishing. ISBN 978-0-739-02016-6.
- Hole: Celebrity Skin (songbook). New York City; Milwaukee, Wisconsin: Cherry Lane Music. 1999. ISBN 978-1-57560-137-3.
- Kallen, Stuart A. (2012). The History of Alternative Rock. New York City, New York: Greenhaven Publishing. ISBN 978-1-420-50972-4.
- Klaffke, Pamela (2003). Spree: A Cultural History of Shopping. Vancouver, British Columbia: Arsenal Pulp Press. ISBN 978-1-55152-143-5.
- Lankford, Ronald D. Jr. (2009). Women Singer-Songwriters in Rock: A Populist Rebellion in the 1990s. Lanham, Maryland: Scarecrow Press. ISBN 978-0-8108-7268-4.
- Latham, David (2003). Haunted Texts: Studies in Pre-Raphaelitism in Honour of William E. Fredeman. Toronto, Ontario: University of Toronto Press. ISBN 978-0-8020-3662-9.
- Love, Courtney (2006). Dirty Blonde: The Diaries of Courtney Love. New York City, New York: Faber & Faber. ISBN 978-0-86547-959-3.
- Marks, Craig (February 1995). "Endless Love". Spin. Vol. 10, no. 11. pp. 42–52. ISSN 0886-3032.
- Meltzer, Marisa (2010). Girl Power: The Nineties Revolution in Music. New York City, New York: Faber & Faber. ISBN 978-0-86547-979-1.
- Schippers, Mimi A. (2002). Rockin' Out of the Box: Gender Maneuvering in Alternative Hard Rock. Rutgers, New Jersey: Rutgers University Press. ISBN 978-0-8135-3075-8.
- Strong, Catherine (2011). Grunge: Music and Memory. Burlington, Vermont: Ashgate. ISBN 978-1-4094-2376-8.
- Strong, Martin Charles; Peel, John (2002). The Great Rock Discography. New York City, New York: Canongate Books. ISBN 978-1-841-95615-2.
- Thompson, Dave (2000). Alternative Rock. New York City, New York: Backbeat Books. ISBN 978-0-87930-607-6.
