= Shawn Dailey =

- Born: December 7, 1981 (age 43); Santa Barbara, CA
- Genres: Rock
- Occupation(s): Bassist, artist manager
- Instrument: Bass guitar
- Years active: 1995–present

Shawn Dailey (born December 7, 1981) is an American bassist, music manager and producer from Santa Barbara, California.

== Television ==
Performed on the following:

- Letterman - Rock Kills Kid, Hole
- Leno - Hole
- Craig Ferguson - Rock Kills Kid
- Carson Daly - Rock Kills Kid (2 times)
- The View - Hole, Plain White T’s
- Jools Holland (UK) - Hole
- Jonathan Ross (UK) - Hole
- Jimmy Kimmel - Hole
