= Melissa Auf der Maur discography =

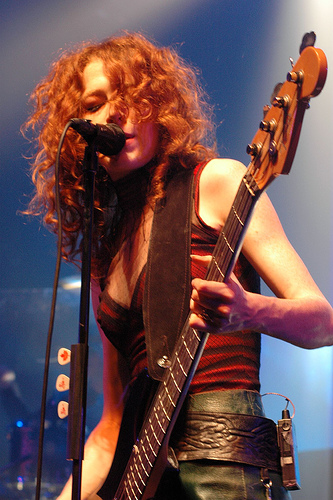
- Auf der Maur, live in 2004
- Studio albums: 2
- Extended plays: 2
- Singles: 5
- Music videos: 5

This is a comprehensive listing of official releases by Melissa Auf der Maur, best known for her work in the alternative rock band Hole. Auf der Maur has released two solo studio albums, two extended plays and five singles, all of which have accompanying music videos.

Her first self-titled studio album, Auf der Maur was released in 2004 and was followed by Out Of Our Minds in 2010. Out Of Our Minds (commonly abbreviated as OOOM) is "part of a multidisciplinary Viking-themed project that includes a short film and comic book." This discography does not include material by Tinker, Hole, The Smashing Pumpkins, Hand Of Doom or The Chelsea.

== Studio albums ==
Year	Details	Chart positions											Sales
Year	Details	AUT	BEL	FRA	GER	GRE	NLD	SWE	SWI	UK	US Billboard 200	US Heat	Sales
2004	Auf der Maur: Released: February 1, 2004; Label: Capitol; Formats: CD, digital download	50	38	47	32	—	54	59	54	31	187	8	US: ~35,000; Worldwide: 200,000
2010	Out of Our Minds: Released: March 30, 2010; Labels: PHI-MAdM Music, Inc.,^{[I]} Roadrunner; Formats: CD, LP, digital download	—	—	178	—	36	—	—	52	148	—	—	
"—" denotes a release that did not chart.

- I PHI-MAdM Music, Inc. is the title of Auf der Maur's own label, a subsidiary of PHI, based in Montréal, Canada.

== Extended plays ==
Year	Details
2008	...This Would Be Paradise: Released: November 11, 2008; Label: Urbinated Music; Formats: 7", digital download
2009	OOOM: Released: December 7, 2009; Label: PHI-MAdM Music, Inc.; Formats: CD, 7", digital download

== Singles ==
Year	Single	Chart positions		Album
Year	Single	US Alt	UK	Album
2004	"Followed the Waves"	32	35	Auf der Maur
2004	"Real a Lie"	—	33	Auf der Maur
2004	"Taste You"	—	51	Auf der Maur
2009	"Out of Our Minds"	—	—	Out of Our Minds
2010	"Meet Me on the Dark Side"	—	—	Out of Our Minds
"—" denotes a release that did not chart.

== Other musical contributions ==
Year	Album	Chart positions		Additional information
Year	Album	U.S.	UK	Additional information
1997	Troublizing	-	-	with Ric Ocasek
1998	Celebrity Skin	8	11	with Hole
2000	Judas O	-	-	with The Smashing Pumpkins, bass on track 12 only, "Rock On"
2001	Poses	117	132	with Rufus Wainwright, bass and backing vocals on track 11 only
2002	Paradize	-	-	with Indochine, vocals and bass on track 8 ("Le Grand Secret") only
2003	Rock n Roll	33	41	with Ryan Adams, backing vocals only
2007	Traffic and Weather	97	-	with Fountains of Wayne, backing vocals on track 1, "Someone to Love", only
2007	Act 2: The Blood and the Life Eternal	-	-	with Neverending White Lights, vocals on track 4, "The World Is Darker", only

== See also ==
- Hole discography
