= Out of Our Minds (song) =

Single by MAdM

from the album Out of Our Minds
- B-side: "Lead Horse"
- Released: November 9, 2009
- Recorded: 2007 at French Kiss Recording in Pembroke, Ontario, Canada and Cherokee Studios in Los Angeles, California, United States
- Genre: Alternative rock
- Length: 4:34
- Label: PHI-MAdM Music, Inc, Roadrunner Records
- Songwriter(s): Melissa Auf der Maur, Jordon Zadorozny, Vince Nudo
- Producer(s): Jordon Zadorozny, Melissa Auf der Maur

MAdM singles chronology
"Taste You" (2004)	"Out of Our Minds" (2009)	"Meet Me on the Dark Side" (2010)

"Out of Our Minds" (also abbreviated as "OOOM") is a song by Canadian alternative rock musician, Melissa Auf der Maur, written by Auf der Maur, long-time collaborator and producer Jordon Zadorozny and Priestess drummer Vince Nudo. The song was released as Auf der Maur's fourth single, and first from her second studio album of the same name, on November 9, 2009 as a free digital download.

== Origin and recording ==
"Out of Our Minds" was originally written solely by Auf der Maur prior to the conception of the OOOM project. Speaking of the song's origins in January 2010, she said that it was "written early in the creative chapters of [the project]" after "[a] rush of inspiration" and developed both the song and project from thereon. The "rush of inspiration" described by Auf der Maur was later cited to be how she "found the center" of her new musical endeavor. In an interview with The Dumbing of America, Auf der Maur explained the embryonic version of the song:

"First was this wail, this ancient wail that just sort of came over me. And then literally the words just fell out of my mouth. Some songs just come clear, they zap through you like a lightning bolt and some are more labor intensive. This just came flying out of me and the words travel out of our minds into our hearts standing by and our hearts have been standing by for so long. I just realized at that moment that that's the story. This is the message I want to portray throughout not only the record but I knew I was looking for a theme to build this fantasy film and comic book around. It had a lot to do with the way the song came out — that it was clear, that it was the most clear and truthful."

The album version of "Out of Our Minds" was recorded over the course of 2007 at various locations throughout North America. The majority of the song was recorded at French Kiss Recording, co-writer Zadorozny's recording facility in Pembroke, Ontario in Canada, with additional recording at Cherokee Studios in Los Angeles, California in the United States. Further, but minor, recording and "tweeking" was done at La Hacienda and Sunset Lodge Studios in California, Ponderosa Studios and Planet Studios in Quebec, Warehouse Recording in British Columbia, and Ishlab Music and The Clubhouse in New York City. The master recording of the song was mastered by Adam Ayan at Gateway Mastering in Portland, Maine in the United States.

== Composition and lyrics ==
"Out of Our Minds" diverges significantly from Auf der Maur's previous work, both musically and lyrically. The song was composed in standard tuning and opens with a thin distorted guitar riff. Following an introduction that complements its album predecessor due to its prominent drumming, "The Hunt", the instrumentation is reverted to a sole bass riff (E#-F). It is quickly followed by an underlying repetitive guitar riff that is featured throughout all of the verses, though mixed alternately in different verses. The music dynamic pre-chorus is almost identical to the intro, however, is alternately paced. The song's chorus features a different guitar structure to the verse but the bass line (D#-C--F-G) uses a soft-loud dynamic that is reminiscent of 1990s alternative rock compositions. A post-chorus breakdown uses similar chords to the verses, beginning with E#-F, but progresses to a lower key (B?-B#). Overall, the song features an ABCD song format.

Lyrically, the song explores an "ethereal journey." The line "travel out of our minds / and into our hearts / standing by" is used a number of times throughout and Auf der Maur refers to this as "very apropos of the 21st century." Interpretation of the song's meaning differ, however, a common interpretation is that it explores the tension between passion and reason, giving it a psychological schematic. Auf der Maur stated in an interview with ARTISTdirect in May 2010 that the lyrics were written from a purely modern perspective, despite the medieval basis of the OOOM project, and it was difficult to "find our honest, emotional truth and the feminine balance to the wars going on and the destruction to mother nature." Furthermore, she summed up the song describing it as "a very innocent mirror being held up to what's going on and what may need to be done on a very personal and internal level."

== Release ==
The song was released to radio in the United States and Canada in November 2009 and later to European radio in early 2010. However, it did not receive as much airplay as the single's predecessors; "Followed the Waves", "Real a Lie" and "Taste You"; due to lack of commercial promotion as Auf der Maur was not signed to a major label. Roadrunner Records distributed the single in Europe, including Ireland, United Kingdom, Germany, France, Netherlands, Italy, Iceland, and Poland and through its promotional airplay also enabled Auf der Maur to be featured on, and interviewed in some cases, on BBC Radio 1, XFM, Planet Rock, Kerrang Radio and Q Radio in the UK and RTÉ 2FM in Ireland. A domestic release of the song was featured as a free digital download from Auf der Maur's official web site on November 9, 2009 and a limited edition 7" vinyl version of the single, with "Lead Horse" as a b-side, was featured in the Full OOOM package of Out of Our Minds official release on March 29, 2010. In efforts to promote the domestic release of the single, Auf der Maur performed a five-date Canadian tour lasting from November 18 to 24, 2009 being supported by Stone Temple Pilots. Despite its amount of promotion, the single failed to chart.

== Critical reception ==
Critical response to the song's single release, and its inclusion on the album, was mixed. Tom Edwards of the NME described it as "the kind of overblown rock posturing left untapped since the early '90s" but also as a "guilty pleasure", giving it a 5/10 rating. Music Feeds Australia stated that it was an "interesting track, with industrial-lite riffs with Billy Corgan influenced lyrics" and although it was "darker in texture then the bands she has played in, the bleak sound lends itself as a soundtrack you'd expect to hear on a Marvel comic based movie."

== Music video ==
A promotional music video for the song, based on the concept movie of the same name and directed by Tony Stone, was premiered on Auf der Maur's official site on January 12, 2010. Recorded in 2007 alongside the film, the video features a female character, played by Auf der Maur, crashing her car in a dark forest and discovering mythical elements within the forest, such as a river which contains a Viking helmet, a comet and an abandoned crypt. The video follows an identical form of direction, uses identical imagery and is a musical counterpart to the related OOOM film.

Speaking of the music video, Auf der Maur said:

"Essentially, it's an eternal female character on the hunt for the heart, looking for the center. In the video, there's that lost-in-time secretary who gets in a car crash. She time travels to find the heart of a Viking—the heart of a bleeding tree. As a woman, I'm just an extension of any woman at any time on the planet earth trying to find the heart of her reason for being here—the heart of her record the heart of her relationship and so on. I'd say every single song on the album is coming from that place, but "Out of Our Minds" says it best."

The music video, as well as an exclusive making-of documentary, were included in the official release of Out of Our Minds. The videos were included as part of a download, in Apple Video format, upon purchase of Full OOOM from Auf der Maur's official online store. Both videos were also included as bonus content on the OOOM DVD.

== Track listing ==
All songs written by Melissa Auf der Maur, Jordan Zadorozny and Vince Nudo.

Digital download

1. "Out of Our Minds" – 4:34

Limited edition 7" vinyl

1. "Out of Our Minds" - 4:34
2. "Lead Horse" - 3:48

European promotional CD

1. "Out of Our Minds" (radio edit) - 3:54

== Personnel ==
Musicians

- Melissa Auf der Maur - vocals, bass
- Jordan Zadorozny - guitar
- Vince Nudo - drums, guitar

Technical personnel

- Jordan Zadorozny - producer, engineer
- Melissa Auf der Maur - producer
- Alan Moulder - mixing
