= Steve Durand =

Canadian rock musician

- Born: Stephen Durand; Cantley, Quebec, Canada
- Genres: Alternative rock, indie rock, electronica
- Occupations: Singer-songwriter, multi-instrumentalist, composer
- Instruments: Guitar, bass, keyboards
- Years active: 1993–present
- Label: Capitol
- Website: thesparklingbrown.com

Stephen "Steve" Durand (born) is a Canadian rock musician, most notable for his work with Tinker and his involvement with Melissa Auf der Maur.

== Early musical career ==
Born in Cantley, Quebec, Durand met Melissa Auf der Maur, a fellow student at Concordia University, while she was DJing at a bar on Montréal's Boulevard Saint-Laurent. After a number of jam sessions, Auf der Maur and Durand recruited drummer Jordon Zadorozny and formed Tinker in 1993.

Tinker gained reputation in the local music scene and released two singles throughout the course of their career, "Green Machine" and "Real a Lie", the latter of which would be reworked by bandmate Auf der Maur during her solo career. The band opened for The Smashing Pumpkins at Metropolis, Montréal on November 30, 1993. Auf der Maur left Tinker in June 1994 after agreeing to join Hole after bassist Kristen Pfaff died.

== Auf der Maur and later musical projects ==
While Auf der Maur was in Hole, and also after her departure in 1999, she wrote a number of songs she planned to release as a solo project. With the help of Durand, Auf der Maur wrote "Skin Receiver" and a redone "Real a Lie", a single she and Durand wrote in Tinker. The duo entered the studio in 2003 and began work on Auf der Maur's solo album, which was eventually released in 2004. Auf der Maur featured Durand playing lead guitar and co-writer on two tracks. He also performed guitar on all tours for Auf der Maur.

In 2004, Durand formed Moufette with Ariel Engle. The band released their debut album, Chew Your Heart in 2005 on the indie label High Tide Records. Their first EP, Pet the Lion was released in 2009.

Durand was also heavily involved in Auf der Maur's second studio album, Out of Our Minds, again performing as a musician and co-writer of the track "1000 Years." He has since been touring again with Auf der Maur.

== Collaborative discography ==
- "Green Machine", single by Tinker (1993)
- "Real a Lie", single by Tinker (1994)
- Auf der Maur, studio album by Auf der Maur (2004)
  - "Followed the Waves", single from Auf der Maur
  - "Real a Lie", single from Auf der Maur
  - "Taste You", single from Auf der Maur
- Chew Your Heart, studio album by Moufette (2005)
- Pet the Lion, extended play by Moufette (2009)
- Out of Our Minds, studio album by MAdM (2010)
  - "Out of Our Minds", single from Out of Our Minds
- A New Level, studio album by Dirty Red Shoes (2011)
