= Moufette =

Canadian musical group

- Origin: Montreal, Quebec, Canada
- Genres: Alternative rock, indie pop
- Years active: 2004-present
- Labels: High Tide Records
- Members: Steve Durand; Ariel Engle

Moufette is a Canadian indie rock group whose name is the French word for 'Skunk'. They were formed in Montreal in 2004. The duo, which includes Steve Durand - formerly of Tinker and known for his work with Auf der Maur - and Ariel Engle, also mix electrionica and folk music in to their standard indie/pop sound. Their first album was released in 2005, and their first extended play was released in 2009.

== Discography ==
- Chew Your Heart (2005)
- Pet the Lion (2009)
