= This Would Be Paradise =

...This Would Be Paradise

EP by MAdM (Melissa Auf der Maur)
- Released: 11 November 2008
- Recorded: 2008
- Genre: Alternative rock

MAdM (Melissa Auf der Maur) chronology
Auf der Maur (2004)	...This Would Be Paradise (2008)	OOOM (2009)

Digital cover

...This Would Be Paradise is the debut EP by the Canadian alternative rock musician Melissa Auf der Maur, released on November 11, 2008, on Urbinated Music. It was Auf der Maur's first independent release following her departure from Capitol Records in 2006. Two of the three songs featured on the EP—"The Key" and "This Would Be Paradise"— were later released on Auf der Maur's second studio album, Out of Our Minds (2010). The EP's second track "Willing Enabler" was an EP-only track.

The EP was recorded during the sessions Out of Our Minds during 2007 and 2008 and produced by Auf der Maur, Jordon Zadorozny and Chris Goss. Auf der Maur self-financed the recording and released the EP as a digital download package and limited edition 7" record. Auf der Maur embarked on a six date North American and European tour to support the EP's release. Upon its release, the EP received positive reviews but failed to chart. Following its release, Auf der Maur was signed to PHI, a multimedia production company based in Montreal, Quebec, Canada. The title is a quote from Canadian Tommy Douglas, who said "...if only [humankind] could walk the earth like a man, this would be paradise."

== Track listing ==
All tracks are written by Melissa Auf der Maur

No.	Title	Length
1.	"The Key"	3:56
2.	"Willing Enabler"	4:16
3.	"This Would Be Paradise"	2:46
Total length:		10:58

== Personnel ==
All personnel credits adapted from Out of Our Minds's liner notes.

Musicians

- Melissa Auf der Maur – vocals (1, 2), guitar (1), bass (1, 2), autoharp, omnichord, keyboards (3), producer (1–3)
- Jordon Zadorozny – bass, producer, engineer (3)
- Jeordie White – guitar (1, 2)
- Josh Freese – drums (1, 2)

Technical personnel

- Chris Goss – producer (1)
- Edmund P. Monsef – mixing
- Adam Ayan – mastering
