= Severed Ways =

- Directed by: Tony Stone
- Written by: Tony Stone
- Produced by: Tony Stone
- Starring: Tony Stone; Fiore Tedesco
- Cinematography: Nathan Corbin; Damien Paris
- Edited by: Tony Stone
- Distributed by: Magnet
- Release dates: June 22, 2007 (Los Angeles Film Festival); March 13, 2009 (United States)
- Running time: 107 minutes
- Country: United States
- Box office: $18,728

Severed Ways: The Norse Discovery of America is a 2007 independent adventure drama film that tells a story of Norse explorers battling nature, natives and Christianity in North America in the year 1007 AD. It was written, directed, edited and produced by Tony Stone who also plays one of the lead characters.

The story is told in near-documentary film fashion, using only natural light, with an initial shaky camera technique that eventually slows down into smoother cinematography. It has very little dialog and a soundtrack featuring anachronistic heavy metal music. Though unrated, the film shows human-to-human violence, animal killing, defecation, and sex. It is a remake of the 1978 film The Norseman.

The film received mixed reviews, with critics commenting on aspects of poor production quality and on Stone's innovative use of the camera.

== Plot ==
Two Viking men are stranded in Newfoundland, Canada when their party of explorers loses a battle with Skraelings (indigenous peoples). The two men move northward, hoping to link up with an expedition led by Leif Ericson. They deal differently with the grim situation, one turning inward spiritually and the other reverting to a primal state, but both men are beset with memories of their earlier lives. Orn (Tony Stone) remembers his wife (Gaby Hoffmann), and Volnard (Fiore Tedesco) flashes back to his childhood home and his Christian sister (Clare Amory) who committed suicide after Volnard killed the man who converted her to Christianity. Traveling, they encounter two Irish monks who have escaped from another Viking party—one monk (Sean Dooley) is murdered at first, and a makeshift Christian church is burned down. The other monk (David Perry) joins the journey. The Viking men disagree about the monk and they separate. On his own, Orn meets a beautiful native Abenaki woman (Noelle Bailey) who drugs and rapes him. Volnard bonds with the surviving Christian monk who washes his feet. An Abenaki man trails Volnard, intending to kill him. Orn finds Volnard and the monk and kills the monk, enraging Volnard. The two Vikings fight, but spare each other. The next day, the Abenaki man kills Volnard and is then killed by Orn, who builds a funeral pyre for his dead countryman. The strange cold land ultimately prevails over Orn.

== Cast ==
- Tony Stone as Orn
- Fiore Tedesco as Volnard
- Gaby Hoffmann as Orn's wife
- Clare Amory as Volnard's sister
- David Perry as an Irish monk
- Sean Dooley as the second monk
- Noelle Bailey as an Abenaki woman
- Nathan Corbin as a Viking thrall
- James Fuentes as an Abenaki man

== Theme ==
The film's setting was inspired by the story of Thorfinn Karlsefni, an Icelandic explorer who followed Leif Ericson to Vinland (North America) hoping to establish a colony at the beginning of the 11th century.

== Production ==
Establishing shots for Severed Ways were made in Maine and Newfoundland, including L'Anse aux Meadows, an early Viking encampment site. Most of the scenes of human interaction were filmed in rural Vermont over several years (ending in autumn 2006) on wooded land owned by Tony Stone's family. Stone, a resident of New York City, was familiar with this land from spending "three or four months a year" there in his youth. He wanted a location where he could do whatever he wished, free of big city limitations. He said, "I've always had this dichotomy between being super rural and super urban."

With very little budget but aiming for a "grand scale", Stone used two lightweight HD PRO digital video cameras for a sense of immediacy, capturing the action only in natural light. Stone said he employed shaky camera techniques at the beginning of the film to convey an off-balance feeling similar to that of the two main characters lost in a new land. As the story developed, Stone slowed the camera movements. He wished to give a sense that the natural environment would eventually close in over the lost men; to show the story "from the point of view of the trees and the woods".

The film is unrated, having never been submitted to the Motion Picture Association of America film rating system for review. Stone is shown defecating in the film, and he slaughters and butchers a chicken. Scenes of brutal violence—murder and rape—are part of the story.

The characters speak very little in the film. The speech is subtitled in English on the film's theatrical print; the DVD offers English or Spanish subtitles. The English subtitles are in idiomatic Modern English, for instance, one of the characters says, "We're toast if we stay here." Another piece of dialog, spoken during a meal, is "This fish is really killer." What dialoge is spoken is actually edited Ingmar Bergman's medieval films The Seventh Seal and The Virgin Spring. The dialoge does not match the subtitles.

The film also appropriates a scene from Quest for Fire in which a burning stick is tossed at wolves.

=== Music ===
The film's score, primarily heavy metal music of the black metal and death metal subgenres, consists of previously released tunes by Old Man's Child, Melissa Auf der Maur, Dimmu Borgir, Morbid Angel, Brian Eno, Judas Priest, Popol Vuh and Queens of the Stone Age. Stone chose anachronistic music that would reinforce "the belief system of these vikings ...the warrior spirit, the harshness, the visuals of battle, the pagan side."

Parts of two different songs by Burzum are played as the Vikings encounter a North American native. Varg Vikernes, whose solo musical project is known as Burzum, was convicted in 1994 of murdering Øystein Aarseth (aka Euronymous), a Norwegian musician and occasional business partner of Vikernes, and he was convicted of four counts of arson—burning down historic wooden Christian churches in Norway. Like Vikernes, Stone's film character Orn expresses distaste for Christianity and an unyielding faith in Odin and Thor.

== Release ==
Severed Ways was shown on June 8, 2007, in the 43-seat Wilshire Screening Room as a competitor in the Los Angeles Film Festival.

The film opened theatrically in New York City on March 13, 2009, at one theater: the Angelika Film Center. It remained open for two weeks, grossing $18,728 at the box office.

It was released on DVD by Magnet Releasing and Magnolia Home Entertainment on July 28, 2009. The DVD offers subtitles in English or Spanish. Extra features include six minutes of two deleted scenes, ambient footage of nature and Newfoundland, and the church-burning scene. In Australia, the DVD was released with a Restricted MA15+ rating, warning those under 15 years of age against its "Strong themes and violence." Netflix and Amazon offer the film as "Not Rated", but Walmart lists it as having an R rating.

== Critical response ==
If nothing else, Mr. Stone, from his tangled hair to dirty feet, has taken himself and his story into the beyond—way, way beyond.

— The New York Times

The film received mixed criticism. Regarding viewer reactions, Stone said, "It seems like a love or hate thing." The New York Times noted Stone's adroit use of the beautiful natural scenery but criticized his lack of a "coherent tone" and described the grittier parts of the film as undermining "the moments of grandeur." Stone was compared favorably to filmmaker Werner Herzog for some of the film but in other scenes "his characters are running around like costumed geeks at a comic-book convention."

Variety criticized the poor production, beginning with "still-breathing corpses—an early warning of the semi-amateur production values to come." Variety ridiculed the slangy language of the subtitles: "really killer" and "we're toast". The magazine praised Stone for his ability "to disappear into the wilderness—and his character—with minimal crew."

The Village Voice was sharply critical, saying Stone should have been stopped from making the film. The Voice wrote that "the spectacle of two dudes mucking about in the primal forest becomes tedious as Stone embraces a '70s dippiness".

The Boston Globe wrote that most of the scenes "look like a homemade educational reenactment", and that the film was "Part Werner Herzog wilderness trial, part epic music video, part religious commentary, part jest". Otherwise, the Globe praised Stone's competence, his "refreshingly open eye", and how the camera "swoops and lopes and circles."

== See also ==
- List of historical drama films
