= Ted K =

2021 American film by Tony Stone

- Theatrical release poster
- Directed by: Tony Stone
- Written by: Gaddy Davis; John Rosenthal; Tony Stone
- Produced by: Sharlto Copley; Matt Flanders; Tony Stone
- Starring: Sharlto Copley
- Cinematography: Nathan Corbin; Ethan Palmer
- Edited by: Tony Stone; Troy Herion; Robert Mead; Brad Turner
- Music by: Blanck Mass
- Production companies: Heathen Films; Hideout Pictures; Verisimilitude Films; In Your Face Entertainment
- Distributed by: Super Ltd (United States); Neon (International)
- Release dates: March 1, 2021 (Berlin); February 18, 2022 (United States)
- Running time: 122 minutes
- Country: United States
- Language: English
- Box office: $51,544

Ted K is a 2021 American independent biographical crime drama film directed, co-produced, and co-edited by Tony Stone, and co-written by Stone, Gaddy Davis, and John Rosenthal. Starring Sharlto Copley as Ted Kaczynski, the film follows the titular mathematics professor who, after quitting his job to live as a survivalist in Lincoln, Montana, becomes a domestic terrorist and launches a nationwide mail bombing campaign in protest of modern technology and the destruction of nature. Following the publication of his manifesto by The Washington Post, Kaczynski is dubbed the Unabomber by the media, and his actions prompt the Federal Bureau of Investigation to conduct their largest and most expensive investigation in history.

Ted K premiered in the Panorama section at the 71st Berlin International Film Festival on March 1, 2021, and was theatrically released in the United States February 18, 2022. The film received critical acclaim, with particular praise for Stone's direction and Copley's performance.

== Plot ==
Since 1971, mathematics prodigy Ted Kaczynski has lived a primitive life in a remote cabin near Lincoln, Montana. He hunts for his food and lives without electricity or running water. He strongly believes modern technology is destroying the planet.

Kaczynski witnesses the destruction of the wilderness surrounding his cabin and concludes that living in nature is impossible. He goes to the library and acquires the address of Percy Wood, the president of United Airlines. He damages a neighbor's snowmobile, cuts down a power line, and destroys nearby construction equipment. He grows frustrated with the number of jets flying over his home, calling it his breaking point. To fight back against the destruction of nature, he creates a plan for revenge.

Kaczynski mails bombs to important people that he believes will harm society. The Federal Bureau of Investigation (FBI) becomes involved when a bomb injures and nearly kills Wood inside his house. Kaczynski changes his appearance by shaving his beard and slamming his nose against a cinder block. Computer store owner Hugh Scrutton is the first to die from one of his bombs.

Eighteen months later, Kaczynski is in desperate need of money. He argues with his brother David over the phone. He writes a 35,000-word manifesto and uses the word "we" when writing to local newspapers about the bombings. The country begins to refer to him as the "Unabomber". He sends a letter to The New York Times and The Washington Post, promising to stop his bombing spree if they publish his manifesto. The Washington Post complies on September 19, 1995.

David recognizes the prose style of the manifesto as Ted's and reports his suspicions. The FBI arrest Kaczynski in 1996. He is given life in a supermax prison in Florence, Colorado, for killing three people and injuring twenty-three others. An epilogue recognizes the manhunt for Ted Kaczynski as the largest in FBI history.

== Cast ==
- Sharlto Copley as Ted Kaczynski
- Drew Powell as Tom
- Bob Jennings as Carter
- Christian Calloway as Tommy
- Tahmus Rounds as Tommy Sauerkraut
- Sal Rendino as Gilbert
- Wayne Pyle as Gary Dryce
- Amber Rose Mason as Becky
- Travis Bruyer as Ranger Gary
- Megan Folsom as Mrs. Hill
- Andrew Senn as Mikey
- Keith Barber as F.B.I. Agent White

== Production ==
Sharlto Copley announced his involvement in the film in early 2018. Musician Melissa Auf der Maur, Stone's wife, served as one of the executive producers.

Filming took place over four seasons in and around Lincoln, Montana.

== Release ==
The film premiered at the 71st Berlin International Film Festival, on March 1, 2021. It was also screened at the Red Sea International Film Festival. In March 2021, Neon's Super Ltd acquired the film's distribution rights. Ted K was released in the United States on February 18, 2022.

== Reception ==
=== Box office ===
In the United States and Canada, the film earned $20,851 from twenty-eight theaters in its opening weekend, and $2,385 from nine theaters in its second weekend.

=== Critical reception ===
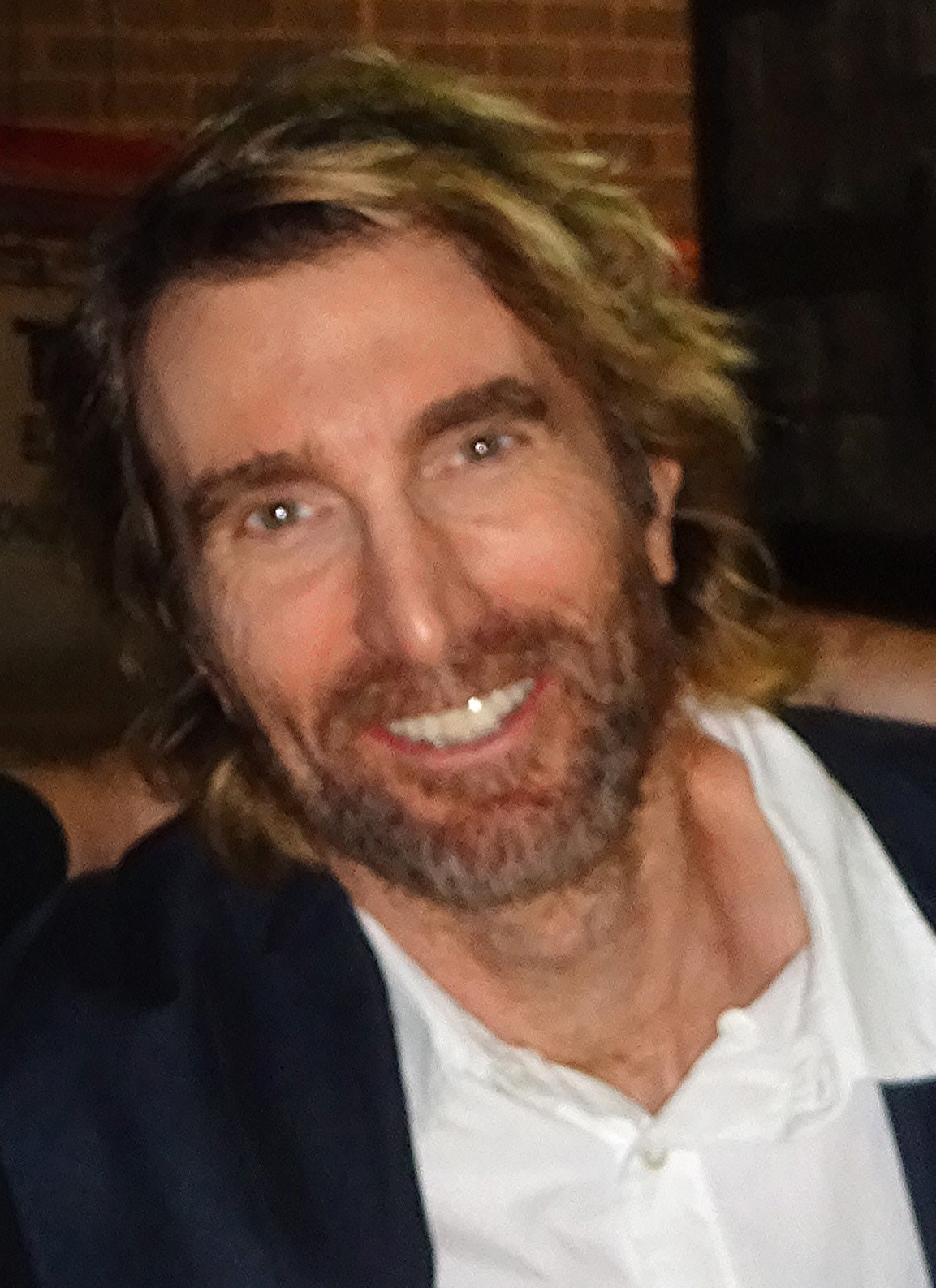
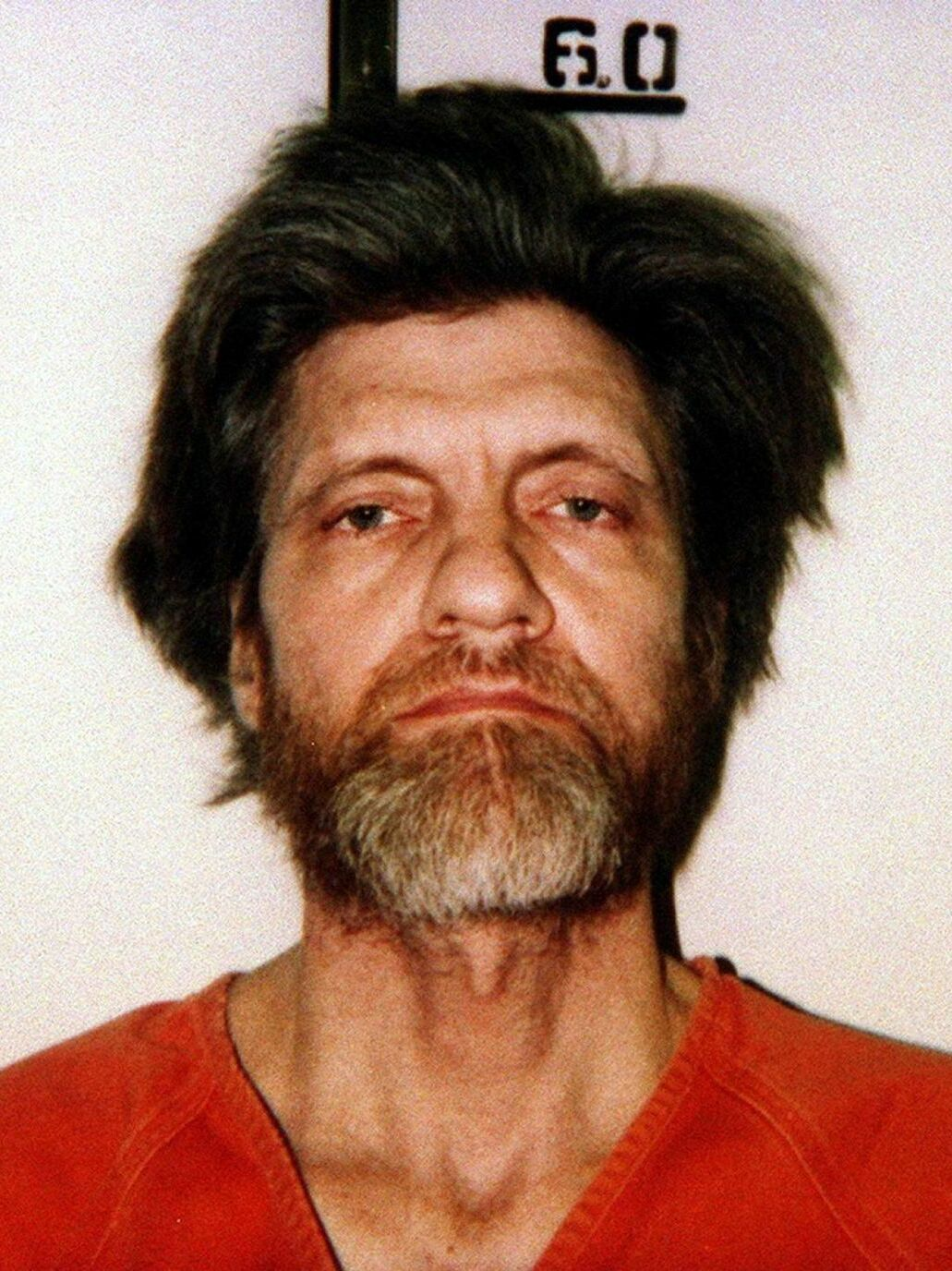
Sharlto Copley (left) received praise for his performance as Ted Kaczynski (right).

On the review aggregator website Rotten Tomatoes, 85% of 40 critics' reviews are positive, with an average rating of 6.5/10. The website's consensus reads: "The movie's merits might be debatable, but Sharlto Copley ensures Ted K is never less than grimly compelling." Metacritic, which uses a weighted average, assigned the film a score of 70 out of 100, based on 13 critics, indicating "generally favorable" reviews.

Peter Bradshaw of The Guardian said "Copley excels behind a straggly beard in this portrait of the serial terror-bomber". Christy Lemire of RogerEbert.com praised Copley's performance, Tony Stone's direction, and the sound design but was critical of the reliance on fantasy sequences which she felt were unnecessary. Nadir Samara of Screen Rant criticized the two-hour runtime but said "it's Copley's performance that sells it."

=== Accolades ===
Award	Date of ceremony	Category	Recipient(s)	Result	Ref(s)
Camerimage	November 20, 2021	Main competition	Tony Stone	Nominated	
Fantasy Filmfest	October 17 – November 7, 2021	Fresh Blood Award	Tony Stone	Nominated	
Stockholm International Film Festival	November 2021	Bronze Horse	Tony Stone	Nominated	
