= Basilica Hudson =

Arts and performance venue in Hudson, New York

Coordinates: 42.25188889°N 73.79861111°W

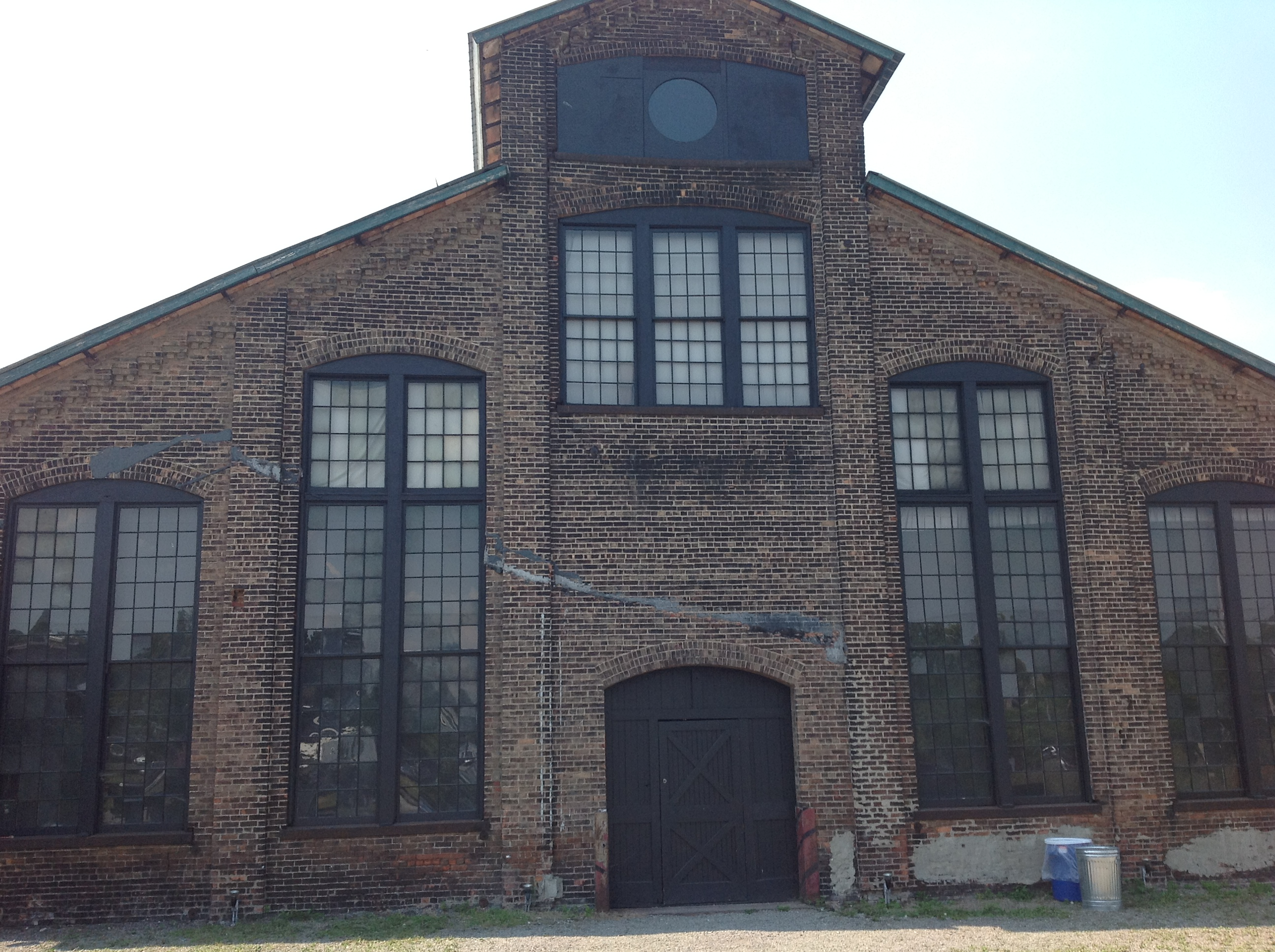
- Exterior of Basilica Hudson (2012)
- Interactive map of Basilica Hudson
- Location: 110 S Front St, Hudson, NY 12534

Website
- www.basilicahudson.org

Basilica Hudson is an arts and performance venue in Hudson, New York, US. It was established in 2010 out of a 19th-century factory located near the city's "South Bay" riverfront along the Hudson River.

Basilica Hudson schedules its programming between spring and fall. Events range from film screenings and visual art exhibitions, to annual farmers' and flea markets with local vendors. It is the setting for the annual Basilica SoundScape festival and the 24 Hour Drone music festival,

Its creative directors in 2013 are musician Melissa Auf der Maur and independent filmmaker Tony Stone.

In 2012, The Guardian named Basilica Hudson one of the ten best industrial-chic spaces worldwide.

== History of the site ==
The building that currently houses Basilica Hudson was originally built in the 1880s as a foundry that produced railroad car wheels. Later, it was converted into a glue factory that closed in the 1980s.

In 1999, the site was slated for inclusion in a redevelopment proposal by the Americlean corporation to build a processing facility for the dry cleaning solvent perchloroethylene. The successful campaign to defeat this proposal was led by the newly formed Friends of Hudson environmental organization. After the defeat of the Americlean proposal, the property was acquired by a Florida developer who sought unsuccessfully to establish an arts center.

In 2001, developers and civic activists Patrick Doyle and Catherine Dodge Smith acquired the property and opened it as a community arts center under the name Basilica Industria. The venue was the site of a 2003 Patti Smith concert benefiting the Friends of Hudson campaign to stop development of a 1,800-acre cement plant in neighboring town of Greenport. By 2008, musician Melissa Auf der Maur and filmmaker Tony Stone, then newcomers to Hudson, began curating events, filming, and holding band practice in the space.

In 2010, Doyle and Smith sold the property to Auf der Maur, Stone, and his parents, artists Bill Stone and Nancy Stone. They renamed the property 'Basilica Hudson' and repurposed it as an arts and performance venue. Basilica Hudson launched its music and arts programming in the summer of 2012. In 2012, the Albany, NY-based publication Metroland named Basilica Hudson the "best new venue" in the Capital Region. In 2012, The Guardian named Basilica Hudson one of the ten best industrial-chic spaces worldwide.

== Operation of venue ==
Basilica Hudson is an 18,000 sq. ft. space with a maximum capacity for 1,200 people. It schedules its programming between spring and fall. Basilica Hudson has attracted international acclaim for its unusual program of events and its owners' commitment to supporting the creative community of the Hudson Valley region. Events range from film screenings and visual art exhibitions, to annual farmers' and flea markets with local vendors. It is the setting for the annual Basilica SoundScape festival, described as 'the antifestival' by various publications for its thoughtful mix of music, visual art and literature. Basilica Hudson is also home to the 24 Hour Drone music festival, which sees festival-goers camp in the space for a round-the-clock, non-stop 24-hour performance by a selection of experimental artists.
