= Tony Stone (filmmaker) =

American independent filmmaker

- Occupation: Filmmaker

Tony Stone is an American independent filmmaker. His notable work includes writing and directing the films Severed Ways (2007) and Out of Our Minds (2009), directing the documentary Peter and the Farm (2016), and cinematography for R.E.M.'s music video "It Happened Today". In 2022, he created the well-received crime drama Ted K, starring Sharlto Copley as the Unabomber.

He co-owns the Basilica Hudson performance venue with his wife, musician Melissa Auf der Maur.
