= Tinker (band) =

Canadian alternative rock band

- Origin: Montréal, Quebec, Canada
- Genres: Alternative rock, indie rock
- Years active: 1993–1996
- Past members: Melissa Auf der Maur, Steve Durand, Jordon Zadorozny, Tony Labao, Alexander MacSween

Tinker was a Canadian alternative rock band, formed in Montréal in 1993 by Melissa Auf der Maur and Steve Durand. The band reached limited success, before Auf der Maur left and became bassist for Hole. Durand and Zadorozny joined Auf der Maur's solo band in 2002 and worked on both of Auf der Maur's studio albums, Auf der Maur and Out of Our Minds.

== History ==
=== Formation, local reputation, and post Auf der Maur's departure (1993–1996) ===
While Auf der Maur was majoring in photography at Concordia University, she worked as a DJ at a bar on Montréal's Boulevard Saint-Laurent. The bar was a spot for many local musicians, and after the bar closed at night, musicians would often go to a rehearsal space and jam. During this time, Melissa met guitarist Steve Durand, a fellow student at Concordia. Melissa, Steve, and drummer Jordon Zadorozny formed Tinker in 1993.

As the band were gaining reputation in the local music scene, The Smashing Pumpkins returned to Montréal in 1993 for one date. The band initially planned on having an American band open for their shows, but Auf der Maur decided to ask frontman Billy Corgan whether Tinker could open for them in one of her letters. Corgan agreed and Tinker performed their largest show, to an audience of 2500, at Metropolis on November 30, 1993. The band released two singles, "Real a Lie" and "Green Machine" with the band's original lineup.

After Melissa's departure the band shuffled their line up adding Eric Digras on Bass and Patrick Conan on Drums. They went on to release an EP called Receiver in 1995 which featured the song Skin Receiver that would later be reworked and appear on Melissa Auf der Maur's debut album Auf der Maur. In 1996, Tinker released their final album Soft Shell Friend.

=== Auf der Maur joins Hole (1994–1999) ===
Auf der Maur left Tinker in late 1994 to join Hole. Hole were looking for a bass player after Kristen Pfaff died after a drug overdose on June 16, 1994. Frontwoman, Courtney Love, was organizing auditions and Billy Corgan recommended Auf der Maur. Auf der Maur initially refused the audition. However, she reconsidered after a conversation with her father, Nick Auf der Maur.

=== Hole breakup and involvement in Auf der Maur (1999–present) ===
Melissa Auf der Maur left Hole on October 20, 1999. She recruited her former Tinker bandmates to join her solo band and toured throughout 2002–03 before hitting the studio. The result was Melissa's first solo album, the eponymous Auf der Maur. "Real a Lie" would later be reworked and released in 2004 under Auf der Maur's solo project. Though he did not perform on the album, Zadorozny produced the album, as well as her second album, Out of Our Minds on which Durand wrote one track.

== Members ==
- Melissa Auf der Maur - vocals, bass guitar
- Steve Durand - guitar, vocals
- Jordan Zadorozny - guitar, vocals, drums
- Tony Labao - drums
- Eric Digras - bass, vocals
- Patrick Conan - drums
- Alexander MacSween (1992–1994)

== See also ==
- Melissa Auf der Maur
- Hole
