= Real a Lie =

Single by Auf der Maur

from the album Auf der Maur
- B-side: "My Foggy Notion" (demo version)
- Released: February 2, 2004
- Recorded: 2003–2004
- Genre: Alternative rock
- Length: 4:22
- Label: Capitol
- Songwriters: Melissa Auf der Maur, Steve Durand
- Producers: Chris Goss, Melissa Auf der Maur

Auf der Maur singles chronology
"Followed the Waves" (2004)	"Real a Lie" (2004)	"Taste You" (2004)

"Real a Lie" (also known as "Real, a Lie") is the second single from Auf der Maur's self-titled solo debut. The song failed to chart in the United States, however, due to a successful tour of the United Kingdom, it fared slightly better than "Followed the Waves" there, peaking at #33.

== Background and production ==
"Real a Lie" was one of the many songs written by Melissa Auf der Maur over a 12-year period from 1992 to 2004. Originally titled "Realalie", the song was first performed by her original band, Tinker, which also included co-writer Steve Durand, and was released as the band's second single in 1994, which was backed with the b-side "Saxon Princess." Auf der Maur later reworked the song during the recording sessions for Auf der Maur in 2003-4 featuring a layer Wall of sound of guitars and reworked lyrics. The song was featured as the third track on the album.

== Track listing and formats ==
- CD single
1. "Real a Lie" – 4:22 (Auf der Maur, Steve Durand)
2. "My Foggy Notion" (demo version) – 4:13 (Auf der Maur)
- Maxi single
1. "Real a Lie" – 4:22
2. "Afraid" – 3:38 (Christa Paeffgen)
3. "Taste You" (acoustic) – 4:49 (Auf der Maur)
4. "Real a Lie" (enhanced video)
- Limited UK 7" vinyl single
1. "Real a Lie" – 4:22
2. "Afraid" – 3:38
- European promo CD
1. "Real a Lie" (radio edit) – 3:33
2. "Real a Lie" (album version) – 4:22

== Music video ==
A promotional music video was created for the single in 2004 and released on May 3, 2004. The video is compiled of photographs of Auf der Maur performing "Real a Lie" and was recorded in still motion.

== Chart positions ==
Chart (2004)	Peak position
United Kingdom	33

== Musicians and personnel ==
=== Musicians and performers ===
- Melissa Auf der Maur – lead vocals, bass, additional guitar
- Steve Durand – lead guitar
- Chris Goss – additional guitar, backing vocals
- Jordon Zadorozny – additional guitar
- Jeordie White – additional guitar
- Brant Bjork – drums
- John Stanier – additional drums
- Nick Oliveri – additional bass, backing vocals
- Kellii Scott – additional drums
- Atom Willard – additional drums

=== Production personnel ===
- Chris Goss – producer, engineer
- Melissa Auf der Maur – additional production
- Martin Schmelzle – engineer
- Matt Mahaffey – engineer, mixer (on "Afraid")
- Ben Grosse – mixer
