= Out of Our Minds (film) =

- Directed by: Tony Stone
- Story by: Melissa Auf der Maur; Tony Stone
- Produced by: Melissa Auf der Maur; Chemi Karasawa; Nancy Barber; Ben Scola
- Starring: Melissa Auf der Maur; Eliza Douglas; Mark Peetsma; Stephen G. Rhodes; John Rosenthal; Jeremy Gibson; Damien Paris
- Cinematography: Tony Stone; Nathan Corbin; Niles Roth
- Edited by: Tony Stone
- Music by: Melissa Auf der Maur; The Entrance Band
- Distributed by: PHI; Heathen Films
- Release date: January 16, 2009 (Sundance)
- Running time: 30 minutes
- Countries: Canada; United States

Out of Our Minds (often abbreviated as OOOM) is a 2009 fantasy film written by Melissa Auf der Maur and directed by Tony Stone. Starring Auf der Maur as the female protagonist, the film tells the mythological story of "a fantasy world where a Viking heart, a car crash and a bleeding forest connect." The film uses a musical score, composed entirely by Auf der Maur and her band, and features no dialogue in order to focus on the "striking optics" and was released as "part of a multi-disciplinary Viking-themed project that includes a short film and comic book", as well as accompanying her second studio album of the same name.

Development on Out of Our Minds began as early as 2005, when Auf der Maur began the recording sessions for the album, and pre-production began in summer 2006. Independently self-produced and financed, the film itself was shot over the course of two years, in autumn 2006 and spring 2007 in Stone's hometown in Vermont, United States, where he had previously directed the simarly-themed Severed Ways: The Norse Discovery of America (2007). Out of Our Minds premiered at the 2009 Sundance Film Festival on January 16, 2009, and was also screened at the Woodstock Film Festival and NXNE among others. During her North American and European tours in support of the album in 2009 and 2010, Auf der Maur also held screenings of the film. The film was released on DVD as part of her package including the album and comic book on March 30, 2010.

The film received positive critical reception upon its release with various reviews citing it as a "manifestation of an idea created amidst a life devoted to artmaking," "crazily ambitious," and "spectacular."
