= Followed the Waves =

Single by Auf der Maur

from the album Auf der Maur
- B-side: "Good News"
- Released: 2004
- Recorded: 2003
- Genre: Alternative rock
- Length: 4:48
- Label: Capitol
- Songwriter: Melissa Auf der Maur
- Producers: Chris Goss, Melissa Auf der Maur

Auf der Maur singles chronology
"Followed the Waves" (2004)	"Real a Lie" (2004)

"Followed the Waves" is the first single from Auf der Maur's self-titled solo debut. The song peaked in the Top 40 on the chart for Modern Rock Tracks in the United States and also reached the Top 40 in the United Kingdom, only charting two positions lower than the follow-up single, "Real a Lie".

== Background and production ==
"Followed the Waves" was one of the many songs written by Melissa Auf der Maur over a 12-year period from 1992 to 2004. The song was featured as the second track on Auf der Maur, following "Lightning Is My Girl".

== Track listing and formats ==
- UK CD single
1. "Followed the Waves" – 4:48 (Melissa Auf der Maur)
2. "Good News" – 4:21 (Auf der Maur)
- US CD single
1. "Followed the Waves" – 4:48
2. "Good News" – 4:21
3. "My Foggy Notion" (demo version) – 4:13 (Auf der Maur)

** Limited Maxi single editions include an enhanced video of the music video for "Followed the Waves."

- Limited UK 7" vinyl single
1. "Followed the Waves" – 4:48
2. "Good News" – 4:21
- European promo CD
1. "Followed the Waves" (radio edit) – 3:24
2. "Followed the Waves" (album version) – 4:48

== Music video ==
A promotional music for the single was recorded in 2004. The video features Auf der Maur performing "Followed the Waves" and includes many images of a ship sailing through a storm, a theme that would later reoccur on "Follow the Map", a song from her second studio album, Out of Our Minds. Throughout the video, Auf der Maur and her band also perform on an orange backdrop, similar to the album's cover art.

== Chart positions ==
Chart (2004)	Peak position
Modern Rock Tracks	32
United Kingdom	35
US Billboard Hot Single Sales	54

== Personnel ==
=== Musicians and performers ===
- Melissa Auf der Maur – lead vocals, bass, additional guitar
- Steve Durand – lead guitar
- Chris Goss – additional guitar, backing vocals
- Jordon Zadorozny – additional guitar
- Jeordie White – additional guitar
- Brant Bjork – drums
- John Stanier – additional drums
- Nick Oliveri – additional bass, backing vocals
- Kellii Scott – additional drums
- Atom Willard – additional drums

=== Production ===
- Chris Goss – producer, engineer
- Melissa Auf der Maur – additional production
- Martin Schmelzle – engineer
- Matt Mahaffey – engineer, mixer (on "Good News")
- Ben Grosse – mixer
