= Out of Our Minds =

2010 studio album by Melissa Auf der Maur

Studio album by MAdM
- Released: March 30, 2010
- Recorded: 2005–2007; French Kiss Studios, Montreal, Canada; New York and California, United States
- Genre: Alternative rock
- Length: 55:29
- Label: Roadrunner (outside North America)
- Producer: Jordon Zadorozny, Chris Goss, Melissa Auf der Maur

MAdM chronology
Auf der Maur (2004)	Out of Our Minds (2010)

Out Of Our Minds is the second solo album from Melissa Auf der Maur released on March 30, 2010.

Released six years after her self-titled debut, the album was also accompanied by a feature film and comic of the same name. According to reports, the album had been completed since 2007.

== Background and production ==
In a 2007 interview with Billboard magazine, Melissa Auf der Maur confirmed she had completed her second solo album which was "part of a multidisciplinary Viking-themed project that includes a short film and comic book." It was also mentioned that guest musicians, such as Ryan Adams, Vince Nudo and ex-Tinker member Steve Durand, who had also written songs for and played guitar on Auf der Maur, would also appear on the album. Glenn Danzig confirmed on August 18, 2008, that he had recorded a song titled "Father's Grave" with Auf der Maur and claimed it would be included "on a track for her new CD." In the three years it took her to record the album, Auf der Maur also stated that there were "many stops and starts while I was exploring alternative creative outlets." "I was the only one there for the whole five years. I had 12 studios, 25 musicians, and 7 engineers but it wasn't like anyone was with me for the journey", she told Kerrang! in May 2010. Asked about inspirations for the album, she said:

I have endless, diverse inspirations that I pull from. I find that turn-of-the century painters or Egyptian mythology are just as inspiring to me as, say, Mastodon, but I can't say I have any peculiar role models or inspirations for this. I want people to discover this their own way... This is your adventure and you can enjoy it however you want".

A website, xMAdMx.com, containing teasers of the projects, as well as a movie trailer, was launched in August 2007. On November 11, 2008, MAdM released her first EP, "This Would Be Paradise" through her official website, and as well digitally on iTunes. The EP was also released as a 7" vinyl edition, while the download package includes the album art and the three songs, "The Key", "Willing Enabler" and "...This Would Be Paradise." Less than a year later, on November 9, 2009, MAdM released the first single from the album, the title track "Out Of Our Minds" for free digital download on her website. On December 7, 2009, MAdM's second EP, also titled OOOM, was released. The three song EP, which includes "Out Of Our Minds", "Lead Horse" and "22 Below", was released in three different forms. The first was a digital download package which also included the CD and 7" version, the second included the same with an OOOM T-shirt, and the third "deluxe" version included a signed copy of the OOOM comic book. On January 12, 2010, the "Out Of Our Minds" music video was also premiered on her website.

MAdM has confirmed that all demos from the album were recorded on a 4-track with the help of a drum machine. The demos were recorded in northern Ontario with producer, Jordon Zadorozny. In February 2010, MAdM also confirmed that Out Of Our Minds will contain 12 tracks, and noted guest musicians such as "members of NIN, Helmet/Battles and Priestess."

On March 11, 2010, MAdM issued a newsletter confirming that Out Of Our Minds is set for release on March 30. It is also mentioned that "there are various international album releases" but that deluxe versions of the album will be "release[d] on my personal site." On March 28, another newsletter contained details on OOOM's release, and included links to a "secret OOOM page", which includes deluxe versions of the album for purchase, as well as a complete download of the album.

On October 4, 2010, Melissa Auf der Maur premiered her next music video "Meet Me On The Dark Side" online.

== Promotion ==
Professional ratings
Review scores
Source	Rating
AllMusic	3.5/5 stars
Kerrang!	4/5 stars
NME	5/10 stars
Popmatters	6/10 stars
Consequence of Sound	{Favorable}

In efforts to promote the album, MAdM has performed various shows since 2008 and has performed alongside screenings of the OOOM film. Her first performance since 2004 was at Lion d'Or in Montréal on November 1, 2008, in which she debuted songs from Out Of Our Minds as well as confirmed the upcoming album.

More shows were performed in Utrecht and Helsinki the same month. More recently, MAdM has appeared at New York City's Knitting Factory on October 17, 2009. MAdM also performed at SPIN's annual SXSW music festival in March, sharing the stage with Motörhead, and plans to tour Europe and United Kingdom in April, 2010.

The album charted and peaked at #174 in France, #36 in Greece and #52 in Switzerland.

=== Accolades ===
Year-end rankings

Publication	Accolade	Rank
Kerrang!	The 50 Best Albums from 2010s	43

Decade-end rankings

Publication	Accolade	Rank
Kerrang!	The 75 Best Albums of the 2010s	58

== Track listing ==
All tracks are written by Melissa Auf der Maur unless otherwise noted.

No.	Title	Writer(s)	Length
1.	"The Hunt"		3:18
2.	"Out of Our Minds"	Auf der Maur, Jordon Zadorozny, Vince Nudo	4:32
3.	"Isis Speaks"	Auf der Maur, Chris Sorensen, Adam Tymn, Joe McChan	5:57
4.	"Lead Horse"	Auf der Maur, Zadorozny, Nudo	3:48
5.	"Follow the Map"		5:17
6.	"22 Below"	Auf der Maur, Chris Goss	4:15
7.	"Meet Me on the Dark Side"		4:07
8.	"This Would Be Paradise"		2:42
9.	"Father's Grave" (featuring Glenn Danzig)		5:56
10.	"The Key"		3:54
11.	"The One"		3:59
12.	"1000 Years"	Auf der Maur, Steve Durand	7:38
Total length:			55:29

Deluxe CD edition bonus tracks
No.	Title	Writer(s)	Length
13.	"22 Below" (Piano version)	Auf der Maur, Goss	5:17
14.	"Whispers and Potions"		4:33
Total length:			65:09

Japanese CD bonus tracks
No.	Title	Length
13.	"My Body"	4:58
Total length:		60:27

== Personnel ==
All personnel credits adapted from Out of Our Minds' liner notes.

Performers

- Melissa Auf der Maur – vocals (1–3, 5–7, 9–12), bass (1–7, 9–12), guitar (5, 7, 10, 11), keys (3, 5, 7, 8), autoharp (8), omnichord (8), tweaks (1, 7, 8)
- Jordon Zadorozny – guitar (2, 4), additional guitar (9, 11), bass (8), keys (4), ebow (11)
- Steve Durand – guitar (12), additional guitar (7), keys (11)
- Chris Sorensen – guitar (3, 6), keys (6), tweaks (3)
- Chris Goss – guitar (9), additional guitar (11)
- Vince Nudo – drums (2, 4, 11), additional guitar (2)
- Adam Tymn – guitar (3, 6), keys (6)
- Joe McChan – drums (3, 6)
- Josh Freese – drums (7, 9, 10, 11)
- John Stainer – drums (1)
- Colin Robins – drums (5)
- Mike Garson – piano (1, 9)
- Camila Grey – harpsichord (7)
- Mike Britton – trombone (12)

Guest performers

- James Iha – ebow (5)
- Glenn Danzig – vocals (9)
- Jeordie White – additional guitar (10)
- Ariel Engle – additional vocals (12)

Technical personnel

- Melissa Auf der Maur – production
- Jordon Zadorozny – production (2–8, 11, 12, 14, "My Body"), engineering (2–8, 11, 12), mixing (14, "My Body")
- Chris Goss – production (9–11, 13)
- Edmund P. Monsef – engineering (9–11), mixing (1, 4, 5, 8, 10, 12, 13)
- Eli Janney – engineering (1), mixing (9)
- Mike Fraser – mixing (3, 6, 7, 11)
- Alan Moulder – mixing (2)
- Adam Ayan – mastering
- Chris Rakestraw – additional engineering
- George Pelekoudis – additional engineering
- Paul Antonell – additional engineering
- Eli Walker – assistant engineering
- Matt Gunther – assistant engineering
- Rudyard Lee Cullers – assistant engineering

Design personnel

- Vincent Toi – art direction
- Melissa Auf der Maur – creative collaboration
- Phoebe Greenberg – creative collaboration
- Reneta Morales – creative collaboration
- George Fok – creative collaboration, photography

== Chart positions ==
Chart (2010)	Peak position
French SNEP Albums Chart	174
Greek Albums Chart	36
Swiss Hitparade Albums Chart	52
UK Albums Chart	148
