= Auf der Maur (album) =

Studio album by Melissa Auf der Maur
- Released: February 2, 2004
- Recorded: 2001–2003
- Genre: Alternative rock
- Length: 55:11
- Label: Capitol
- Producers: Chris Goss, Melissa Auf der Maur

Melissa Auf der Maur chronology
Auf der Maur (2004)	Out of Our Minds (2010)

Alternative cover

Singles from Auf der Maur
- 1. "Followed the Waves" Released: February 16, 2004; 2. "Real a Lie" Released: May 3, 2004; 3. "Taste You" Released: September 27, 2004

Auf der Maur is the debut studio album by the Canadian alternative rock musician Melissa Auf der Maur, released on February 2, 2004, on Capitol Records. Following her career as a bassist for Hole and The Smashing Pumpkins, Auf der Maur recorded the album over the course of two years in various studios through the United States and Canada with producer Chris Goss. The songs featured on Auf der Maur were written over a ten-year period, from 1992 to 2002, throughout her time in Tinker, Hole and The Smashing Pumpkins.

Auf der Maur features a number of guest musicians and collaborators including former bandmates Eric Erlandson and James Iha, Queens of the Stone Age frontman Josh Homme, Mark Lanegan, Jeordie White and John Stanier. The album's sound deviates significantly from Auf der Maur's previous work and features a more experimental and progressive sound.

Upon its release, Auf der Maur received generally favourable reviews and was a moderate commercial success, selling 200,000 copies worldwide. Following a successful tour through Europe and United Kingdom prior to the album's release, two of the album's three singles—"Followed the Waves" and "Real a Lie"—charted in the UK Singles Chart. A subsequent tour of North America and another tour in the United Kingdom led the album to chart in both the United States' Billboard 200 and the UK Album Chart at number 187 and number 31, respectively.

== Background ==
Following her departure from Hole in November 1999, Melissa Auf der Maur was recruited as the replacement bassist for D'arcy Wretzky in The Smashing Pumpkins in early 2000. Auf der Maur toured with the band for the Sacred and Profane tour in support of Machina/The Machines of God (2000) and appeared in the music videos accompanying its release. In May 2000, The Smashing Pumpkins disbanded and Auf der Maur did not have plans to continue her music career. In an interview with Jam!, Auf der Maur said: "one of the reasons why I took 2001 off is I didn't even know what I was going to do with music. Maybe I was going to play in a cover band the rest of my life" and that her "relationship to music had become very army-oriented. I was a soldier, a hard worker who never got enough satisfaction from the music. I didn't know if I was going to make my own record." In late 2001, Auf der Maur discovered "old demos" in her Montréal residence and "realized [she] had an entire album's worth of material that had been sitting there for years." Among the demos was "Real a Lie", a song written with frequent collaborator Steve Durand, that was released as a single by the duo's former band Tinker in 1994. Auf der Maur said that the decision to record an album "happened very naturally."

== Recording ==
The album was recorded during 2001, 2002 and 2003 at various studios throughout the United States and Canada, including Stagg Street Studios in Los Angeles, Stratosphere Sound in New York City, Rancho De La Luna in Joshua Tree, California, Glenwood Place Studios in Burbank, California, The Sound Factory in Hollywood, Sound City Studios and Kevin Augunas's residence in Van Nuys, California, and French Kiss Studios in Montréal, Canada. Recording sessions began in October 2001 and initially she intended to record in Chicago, Illinois, but those plans were later abandoned. Although each session had individual engineers, Auf der Maur and Chris Goss were primary producers of the project. Auf der Maur also financed the recording sessions herself, as she was not signed to a record label at the time. She also self-financed the sessions to "secure creative control" as she "wanted the foundation of it to be really pure." Describing the recording process, Auf der Maur said: "The L.A. section of the record is the prettier, more ethereal stuff [and] the dark, rock stuff actually –– which is really my main route and the muscle of the record –– was recorded in Canada. And then in Chicago we're recording some songs with James and Chris that are more mid-dissonant pop –– mid-tempo, mid-volume."

Those two sides – the heavy and the feminine put together – is what does it for me. What moves me when I play bass is a guttural, kind of masculine, heavy, Viking thing. I picture fields and galloping horses. And then there's the dream girl in me who writes in a diary and used to sing in a choir. But I would never want one without the other. Life is good and evil, man and woman. And I want to embrace both.

Upon the completion of the recording sessions, Auf der Maur's budget ran out. She did not have funds to mix the album but was signed to Capitol Records soon afterwards.

Various musicians collaborated during the recording of Auf der Maur. Former bandmates Eric Erlandson and James Iha performed guitar on "Would If I Could" and "Skin Receiver", respectively, Mark Lanegan provided additional vocals to "Taste You", and Queens of the Stone Age frontman Josh Homme played guitar on four songs and backing vocals on "Skin Receiver". Speaking of the contributions, Auf der Maur said: "I am so lucky I have all these talented friends. It is not too hard to find musicians who are available to play. It just so happens the most generous people are also the best and were willing to play." During the earlier stages of recording, a duet with Rufus Wainwright was also considered.

== Release ==
Auf der Maur was released worldwide on February 2, 2004, May 4 in the United States and June 1 in Canada. Although the album was distributed internationally on Capitol, EMI managed distribution of the album in Canada. For initial promotion upon its American release, Auf der Maur appeared on Late Night with Conan O'Brien on June 17 and The Tonight Show with Jay Leno on July 6.

Three singles from the album were lifted. The lead single, "Followed the Waves", was released on February 16, 2004, to accompany the worldwide release. It charted in both the Billboard Modern Rock Tracks in the United States and the UK Singles Chart, peaking at number 32 and number 35, respectively. "Real a Lie" was released on May 3 to accompany the American release of the album, however, the song only charted in the United Kingdom, peaking at number 33. The album's final single, "Taste You", was released on September 27 and peaked at number 51 in the United Kingdom. All three singles had accompanying music videos which were made available for download on Auf der Maur's official web site in Windows Media Video, QuickTime and RealVideo formats.

=== Tour ===
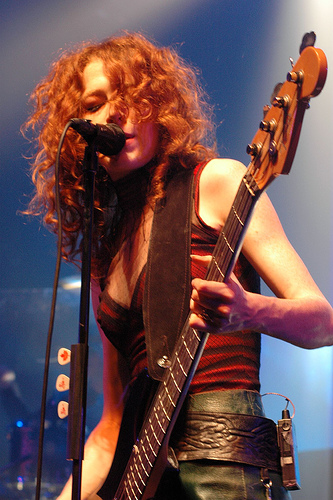
Melissa Auf der Maur performing on-stage in France during her 2004 tour.

Auf der Maur promoted the album with an almost-constant tour across Europe, the United Kingdom and North America during 2004. The seven-leg tour commenced on January 30, 2004, and concluded on December 4. The 151-date tour included support from A Perfect Circle, Mínus, The Living Things, The Offspring, The Polyphonic Spree, The Von Bondies, Matthew Good and H.I.M. amongst others. During the tour, Auf der Maur performed at various summer festivals including Curiosa in the United States, Pukkelpop in Belgium, Lowlands Festival in the Netherlands, Reading Festival, Leeds Festival in the United Kingdom, and Independents Day Festival in Italy. During the entire tour, Auf der Maur published photography from the shows on her official web site.

Following the tour, Capitol Records was taken over by EMI. All of the material that had been recorded for Auf der Maur, including outtakes, demos and rehearsal recordings, were seized by EMI's red tape. Following months of negotiations, Auf der Maur won the rights to the recordings and was subsequently dropped from Capitol/EMI in 2006. Reflecting on the experience, Auf der Maur said there is "a gross feeling when you merge your heart with a corporate structure." Auf der Maur took the experience into consideration when considering labels to release Auf der Maur's follow-up, Out of Our Minds (2010), which was self-released.

== Reception ==
Auf der Maur entered the US Billboard Heatseekers chart at number 8 and remained there for two weeks and also peaked at number 187 on the Billboard 200. As of 2006, the album had sold 35,000 copies in the United States, according to Nielsen SoundScan. The album sold an additional 165,000 copies worldwide, bringing the total sales to 200,000.

Professional ratings
Aggregate scores
Source	Rating
Metacritic	(62/100)
Review scores
Source	Rating
Allmusic	3/5 stars
Alternative Press	4/5 stars
The A.V. Club	(3/10)
BBC	positive
Blender	3/5 stars
Drowned in Sound	(7/10)
Entertainment Weekly	C+
The Guardian	3/5 stars
NME	8/10 stars
Q	4/5 stars

Auf der Maur was generally well received by music critics. At Metacritic, which assigns a normalised rating out of 100 to reviews from mainstream critics, the album received an average score of 62, based on 19 reviews, indicating "generally favorable reviews". Allmusic reviewer Stephen Thomas Erlewine awarded the album three out of five stars, noting that the album had "a certain nostalgic appeal" and was "a little slicker and more polished" than her previous work but added that the album's themes were a "little embarrassing and juvenile." Alternative Press awarded the album four out of five stars, adding that "the disc's bread and butter is Auf Der Maur's smoking riffs." Keith Phipps of The A.V. Club said that "though Auf Der Maur is never objectionably bad, there's nothing the least bit distinctive about it" and called it "Billy Corgan-inspired, arena-scale, guitar-driven introspective musery" in his three out of ten review. In his review for the BBC, Matt Wicks described the album as "excellent" and "like the Pumpkins in their prime" and compared Auf der Maur to other female contemporaries such as Shirley Manson and PJ Harvey. Blender gave a majorly positive review, awarding the album three out of five stars, but criticized Auf der Maur's vocals, stating: "buffeted by big guitars, her thin, untrained voice occasionally sounds listless."

Tom Edwards of Drowned in Sound noted that the "opening trio of tracks are the most convincing" and the album "still has all the hallmarks of the debut record [...] it has the great songs that have been collected over years in the bedroom and on the road" in his seven out of ten review. Entertainment Weekly gave the album a C+ grade with reviewer David Browne describing the album as "professional, commercial alt-rock that takes flight intermittently,” but adding that “the monolithic sound [...] feels dated and drab" and surmising that Auf der Maur was "the perfect CD for 1995, released too late." Adam Sweeting of The Guardian described the album's songs as "powerful and finely crafted" and "soared", though adding that some were "multi-layered", and awarded the album three out of five stars. NME awarded the album eight out of ten and said that " the mix of stingingly personal lyrics" and "bruisingly heavy music just draws you in even further, while the crunchy production is so massive, so physical, the music fills every in of space it comes into contact with" and Q referred to the album as "a revelation", awarding it four out of five stars.

== Track listing ==
All tracks are written by Melissa Auf der Maur, unless noted otherwise.

No.	Title	Writer(s)	Length
1.	"Lightning Is My Girl"		4:09
2.	"Followed the Waves"		4:48
3.	"Real a Lie"	Auf der Maur, Steve Durand	4:22
4.	"Head Unbound"		3:58
5.	"Taste You"		4:39
6.	"Beast of Honor"		3:27
7.	"I'll Be Anything You Want"	Auf der Maur, Josh Homme	2:57
8.	"My Foggy Notion"		4:48
9.	"Would If I Could"		3:40
10.	"Overpower Thee"	Chris Goss, Josh Homme	2:35
11.	"Skin Receiver"	Steve Durand	3:35
12.	"I Need I Want I Will^{[A]}"	Auf der Maur, Josh Homme	7:32
Total length:			50:30

US and Canadian bonus track

No.	Title	Length
13.	"Taste You" (French version, titled as "Te Goûter")	4:40
Total length:		55:11

Japan bonus track

No.	Title	Length
13.	"Good News"	4:20
Total length:		54:51

- A "I Need I Want I Will" contains a hidden track of Auf der Maur's grandmother singing at 6:28 followed by a longer version of "Taste You" at 7:35 with some verses sung in French.

== Personnel ==
All personnel credits adapted from the album's liner notes.

Musicians

- Melissa Auf der Maur – vocals, bass, guitar, keyboard
- Brant Bjork – drums (2, 8)
- Steve Durand – guitar (1, 3, 5, 6, 7, 11), backing vocals (11)
- Eric Erlandson – guitar (9)
- Chris Goss – guitar (2, 7, 11), backing vocals (4, 12), piano (10)
- Josh Homme – guitar (2, 7, 8, 12), drums (12), backing vocals (11, 12)
- James Iha – ebow (4), guitar (11), backing vocals (11)
- Mark Lanegan – backing vocals (5)
- Ana Lenchantin – strings (8)
- Paz Lenchantin – strings (8)
- Nick Oliveri – bass (7, 11, 12), backing vocals (11)
- Kellii Scott – drums (6)
- John Stanier – drums (1, 3, 7, 11)
- Jeordie White – guitar (1)
- Atom Willard – drums (4, 9)
- Fernando Vela – strings (8)
- Jordon Zadorozny – guitar (2, 3, 6, 7, 8, 9), drums (5)

Technical personnel

- Melissa Auf der Maur – producer
- Chris Goss – producer
- Martin Schmelzle – engineer (at Stagg Street Studios, Rancho De La Luna and Glenwood Place Studios)
- Ben Mumphrey – assistant engineer (at Stagg Street Studios)
- Howard Willing – additional engineer (at Stagg Street Studios and Sound Factory)
- Ele Janney – engineer (at Stratosphere Sound)
- Rudyard Lee Cullers – assistant engineer (at Stratosphere Sound)
- Kevin Augunas – engineer (at Augunas residence)
- Greg Koller – engineer (at Augunas residence)
- Jordon Zadorozny – engineer (at French Kiss Studio)
- Joe Barresi – engineer (at Sound City)
- Ben Grosse – mixing
- Eddy Schreyer – mastering

Design personnel

- Eric Roinestad – art direction
- Phil Poynter – photography
- Yelena Yemchuk – additional photography
- Melissa Auf der Maur – additional photography

== Chart positions ==
Chart (2004)	Peak position
Austrian Top 40	50
Belgian Albums Chart (Vl)	38
Belgian Albums Chart (Wa)	74
Dutch Top 40	54
French SNEP Albums Chart	47
German Albums Chart	32
Scottish Albums (Official Charts)	29
Swedish Albums Chart	59
Swiss Hitparade Chart	54
UK Albums Chart	31
US Billboard 200	187
US Billboard Heatseekers	8

=== Singles ===
Year	Single	Peak positions	
Year	Single	US	UK
2004	"Followed the Waves"	32	35
2004	"Real a Lie"	—	33
2004	"Taste You"	—	51
"—" denotes a release that did not chart.
