= Melissa Auf der Maur =

Canadian musician (born 1972)

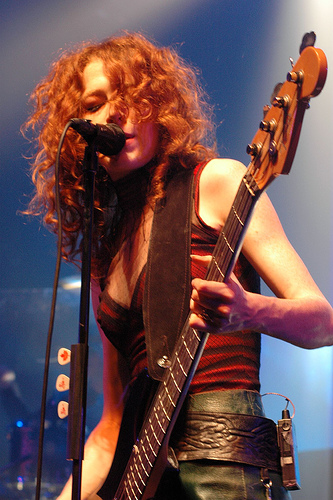
- Auf der Maur

Background information
- Born: March 17, 1972 (age 54); Montreal, Quebec, Canada
- Genre: Alternative rock
- Occupations: Musician, singer, songwriter, photographer, actress
- Instruments: Vocals, bass, guitar
- Years active: 1993–present
- Labels: Capitol, PHI–MAdM
- Formerly of: Tinker, Hole, Constant Comment, The Smashing Pumpkins, Team Sleep, The Chelsea, Hand of Doom
- Website: xmadmx.com
- Parents: Nick Auf der Maur (father); Linda Gaboriau (mother)

Melissa Gaboriau Auf der Maur (/ˌɔːf dər ˈmaʊər/; born March 17, 1972) is a Canadian musician.

Auf der Maur began performing in 1993 after forming the indie rock band Tinker while she was a student at Concordia University. She was recruited as the bassist for the American alternative rock band Hole in the summer of 1994 and is included on several Hole releases, including the album Celebrity Skin (1998). Following her departure from Hole in 1999, Auf der Maur briefly joined The Smashing Pumpkins as a touring member for their 2000 tour and began her solo career; her debut studio album Auf der Maur was released in 2004 on Capitol Records and Out of Our Minds, her second studio album, was released in 2010 on her own independent record label, PHI–MAdM Music. She has also collaborated with Indochine, Rufus Wainwright, Ric Ocasek, and Neverending White Lights.

Auf der Maur is also a photographer and occasional actress. Her photographs have been included in National Geographic and exhibited at Sotheby's. She acted in How to Make the Cruelest Month (1998), Beyond Borders (2003), and Collaborator (2011). As part of her 2009 multidisciplinary project Out of Our Minds—which produced an album, a single, a film and a comic book—Auf der Maur acted as a film and record producer, working alongside her husband, filmmaker Tony Stone. Stone and Auf der Maur are the creative directors and owners of Basilica Hudson, an arts and performance center in Hudson, New York.

VH1 placed Auf der Maur at number 68 on its list of 100 Greatest Women of Rock & Roll in 2007 and her solo albums have received favorable reviews.

== Early life ==
Auf der Maur was born in Montreal, Quebec, to journalist and politician Nick Auf der Maur and journalist and literary translator Linda Gaboriau. Auf der Maur's father's family was Swiss-German and her mother's was mixed European-American. Gaboriau was born in Boston, Massachusetts, in the United States. As a result, she holds dual Canadian–American citizenship. Auf der Maur's surname translates to English as "on the wall", as "maur" is German for "wall" (die Mauer). She has stated that her grandmother, Theresia Schaelin-Auf der Maur, was "always pounding my heritage down my throat—reminding me that I'm the last one in North America to further the name".

Auf der Maur did not meet her father until she was three years old. Gaboriau called Nick Auf der Maur after her daughter began questioning her about her father's identity. Reflecting on the encounter, Auf der Maur said "[my father] realised my mother Linda was the love of his life because she'd offered the gift of this child without any demands. He fell madly in love with her [and] pursued her for two years". Nick Auf der Maur and Gaboriau married in 1978 when Melissa was six years old. The couple divorced in 1979 after which Auf der Maur traveled worldwide with her mother. A portion of Auf der Maur's childhood was spent living in "a circus caravan in Wales, a red post-office box truck in Morocco, and a hut in Kenya" with her mother. During her time in Kenya, she contracted three bouts of malaria and returned to Montreal.

In Montreal, Auf der Maur attended the Fine Arts Core Education (FACE) School and Moving in New Directions (MIND) High School—both of which are schools of alternative education. At FACE, she was a member of the classical choir and at MIND, she was "part of the small English elite", where she formed friendships with Leonard Cohen's daughter Lorca and Rufus Wainwright. At school, she became interested in photography and subsequently attended Concordia University, where she majored in photography in 1994. At Concordia at age 19, Auf der Maur began working part-time as a DJ at Bifteck, a well-known rock club, where she met several musicians including Steve Durand.

== Music career ==
=== 1993–1994: Tinker ===
During her time as a DJ at Bifteck, Auf der Maur met fellow Concordia University student Steve Durand, with whom she formed Tinker in November 1993. Durand assumed guitar duties and Auf der Maur began playing bass, using a Fender Precision Bass that her father had purchased for her 21st birthday. The duo recruited a second guitarist, Jordon Zadorozny, and a drummer and began performing at Montreal venues.

At a Smashing Pumpkins performance at Les Foufounes Électriques on July 23, 1991, Auf der Maur became friends with vocalist and guitarist Billy Corgan. During the performance, Auf der Maur's roommate heckled the band between songs and threw a beer bottle onstage while the band was performing, leading to "a strangling fist fight" between him and Corgan. Auf der Maur explained:

My friend Bruce [Cawdron], who later became the drummer in Godspeed You! Black Emperor, was there and he whispered, 'God, this guy has attitude. They're acting like they're playing an arena. And he then threw a bottle at Billy and shouted, 'Drop the fucking attitude!' Bill dived off the stage, put his hands around Bruce's neck, and they started fighting. I thought, 'Great. You just ruined the show.' I went up to Billy afterwards and said, 'I'd like to apologise on behalf of Montreal. You are my new favourite band.'

Auf der Maur and Corgan became pen pals. Following months of no contact, Auf der Maur sent a letter to Corgan requesting that Tinker open for The Smashing Pumpkins during their next tour date in Montreal. Corgan accepted her request and Tinker performed the largest show of their career, to 2,500 people, opening for The Smashing Pumpkins at Métropolis on November 30, 1993. Corgan, Auf der Maur recalled, "patted me on the back. He said, 'You're a really good bass player. You're going to be in my band one day.' It felt like a dream come true – exactly the kind of confidence boost I needed."

Tinker released two 7-inch singles, "Realalie" and "Green Machine", on the independent record label Bear Records in 1994. The group continued to release music until 1996. In summer 1994, Auf der Maur accepted Courtney Love's invitation to become the bassist for the alternative rock band Hole, a job she initially declined:

Billy called me and said, 'I'm coming through town on [1994's] Lollapalooza next week. But the great news is, you're going to join my friend Courtney's band.' And that's when it all started ... Within a week, I had every friend calling me saying, 'Are you crazy?' My father said, 'What do you mean? The big Pumpkin guy offered you a real job in music and you said no?' By that time, Courtney got my phone number and said, 'What do you mean, you don't want to join my band? You're getting on a plane to Seattle tomorrow.' And I did. She and Patty came to pick me up at the airport, and she was very funny, very sweet. And she was very good to me from day one. Very welcoming. She had all these lesbian nannies and assistants. There was a really cool, tight clan of mothering, care-taking lesbians. Everyone was very nice.'

=== 1994–1999: Hole ===
In summer 1994, Hole was in need of a new bassist after the death of Kristen Pfaff. Of her original decision to decline Love's offer to join, Auf der Maur recollected: "I said no because it seemed like a very sad scenario to be going into ... it just seemed like a very sad place", citing Pfaff's death as a "red flag" and a reason to not join the band. Upon meeting Love and drummer Patty Schemel, Auf der Maur said she got "a flash of destiny in her eyes" and accepted the offer. She completed her Bachelor of Fine Arts (B.F.A.) at Concordia and was recruited as the bassist for Hole two weeks prior to its performance at the 1994 Reading Festival. "Lou Barlow and Evan Dando were watching from the side of the stage," she recalled. "I probably didn't even move. I just thought, 'As long as I get these parts right, it'll be just fine.'"

From 1994 to 1995, Auf der Maur toured worldwide with Hole in support of its second studio album, Live Through This (1994). On the tour, Auf der Maur was described by guitarist Eric Erlandson as "bringing sunshine to the band" during the "dark and grey" atmosphere of the tour, which was problematic due to the band's recent bereavements—notably the death of Pfaff and Love's husband Kurt Cobain—as well as Love's drug addiction. Auf der Maur befriended Patty Schemel and rented a house with her following the two-year-long tour. The duo began a side project, Constant Comment, and released a split 7-inch single with Red Aunts on Sympathy for the Record Industry featuring the song "Firecrasher". Auf der Maur has since said the friendship and musical compatibility between her and Schemel were based on a "redhead connection"; Schemel has referred to Auf der Maur as her "anchor" during the period following the death of Pfaff and Cobain.

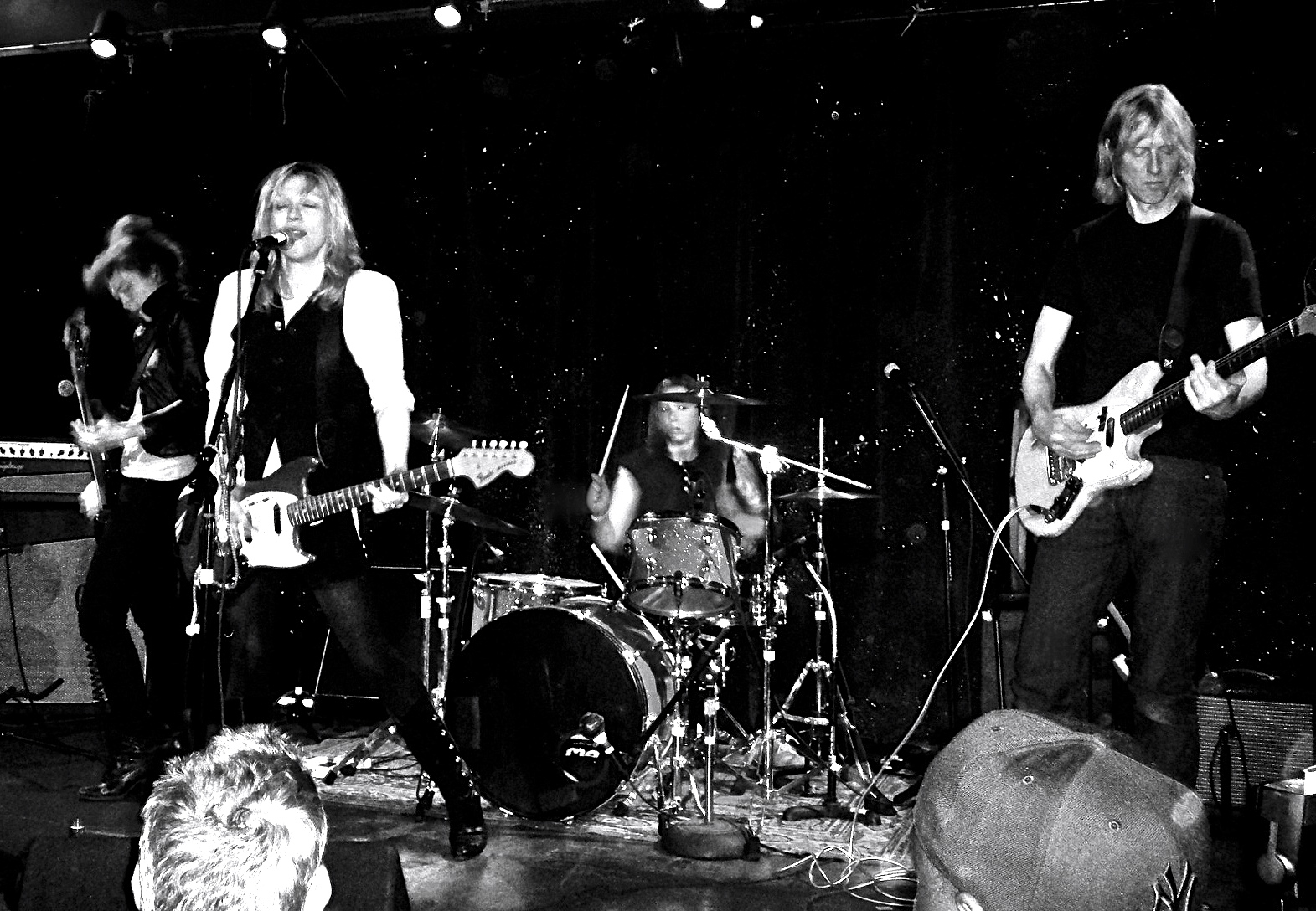
Auf der Maur (left) performing at Hole's one-off reunion at Public Assembly in Brooklyn, New York, in April 2012

Auf der Maur was featured on various Hole releases, including the 1996 non-album single "Gold Dust Woman" and on various live tracks on My Body, the Hand Grenade (1997). She was featured on the band's third studio album, Celebrity Skin (1998), performing bass and co-composing five of the 12 songs. Celebrity Skin was a major critical and commercial success; it charted at number 9 in the U.S. Billboard 200 albums chart and number 3 in the Canadian Albums Chart, as well as its lead single and title track peaking at number 1 on the Billboard Modern Rock Tracks chart. It has since been certified platinum in both the U.S. and Canada. Following the tour in support of its release, Auf der Maur left Hole in October 1999 as her five-year contract with the band ended and she wished "to grow in many different directions".

In June 2009, NME reported that Hole was reforming. Love claimed that Auf der Maur was rejoining as bassist to record on her upcoming album Nobody's Daughter—which was being rebranded as a Hole album—and performing on the supporting tour. Auf der Maur stated that she was "surprised and disappointed" by the announcement and had no intention of partaking in the reformed band. Despite several legal issues, Nobody's Daughter was released as Hole's fourth studio album in April 2010 with Shawn Dailey replacing Auf der Maur as bassist.

Hole reunited again—with the Celebrity Skin line-up of Love, Erlandson, Auf der Maur and Schemel—for a one-off performance at Public Assembly in Brooklyn, New York on April 12, 2012 at an after-party for Schemel's film Hit So Hard (2011). Originally Auf der Maur, Erlandson and Schemel were performing as a trio until Love arrived for a spontaneous performance of "Miss World" and "Over the Edge". The Quietus reported in April 2014 that the four members had reunited although in subsequent interviews, Love downplayed talk of an imminent reunion. In April 2016, Auf der Maur stated in an interview that she no longer had time or energy for a full-fledged reunion, but would be interested in wrapping up the Hole legacy with a retrospective disc and small set of tour dates.

=== 1999–2000: The Smashing Pumpkins ===
Original Smashing Pumpkins bassist D'arcy Wretzky left the band in September 1999 during the recording of the band's fifth studio album, Machina/The Machines of God (2000). In October 1999, Auf der Maur was recruited as her replacement by Billy Corgan, with whom she was still friends from her time in Tinker and Hole. "Courtney knew I was leaving to make my solo project," she explained. "But then, coincidentally, the week that I left Hole was the week D'arcy left the Pumpkins. So, within a week, Billy called me and said, 'The stars have aligned: it's time for you to join my band.' I had to do it."

Auf der Maur was featured on neither Machina/The Machines of God nor Machina II/The Friends & Enemies of Modern Music (2000) as Wretzky's remaining bass duties were assumed by Corgan during recording sessions, but she played with the Pumpkins during the Machina tour from December 1999 to December 2000. The tour covered North America, Japan, Europe and South Africa and was described by Auf der Maur as "very ambitious". Reflecting on the tour, she said: "they would always be changing arrangements and keys of songs. The work ethic of the Pumpkins is so full-on and so demanding ... joining [the band] was just intense work, much more about work than about emotional experience". She performed at various shows, including the band's final television performance on The Tonight Show with Jay Leno and the band's final show at the Cabaret Metro in Chicago on December 2, 2000, as well as appearing in the band's music videos. Smashing Pumpkins broke up at the end of the year 2000.

In February 2006, MTV reported that Corgan and drummer Jimmy Chamberlin had signed a new management deal with Azoff Management, with a spokesperson confirming they had signed under The Smashing Pumpkins moniker. In response, Auf der Maur said in a separate interview that "as long as Billy has Jimmy, he can make the essential Pumpkins record, I'm sure" and when asked of her involvement said she was not planning on participating in the reunion but noted that her "services are always there to play [her] favorite songs. If D'arcy is not available, I'm always happy to be second in line". Despite her earlier interest and Wretzky's absence, The Globe and Mail reported in April 2007 that Auf der Maur confirmed she would not be rejoining The Smashing Pumpkins. Auf der Maur joined Billy Corgan on stage in Montreal on June 13, 2025 for a performance of "The Everlasting Gaze", as well as on October 9, 2026 for a performance of “Zero” at the Bell Centre.

=== 2002–2003: The Chelsea and Hand of Doom ===
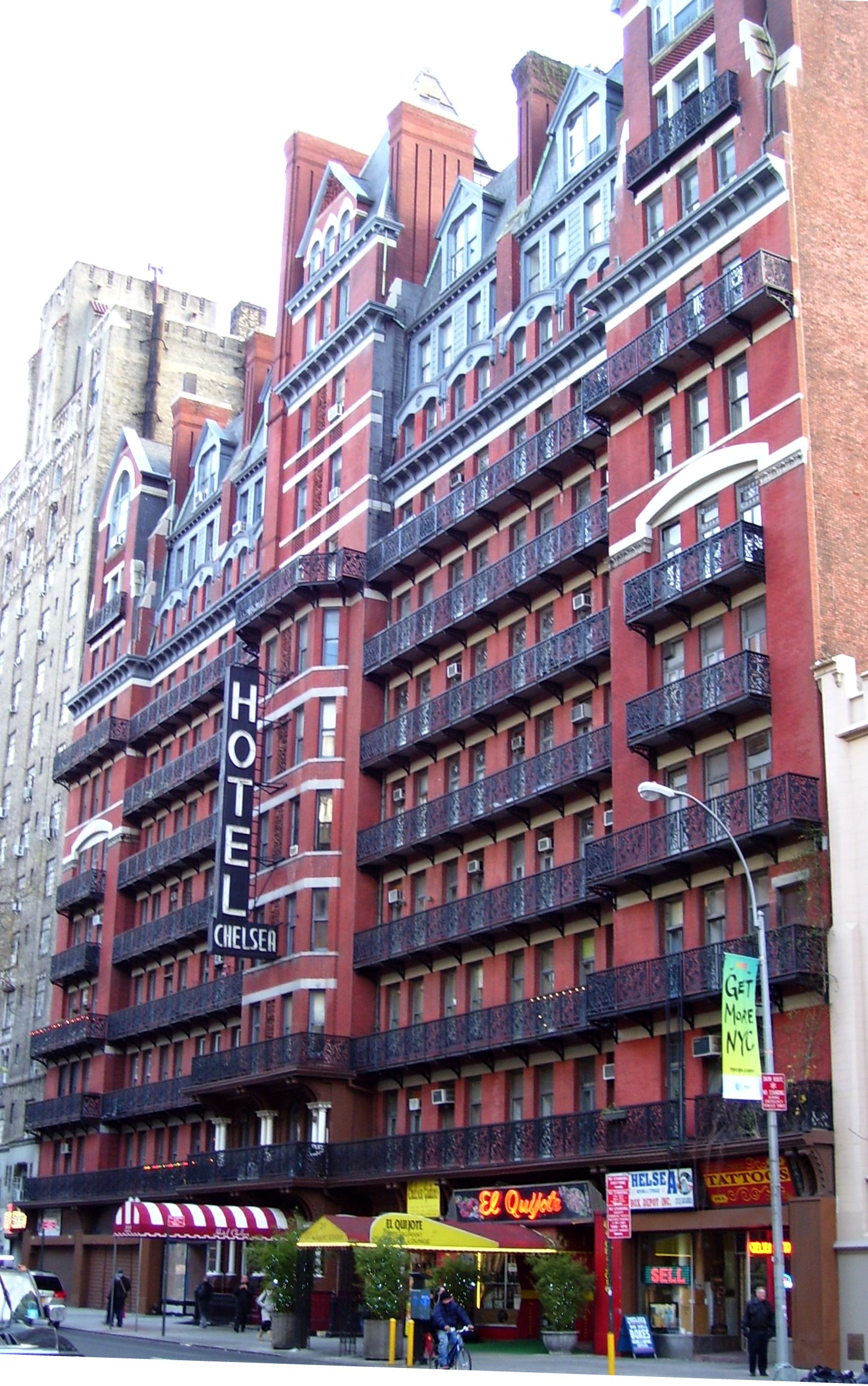
Auf der Maur's brief project The Chelsea was named after the Hotel Chelsea in New York

In 2002, Auf der Maur formed a brief project with former Hole drummer Samantha Maloney, Peaches, Paz Lenchantin and Radio Sloan. Adopting the title The Chelsea—named after the Chelsea Hotel in New York where Auf der Maur had lived for a number of years—the band performed one show at Spaceland in Los Angeles, California in February that included original songs and cover versions. Featuring a cover version of Devo's "Gates of Steel" and early renditions of songs Auf der Maur would feature on her debut studio album, the show was poorly received due to its "seeming lack of preparation" and "was little more than pleasantly mopey and blurry garage rock" according to a Variety review. Courtney Love subsequently named her backing band The Chelsea, also hiring Maloney and Sloan in the process, while touring for her debut studio album, America's Sweetheart (2004).

Later the same year, Auf der Maur formed Hand of Doom, a Black Sabbath cover band in which she performed lead vocals. The band included bassist Molly Stern, drummer Pedro Yanowitz, turntablist Joey Garfield and guitarist Guy Stevens. In March, the band began performing a select number of shows at established venues in Los Angeles including the Whisky a Go Go, The Troubadour and The Viper Room, and released a live album, Live in Los Angeles (2002), consisting of recordings from various performances. The album received warm reviews, with AllMusic writer Bradley Torreano describing it as a "fun, groovy, and strangely sensual" record that "finds the soul behind all the years of posturing", adding that "it is Auf der Maur herself who is the very key to the album". Dubbing itself as "art-karaoke", Hand of Doom performed further dates in North America during summer 2002 before disbanding in 2003.

=== 2004–2010: Solo career ===
Returning to Montreal in 2001 after the disbandment of The Smashing Pumpkins, Auf der Maur was unsure about whether or not to continue her music career. In an interview with Jam!, she said that her "relationship to music had become very army-oriented. I was a soldier, a hard worker who never got enough satisfaction from the music. I didn't know if I was going to make my own record". In late 2001, upon discovering old demo recordings in her home, Auf der Maur decided to pursue a solo career after she had "realized [she] had an entire album's worth of material that had been sitting there for years".

Recorded from 2001 to 2003 at various studios in the U.S. and Canada, Auf der Maur's debut studio album Auf der Maur was released in February 2004 on Capitol Records. Produced with Chris Goss, Auf der Maur financed the recording sessions herself as she was not signed to a record label at the time of recording and during post-production, her budget ran out and she was unable to mix the album. She accepted a recording contract from Capitol soon afterwards and released Auf der Maur to "generally favorable reviews", according to Metacritic. The album's supporting singles—"Followed the Waves", "Real a Lie" and "Taste You"—were moderate successes in the United Kingdom, charting in the Top 40 of the UK Single Charts. As of 2010, the album had sold 200,000 copies worldwide.

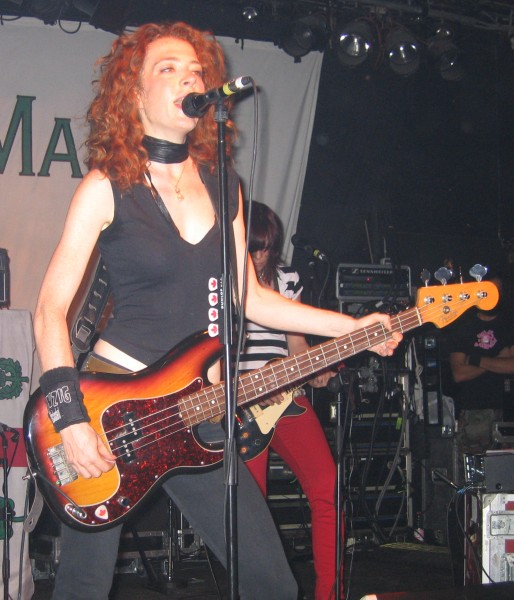
Auf der Maur in 2004

In a 2007 interview with Billboard, Auf der Maur announced that she had finished recording her second studio album which would be released as part of a multidisciplinary project including a concept film, an album, and a graphic novel to be released in fall 2009. An official website containing teasers of the project, as well as a film trailer, was launched in August 2007 and featured a regular blog updated by Auf der Maur documenting the various stages of the project. Following disputes with Capitol and getting "caught up in some red tape" that delayed the release of the project, Auf der Maur left the label to secure creative control and release her music on "[her] own terms".

An EP titled ... This Would Be Paradise was released in November 2008 as a 7-inch and digital download on iTunes. The three-track EP was released on Urbanited Music, an independent record label based in the Netherlands and was released under Auf der Maur's abbreviated name MAdM, which she used for all succeeding releases. A short six-date tour of Canada and northern Europe followed the release of the EP, which featured her first live performances since the 151-date tour in support of Auf der Maur in 2004 and 2005.

In late 2009, Auf der Maur released a single, "Out of Our Minds", and an EP, OOOM. The single was issued as a free download on her official website; both the single and the EP were self-released on PHI–MAdM Music Inc., her own record label, a division of the Montreal-based PHI Centre Group. Auf der Maur also signed an international distribution deal with Roadrunner Records, who issued the releases outside of North America. Her second studio album, also titled Out of Our Minds, was released in March 2010 as part of the OOOM project. Despite charting in France, Greece, Spain and the UK, the album received mixed reviews. However, in January 2011 Out of Our Minds won the Best Indie/Alternative/Hard Rock Album at the Independent Music Awards. In autumn 2011, Auf der Maur went on maternity leave.

=== Other collaborations ===
Auf der Maur briefly toured with former The Cars frontman Ric Ocasek in 1997, after contributing bass and background vocals to his 1997 solo album Troublizing. She collaborated with French group Indochine on their song "Le Grand Secret", singing a duet in French with Nicola Sirkis. Auf der Maur joined the band on stage to perform the song on various occasions and appeared in the music video for the song. She performed a rare, short, acoustic set of some of her solo songs during an Indochine show in Paris, February 22, 2002. Auf der Maur has contributed bass and backing vocals to childhood friend Rufus Wainwright's album Poses and appears in his 1998 video for "April Fools". In 2008, she collaborated with Canadian musician Daniel Victor on his music collaboration project Neverending White Lights. They recorded the song "The World is Darker", for which a video was released in March 2008. Aside from this, she has contributed to albums by artists such as Ryan Adams, Ben Lee, Idaho, The Stills and Fountains of Wayne.

In 2007, Auf der Maur appeared on the Fountains of Wayne album Traffic and Weather singing backing on the track "Someone to Love".

== Photography ==
Auf der Maur was a photography major specializing in self-portraiture at Concordia University when she was invited to join Hole in 1994. Her photos have been published in Nylon, Bust, Mastermind, National Geographic, American Photo, and Creem, among other magazines. Her photos were also in the exhibition The Kids are Alright at Sotheby's in New York City along with photos by Yelena Yemchuk.

She put together a solo exhibition in 2001, under the name of Channels, mostly featuring shots of Auf der Maur's life on the road, with a recurring TV theme and shots of hotel TV screens, hence the name Channels. The exhibition opened September 9, 2001, at Brooklyn's Secret Gallery, but was shut down after the September 11 attacks. It was shown again at O Patro Vys, Montreal, in May 2006.

An exhibition of her photographs of the ‘90s is scheduled for September 2026 at the Art Gallery of Ontario.

== The Greatest Canadian advocate ==
In 2004, the Canadian Broadcasting Corporation produced a television series called The Greatest Canadian which saw 100 Canadian figures nominated for the title of "the Greatest Canadian". The list of 100 was narrowed to a group of 10 finalists and a program dedicated to relating the story of, and case for, each nominee was aired on the network. Each nominee was promoted by a Canadian celebrity advocate and Auf der Maur appeared as the advocate for environmentalist David Suzuki, who finished fifth.

== Other ventures ==
In 2010, she co-founded Basilica Hudson with her husband, independent filmmaker Tony Stone, a historical landmark in Hudson, New York converted to an arts and performance venue.

In March 2026 Auf der Maur published a memoir, Even the Good Girls Will Cry.

== Personal life ==
Auf der Maur married Tony Stone in 2006. They have one daughter, born in October 2011. The couple own Basilica Hudson, an arts and performance center in Hudson, New York, where they live.

She also had a relationship with Dave Grohl between 1999 and 2001.

== Discography ==
- Auf der Maur (2004)
- Out of Our Minds (2010)
