= Jordon Zadorozny =

Canadian rock musician and producer (born c. 1973)

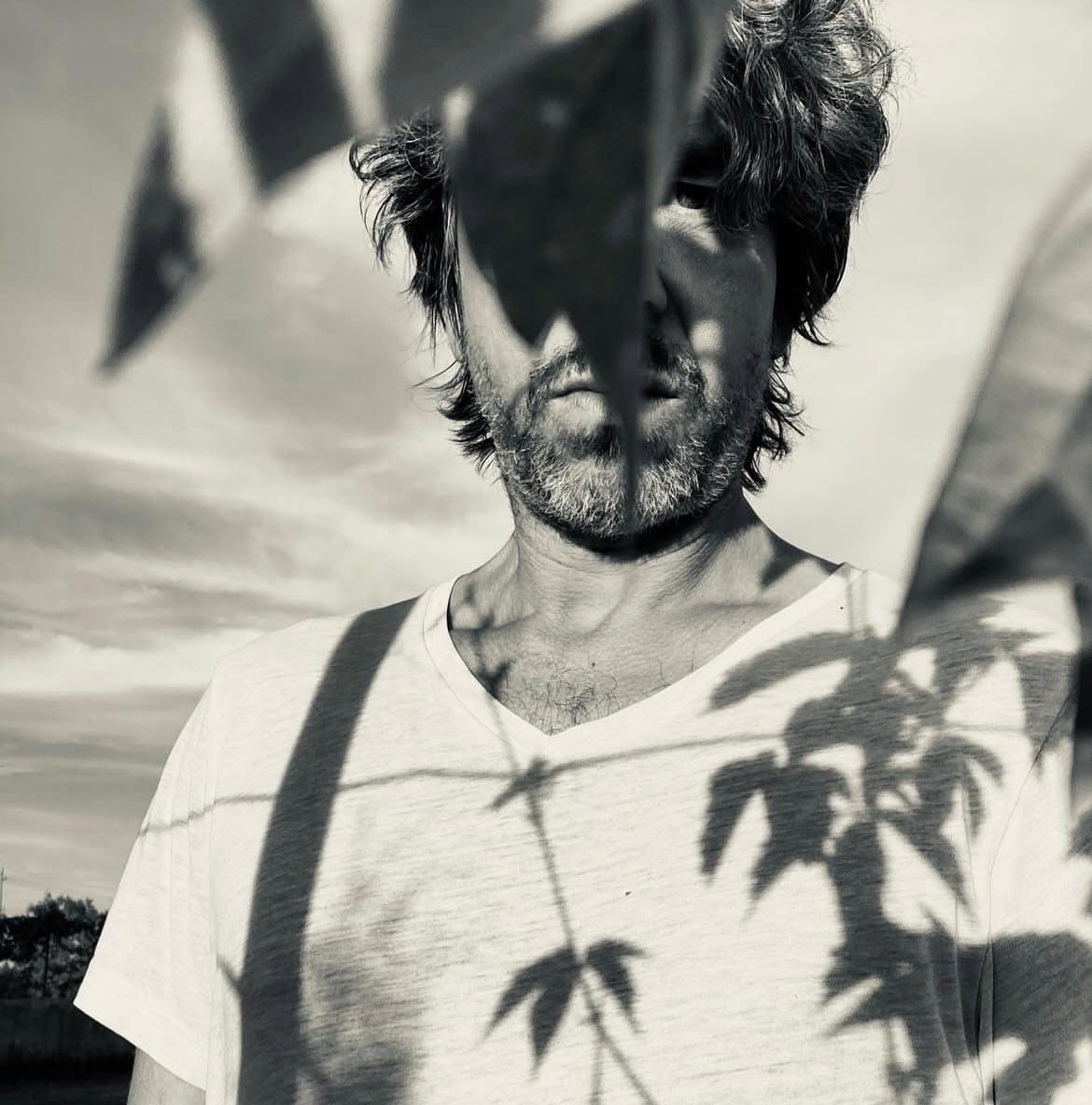
- Zadorozny in 2026

Background information
- Born: 1973 (age 52–53); Pembroke, Ontario
- Years active: 1993–present
- Member of: Blinker the Star Tinker; Abbey; SheLoom; The Angry Moon; The Lily Bias; Digital Noise Academy Velorum

Jordon Zadorozny (born c.1973 in Pembroke, Ontario) is a Canadian rock musician and producer. He is the singer and songwriter for indie rock band Blinker the Star. He is best known for cowriting songs with Courtney Love in the late 1990s. Zadorozny has also appeared on recordings by Melissa Auf der Maur, Sam Roberts, Tara Slone, and Mandy Moore. He has produced a number of bands in the Ontario area as well as bands in the United States and beyond.

In 2009, Jordon helped Chris Cornell with production and engineering on his third solo album, Scream. He was also involved in the complete re-recording of Chris' song Never Far Away which was intended to be the foundation for a full rock version of the Scream album. Jordon was also a member of Canadian indie band Abbey with Sofia Silva from 2004 to 2008 as well as Digital Noise Academy with several musicians including Ken Andrews in 2013. He has since reformed Blinker the Star, released several albums since 2012's "We Draw Lines" and continues to record and produce at his studio Skylark Park.

In 2025, Jordon joined Velorum, a North American alternative rock collective blending thick, layered guitars with lush, expansive vocal harmonies, drawing influence from the crushing weight of Torche and Hum, and the melodic sensibilities of The Beatles, The Beach Boys, and Crosby, Stills & Nash. The band features Seth Beckham (guitar, bass, keys), lyricist Geoff Calhoun; Jordon Zadorozny (lead vocals), Kellii Scott(drums), Chris Enriquez (drums), and Michael Dulin (backing vocals).

== Discography ==
- Blinker The Star (1995) Treat and Release Records
- A Bourgeois Kitten (1996) A&M Records
- August Everywhere (1999) DreamWorks Records
- Still In Rome (2003) French Kiss Records
- We Draw Lines (2012) Nile River Records, rereleased on Needlejuice Records in 2026
- Songs From Laniakea Beach (2013)
- 11235 (2015)
- 8 Of Hearts (2017)
- Careful With Your Magic (2019)
- Juvenile Universe (2020)
- Love Oblast (2022)
- Animal Math (2023)
- Occult Classic (2024)

All records from We Draw Lines onwards released on Nile River Records

== See also ==
- Music of Canada
- Canadian rock
- List of Canadian musicians
