= Patrick Wolf discography =

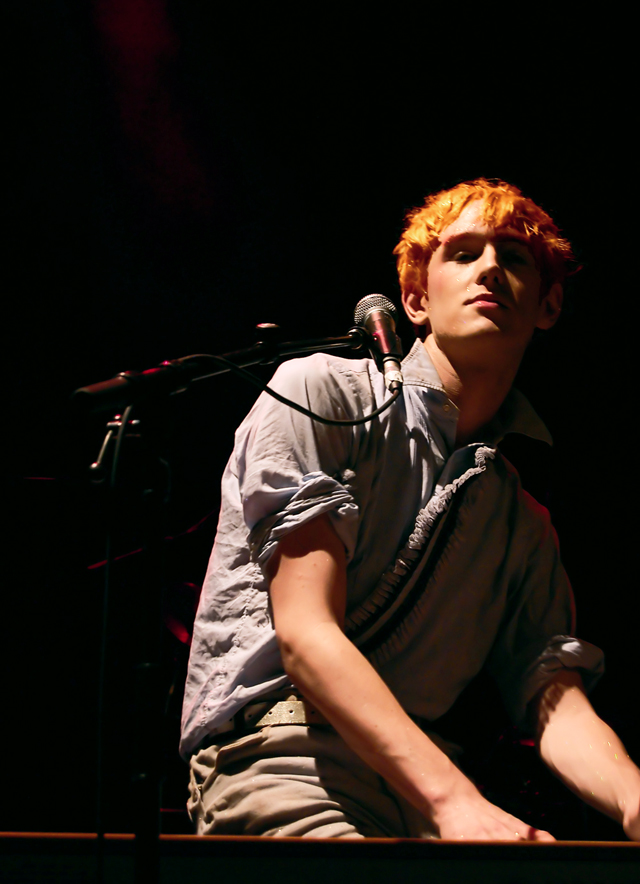
- Patrick Wolf performing in Montreal
- Studio albums: 7
- Extended plays: 5
- Singles: 13
- Music videos: 15

The discography of English singer-songwriter Patrick Wolf contains seven studio albums, twelve singles and four extended plays.

== Studio albums ==
Title	Album details	Peak chart positions		
Title	Album details	UK	AUT	US Heat.
Lycanthropy	Released: 28 July 2003; Label: Tomlab; Formats: CD, digital download, LP	—	—	—
Wind in the Wires	Released: 2 February 2005; Label: Tomlab; Formats: CD, digital download, LP	—	—	—
The Magic Position	Released: 26 February 2007; Label: Loog; Formats: CD, digital download, LP	46	—	—
The Bachelor	Released: 1 June 2009; Label: Bloody Chamber Music; Formats: CD, digital download, LP	49	—	—
Lupercalia	Released: 20 June 2011; Label: Mercury; Formats: CD, digital download, LP	37	47	—
Sundark and Riverlight	Released: 15 October 2012; Label: Bloody Chamber Music; Formats: CD, digital download, LP	—	—	—
Crying the Neck	Released: 25 April 2025; Label: Apport, Virgin Music; Formats: CD digital download, LP	—	—	—
"—" denotes album that did not chart or was not released

== Extended plays ==
Title	EP details
The Patrick Wolf EP	Released: 11 November 2002; Label: Faith and Industry
The Spinster EP	Released: 1 June 2009; Label: Bloody Chamber Music
Lemuralia EP	Released: 20 June 2011; Label: Hideout
Brumalia EP	Released: 4 December 2011; Label: Mercury
The Night Safari EP	Released: 14 April 2023; Label: Apport

== Singles ==
Single	Year	Peak	Album
Single	Year	UK	Album
"The Libertine"	2005	67	Wind in the Wires
"Wind in the Wires"	2005	123	Wind in the Wires
"Tristan"	2005	129	Wind in the Wires
"Accident & Emergency"	2006	79	The Magic Position
"Bluebells"	2007	—	The Magic Position
"The Magic Position"	2007	69	The Magic Position
"Vulture"	2009	—	The Bachelor
"Hard Times"	2009	—	The Bachelor
"Damaris"	2009	—	The Bachelor
"Time of My Life"	2010	—	Lupercalia
"The City"	2011	195	Lupercalia
"House"	2011	—	Lupercalia
"Together"	2011	—	Lupercalia
"—" denotes singles that did not chart

== Music videos ==
Year	Title	Director
2003	"To the Lighthouse"	Ingrid Z
2005	"The Libertine"	Pil and Galia Kollectiv
2005	"Wind in the Wires"	
2005	"Tristan"	Paul Gore
2006	"Accident & Emergency"	Maria Mochnacz
2007	"Bluebells"	Jaron Albertin
2007	"The Magic Position"	Jaron Albertin
2009	"Vulture"	Patrick Wolf
2009	"Hard Times"	Ace Norton
2009	"Damaris"	Patrick Wolf
2011	"The City"	Kinga Burza
2011	"Time of My Life"	Patrick Wolf/William Pollock
2011	"House"	Andy Bruntel
2011	"The Falcons"	Norioko Okaku
2011	"Together"	Mattias Johannson

== Other appearances ==
- Covered Kate Bush's Army Dreamers for Buffetlibre's Amnesty project
- "Army of Me" (Army of Klaus remix) on Army of Me: Remixes and Covers, album of remixes and covers of the song "Army of Me" by Björk
- Collaborated with Bishi for her album Nights at the Circus
- The track "Careless Talk" from the soundtrack to the film The Edge of Love
- Guest vocals on "On Sussex Downs" by Larrikin Love
- "This Joke Sport Severed" (Patrick Wolf's Love Letter to Richey Remix) on Journal for Plague Lovers Remix album by Manic Street Preachers
- Covered The Beach Boys' "I Just Wasn't Made for These Times".
