= Night Safari =

Night Safari may refer to:

- Night Safari, Singapore, a nocturnal zoo in Singapore
- Chiang Mai Night Safari, a zoo in Thailand
- The Night Safari, an EP by English singer-songwriter Patrick Wolf
