= Sundark and Riverlight =

Studio album by Patrick Wolf
- Released: 15 October 2012
- Studio: Real World Studios
- Genre: Acoustic
- Length: 63:17
- Label: Bloody Chamber Music/Essential Music
- Producer: Patrick Wolf

Patrick Wolf chronology
| Brumalia EP (2011) | Sundark and Riverlight (2012) | The Night Safari (2023) |

Professional ratings
Review scores
| Source | Rating |
|---|---|
| Drowned in Sound | 8/10 |
| Sputnikmusic | 4.0/5 |

Sundark and Riverlight (stylised "Sun☽ark and Riverlight") is a double album released by English singer-songwriter Patrick Wolf on 15 October 2012. It was released through his own label, Bloody Chamber Music, and Essential Music.

== Background ==
The double album marks ten years since Wolf's debut studio album, Lycanthropy and contains re-recorded, acoustic versions of select songs from the previous ten years. The first disc, Sundark, features "more solitary darker material" and "songs that were written in loneliness and not really thinking about other people", while the second disc, Riverlight, includes "songs of hope and relationship" and "isolation and solitude on one and togetherness". Buffy Sainte-Marie co-wrote the new version of "Hard Times" after they met in Barcelona during the recording session.

Wolf wrote a letter to talk about the album. In the letter, he says, "I thought It was time after a decade to take a moment to document what these songs have grown up to be while I've been travelling them around the world." "There was a conscious rebellion on this album against the digital age of auto-tune and mass produced electronic landfill music. I want to present at my 10-year anniversary a musical biography." He cites Stephan Micus, Shirley and Dolly Collins's Love, Death and the Lady as influences to the album. The album is also dedicated to Wolf's Russian fans.

The album was recorded at Peter Gabriel's Real World Studios. Gabriel also lent his Bösendorfer grand piano, Bodhrán and Hammered dulcimer to Wolf.

The title of the album is taken from the song "London", from Lycanthropy, which begins "Sun dark on darker streets, it's violent times for weary feet..." and ends with "Forget me, I wash myself in your grey river light".

== Album artwork ==
The album artwork was shot at Hilles House in Gloucester, a country mansion looking over the River Severn, the former home of baroque composer John Blow and fashion designer Isabella Blow with the art directed by David Motta. The cover shows the singer in front of a tapestry of Primavera by Italian renaissance painter Sandro Botticelli.

== Singles ==
The version of "Overture", originally from the album The Magic Position, was released on YouTube in late August. It then became available on iTunes as a single on 7 September. Radio edits of "Bermondsey Street" and "The Libertine" were subsequently released to radio stations on 17 December 2012 and 8 April 2013 respectively.

== Track listing ==
Disc 1: Sundark
| No. | Title | Original album | Length |
|---|---|---|---|
| 1. | "Wind in the Wires" | Wind in the Wires | 3:54 |
| 2. | "Oblivion" | The Bachelor | 2:52 |
| 3. | "The Libertine" | Wind in the Wires | 4:20 |
| 4. | "Vulture" | The Bachelor | 4:48 |
| 5. | "Hard Times" | The Bachelor | 3:17 |
| 6. | "Bitten" | Brumalia EP | 3:20 |
| 7. | "Overture" | The Magic Position | 4:08 |
| 8. | "Paris" | Lycanthropy | 4:31 |

Disc 2: Riverlight
| No. | Title | Original album | Length |
|---|---|---|---|
| 1. | "Together" | Lupercalia | 4:59 |
| 2. | "The Magic Position" | The Magic Position | 3:52 |
| 3. | "Bermondsey Street" | Lupercalia | 5:01 |
| 4. | "Bluebells" | The Magic Position | 3:44 |
| 5. | "Teignmouth" | Wind in the Wires | 4:09 |
| 6. | "London" | Lycanthropy | 3:52 |
| 7. | "House" | Lupercalia | 3:18 |
| 8. | "Wolf Song" | Lycanthropy | 3:01 |
