= 10th Anniversary Acoustic World Tour =

2012–13 concert tour by Patrick Wolf

- Tour by Patrick Wolf
- Promotional poster for the tour
- Location: Europe; Oceania; North America
- Associated album: Sundark and Riverlight
- Start date: 29 August 2012
- End date: 14 September 2013
- Legs: 4
- No. of shows: 77

Patrick Wolf concert chronology
- Lupercalia Tour (2011); 10th Anniversary Acoustic World Tour (2012–13)

The 10th Anniversary Acoustic World Tour was a 2012–13 worldwide concert tour by English singer-songwriter Patrick Wolf.

== Background ==
The tour was launched in 2012 to celebrate Wolf's 10th anniversary in the music industry. Wolf took the stage playing grand piano, Celtic harp, dulcimer and more. He was accompanied by one other musician on stage and had promised to play an entirely different set list on each night of the tour. The tour continued in 2013.

== Support acts ==
- Woodpigeon
- Mice Parade
- Abi Wade
- Rachel Sermanni

== Setlist ==
1. "Ghost Song"
2. "Hard Times"
3. "Teignmouth"
4. "Penzance"
5. "Overture"
6. "Paris"
7. "Together"
8. "Time of My Life"
9. "The Libertine"
10. "London"
11. "The Sun Is Often Out"
12. "Bitten"
13. "Bermondsey Street"
14. "Wind in the Wires"
15. "House"
16. "The Magic Position"
  Encore
17. "Vulture"
18. "The City"
19. "Pigeon Song"

== Tour dates ==
Date	City	Country	Venue
Europe
August 29, 2012	London	England	The Old Vic
Oceania
September 7, 2012	Fortitude Valley	Australia	The Tivoli
September 8, 2012	Sydney	Australia	The Studio, Sydney Opera House
September 9, 2012	Sydney	Australia	The Studio, Sydney Opera House
September 11, 2012	Melbourne	Australia	Forum Theatre
North America
September 18, 2012	Philadelphia	United States	World Cafe Live
September 20, 2012	New York City	United States	Joe's Pub
September 21, 2012	New York City	United States	Joe's Pub
September 22, 2012	Boston	United States	Royale
September 23, 2012	Montreal	Canada	L'astral
September 25, 2012	Toronto	Canada	The Music Gallery
September 28, 2012	Seattle	United States	The Triple Door
September 29, 2012	Vancouver	Canada	Rio Theatre
September 30, 2012	Portland	United States	Aladdin Theater
October 2, 2012	San Francisco	United States	Great American Music Hall
October 4, 2012	Los Angeles	United States	Bootleg Theater
October 5, 2012	Los Angeles	United States	Culture Collide Festival
Europe
October 14, 2012	Hamburg	Germany	Kampnagel
October 15, 2012	Frankfurt	Germany	Künstlerhaus Mousonturm
October 16, 2012	Munich	Germany	Freiheizhalle
October 18, 2012	Berlin	Germany	Passionkirche
October 19, 2012	Cologne	Germany	Kulturkirche
October 21, 2012	Basel	Switzerland	Kaserne Basel
October 24, 2012	Rome	Italy	Teatro Ambra Jovinelli
October 25, 2012	Ravenna	Italy	Almagià
October 26, 2012	Mestre	Italy	Teatro Corso
October 29, 2012	Rotterdam	Netherlands	Rotown
October 30, 2012	Amsterdam	Netherlands	De Duif
October 31, 2012	Brussels	Belgium	Ab Theatre
November 2, 2012	Reykjavík	Iceland	Iceland Airwaves
November 6, 2012	Salford	England	The Lowry
November 7, 2012	Cardiff	Wales	The Gate Arts Centre
November 10, 2012	Bordeaux	France	Le Krakatoa
November 12, 2012	Lille	France	Église Saint Andre
November 13, 2012	Paris	France	Café De La Danse
November 14, 2012	Strasbourg	France	La Laiterie
November 20, 2012	Gateshead	England	The Sage Gateshead
November 21, 2012	Liverpool	England	The Gallery Liverpool
November 24, 2012	Coventry	England	Warwick Arts Centre
November 25, 2012	Glasgow	Scotland	Cottiers
December 5, 2012^{[A]}	London	England	Rough Trade East
December 9, 2012	Penzance	England	The Ritz
December 10, 2012	Bristol	England	St George's
December 11, 2012	Brighton	England	St Mary the Virgin Church
January 24, 2013	Aveiro	Portugal	Teatro Aveirense
January 25, 2013	Vila Nova de Famalicão	Portugal	Casa das Artes
January 27, 2013	Barcelona	Spain	Sala Apolo
January 29, 2013	Madrid	Spain	Teatro Lara
February 4, 2013	Oxford	England	St John the Evangelist Church
February 6, 2013	Norwich	England	Norwich Arts Centre
February 7, 2013	Liverpool	England	Epstein Theatre
February 8, 2013	Edinburgh	Scotland	Pleasance Theatre
February 9, 2013	Wolverhampton	England	Wulfrun Hall
February 13, 2013	Southampton	England	Turner Sims Concert Hall
February 15, 2013	Gothenburg	Sweden	Hagakyrkan
February 17, 2013	Stockholm	Sweden	Södra Teatern
February 18, 2013	Oslo	Norway	Kulturkirken Jakob
February 20, 2013	Saint Petersburg	Russia	Kolizey Hall
February 21, 2013	Moscow	Russia	Dk Zueva
February 22, 2013	Helsinki	Finland	Savoy-teatteri
February 23, 2013	Riga	Latvia	Palladium Riga
February 25, 2013	Vienna	Austria	Stadtsaal
February 26, 2013	Linz	Austria	Posthof
February 27, 2013	Budapest	Hungary	Trafó
February 28, 2013	Prague	Czech Republic	Palác Akropolis
March 2, 2013	Warsaw	Poland	Palladium
March 22, 2013	Belfast	Northern Ireland	Mc Hughs Basement Bar
March 23, 2013	Dublin	Ireland	The Sugar Club
March 24, 2013	Clonakilty	Ireland	DeBarra's Folk Club
April 6, 2013	London	England	Queen Elizabeth Hall
May 18, 2013	Leipzig	Germany	Wave-Gotik-Treffen
June 13, 2013	Eindhoven	Netherlands	Naked Song Festival
July 19, 2013	Steventon	England	Truck Festival
July 26, 2013	Lucerne	Switzerland	Blue Balls Festival
July 27, 2013	Feldkirch	Austria	Poolbar Festival
August 2, 2013	Katowice	Poland	Off Festival
September 14, 2013	Koktebel	Ukraine	Koktebel Jazz Festival

Other miscellaneous performances
^{A} This concert was short acoustic set and signing event.

Cancellations and rescheduled shows
Date	Location	Venue	Reason/additional info
14 September 2012	Perth, Australia	Fly By Night	
26 January 2013	San Sebastián, Spain	DonostiKluba	
