= The Magic Position (song) =

Single by Patrick Wolf

from the album The Magic Position
- Released: 26 March 2007
- Genre: Folktronica, indie pop
- Length: 3:53
- Label: Loog Records
- Songwriter(s): Patrick Wolf

Patrick Wolf singles chronology
"Bluebells" (2007)	"The Magic Position" (2007)	"Vulture" (2009)

Alternative cover
- Cover of the 7" CD1 single.

"The Magic Position" is the third single from Patrick Wolf's third album, The Magic Position. It was released on 26 March 2007.

The song is now available free with version 5.24 of Winamp as part of the download bundle. It is also featured on the soundtrack to the 2007 film Run, Fat Boy, Run. This song was #64 on Rolling Stone's list of the 100 Best Songs of 2007. Pitchfork Media placed the song at #427 on its "Top 500 Tracks of the 2000s" list. The song was also featured prominently twice during the film Were the World Mine, during a scene and then again as the closing credits theme. The song was also featured in Burberry's Autumn/Winter 2014 campaign.

== Track listings ==
=== CD single ===
1. "The Magic Position"
2. "The Marriage"

=== 7" vinyl single (CD1) ===
1. "The Magic Position"
2. "Augustin/Secret Garden II"

=== 7" vinyl single (CD2) ===
1. "The Magic Position"
2. "Luna & Libertine" (Live)

=== Digital single ===
1. "The Magic Position"
2. "On Sussex Downs"

== Charts ==
Year	Chart	Position
2007	UK Singles Top 75	69
