= The Freedom Spark =

Studio album by Larrikin Love
- Released: 25 September 2006
- Recorded: 2006
- Genre: Indie rock
- Length: 33:42
- Label: Infectious Records
- Producer: Iain Gore

Professional ratings
Review scores
Source	Rating
AllMusic	3.5/5 stars
Drowned in Sound	8/10 stars
Gigwise	4/5 stars
The Guardian	2/5 stars
NME	8/10 stars
Virgin Media	4/5 stars

The Freedom Spark is the sole album by Larrikin Love. It was released on 25 September 2006.

== Track listing ==
1. "The Spark"
2. "Six Queens"
3. "Edwould"
4. "Downing Street Kindling"
5. "Happy as Annie"
6. "Meet Me by the Getaway Car"
7. "At the Feet of Ré"
8. "Well, Love Does Furnish a Life"
9. "On Sussex Downs"
10. "Forever Untitled"
11. "A Burning Coast"

The track "It Explodes" is hidden in the pregap before the first listed track. Some releases omit the song "Forever Untitled".

=== iTunes bonus tracks ===
1. "Is It December?"
2. "A Little Peace in My Heart"
3. "Six Queens (Live from London Calling, Amsterdam)"

== Personnel ==
Larrikin Love

- Edward Leeson
- Micko Larkin
- Alfie Ambrose
- Cathal Kerrigan

Guest musicians

- Robb Skipper – tracks 2, 3, 5, 7 & 10
- Patrick Wolf – tracks 7 & 9
- Jamie T – track 8
- Lauren Doss – co-lead vocals on track 8
- Airhammer – track 1
- Mark Rudland – tracks 6 & 11
- Henry Clark – tracks 6 & 11
- Tom Gorbutt – tracks 6 & 11
- Ollie Cox – track 11
- Alex Cox – track 11
- Anna "Ma" Larkin – track 10
- Jonny Epstein – tracks 10 & 11
- Dan Parry – the Knife
- Jonnie Fielding – track 7
- Iain Gore – glass smashing
- Gavin Scrubby – track 11

Additional personnel

- Iain Gore – producer (all tracks), mixer (tracks 3 & 7)
- Daniel Parry – Assistant Engineer (all tracks)
- Tom Joyce – Assistant Engineer (tracks 8 & 11)
- Cenzo Townsend – mixer (tracks 2, 4, 5, 6, 8, 9, 10 & 11)
- Deidre O'Callaghan – back/front cover photography
- Tom Beard – inlay photography
