= Crying the Neck (album) =

Studio album by Patrick Wolf
- Released: 13 June 2025
- Genres: Baroque pop; indie pop
- Length: 52:19
- Labels: Apport; Virgin Music
- Producers: Patrick Wolf; Brendan Cox

Patrick Wolf chronology
The Night Safari (2023)	Crying the Neck (2025)

Singles from Crying the Neck
- 1. "Dies Irae" Released: 3 February 2025; 2. "Limbo" Released: 18 March 2025; 3. "Hymn of the Haar" Released: 15 April 2025; 4. "Jupiter" Released: 12 May 2025; 5. "The Last of England" Released: 10 June 2025; 6. "Better or Worse" Released: 22 August 2025

Crying the Neck is the seventh studio album by English singer-songwriter Patrick Wolf, released on 13 June 2025 by Apport and distributed by Virgin Music. It marks Wolf's first full-length release of new music since Lupercalia in 2011. The album is the first in a series of four planned albums following the pagan Wheel of the Year.

To support the album, Wolf embarked on a European tour entitled Stations of the Sun, which is also the name of a book by renowned British historian Ronald Hutton that focuses on the British ritual year.

== Background and recording ==
Patrick Wolf released the extended play The Night Safari in 2023, ending a decade-long hiatus from music following the 2012 release of the double album Sundark and Riverlight, which he regarded as a swan song to his career. Wolf struggled with a number of issues in the following years, including addiction, bankruptcy, recuperating from a hit and run, and the death of his mother from cancer. During this time he moved from London to Ramsgate in Kent, finding solace in a quiet and peaceful life, and became inspired by the landscape and folklore of his new surroundings. In writing for the record, Wolf drew parallels between his grief over his mother, strained interpersonal relationships, and the decay of rural English identity. The process of creating the album is partially explored in the 2026 documentary Wolf. The title of the album originates from a harvest festival tradition called "Crying the Neck", once common in the counties of Devon and Cornwall in the United Kingdom, in which a farm worker holds aloft the final handful of cut corn and a series of calls are chanted.

Wolf announced the record on 3 February 2025, along with the lead single, "Dies Irae". He released one single a month in the lead-up to the release, including "Limbo", "Hymn of the Haar", "Jupiter" and "The Last of England".

As with much of his previous work, Crying the Neck was entirely written, arranged and produced by Wolf himself, incorporating instruments such as the viola, Appalachian dulcimer, baritone ukulele, kantale and Atari computer. The album features guest appearances from Zola Jesus, Serafina Steer, and Polar Bear's Seb Rochford. Wolf's sister Jo Apps also contributed last-minute backing vocals towards "Dies Irae", which the siblings found cathartic as a way to "share a last dance in the kitchen with our ma together." Additional production, engineering and mixing was handled by Brendan Cox at Tileyard Studios in London, with whom Wolf had previously worked on The Night Safari.

== Music and composition ==
The six-minute long opening track, "Reculver", is named after a Kentish coastal village, and spans multiple genres and time signatures, progressing from a piano ballad into a barn dance before ending with a coda of "programmed synthesiser chugs". Wolf began writing the track when he was 16, originally basing it off the character of Eustacia Vye from the Thomas Hardy novel The Return of the Native, but came to view it as "a kind of biopic" that "takes the piss out of the victimhood I slipped into in the last 10 years.” "Limbo" is the only track on the record that is focused on a romantic relationship, telling the story of a purgatorial road trip in which a couple is fighting, and takes some of its inspiration from the painting The Scapegoat by William Holman Hunt. "The Last of England" is a tribute to director Derek Jarman, which Wolf called “a National Anthem that I wrote for myself”.

Wolf released the first single from the album, "Dies Irae", on 4 February 2025. The title is inspired by the Latin Requiem Mass, and the song imagines Wolf and his family celebrating one last day with his mother before her death. Wolf called it "An affirmation of life in the last days of knowing you are about to lose someone you love, and a courageous – almost rebellious – choice against the misery to use the time remaining to deepen your love or joy with each other. I finished the lyrics as an imaginary last conversation with my mother in her art studio and out to the garden as the evening falls,” he told Luke Turner of The Quietus.

"Hymn of the Haar" is inspired by the landscapes, plants and animals of the Kent coast and the White Cliffs of Dover. It recounts Wolf's experience of discovering the washed-up body of a drowned migrant, who he initially thought was asleep. The song concludes with the opening line of the early Anglo-Saxon poem The Wanderer, which translates to "Often the solitary one finds mercy".

== Critical reception ==
Professional ratings
Aggregate scores
Source	Rating
Metacritic	81/100
Review scores
Source	Rating
Clash	7/10
The Line of Best Fit	7/10
MusicOMH	4/5 stars

Crying the Neck received positive reviews from music critics. On the review aggregator Metacritic, Crying the Neck received a weighted average score of 81 out of 100 based on 7 critics, indicating "universal acclaim". Writing for The Quietus, which named it "Album of the Week", Robert Davidson described the record as "a cathartic, erudite, and complex work that serves as the beginning of a new chapter for Wolf." John Murphy of musicOMH wrote that it was "a record of catharsis, in effect... steeped in the lore and mystique of his home in East Kent." Attila Peter of The Line of Best Fit found the album to be consistent with Wolf's previous work, retaining elements such as "genre eclecticism, collaborations, literary lyrics, and vulnerability paired with a theatrical air", but opined that the "overblown" production tended to overwhelm "subtle, delicate" moments.

== Track listing ==
All tracks are written by Patrick Wolf.

No.	Title	Length
1.	"Reculver"	6:01
2.	"Limbo" (featuring Zola Jesus)	4:21
3.	"The Last of England"	4:09
4.	"Jupiter"	5:17
5.	"On Your Side"	2:28
6.	"Oozlum"	4:58
7.	"Dies Irae"	3:35
8.	"The Curfew Bell"	5:18
9.	"Lughnasa" (featuring Serafina Steer)	3:03
10.	"Song of the Scythe"	1:27
11.	"Better or Worse"	3:19
12.	"Hymn of the Haar"	4:35
13.	"Foreland"	3:42
Total length:		52:19

== Charts ==
Chart performance for Crying the Neck
Chart (2025)	Peak position
Scottish Albums (Official Charts)	29
UK Album Downloads (Official Charts)	35
UK Independent Albums (Official Charts)	6
