= Tristan (song) =

Single by Patrick Wolf

from the album Wind in the Wires
- Released: 31 October 2005
- Genre: Indie rock, folktronica
- Length: 2:36
- Label: Tomlab
- Songwriter(s): Patrick Wolf
- Producer(s): Patrick Wolf

Patrick Wolf singles chronology
""Wind in the Wires""	"Tristan"	""Accident & Emergency""

"Tristan" is the third, and final, single from English singer-songwriter Patrick Wolf's second full-length album Wind in the Wires, the single was released on CD and limited 1000 vinyl.

Based on Tristram of Lyonesse, Patrick described the writing process in a 2005 interview:

"I took a holiday down to Cornwall in October, which down there is almost mid-autumn; it's very stormy and so you get this huge shipwrecking kind of weather down there. There was no-one around, no tourists. It was my first night there and I had taken down my organ to finish off some lyrics. Then I went for a long walk and suddenly a storm [arrived] in this very dangerous place. I came back safe and sound and dried myself off and suddenly this song 'Tristan' came rapping on the door. It came in two minutes. It was finished then and it was almost like a possession, like I was possessed for two minutes. And I wrote that song. I didn't really know what happened and then suddenly had this gift. It's like someone came to the door and jumped inside me, wrote a song and then ran away again."

In 2008, British singer-songwriter & producer Dev Hynes, using the name Lightspeed Champion, recorded a cover of the song which was released as a bonus track from his single, "Tell Me What It's Worth".

== Track listing ==
=== CD-single ===
1. "Tristan" – 2:36
2. "The Hazelwood" – 4:03
3. ”Idumea” – 2:45

=== 7" vinyl single ===
1. "Tristan (Album Version)" – 2:36
2. "Idumea" – 2:45

== Charts ==
Year	Chart	Position
2007	UK Singles Top 250	129
