= Wolf (2026 film) =

- Directed by: Christian Cargill
- Written by: Christian Cargill
- Produced by: Christian Cargill; Lucy Draper
- Starring: Patrick Wolf
- Cinematography: Christian Cargill
- Edited by: Kevin Corry
- Music by: Owen Pallett
- Production company: ANIM
- Release date: June 11, 2026 (Sheffield)
- Running time: 88 minutes
- Country: UK
- Language: English

Wolf is a 2026 British documentary film directed by Christian Cargill. The film centres on the upbringing and art of Patrick Wolf, with narration provided by Tilda Swinton. It premiered at Sheffield DocFest on 11 June 2026.

== Synopsis ==
The film traces Patrick Wolf's journey from his teenage outcast years due to being queer to his rise as a pop artist, to his struggles with substance abuse that left him unable to make music for 13 years. It combines archival footage, animation, and scenes from Wolf's present-day life to explore how someone rebuilds their identity after facing hardship. Tilda Swinton, who previously collaborated with Wolf on his 2009 album The Bachelor and whose film Orlando had a transformative effect on him, provides conversational narration. It culminates in Wolf creating music again for a new album, Crying the Neck (2025).

== Release ==
Wolf had its world premiere at the Sheffield DocFest. on 11 June 2026.

It had its international premiere on 10 October 2026 at the Vancouver International Film Festival.

== Reception ==
Neil Baker praised it, describing it as "profoundly moving" and "candid and contemplative".
