= Bishi Bhattacharya =

British singer

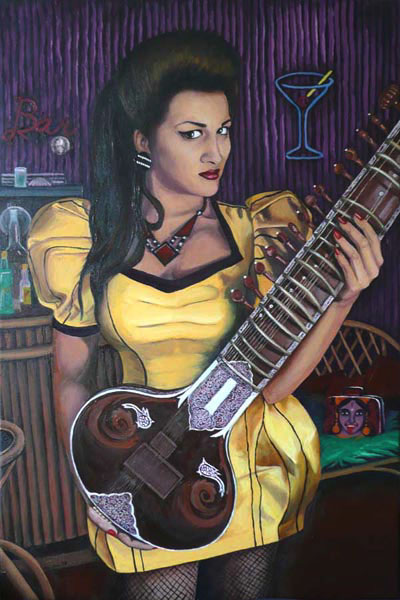
Bishi by Ella Guru, 2008

Bishi Bhattacharya, typically known mononymously as Bishi, is a British, London-based, singer-songwriter, multi-instrumentalist, multimedia performer, producer, composer and DJ of Bengali heritage. She is the artistic director and co-founder of WITCiH, The Women in Technology Creative Industries Hub, a platform to increase the visibility of women at the intersection of music, creative technology and STEM. Bishi was first recognised in 2001 as the central DJ and 'face' of London's experimental underground nightclub, Kash Point.

== History ==
Born in London to a Bengali family, musician, artist and performer Bishi was classically trained in piano and received voice training in both Hindustani and Western Classical styles. Her mother, Susmita Bhattacharya, is an acclaimed classical Indian singer and expert in the music of Rabindranath Tagore.

Bishi received training in the sitar under Gaurav Mazumdar, a senior disciple of Ravi Shankar. Bishi's panoramic exploration of vocal music has reached as far as singing with The London Bulgarian Choir and drawing on ancient English folk music to exploring the extended techniques of Meredith Monk.

Bishi began her musical career in The Sound Storm – an improvised electro-acoustic performance art troupe led by London night club legend Matthew Glamorre and his longtime collaborator Richard Torry; two of the original members of Leigh Bowery's performance art band, Minty. Whilst in her teens, she helped initiate various cult queer London nightclubs such as classical music soirée The Siren Suite and Kash Point, as an artist & DJ in residence. With creative partner Matthew Hardern, she has released two albums in collaboration: Nights at The Circus and Albion Voice.

Her first album Nights at the Circus was described as "Falling somewhere between M.I.A. and Simon and Garfunkel via a stint at music college," with Bishi being hailed as "a welcome breath of hair." The album was performed in its entirety with the strings of the London Symphony Orchestra in June 2008 at LSO St Luke's. Also in 2008 she was asked to join a tour of the English female singers 'The Daughters of Albion' alongside the likes of Norma Waterson and June Tabor. She has toured and collaborated with close friend Patrick Wolf and ex-Moloko singer Roisin Murphy. She appeared on Friday Night with Jonathan Ross on Friday 3 October, singing "Never Seen Your Face".

Media appearances include the BBC's Culture Show and Friday Night with Jonathan Ross. She has attracted critical attention and was nominated for the 2008 South Bank Show Awards – the 'Times Breakthrough Award'.

Bishi is characterised by her glamorous and extravagant stage appearance. Her stage commissions and live collaborators have included the London Symphony Orchestra, the English National Opera, the Brooklyn Youth Chorus, the Whitechapel Gallery, Joanna MacGregor, Nico Muhly, Martin Carthy and Norma Waterson. She appeared as a guest at the live premiere of Double Fantasy for Yoko Ono's Meltdown at the Royal Festival Hall in 2013.

Bishi's live performances explore interactive multimedia and film. Albion Voice was featured in Julien Temple's film London The Modern Babylon. Dia Ti Maria, featuring The Kronos Quartet, won best soundtrack for the Manish Arora film Holi Holy at ASVOFF 6: A Shaded View on Fashion Film 6. Bishi featured as a vocalist in Richard Grayson's video installation 'Nothing can Stop us Now,' which consisted of the song "Stalin Wasn't Stallin", made famous by Robert Wyatt, arranged by composer Leo Chadburn.

In 2018, National Sawdust commissioned Bishi to compose and premiere a new piece in New York for the opening of The FERUS Festival, which culminated in Bishi: The Good Immigrant, a song cycle composed for voice looper, sitar and electronics, co-produced with composer and sound artist Jeff Cook. The song cycle was inspired by The Good Immigrant, a collection of essays edited by Nikesh Shukla.

Other musical collaborators have included Anat Ben-David, with Bishi appearing as a vocalist in her opera Kairos. She was also one of the final collaborators of the Labour politician Tony Benn, who contributed spoken word to the single "Look The Other Way".

Bishi has also contributed Vocals to the Sean Lennon-composed soundtrack for the film Ava's Possessions and played sitar on the album Daphne and The Golden Chord, by Daphne Guinness, produced by Tony Visconti. She has recently supported opera punk-chanteuse Kristeen Young and Wolfgang Flür of legendary electronic music pioneers Kraftwerk.

She has also collaborated significantly to a number of pieces by composer Neil Kaczor, most notably "In Sleep", commissioned by the Science Gallery London. She arranged Shakespeare's Sonnet 43, "When most I wink, then do mine eyes best see", for 13 voices. The live presentation utilised the sound of Bishi's brainwaves, recorded from a session conducted with the Evelina sleep clinic, at Guy's Hospital. In 2016, Bishi was commissioned by The Old Church, in Stoke Newington, to make music in response to an interactive wind harp, created by Output Arts. The result, Winds of Fate, has now been released a digital EP.

In March 2021, she performed "Don't Shoot the Messenger" on BBC Radio 4's Loose Ends.

Bishi's third album 'Let My Country Awake' was released in 2021 on Gryphon Records.

== Discography ==
Albums

- Nights at the Circus (2007)
- Albion Voice (2012)
- Let My Country Awake (2021)

EPs

- Take Off (2003)
- BitPop (2005)
- Brainlove 7" Club No. 4 (2007)

Singles

- "Never Seen Your Face" (2007)
- "On My Own Again" (2008)
- "One Nation (Under CCTV)" (2009)
- "Dia Ti Maria" (2011)
- "Winds of Fate" (2018)
- "Don't Shoot The Messenger" (2020)
