= Downing Street Kindling =

Single by Larrikin Love

from the album The Freedom Spark
- Released: 6 June 2006
- Label: Warner
- Producer: Ian Gore

Larrikin Love singles chronology
"Edwould" (2005)	"Downing Street Kindling" (2006)	"Happy as Annie (re-release)" (2006)

"Downing Street Kindling" was the second single to be taken from Larrikin Love's debut album, The Freedom Spark, and their first release to enter the UK Top 40, charting at number 35.

In the song, Larrikin voices his discontent with England, culminating with the proclamation that "I think that it is hell". The title refers to the home of the British Prime Minister, and references one of the song's key lyrics, "I will build a fire in Westminster using the door of Downing Street"

== Track listing ==
=== CD ===
1. "Downing Street Kindling"
2. "Dead Long Dead"

=== 7" Vinyl 1 ===
1. "Downing Street Kindling"
2. "Is It December?"

=== 7" Vinyl 2 ===
1. ""Downing Street Kindling Refix"

== Charts ==
Chart (2006)	Peak position
UK Singles (OCC)	35
