= The Libertine (song) =

Single by Patrick Wolf

from the album Wind in the Wires
- Released: 31 January 2005
- Genre: Indie rock, folktronica
- Length: 3:56
- Label: Tomlab
- Songwriter: Patrick Wolf
- Producer: Patrick Wolf

Patrick Wolf singles chronology
"The Libertine"	""Wind in the Wires""

"The Libertine" is the first single from English singer-songwriter Patrick Wolf's second full-length album Wind in the Wires.

== Track listing ==
=== CD-single ===
1. "The Libertine [Radio Edit]" – 3:56
2. "Penzance" – 5:19
3. "Wind in the Wires [Clifftop Demo]" – 2:26

=== 7" vinyl single ===
1. "The Libertine [Radio Edit]" – 3:56
2. "Afraid" (Nico cover) – 3:09

== Charts ==
Chart (2005)	Peak position
UK Singles Top 75	67
