= Nights at the Circus (album) =

Studio album by Bishi
- Released: 12 November 2007
- Genre: Electronic, world, pop
- Label: Gryphon Records
- Producer: David Peters, Matthew Hardern, Patrick Wolf

Singles from Nights at the Circus
- 1. "Never Seen Your Face" Released: 24 March 2008

Professional ratings
Review scores
Source	Rating
Drowned in Sound	(8/10)

Nights at the Circus is the debut album by British electronic singer Bishi. It was released by Gryphon Records on 12 November 2007. The album's title was inspired by the Angela Carter novel of the same name.

== Track listing ==
1. "Nights at the Circus" – 3:57
2. "Magus" – 3:28
3. "I Am You" – 4:13
4. "The Swan" – 3:32
5. "Grandmother's Floor" – 2:38
6. "Never Seen Your Face" – 4:26
7. "Nightbus" – 2:58
8. "After the Party" – 3:20
9. "Vicious Stories" – 4:37
10. "Broken Creatures" – 3:28
11. "On My Own Again" – 3:50
12. "Namaste" – 4:48
