= Brumalia EP =

EP by Patrick Wolf
- Released: 4 December 2011
- Genre: Indie pop, indietronica
- Length: 27:15
- Label: Mercury Records
- Producer: Patrick Wolf

Patrick Wolf chronology
Lemuralia EP (2011)	Brumalia EP (2011)	Sundark and Riverlight (2012)

Brumalia is a 7-track EP released by English-Irish singer-songwriter Patrick Wolf, to accompany the release of Together, the fourth single from his fifth studio album, Lupercalia. The EP was released on 4 December 2011.

== Album information ==
The title Brumalia comes from an ancient Roman solstice festival honouring Bacchus, often involving drinking and merriment. The name is derived from the Latin word bruma, meaning "shortest day" or even "winter".

Each track was written by Wolf throughout 2011, except for the adaptation of Jerusalem. Production and programming took place in The Pool Studios on Bermondsey Street, London in autumn 2011. The EP features one track created on an iPad, whilst Wolf was travelling through Florida.

== Album artwork ==
The artwork for the EP was shot by Patti Smith. Of the artwork, Wolf said,

"These are two photos Patti took of me on Cooden Beach on a freezing windy Winter day earlier this year the day after I played harp and viola for her at the De La Warr Pavilion. To me the photos sum up the bleakness and melancholy of England in the Winter months, which was something that inspired the choice of songs on this EP"

== Track listing ==
All tracks are written by Patrick Wolf

No.	Title	Length
1.	"Bitten"	4:14
2.	"Together"	4:40
3.	"Time of Year"	4:24
4.	"Jerusalem"	1:52
5.	"Nemoralia"	2:53
6.	"Pelicans"	4:26
7.	"Trust"	4:40

== Reception ==
Professional ratings
Review scores
Source	Rating
Clixie Music	9/10 stars
Drowned in Sound	6/10 stars
The Independent	3/5 stars
NME	7/10 stars
Pitchfork Media	(5.9/10)

The album received mixed to positive reviews. A reviewer at Clixie Music hailed it as a "swirl of beautiful melodies driving a highly romantic record, destined for your hearts from very beginning" that reads "almost like a personal diary from start to finish."

Although reviewer Hayley Avron compliments aspects of the individual tracks, she is unimpressed by the EP as a whole, stating that it is overshadowed by the full-length Lupercalia. Avron concludes that although individually strong, the EP as a whole lacks the "instant warm appeal of the Lupercalia tracks" and "as a mini-album," makes for "an unsteady journey" in which the tracks "end up feeling a little like a case of concept over content." Andy Gill from The Independent describes "Time of Year" as a song with "big beats, cheesy honking reeds and a brief rattle of sleighbells," but does not comment on the overall album. Jazz Monroe from NME commends the album for exposing the "blemishes" otherwise perfected in other artists, but describes much of Wolf's vocals on the album as "wailing," "whining," "warbling," and "brooding." He praises the song "Jerusalem" as a "glisteningly elegiac centrepiece" for the album. Ian Cohen of Pitchfork sees the album as an attempted reconstruction of Wolf's first two LPs, but states that although the album's tracks are "as lavishly produced as his proper records, the little sonic footnotes and specificity give Brumalia a demo-level, real-time immediacy that rarely comes through despite his gregarious persona." Cohen concludes by stating that "Wolf remains theoretically fascinating because he tries too hard" and that the EP "ends up being as frustrating as his previous albums because Wolf appears capable of giving us anything to the point where comfort is not enough."
