= Six Queens =

"Six Queens / Little Boy Lost"

Single by Larrikin Love
- Released: 19 September 2005
- Label: Young and Lost Club Records

Larrikin Love singles chronology
"Six Queens / Little Boy Lost" (2005)	"Happy as Annie" (2005)

"Six Queens" is the debut single by English band Larrikin Love, released in September 2005 on Young and Lost Club Records. Although billed as a double A-side with "Little Boy Lost", the greater popularity of the former among both fans and the band, and the fact that it had a music video made for it means that the release is usually simply referred to as just 'Six Queens'.

Typically for an indie band's first release, the single was very limited with only 500 copies pressed.

The song was later re-recorded by producer Iain Gore for the band's 2006 debut album, The Freedom Spark.

== Track listing ==
1. "Six Queens"
2. "Little Boy Lost"
