= Edwould =

Single by Larrikin Love

from the album The Freedom Spark
- Released: 3 April 2006
- Label: Warner
- Producer: Ian Gore

Larrikin Love singles chronology
"Happy as Annie" (2005)	"Edwould" (2006)	"Downing Street Kindling" (2006)

"Edwould" was the third single from Larrikin Love, and the first to be taken from their debut album The Freedom Spark. It was also the band's first major label release and the first to receive full distribution, and subsequently reached number 49 on the UK charts.

The title and lyrics (seemingly) allude to the first name of the band's vocalist, Edward Larrikin.

== Track listing ==
=== CD ===
1. "Edwould"
2. "It's A Long Way Home to Donegal"

=== 7" Vinyl 1 ===
1. "Edwould"
2. "The Very Sad Ballad Of Brutus From No.72"

=== 7" Vinyl 2 ===
1. ""Edshould"
