= The Patrick Wolf EP =

EP by Patrick Wolf
- Released: November 11, 2002
- Genre: Indie rock, folktronica
- Length: 16:08
- Producer: Patrick Wolf

Patrick Wolf chronology
| The Patrick Wolf EP (2002) | Lycanthropy (2003) |

The Patrick Wolf EP is the debut EP of English-Irish singer-songwriter Patrick Wolf, limited to 1000 copies. The songs, "Bloodbeat" and "A Boy Like Me" would go on to appear on Lycanthropy, Wolf's debut album. "Empress" features a music box playing the lullaby Frere Jacques throughout.

This EP features Leo Chadburn (recorder), Joe Zeitlin (cello) and handclaps from ‘the Special Lady Crew’. Wolf uses: Maplewood grand piano, viola, violin, accordion, and programming on this EP.

== Track listing ==
1. "Bloodbeat" - 3:46
2. "Empress" - 3:55
3. "A Boy Like Me" - 3:26
4. "Pumpkin Soup" - 5:01
