= Lemuralia (EP) =

Lemuralia EP

EP by Patrick Wolf
- Released: 20 June 2011
- Genre: Folktronica, Alternative rock
- Label: Mercury Records
- Producer: Patrick Wolf

Patrick Wolf chronology
Lupercalia (2011)	Lemuralia EP (2011)	Brumalia EP (2011)

Lemuralia is a 7-track bonus disc released by English-Irish singer-songwriter Patrick Wolf, which accompanied the release of his fifth studio album, Lupercalia. It contains previously unheard audio, remixes and tracks in demo stages.

== Availability ==
Lemuralia is only available for purchase from Wolf's official online store, as a bonus disc to the Lupercalia CD or as part of the Super Bundle box set.

== Track listing ==
The track listing for Lemuralia was released on 11 June 2011.

All tracks are written by Patrick Wolf

No.	Title	Length
1.	"William (Wolf Extended Paris Mix)"	3:25
2.	"The Days (Original Piano Sketch Vienna 2006)"	2:40
3.	"The Falcons (Wolf Opus 3 and Orchestra Remix)"	3:50
4.	"Oil Slick"	3:21
5.	"Armistice (Glass Harmonica, Cristal Baschet, Ondes Martenot and Vocal Mix)"	3:18
6.	"Slow Motion (Orchestral Instrumental Mix)"	5:12
7.	"Sing (A Cappella Mix)"	2:41

== Track information ==
Official information regarding the EP states that "You will be able to hear some of the album tracks in their demo stages and various sonic experiments, collaborations and sketches that never made it to the final cut of Lupercalia. Straight from the heart of Patrick's home studio and dusty depths of the Lupercalia tapes and project hard drives."

Wolf says of "Oil Slick" that it "is a section of the symphony I wrote in the year 2000. entrance piece for the composition degree I never finished!"
