= Jonnie Fielding =

British walking tour guide

- Education: University of Leeds
- Occupations: Author; Tour guide; Content creator
- Known for: Bowl of Chalk walking tours
- Website: bowlofchalk.net

Jonnie Fielding is a British author, walking tour guide, and content creator. He is the founder of Bowl of Chalk, a London-based tour company established in 2011 that focuses on the city's social history and lesser-known landmarks. He is the author of Why Downing Street is Painted Black (2025).

== Early life ==
Fielding attended Princethorpe College from 1989 to 1996.

== Career ==
=== Bowl of Chalk ===
Fielding established Bowl of Chalk in 2011 after leaving a career in copywriting. The name is Cockney rhyming slang for "walk". Avoiding traditional tourist circuits, his tours emphasize social history and urban oddities in areas such as the East End, Covent Garden, and the South Bank.

=== Media and digital content ===
He started posting videos on social media in 2020 when he could do any tours. In 2023, Fielding undertook a year-long project to post a "Fun London Fact" video daily across social media. The series significantly expanded his following and led to the launch of his book.

=== Philanthropy ===
Over the weekend of 27–28 July 2024, Fielding led a 24-hour continuous walking tour to benefit London's Air Ambulance charity. Accompanied by 164 participants over a 24-mile route, the event raised £8,489 for the emergency service.

== Bibliography ==
- Why Downing Street is Painted Black (ISBN 978-0008730185). HarperCollins, 2025.
