= The Night Safari =

EP by Patrick Wolf
- Released: 17 March 2023
- Length: 26:11
- Label: Apport

Patrick Wolf chronology
Sundark and Riverlight (2023)	The Night Safari (2023)	Crying the Neck (2025)

The Night Safari is the fifth EP by English singer-songwriter Patrick Wolf, and marked Wolf's first release of new music since his album Lupercalia in 2011. It was released on 17 March 2023, on Wolf's own Apport label. The five-song EP was engineered and co-produced by Brendan Cox and mastered at Abbey Road Studios by Alex Wharton. The vinyl edition was released as a limited print of 1000 "Black River" colored vinyl copies, the first 250 of which were hand numbered and signed by Wolf.

== Background ==
Wolf said that the phrase "Night Safari" emerged from a mental state he'd experienced, particularly during his years away from the music industry. "Many of my album titles – like Wind in the Wires, The Magic Position – have been phrases I've used to describe a mental process or an affliction," he told Dazed. "The Night Safari describes these nights lying by the side of my partner and detaching mentally as I looked at the last two years' – and the next two years' – failures and anxieties. And the realization you're going to have to navigate your way through that to reach the morning."

The songs on Night Safari address some of the difficulties Wolf experienced in the years following the release of his retrospective double album Sundark and Riverlight in 2012, including bankruptcy, his mother's cancer diagnosis and death, and his struggles with addiction and recovery. One of the tracks, "Acheron," refers to a river in Greece, which is also appears in Greek mythology as the entrance to the Greek underworld. Another, "Dodona", refers to the site of the oldest Hellenic Oracle, where Wolf traveled in 2015 in an effort to detox. "I had some kind of Byronic idea that the grand journey was going to change my perspective on life," he said. "I thought I would enter a real state of prolific and insightful work, but from then onwards I stopped writing."

Wolf accompanied the release with a short film titled "The Bowline Knot" that featured videos for the EP's first two tracks, "The Night Safari" and "Nowhere Game," produced by Joseph Wilson. "On one hand the bowline knot is used as a rescue knot to save people who may have fallen down a hole, or off a cliff onto a ledge, yet also it is used as a hunting knot, bowlines are used to create a loop that can easily be placed around an animal's neck, the ocelot slips the bowline knot but soon falls to prey, down the river Acheron, toward the nowhere game where the meeting of Archangel Zadkiel at the top of the tower at the end of our short film presents a challenge. To begin the journey all over again like Sisyphus or continue, cut the string, disappear to begin working out the way to enter the day," Wolf wrote in the accompanying text.

== Reception ==
Professional ratings
Review scores
Source	Rating
Pitchfork	6.8/10
DIY	3/5 stars

For the Quietus, Luke Turner called the EP "A return to DIY self-dependency and, crucially, some of the instrumentation that made his early music so good. It veers between the gloriously dramatic 'Dodona', Michael Nyman via Warp records cracked electronics in 'Acheron', a shuffling modernist crooner in 'Nowhere Game' and to finish off, 'Enter The Day', all rolling piano and optimism."

Pitchfork's Eric Torres gave the EP a 6.8 score and wrote, "Wolf's ear for melody and imagistic lyrics remain strong, knifelike features of his music. Although The Night Safari's sweeping dramas can be dour, Wolf's voice, sonorous and commanding, is only growing finer with age."

Ed Lawson of DIY rated the album three stars and remarked, "His soaring, operatic voice dominates for the most part, while the songs' arrangements dart around it in a swell of melodrama."

== Track listing ==
The Night Safari track listing
No.	Title	Length
1.	"The Night Safari"	6:09
2.	"Nowhere Game"	4:31
3.	"Acheron"	3:27
4.	"Dodona"	7:27
5.	"Enter the Day"	4:37
Total length:		26:11
