= Wind in the Wires =

Studio album by Patrick Wolf
- Released: 2 February 2005
- Genre: Folktronica, downtempo
- Length: 41:39
- Label: Tomlab
- Producer: Patrick Wolf

Patrick Wolf chronology
Lycanthropy (2003)	Wind in the Wires (2005)	The Magic Position (2007)

Singles from Wind in the Wires
- 1. "The Libertine" Released: 31 January 2005; 2. "Wind in the Wires" Released: 13 June 2005; 3. "Tristan" Released: 31 October 2005

Wind in the Wires is the second studio album by English singer-songwriter Patrick Wolf.

Wolf cites Buffy Sainte-Marie as an influence on the album on his official Tumblr.

== Critical reception ==
Professional ratings
Aggregate scores
Source	Rating
Metacritic	80/100
Review scores
Source	Rating
AllMusic	4/5 stars
Drowned in Sound	9/10
The Independent	4/5 stars
Mojo	3/5 stars
NME	8/10
Pitchfork	8.2/10
Q	4/5 stars
Slant Magazine	4.5/5 stars
Stylus Magazine	A−
Uncut	3/5 stars

Wind in the Wires received general acclaim. At Metacritic, which assigns a normalized rating out of 100 to reviews from mainstream critics, the album received an average score of 80, based on 20 reviews, which indicates "generally favorable reviews".

== Track listing ==
All songs written by Patrick Wolf.

1. "The Libertine" – 4:23
2. "Teignmouth" – 4:50
3. "The Shadowsea" – 0:37
4. "Wind in the Wires" – 4:18
5. "The Railway House" – 2:24
6. "The Gypsy King" – 3:08
7. "Apparition" – 1:16
8. "Ghost Song" – 3:13
9. "This Weather" – 4:35
10. "Jacob's Ladder" – 1:21
11. "Tristan" – 2:36
12. "Eulogy" – 1:44
13. "Land's End" – 7:06

== Personnel ==
- Patrick Wolf — vocals, viola, violin, grand piano, baritone ukulele, kantele, mountain dulcimer, Farfisa Transivox Electronic Accordion, reed organ, guitar, bass guitar, synthesizers, bodhrán.
- Derek Apps — clarinet on "Wind in the Wires"
- Jo Apps — female choir on "Teignmouth"
