= The Magic Position =

Studio album by Patrick Wolf
- Released: 26 February 2007
- Genre: Folktronica, indietronica
- Length: 40:49
- Label: Loog
- Producer: Patrick Wolf

Patrick Wolf chronology
Wind in the Wires (2005)	The Magic Position (2007)	The Bachelor (2009)

Singles from The Magic Position
- 1. "Accident & Emergency" Released: 23 October 2006; 2. "Bluebells" Released: 1 January 2007; 3. "The Magic Position" Released: 26 March 2007

Professional ratings
Review scores
Source	Rating
AllMusic	3.5/5 stars
Drowned in Sound	8/10 stars
The Guardian	3/5 stars
NME	8/10 stars
No Ripcord	6/10 stars
Pitchfork	8.3/10
Playlouder	8/10 stars
Slant Magazine	4.5/5 stars
Stylus Magazine	A
This Is Fake DIY	4/5 stars

The Magic Position is the third studio album by English singer-songwriter Patrick Wolf. It was released on 26 February 2007. The album features collaborations with Marianne Faithfull and Edward Larrikin of Larrikin Love as well as backing vocals by Wolf's sister Jo Apps and also bass and alto clarinet instrumentation by Derek Apps. The album was preceded by the singles "Accident & Emergency" and "Bluebells".

Music critics and Wolf himself have noted that this album marks a departure from the musical style of his previous two albums, with this one being more pop-oriented. He cites Boney M and Giorgio Moroder as influences. Slant Magazine named The Magic Position the best album of 2007.

As of 2009 the album has sold 20,400 copies in United Kingdom.

== Critical response ==
The Magic Position received general acclaim from music critics. At Metacritic, which assigns a normalised rating out of 100 to reviews from mainstream critics, the album received an average score of 82, based on 27 reviews, which indicates "universal acclaim".

== Track listing ==
1. "Overture" – 4:40
2. "The Magic Position" – 3:53
3. "Accident & Emergency" (featuring Edward Larrikin) – 3:17
4. "The Bluebell" – 1:11
5. "Bluebells" – 5:17
6. "Magpie" (featuring Marianne Faithfull) – 3:57
7. "X" – 1:05
8. "Augustine" – 4:19
9. "Secret Garden" – 1:49
10. "Get Lost" – 3:17
11. "Enchanted" – 2:07
12. "The Stars" – 3:51
13. "Finale" – 1:57

Digital download

14. "The Marriage" – 2:46

UK enhanced edition

14. "Bluebells" (music video)

Japanese edition

14. "Underworld"
15. "Adder"
16. "Ari's Song" (Misprinted as "Ali's Song")
17. "The Marriage"
18. "Accident & Emergency" (music video)
19. "The Magic Position" (music video)

Canadian edition

14. "The Childcatcher" (live)
15. "Luna & Libertine" (live)

== Singles ==
- 23 October 2006: "Accident & Emergency"
- 1 January 2007: "Bluebells" (download-only)
- 26 March 2007: "The Magic Position"
- 2 July 2007: "Get Lost"

== Personnel ==
- Patrick Wolf – lead vocals, Bosendorfer grand piano, Kawaii Modular synths, baritone & soprano ukuleles, mountain dulcimer, 5- and 15-string kanteles, clavichord, clavinet, programming, theremin, harmonium, autoharp, bells, gongs, handclaps, locks and keys
- Victoria Sutherland – solo violin
- Marianne Faithfull – vocals on "Magpie"
- Jo Apps – backing and sister vocal
- Derek Apps – bass and alto clarinets
- Katy Wright – solo cello
- Mark Rudland – trombones
- Flip Phillipp – vibraphone and glockenspiel
- Edward Larrikin – vocals on "Accident & Emergency"
- Richard Eigner – drums
- Werner Dafeldecker – double bass
- Jeremy Shaw, Richard Eigner, Patrick Pulsinger and Anna at Eastcote – handclaps
- Andreas Kaufmann – first violin
- Alexej Barer – second violin
- Raphael Handschuh – viola
- Rozaliya Rashkova – cello

== Charts ==
Chart performance for The Magic Position
Chart (2007)	Peak position
UK Albums Chart	46
US Top Heatseekers	42
