= Larrikin Love =

English indie rock band

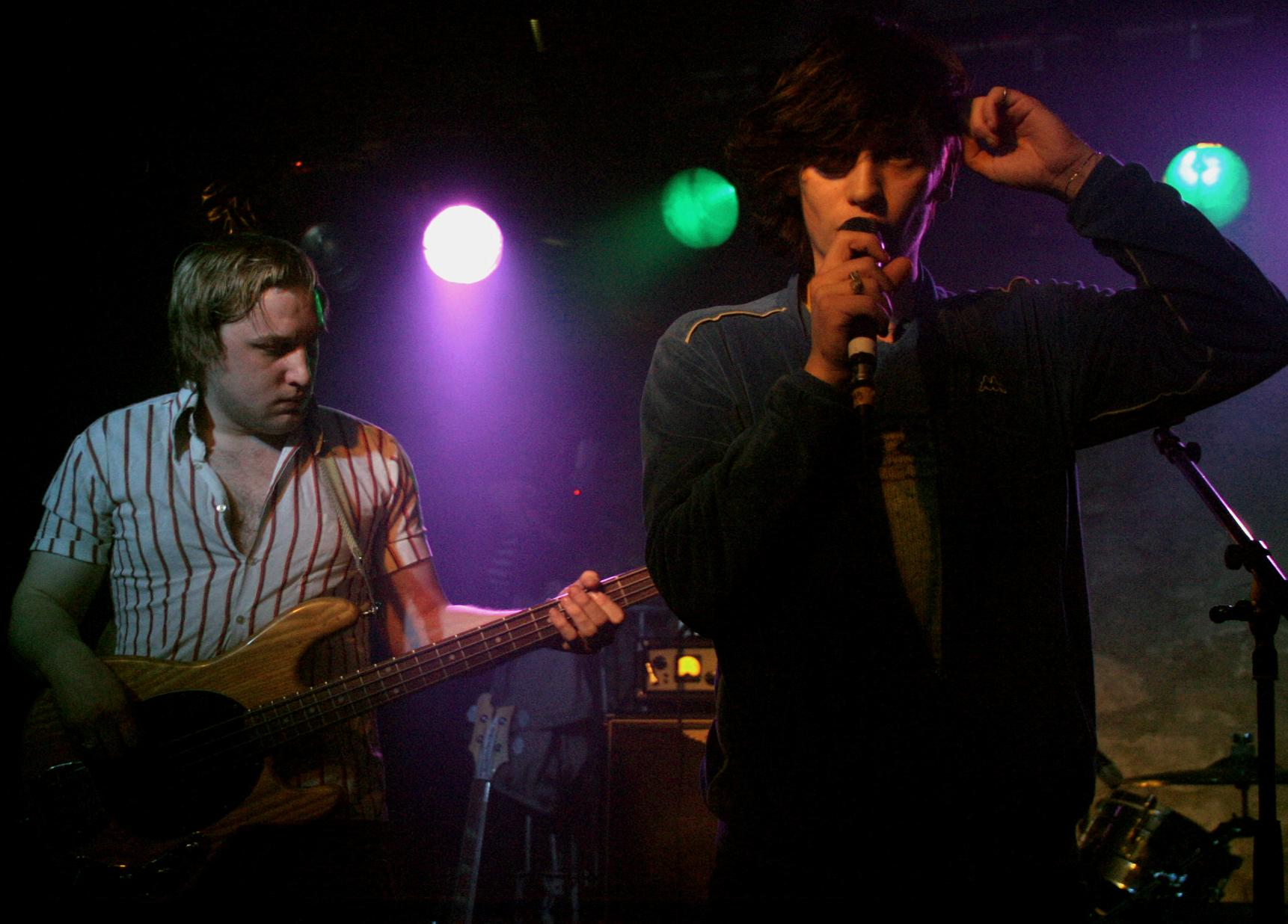
- Larrikin Love live 2006

Background information
- Origin: Twickenham, London, England
- Genres: Indie rock, indie folk
- Years active: 2005–2007
- Label: Warner
- Past members: Edward Leeson; Micko Larkin; Alfie Ambrose; Coz Kerrigan; Robb Skipper; Jonnie Fielding

Larrikin Love were an English four piece indie rock band from London.

Consisting of singer-songwriter Edward Leeson, guitarist Micko Larkin, bassist Alfie Ambrose and drummer Coz Kerrigan, and also occasionally including violinist Robb Skipper from The Holloways or roving violinist Jonnie Fielding, the band were briefly described as being part of a Thamesbeat scene by the NME, a scene which is now widely accepted as having never really existed save as indicating "a group of then emerging artists who didn’t share much in sound, but had a similar spirit as well as geographical location". They experiment with many different styles of music including punk, reggae, calypso, and bluegrass, and tend to add something of an Irish folk flavour to the typical indie rock sound, While often compared musically to bands such as The Clash, The Pogues and The Libertines, the band drew many of their lyrical influences from literature, including writers such as Rimbaud, Wilde and Orwell.

After releasing their first two singles on the independent labels Young and Lost Club and Transgressive Records respectively, the band signed to Warner as part of a 'consultancy deal' between Warner and Transgressive. The band released their debut album, The Freedom Spark, on 25 September 2006.

On 4 May 2007 it was announced that the band had split up, shortly prior to the release of their debut album in continental Europe.

Following the split of the band, Leeson formed the short-lived Pan I Am and Sunless '97, before transitioning to a career in art curation. He is currently the director of the Margate-based art gallery 243 Luz.

Micko Larkin moved to LA, where he worked with Courtney Love before becoming part of a reformed Hole. Ambrose joined Gaoler's Daughter, and Kerrigan joined his brother Fiachra's band Marner Brown, who later changed their name to K. Jonnie Fielding went on to become an author and tour guide around London.

== Discography ==
=== Albums ===
- The Freedom Spark (25 September 2006), No. 37 (UK)

=== Singles ===
- "Six Queens"/"Little Boy Lost" (19 September 2005)
- "Happy as Annie" (2005)
- "Edwould" (3 April 2006), No. 49 (UK)
- "Downing Street Kindling" (6 June 2006), No. 35 (UK)
- "Happy as Annie" (reissue) (18 September 2006), No. 32 (UK)
- "Well, Love Does Furnish a Life" (22 January 2007) No. 31 (UK)

=== Other ===
- "A Horse with No Name" (Cover of the America song) on Take it Easy: 15 Soft Rock Anthems (Q Magazine, 2006)
