= Lycanthropy (album) =

Studio album by Patrick Wolf
- Released: July 28, 2003
- Recorded: 1994–2002
- Genre: Folk-pop; folktronica
- Length: 51:30
- Label: Tomlab
- Producer: Patrick Wolf

Patrick Wolf chronology
The Patrick Wolf EP (2002)	Lycanthropy (2003)	Wind in the Wires (2005)

Lycanthropy is the first studio album by English singer-songwriter Patrick Wolf and was recorded over the eight years between 1994 and 2002. It was critically acclaimed at the time of its release, as was his next effort, Wind in the Wires.

== Production ==
=== Themes ===
In a 2004 interview with Only Angels Have Wings, he said the album's concept arose from his efforts to document the most important moments of his life. The singer chose the title 'Lycanthropy' as "I now had "wolf" as a surname, that I was a lot stronger and resilient than the boy I used to be, that I was concerned with singing about matters of instinct, intuition and emotion... which are matters very much related to the moon".

=== Music and lyrics ===
The album has more sampling and distortion than Wolf's subsequent albums. Also, the album features acoustic guitar on a number of the tracks, an instrument Patrick would practically abandon on his later albums in favour of the baritone ukulele (although he has now begun playing guitar more in his live performances).

Some of the songs have a connection to wolves or werewolves, although not all are immediately apparent. A number of the songs have dark or "mature" undertones, such as the song "The Childcatcher", which tells the story of a boy targeted by a paedophile, and "Lycanthropy", which examines gender dysphoria through abstract lyrics.

== Critical reception ==
Professional ratings
Review scores
Source	Rating
AllMusic	4/5 stars
Pitchfork	(8.2/10)
PlayLouder	4/5 stars
Stylus Magazine	B−
Almost Cool Music Reviews	8/10 stars

The album was met with positive reviews. Kenyon Hopkin describes the debut as "relentlessly resourceful, never failing to reveal a new instrument." Dan Lett of Pitchfork praises the album, describing it as "folk-pop musings in lush blankets of violin, viola, harp and harpsichord, and tricks out the mix with aggressive electronic textures." Lett compliments Wolf's vocals and "A Boy Like Me" as a thoughtful pop songs "for the ubiquitous dissolute youth." Although Lett praises much of the album overall, he notes that the only complaint against the album is its lack of subtlety, "as it's possessed by a heady, pubescent intoxication that can result in some indiscriminate vocalizing." Nick Southall from Stylus Magazine offers the most critical evaluation of the album with tongue-in-cheek references to Wolf's canine inspiration, but describes the album in general as "Bizarre and whimsical and freakish and compelling in equal measure." A reviewer at Almost Cool Music reviews offers a similar interpretation of the album, citing it as "both literary and pretentious," but also describes it as one of the best debuts. DIY writer George Boorman called Lycanthropy an "arty album of folktronica".

== Track listing ==
No.	Title	Length
1.	"Prelude"	1:31
2.	"Wolf Song"	3:28
3.	"Bloodbeat"	3:51
4.	"To the Lighthouse"	4:04
5.	"Pigeon Song"	3:34
6.	"Don't Say No"	4:02
7.	"The Childcatcher"	4:30
8.	"Demolition"	6:06
9.	"London"	3:54
10.	"Paris"	4:44
11.	"Peter Pan"	1:53
12.	"Lycanthropy"	4:10
13.	"A Boy Like Me"	3:28
14.	"Epilogue"	2:06
