= Lupercalia (album) =

Studio album by Patrick Wolf
- Released: 20 June 2011
- Genre: Indie pop, indietronica
- Length: 41:05
- Label: Mercury
- Producer: Patrick Wolf

Patrick Wolf chronology
| The Spinster EP (2009) | Lupercalia (2011) | Lemuralia EP (2011) |

Singles from Lupercalia
- 1. "The City" Released: 14 March 2011; 2. "House" Released: 23 May 2011; 3. "Time of My Life" Released: 16 September 2011; 4. "Together" Released: 5 December 2011

Professional ratings
Aggregate scores
| Source | Rating |
|---|---|
| Metacritic | 72/100 |
Review scores
| Source | Rating |
| AllMusic | 4/5 stars |
| Digital Spy | 4/5 |
| The Independent | 3/5 stars |
| The Guardian | 4/5 stars |
| NME | 4/5 stars |
| Pitchfork | 5.5/10 |
| Q | 4/5 stars |
| The Skinny | 3/5 stars |
| Slant Magazine | 4.5/5 stars |
| Sputnikmusic | 4.5/5 |

Lupercalia is the fifth studio album by English singer-songwriter Patrick Wolf, released on 20 June 2011 by Hideout, a subsidiary of Mercury Records.

== Album information ==
Formerly The Conqueror – originally the second part of a double album entitled Battle – the album's title and concept was changed by Wolf in August 2010.

On 4 November 2010, Wolf announced that the first single from the album was to be 'Time of My Life' and the song was posted on YouTube. The second single, entitled "The City", was released 14 March 2011.

On 23 December 2010, Wolf announced via Twitter that, while he had considered multiple album titles, such as 'The Native' and 'Tahina Spectabilis' with fan support he decided on Lupercalia, reflecting the "festival of love" theme of the album.

Speaking to Digital Spy in March 2011, of the album Wolf said:

"There are about four sad, melancholy moments on the album, but in general it's jubilant and about falling deeply in love. It's a really romantic record and it's extremely honest. Every song is a true story and not disguised with the folklore and fairytale that I've been known for in the past."

On why the album is entitled Lupercalia, Wolf said,

"Songs about love are obviously the most common theme in pop music, but I wanted to approach it in a way that hadn't been done before. The title refers to the Lupercalia festival, which is the ancient fertility and love festival that happens around Valentine's Day. I strive to be original – it's one of my biggest ambitions. There can be nothing worse sometimes than a soppy love record – imagine if I'd called it To Love: Patrick Wolf!"

A 7-track bonus disc titled ‘Lemuralia’ was released alongside the album online, containing album tracks in demo stages – it acts as an EP companion to Lupercalia.

Alongside the album's release, Wolf was featured on the cover of national UK publication Notion. The feature included an interview with writer Alex Lee Thomson, clothes by James Long, and photos by James Moriarty.

The track "The Days" is featured over the end titles to the 2017 film God's Own Country.

== The Conqueror era ==
The fifth album was originally part of a double album entitled Battle, named for the Sussex town where he recorded the new material. On 19 February 2009, Wolf announced that Battle had been split into two releases, The Bachelor and The Conqueror (although the latter album title was subsequently changed to Lupercalia).

The Bachelor was released on 1 June 2009 and the new album was released in 2011. Speaking of the decision to split the release into two albums rather than the double album, Wolf expressed the desire "not to overload people with too much". He has since suggested that while The Bachelor was practically finished, he felt that there were still "a couple of songs or stories to be written for the second part".

Speaking to Spinner in February 2009, Wolf explained that while "The Bachelor has themes of loneliness, hedonism, depression and melancholy...[The Conqueror] is all my depression being suddenly lifted by true love."

It was originally planned that Wolf would work in collaboration with Bandstocks again to fund the new album, as was done with The Bachelor. However, due to Wolf being signed to Mercury Records, this did not happen.

In an interview with Gay&Night magazine from The Netherlands in July 2009, it was revealed that Tilda Swinton would be appearing in some tracks on the new album, as was the case on The Bachelor.

In an interview with The Times on 12 August 2009, Wolf confirmed that Groove Armada were collaborating with him on tracks for the album. Suggesting that the album would draw influences from Motown and disco, he described it as "not cheese, it's happy, pornographic music. You can be quite experimental but produce anthems that people want to get married to, you know, have that first dance at a wedding thing. Music for your first kiss."

In late August 2010, on his Twitter page, Wolf revealed that both the album's name and concept had changed.

== Tours ==
=== Pre-release tour ===
In the lead up to the album's release, Wolf toured Russia, Ireland, Scotland, England, France, Belgium, Holland, Germany, Poland, Austria, Switzerland, Portugal, Turkey and Sweden. The tour culminated at festivals in the Isle of Wight, Glastonbury, Balado (T in the Park) and Reading and Leeds in the UK.

=== Lupercalia Tour ===
Between October and December 2011, Wolf played a promotional tour, the Lupercalia Tour. The tour started on 22 October in Scotland and visited England, Ireland, France, Turkey, Denmark, Sweden, Norway, Germany, Poland, Switzerland, Italy, Austria, Czech Republic, Finland and Russia.

Wolf announced via Twitter on 27 July 2011 that the main support act for the UK and Ireland leg of the tour would be English singer-songwriter CocknBullKid.

On 30 August 2011, Wolf announced a remix competition for the song 'Time of My Life'. The winning three entries would be featured on Wolf's website, and in addition he would pick his top remix to perform on tour.

== Track listing ==
A preview of The Bachelor was released on the Bandstocks website, and later featured on Wolf's MySpace page, entitled "Battle Megamix". The megamix featured two songs not found on The Bachelor ("Time of My Life" and "Together"), which now appear on the new album.

The official track listing was confirmed on 21 February 2011.

All tracks are written by Patrick Wolf.

| No. | Title | Length |
|---|---|---|
| 1. | "The City" | 4:13 |
| 2. | "House" | 3:31 |
| 3. | "Bermondsey Street" | 3:26 |
| 4. | "The Future" | 2:54 |
| 5. | "Armistice" | 3:29 |
| 6. | "William" | 0:51 |
| 7. | "Time of My Life" | 4:21 |
| 8. | "The Days" | 4:53 |
| 9. | "Slow Motion" | 5:10 |
| 10. | "Together" | 4:40 |
| 11. | "The Falcons" | 3:35 |

Deluxe version
| No. | Title | Writer(s) | Producer(s)/Director(s) | Length |
|---|---|---|---|---|
| 12. | "I" (Video Portrait) | | John Lindquist |
| 13. | "II" (Video Portrait) | | John Lindquist |
| 14. | "III" (Video Portrait) | | John Lindquist |
| 15. | "IV" (Video Portrait) | | John Lindquist |
| 16. | "V" (Video Portrait) | | John Lindquist |
| 17. | "Anthem" (bonus track, cover) | Leonard Cohen, Rebecca De Mornay, Yoav Goren | | 4:53 |
| 18. | "Sing" (bonus track) | | | 3:01 |

== Charts ==
Chart performance for Lupercalia
| Chart (2011) | Peak position |
|---|---|
| Austrian Albums (Ö3 Austria) | 47 |
| UK Albums (OCC) | 37 |
