= The Bachelor (album) =

Studio album by Patrick Wolf
- Released: 1 June 2009
- Genre: Indietronica, folktronica, electronica
- Length: 52:53
- Label: Bloody Chamber Music
- Producer: Patrick Wolf

Patrick Wolf chronology
The Magic Position (2007)	The Bachelor (2009)	The Spinster EP (2009)

Singles from The Bachelor
- 1. "Vulture" Released: 20 April 2009; 2. "Hard Times" Released: 6 July 2009; 3. "Damaris" Released: 14 December 2009

The Bachelor is the fourth studio album by English singer-songwriter Patrick Wolf. The organ parts were recorded using the organ at St. George's church in Brede, East Sussex. The album peaked at number 49 on the UK Albums Chart. The album was mixed at The Chairworks recording complex in Yorkshire.

== Album information ==
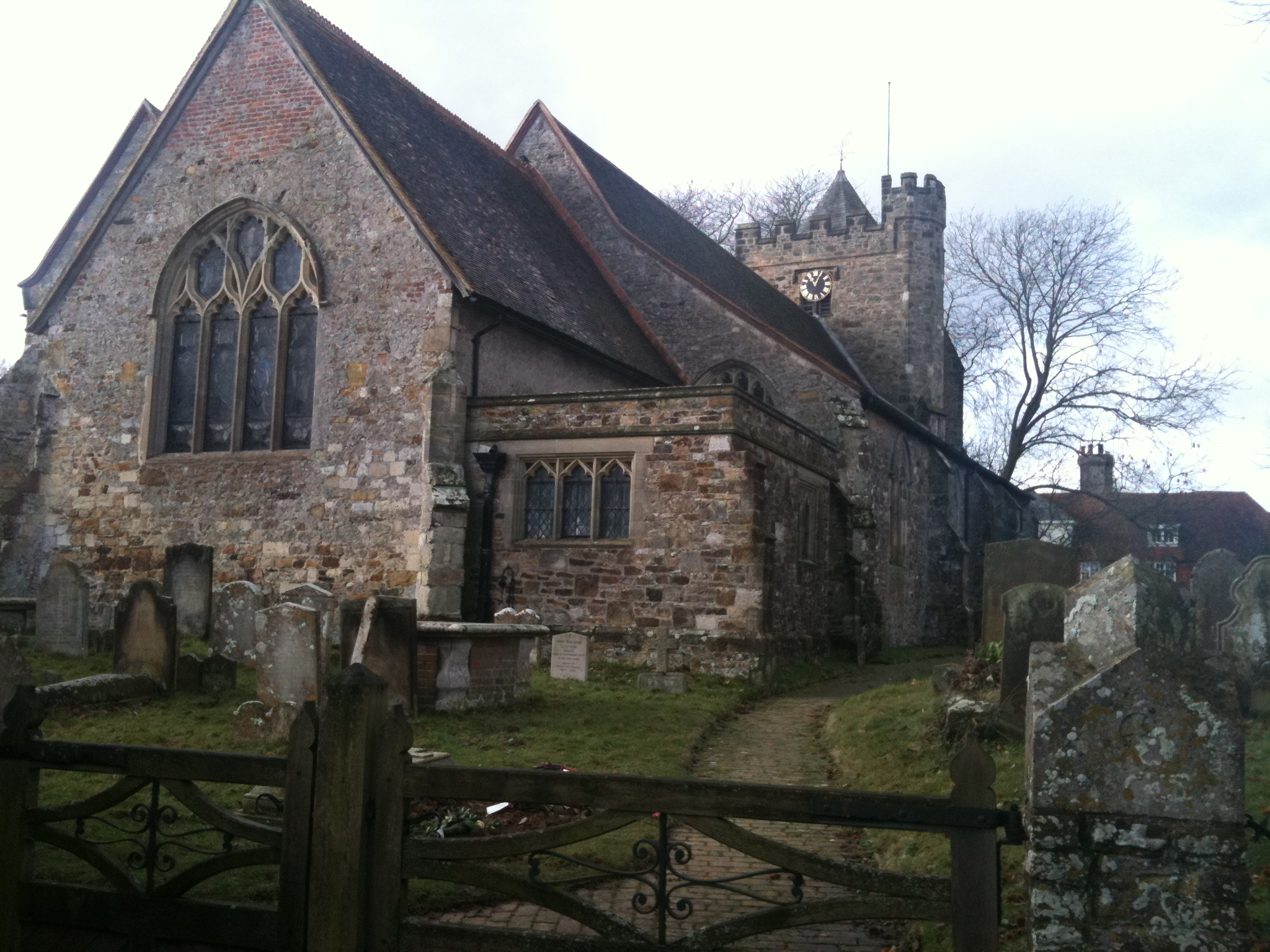
St. George's Church in Brede, East Sussex taken in February 2011, where the organ parts of the album were recorded.

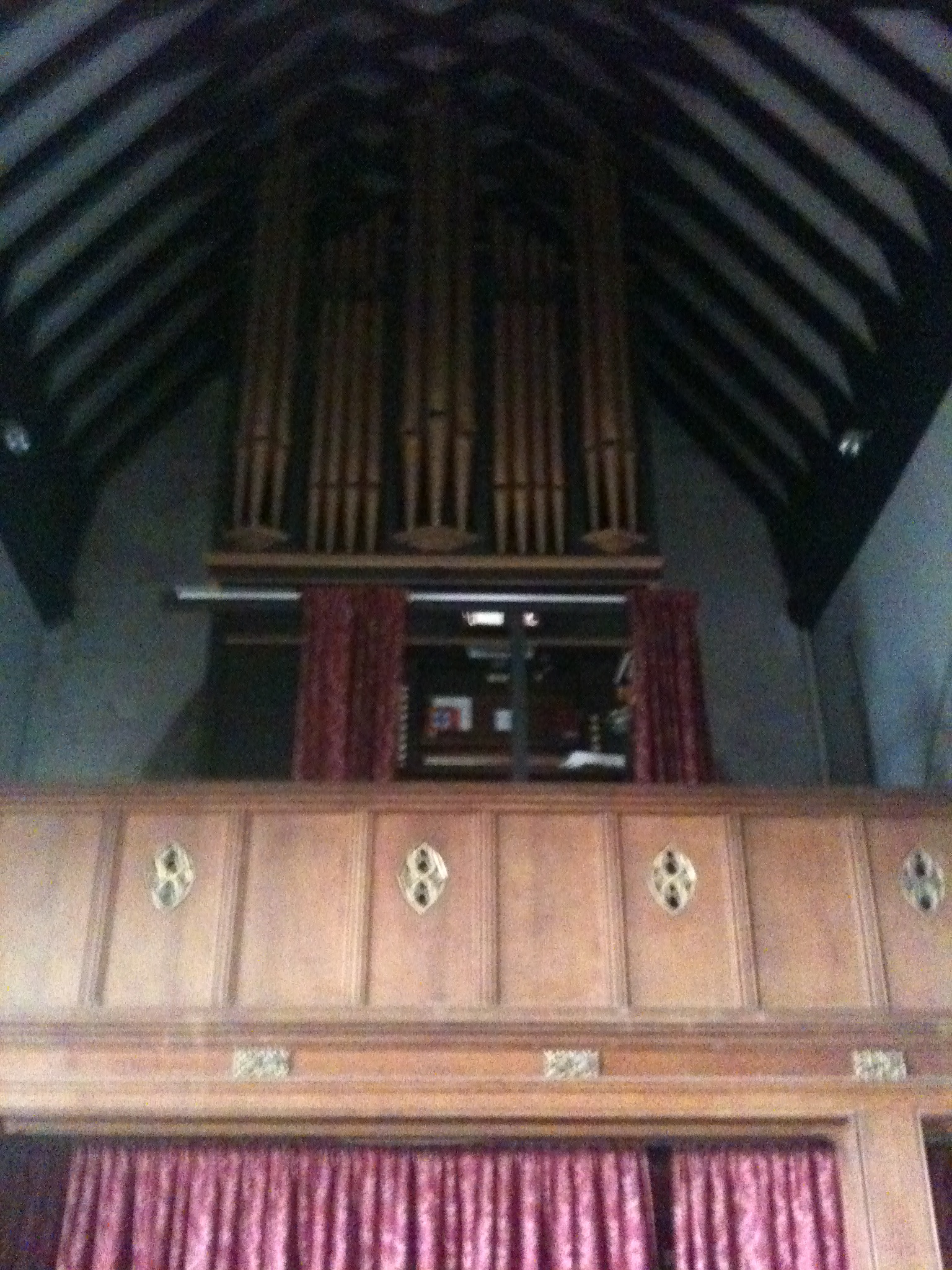
The organ itself inside the church. Taken from below the ground, the organ is above a case of stairs behind a door locked to the general public.

The Bachelor was originally part of a double album entitled Battle, named for the Sussex town where he recorded the new material. On 19 February 2009, Wolf announced that Battle had been split into two releases, The Bachelor and The Conqueror. The Bachelor would be released 1 June 2009 and The Conqueror would see release in 2010. Speaking of the decision to split the release into two albums rather than the double album, Wolf expressed the desire "not to overload people with too much". He has since suggested that while The Bachelor was practically finished, he felt that there were still "a couple of songs or stories to be written for the second part".

A preview of the album as well as 2 tracks presumed to be appearing on The Conqueror were released on the Bandstocks website, and later featured on Wolf's MySpace page, entitled "Battle Megamix".

Guest musicians on The Bachelor include Atari Teenage Riot's Alec Empire (Vulture, Battle), actress Tilda Swinton (Oblivion, Thickets, Theseus), folk musician Eliza Carthy (The Bachelor) and avant-garde electronic pioneer Matthew Herbert (Who Will?).

The first single from the album is "Vulture", which was released on 20 April 2009, with "Hard Times" as the second single, released in July. The third single, Damaris, was released on 14 December 2009.

The album artwork features Patrick in a similar position to his first album, Lycanthropy, and also features a similar font placement.

== Reception ==
Professional ratings
Review scores
Source	Rating
AbsolutePunk	(82/100)
Allmusic	3.5/5 stars
Clash	9/10 stars
Drowned in Sound	8/10 stars
The Guardian	3/5 stars
NME	7/10 stars
The Observer	4/5 stars
Pitchfork Media	(6.2/10)
Q Magazine	4/5 stars
Slant Magazine	4.5/5 stars
Uncut	4/5 stars

ClashMusic.com awarded The Bachelor 9/10, reviewer Teri Williams writing: "(It is), like so many romantic yarns before it, epic - and a whispered breath away from sheer perfection."

== Track listing ==
All songs were written by Patrick Wolf, except track 4, which takes its lyrics from the old Appalachian folk song "Poor Little Turtle Dove", track 9 and 13 by Patrick Wolf and Alec Empire.

1. "Kriegspiel" – 0:47
2. "Hard Times" – 3:33
3. "Oblivion" (featuring Tilda Swinton as "The Voice of Hope") – 3:24
4. "The Bachelor" (featuring Eliza Carthy) – 3:13
5. "Damaris" – 5:28
6. "Thickets" (featuring Tilda Swinton as "The Voice of Hope") - 4:08
7. "Count of Casualty" – 5:03
8. "Who Will?" – 3:31
9. "Vulture" – 3:22
10. "Blackdown" – 5:21
11. "The Sun Is Often Out" – 3:33
12. "Theseus" (featuring Tilda Swinton as "The Voice of Hope") – 4:40
13. "Battle" – 3:07
14. "The Messenger" – 3:39

== Certifications, peaks and sales ==
Country/Region	Peak position
United Kingdom	49
