= Patrick Wolf =

English singer-songwriter

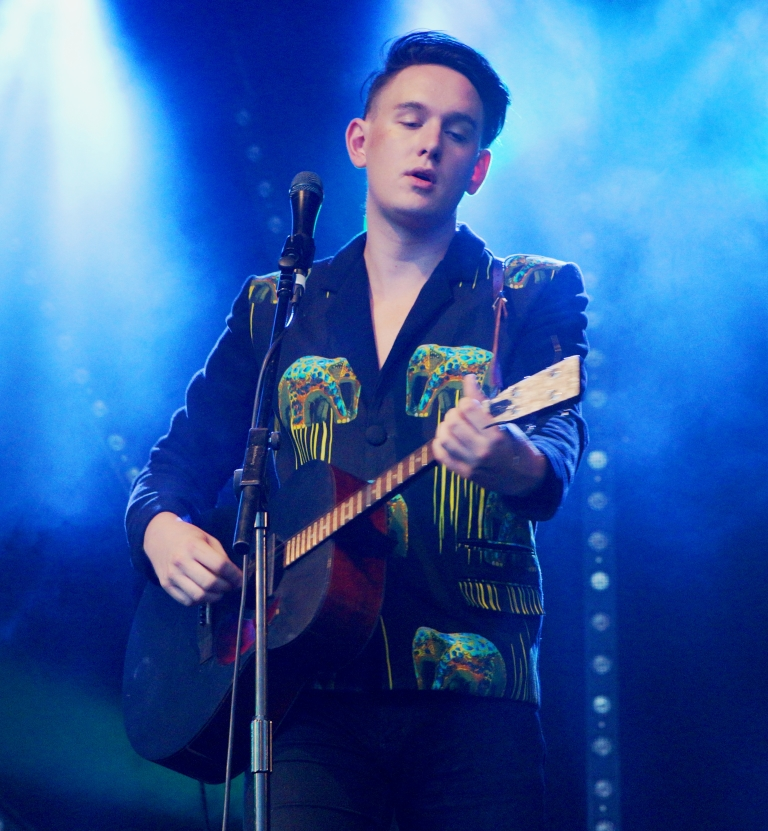
- Patrick Wolf in 2013

Background information
- Born: Patrick Denis Apps; London, England
- Genres: Baroque pop, folktronica, trip hop
- Occupation: Singer-songwriter
- Instruments: Vocals, piano, keyboards, ukulele, viola, violin, guitar, bass, mandolin, kantele, dulcimer, harp, accordion
- Years active: 2002–present
- Labels: Low Altitude Records; Faith & Industry; Tomlab; Loog; Bloody Chamber Music; Mercury Records
- Website: www.patrickwolf.com

Patrick Wolf (born Patrick Denis Apps) is an English singer-songwriter from South London. Wolf uses a wide variety of instruments in his music, most commonly the ukulele, piano, and viola. He is known for combining electronic sampling with classical instruments. Wolf's styles range from electronic pop to Baroque chamber music. He has been making music since around 2002.

== Early life and education ==
Patrick Wolf was born Patrick Denis Apps in St Thomas' Hospital, South London.

He attended King's College School and Bedales School.

== Career ==
=== Lycanthropy and Wind in the Wires ===
Wolf's ongoing writing and recordings brought him to the attention of Fat Cat Records, who provided him with an Atari computer and a mixing console. During the recording of Lycanthropy, Wolf studied composition at Trinity College of Music for one year. Lycanthropy was released in the summer of 2003. He also made some guest appearances as a viola player with Chicks on Speed, Arcade Fire, Owen Pallett, CocoRosie, and The Hidden Cameras. The Germany-based Tomlab later released the album in America and Europe. His second album of 2005, Wind in the Wires, which was inspired by Wolf's Cornish and Irish roots, was released on the same label and likewise met with critical acclaim. The single Tristan, based on the Cornish legend, Tristram of Lyonesse, received significant attention from critics and remains a fan favourite.

=== The Magic Position ===
Following the success of Wind in the Wires, Wolf signed a record deal with Loog in 2005 and began recording his third album, The Magic Position, which featured collaborations with Marianne Faithfull and Edward Larrikin of Larrikin Love. Its official release on 26 February met with critical acclaim, and gained a degree of commercial success due to the relative accessibility compared to his previous works. The Magic Position was released in the United States on Low Altitude Records on 1 May 2007. A concept album on the theme of love, the majority of the album was written after the end of a long term intimate relationship. In January 2007, the first of six vodcasts was made available on iTunes. The series included live performances of old and new material and interviews. Wolf promoted the album with a concert tour in North America, Europe, Japan, and Australia, culminating in two sold out nights at London's Shepherd's Bush Empire. Both of these shows, which were shot and directed by photographer Brantley Gutierrez, are in development to be shown on a Virgin channel and then released on DVD.

=== The Bachelor and Lupercalia ===
Wolf began work on his next album, initially titled Battle, immediately after The Magic Position tour ended. The album was originally conceived as a political album. The focus then shifted to the depression experienced by Wolf during the tour. However, before entering the studio, he fell in love, changing the direction of the album again, and eventually providing enough material for two releases. Wolf parted ways with Universal Records, and on 10 December 2008 announced to NME his plan to sell £10 shares of the album on bandstocks.com: "Basically, you can invest in the finishing of the album and the production of it, and you get a share in the album. So you almost become part of the record company, like a co-owner of the album." On 12 February 2009, Wolf announced that the two discs would be titled The Bachelor and The Conqueror (although the latter album title has subsequently been changed). The Bachelor's first single, "Vulture", was released on 2 April 2009, on vinyl and digital download. The B-sides include new song, "The Tinderbox", and remixes of the title track.

The Bachelor was released on 1 June 2009, while the second single from the album, "Hard Times", was released on 6 July 2009. The third and final single, "Damaris", was released on 14 December 2009.

In April 2010 it was announced that Wolf had signed a record deal with Hideout, a subsidiary of Mercury Records, which released his fifth album, Lupercalia. The final title was announced via Twitter on 23 December 2010.

On 4 November 2010, Wolf announced that the first single from Lupercalia was to be "Time of My Life" and the song was uploaded onto YouTube. Of the song, Wolf said: "'Time of My Life' is a song that I began writing at the end of a relationship in 2006 and then finished three years later during a temporary break-up in my current relationship. The new album has a direct narrative about love and optimism surviving through adversity and recession. I wanted to celebrate the love and hope I have found in the last few years." The song was released on 6 December 2010. He also announced that Lupercalia would be released in May 2011.

Wolf released Lupercalia 20 June 2011 worldwide (excluding USA, where it was released 28 June 2011). In the same month, Wolf was featured on the cover of national UK publication Notion), which included an interview conducted by writer Alex Lee Thomson, clothes by James Long, and photos by James Moriarty.

=== Sundark and Riverlight and The Ghost Region ===
On 18 May 2012 Wolf announced that he was working on his next album, to be released later in the year: "I'm going back to the studio and recording my jubilee record... The album will be totally, totally, totally stripped down. It's time for me to be retrospective about the last ten years before I move onto the next ten. I'm 28 and I think it's quite fun to sing the songs you wrote as a teenager."

It was announced on 9 August that his next release would be a double album entitled Sundark and Riverlight, celebrating Wolf's 10 years as a recording artist. The album will feature acoustic re-recordings of songs from throughout his career, as well as previously unheard tracks. It will be released on 25 September. The title song, a remake of Overture originally from the album The Magic Position, was released on YouTube and then on iTunes on 7 September. Sundark and Riverlight is now available to stream in full online.

In March 2012 he announced on BBC Radio 6's Tom Robinson Show that he would be taking the first sabbatical of his career before pursuing the next chapter of his musical journey. The Sundark and Riverlight tour ended on 6 April at London's Queen Elizabeth Hall.

In 2013, Wolf went on to finish the last dates of Patti Smith's Banga tour on Celtic harp and viola.

=== Hiatus ===
Following the release of Sundark and Riverlight, Wolf experienced "a general burn-out, ill-timed to coincide with a 'cluster-fuck of financial and legal problems regarding management'"; until 2015, he spent time writing, alone, in a makeshift studio in a South London stable block. In August that year, having announced pre-orders for his poetry collection, The Ghost Region, he was hit by a motorist while on holiday in Venice, shortly after which his mother fell ill. Of this period Wolf stated: "It completely whacked me out for six... I'm very happy to be here right now. I'll leave it at that."

In October 2017 Wolf confirmed that he was in the final stages of recording his album and getting ready to release his poetry book The Ghost Region, which had originally been made available for pre-order two years earlier.

=== Musical activities from 2018 onward ===
Wolf had resumed touring by July 2018, including in Australia, where he planned to mix an album while staying in the New South Wales Blue Mountains. He had also completed the poetry book he had been working on in 2015. The Telegraph reviewed Wolf's "comeback", the first of three shows at the St Pancras Old Church in London in January 2020, noting, despite occasional "bum notes" and "forgotten lyrics", that the performance offered "exquisite highs", and Wolf's songs were noted to be "wildly dramatic and original... with vivid lyrics and exuberant melodic flair".

In November 2022, Wolf released his first new single in a decade, "Enter the Day," which was featured on his EP "The Night Safari," released in April 2023. This coincided with the 20th anniversary of his debut EP. In December 2023, Wolf released The Circling Sky, a collection of B-sides and rarities. In February 2025, he announced his seventh album, Crying the Neck to be released on 25 April, which was later postponed to 13 June. The announcement was accompanied by the first single from the album, "Dies Irae". Wolf went on tour in Europe, the UK, and North America throughout 2025 supporting Crying the Neck.

In May 2026, Wolf announced the release of a new double single, "The Beast" and "The Laughing Dove" ahead of his North American tour.

== Recognition and awards ==
In October 2011, Wolf accepted an "Outstanding Contribution To the Arts" award from Trinity LGBT.

In October 2017, it was announced that he was to receive The Edmund Burke Medal from Trinity College Historical Society, Dublin the following December for Outstanding Contribution to Discourse through the Arts, becoming the first LGBT artist to do so, and to celebrate he would be doing one-off gigs in Dublin and London, which would be his only shows for the year.

== In film ==
Wolf appears in the eponymous 2026 documentary film Wolf, directed by Christian Cargill with narration provided by Tilda Swinton, covering his childhood, formative years, struggles, and creating new music after 13 years.

== Personal life ==
A fan of Kenickie, in 1997 Wolf appeared as an extra in the music video for Nightlife.

Wolf reflects that as a teenager, he was bullied at school in Wimbledon for his perceived eccentricity and effeminacy. He stated: "Wimbledon is my trauma area". At the time, he was unsure whether he was gay or bisexual. Mentors at school treated him with disdain when he came to them for support on the issue. The bullying problem was only rectified after his mother changed schools. Wolf comments, "With gay or bi people, I think education still wonders if it's a nature-versus-nurture thing. If you were black, they'd know they couldn't change you, and racist bullying would never be condoned, but if someone is quite feminine or knows they might be gay at 13, they think they can change you with a bit of rugby".

On 27 February 2007, in an interview with The London Paper, Wolf raised questions about his sexuality: "In the same way I don't know if my sixth album is going to be a death-metal record or children's pop, I don't know whether I'm destined to live my life with a horse, a woman or a man. It makes life easier". In a 5 July 2007 interview with Sydney's Star Observer, he confirmed his sexuality: "My sexuality is kind of liberal. I fall in love with men and women. I guess you would call me bisexual. I like to have sex and fall in love—I don't like giving terminology for my sexuality". Later, in 2009, Wolf told The Guardian that though in the past he has had relationships with women, he currently identifies himself as gay. As an artist, Wolf reflects that he does not like to worry about whether he makes a record "too gay or too straight or too this or too that".

Wolf struggled with substance abuse in his early career, and has been sober since 2020.

At the end of Covid lockdown, Wolf relocated to Ramsgate where he set up his new home, studio, and garden. On 2026 August 22, he won second prize in the cucumber and aubergine categories of the Ramsgate Horticultural Society summer competition.

== Modelling ==
Wolf, along with The Paddingtons, Edward Larrikin, and The View, was featured in a series of photographs by Mario Testino as a part of a campaign for Burberry in August 2007.

In 2011, a portrait of Wolf was painted by British artist Joe Simpson, the painting was exhibited around the UK including a solo exhibition at The Royal Albert Hall.

== Discography ==
- The Patrick Wolf EP (2002)
- Lycanthropy (2003)
- Wind in the Wires (2005)
- The Magic Position (2007)
- The Spinster EP (2009)
- The Bachelor (2009)
- Lupercalia (2011)
- Lemuralia EP (2011)
- Brumalia EP (2011)
- Sundark and Riverlight (2012)
- The Night Safari EP (2023)
- The Last of England EP (2025)
- Better or Worse EP (2025)
- Crying the Neck (2025)

== Bloody Chamber Music ==
Bloody Chamber Music
- Founded: 2008
- Founder: Patrick Wolf
- Genre: Pop, Alternative
- Country of origin: UK
- Location: London

Bloody Chamber Music is an independent record label founded by Patrick Wolf. Label was named after Angela Carter's book, The Bloody Chamber, that thrilled Wolf in his early years. Wolf originally started the label as somewhere to store his digital back-catalogue of music. However, he has since explained that due to music piracy, as well as the current economic climate, some artists have been finding it difficult to stay in music. Bloody Chamber Music is a label which will allow such artists to follow their vocation, and be supported by their fans.

=== Bandstocks ===
Bandstocks was an early music crowdfunding website. Patrick Wolf collaborated with his fans through Bandstocks for his album release, The Bachelor.

=== Artists ===
- Patrick Wolf
- Craig Template
