= List of Dog with a Blog episodes =

Dog with a Blog is an American comedy television series that aired on Disney Channel, premiering on October 12, 2012, and ending on September 25, 2015. The series stars G Hannelius, Blake Michael, Francesca Capaldi, Regan Burns, and Beth Littleford. The series also features the voice of Stephen Full.

== Series overview ==
Season	Episodes	Originally released	
Season	Episodes	First released	Last released
1	22	October 12, 2012	August 25, 2013
2	24	September 20, 2013	September 12, 2014
3	23	September 26, 2014	September 25, 2015

== Episodes ==
=== Season 1 (2012–13) ===
No. overall	No. in season	Title	Directed by	Written by	Original release date	Prod. code	U.S. viewers (millions)
1	1	"Stan of the House"	Neal Israel	Philip Stark; Michael B. Kaplan	October 12, 2012	101	4.50
Avery Jennings and Tyler James are step-siblings who are complete opposites. Ever since their parents, Ellen Jennings and Bennett James, married and moved in together, Avery and Tyler cannot seem to get along. Bennett then adopts a shelter dog in the hopes that it will inspire Avery and Tyler to bond over taking care of him. When the children discover that their supposedly ordinary dog, Stan, has the ability to speak, they must work together in order to keep it a secret from everyone, especially their parents. After Avery and Tyler get into an argument, Stan runs away back into the shelter and the children create a plan to get Stan home. Guest stars: Harvey Guillen as Glenn, Audrey Whitby as Sabrina
2	2	"The Fast and the Furriest"	Neal Israel	Michael B. Kaplan	November 4, 2012	102	3.35
After Tyler gets his learner's permit, he wants to practice driving alone due to his parents annoying him, and everyone taking advantage of him. Chaos ensues when Stan crashes the car because he wanted to be like a person, and everyone thinks Tyler did it. Meanwhile, Ellen and Bennett relive the memories they shared with Tyler and Avery when they were children and realize that they are grown-up, so they start cherishing memories with Chloe.
3	3	"Dog with a Hog"	Neal Israel	Judd Pillot	November 11, 2012	103	2.99
Avery and her best friend, Lindsay (Kayla Maisonet), are in desperate need of a replacement to be the school mascot to perform at the homecoming game. Stan convinces Avery to let him be the school mascot, but she is worried because the rival team always pulls horrible pranks on the mascots. Guest star: Kayla Maisonet as Lindsay
4	4	"Wingstan"	Neal Israel	Richard Gurman	November 18, 2012	106	3.68
After Tyler develops a crush on their new neighbor, Nikki Ortiz (Denyse Tontz), he invites her to walk their dogs together. Tyler enlists Stan to be his wing-man, and to Stan's dismay, he cannot stand Nikki's Pomeranian, Evita, due to her incessant barking. Guest star: Denyse Tontz as Nikki Ortiz
5	5	"World of Woofcraft"	Shelley Jensen	Steve Jarczak; Shawn Thomas	November 25, 2012	108	2.58
Stan has been addicted to a game called Realm of the Tower, where he made a new friend, Kilgore (Kevin). When the game-players are gathering at the park, Stan asks Avery to pretend to be him, so he can go and meet Kilgore. Guest star: Garrett Ryan as Kilgore
6	6	"Bark! The Herald Angels Sing"	Neal Israel	John Peaslee	December 2, 2012	104	3.82
It is the family's first Christmas together and Bennett agrees to Ellen's tradition of secret Christmas presents for the children, rather than his tradition of letting them pick out their own gifts. Because Ellen is known to give bad gifts, Avery preps Tyler and Chloe so they can act delighted when they open her presents to them. Worried that the presents may be worse than they can imagine, Stan and the children decide to search for the gifts and secretly open them early to be fully prepared. Upon opening their presents, Stan, Tyler and Chloe find that Ellen got them good gifts, but Avery is disappointed with her present. Ellen is upset when she overhears Avery criticizing her gift, and after a talk between the two, Ellen learns that Avery also disliked her previous Christmas gifts, so Ellen vows to get her a present she will like. On Christmas, Avery is satisfied to unwrap a gift card as her present from Ellen, as it gives her control over what to buy for Christmas. Meanwhile, Bennett goes Christmas caroling around the neighborhood, but the residents stay in their homes to avoid him.
7	7	"The Parrot Trap"	Shelley Jensen	Alison Brown	January 13, 2013	109	2.82
Ellen has never been a dog person and Avery is concerned that she does not bond with Stan, so she decides to obtain a pet of her own, a talking Blue-and-yellow macaw named Lucy, which the family hates. Guest star: Kimmy Caruso as Rebecca
8	8	"The Bone Identity"	Neal Israel	Jim Hope	January 27, 2013	105	3.15
After overhearing Avery talk about Stan's secret, Karl Fink, the family's neighbor (L.J. Benet) starts spying on Stan and the rest of the family to find out his secret. Meanwhile, Bennett tries to get Chloe to stop wearing her magician's outfit to school by wearing it himself so it is not special. It eventually works. Guest stars: LJ Benet as Karl Fink, Kayla Maisonet as Lindsay
9	9	"Stan Stops Talking"	Shelley Jensen	John Peaslee	February 17, 2013	115	4.26
Avery, Tyler and Chloe are utterly shocked when they discover that Stan is not talking anymore, so they try different methods in order to get him to speak.
10	10	"Dog Loses Girl"	Neal Israel	Chad Gervich	February 24, 2013	107	3.39
Bennett and Ellen go out and leave Tyler to watch Chloe; Tyler in turn leaves Chloe with Avery in order to go on a date with Nikki. Avery leaves Chloe with Stan to get a signed copy of a book and Stan loses Chloe. Guest stars: Denyse Tontz as Nikki Ortiz, LJ Benet as Karl Fink
11	11	"Stan-ing Guard"	Shelley Jensen	Michael B. Kaplan	March 24, 2013	110	2.81
Bennett, Ellen, and Avery all have a different idea of watching the house after overhearing a stranger that was actually Stan on the computer at night. Avery tries to turn Stan into a guard dog as her own way.
12	12	"Freaky Fido"	Neal Israel	Judd Pillott	April 7, 2013	111	2.99
When Avery realizes that her family and teacher thinks that she is not fun, she decides to prove them wrong by making a movie with her family called "Freaky Fido", but not everyone ends up having fun shooting the film. Guest star: Denyse Tontz as Nikki Ortiz
13	13	"Guess Who's a Cheerleader"	Shelley Jensen	Richard Gurman	April 28, 2013	112	3.19
Stan voices his concerns about Avery's lack of loyalty after she makes the cheerleading squad and begins to distance herself from Lindsay, Avery's best friend who is not liked by the cheerleading squad. Near the end of the episode, Avery joins the cheerleading group with the condition that they accept Lindsay. Meanwhile, Bennett decides to go on a fishing trip with Tyler to have a little father-son bonding. However it backfires and to make matters worse, Bennett and Tyler get trapped in the shed with a bucket of fish. Although they eventually escape from the shed, the smelly odor of the rotting fish sticks to Tyler so he will send hot cheerleader chicks away holding their noses and attract cats. Guest star: Kayla Maisonet as Lindsay
14	14	"Crimes of the Art"	Shelley Jensen	Amy Pittman	May 5, 2013	118	3.45
When Tyler enters the same art competition as Avery, Avery accuses him of only doing it for the money and accidentally destroys his masterpiece. Chloe and Stan work on their painting. Also, Karl decides to paint Ellen's beauty into his painting. But, Chloe and Stan win the contest with an entry called "Modern Arf", where Chloe paints Stan with random colors. Guest star: LJ Benet as Karl Fink
15	15	"Avery's First Crush"	Neal Israel	Jim Hope	May 12, 2013	113	2.75
Avery has a huge crush on a boy named Dustin Pitt, and in order to spend time with him she enlists the help of Tyler and Nikki, who in turn wants her to help him spend time with Nikki. Avery and Dustin end up watching a movie together and later with Stan's help, Avery tells Dustin she likes him. Dustin likes her back and asks her out. Guest stars: Denyse Tontz as Nikki Ortiz, Noah Harden as Dustin Pitt
16	16	"The Truck Stops Here"	Rich Correll	Steve Jarczak; Shawn Thomas	June 8, 2013	114	2.13
Tyler gets a summer job on a food truck and decides he would rather have his own truck than finish school. Guest star: Larry Joe Campbell as The Hawk
17	17	"Avery's First Breakup"	David Kendall	Judd Pillot	June 23, 2013	122	3.15
Avery's boyfriend, Dustin dumps her and Stan tells her that she should go to her mother for help. Guest star: Larry Joe Campbell as The Hawk
18	18	"A New Baby?"	Shelley Jensen	Alison Brown	July 14, 2013	116	3.18
Avery, Tyler and Chloe react to the news when Stan overhears a conversation between Ellen and Bennett about a possible new addition to the family. Bennett has the chance to become a public speaker and be rich, but the children ruin it all thinking they will have a new baby. Guest star: Brian George as Monty Cathcart
19	19	"Stan Talks to Gran"	Joel Zwick	Kristin Layne Tucker	July 21, 2013	119	2.30
After Grandma hears Stan talking while babysitting the children, she begins to think that she is going crazy, prompting the children to decide whether or not they should share Stan's secret with Grandma. Guest star: Stephanie Faracy as Grandma James
20	20	"Avery's Wild Party"	Eric Dean Seaton	John Peaslee	July 28, 2013	121	3.05
To help land an internship with a City Official, Avery agrees to throw a party at her house for the official's demanding daughter, while keeping it a secret from her parents, for they are attending a sleepover at the park with Chloe and her Healthy Muffins Troop. Guest stars: LJ Benet as Karl Fink, Dara Sisterhen as Brie
21	21	"My Parents Posted What?!"	David Kendall	Michael B. Kaplan	August 11, 2013	120	3.01
Bennett and Ellen discover Avery's secret online 'Buddy Bop' account. When they try to shut Avery's account down, they accidentally post an embarrassing video. Stan must face his past and do the tango with Chloe, to win an animal talent show. In the end, Stan loses the talent show to a talking dog. Guest stars: Kayla Maisonet as Lindsay, Camden Angelis as Ivy, Richard Olate as himself, Nicholas Smith as himself Note: This is a special episode on Internet safety.
22	22	"Stan's Old Owner"	Shelley Jensen	Chad Gervich	August 25, 2013	117	3.24
Stan's former owner, Ian, arrives from Spokane, Washington, to reclaim Stan. He tells Stan he found his original family and they can all talk, too, so Stan has to choose between his old family and his new family. Guest stars: Kayla Maisonet as Lindsay, Adam Kulbersh as Ian Calloway, Keli Daniels as Kelly Stewart, D.C. Douglas as Rick Stewart, Ella Anderson as Darcy Stewart

=== Season 2 (2013–14) ===
No. overall	No. in season	Title	Directed by	Written by	Original release date	Prod. code	U.S. viewers (millions)
23	1	"Too Short"	Shelley Jensen	Michael B. Kaplan	September 20, 2013	201	2.99
Avery is embarrassed when everyone else at school has had a growth spurt except her. Bennett gives Tyler a haircut, which makes Tyler embarrassed because his hair is too short. Avery has a crush on a boy named Wes and believes he will not talk to her because of her height. Later on, Avery confronts him and tells him that he is at fault if he is not talking to her, and Tyler reveals his hair. Guest stars: Kayla Maisonet as Lindsay, Danielle Soibelman as Max, Peyton Meyer as Wes Manning
24	2	"Good Girl Gone Bad"	Shelley Jensen	Richard Gurman	September 27, 2013	202	2.37
Avery is upset her friends never told her about "Ditch Day" because they think of her as too square, so she yarn-bombs a previous principal's statue. Guest stars: Kayla Maisonet as Lindsay, Danielle Soibelman as Max, Ella Anderson as Darcy Stewart, JD Cullum as Mr. Carver, Teala Dunn as Dab
25	3	"Howloween"	Shelley Jensen	Steve Jarczak; Shawn Thomas	October 4, 2013	203	3.45
Avery's family decides to throw a Halloween party, and Avery is upset when her parents will not let her attend a different party. Avery does not help with planning, and the party turns out to be a bore. Chloe, Tyler, Bennett and Ellen fight over who can wear what costume for Halloween, while Stan's costume is a robot, and he talks with Bennett and Ellen. Later, Avery finds out that Wes and his friends are coming to the party and she helps out, along with wearing a costume. When Wes arrives, Tyler accidentally pulls a prank on Avery, and Avery ends up taking it as a joke and ends up talking with Wes. Guest stars: Kayla Maisonet as Lindsay, Danielle Soibelman as Max, Peyton Meyer as Wes Manning
26	4	"Stan Makes His Mark"	Shelley Jensen	Jim Hope	October 11, 2013	204	2.91
Stan makes a video of himself talking to make sure everybody will remember him when he dies, and the children try to cover it up. Meanwhile, Ellen gets a job as the assistant vet at the animal hospital. Bennett tries to tell her that she should not get the job, because she's anything but an animal person. Guest star: Rizwan Manji as Dr. Young
27	5	"Tyler Gets a Grillfriend" "Tyler Gets a Girlfriend"	Shelley Jensen	Alison Brown	November 1, 2013	205	3.21
The truck where Tyler works has a new owner, Gator. Tyler finds an interest in Gator's daughter, Emily. However, Gator does not approve. Meanwhile, Stan becomes a therapist, inspired by Bennett, and Chloe comes to see him after a falling out with Avery, because of Chloe and Ellen spending a lot of time together. Gator decides after hearing Ellen and Avery talk about independence that Emily may date whoever she wants to date. Guest stars: Stephanie Hodge as Gator, Kathryn Newton as Emily
28	6	"Don't Karl Us, We'll Karl You"	Shelley Jensen	Judd Pillot	November 22, 2013	206	2.78
After Tyler, Avery, and Chloe are annoyed with Karl being at their house, talking with their parents, pranking them, and worried he'll find out Stan's secret, they send Stan to find something to make Karl look bad in front of their parents. Stan finds out that Karl is actually Walter Perkins, a secret admirer of Ellen. Chloe then says she is Walter Perkins, because she wanted to do something nice for Ellen. Then, Karl sends a gift that is a prank of a water ballon filling with water and exploding to send to Ellen, but then they reveal that Karl is actually Walter Perkins. Ellen and Bennet then end their friendship with Karl. When the children send Stan over to his shed to find out his next move, they discover that Karl is genuinely upset about it, as they were the closest family he ever had, so they get Bennett and Ellen to forgive him. Guest star: LJ Benet as Karl Fink
29	7	"Twas the Fight Before Christmas"	Victor Gonzalez	Richard Day	December 6, 2013	207	3.07
Ellen's critical and arrogant sister, Sigourney, is on a holiday trip and decides to visit Ellen's family when her connecting flight to Hawaii is delayed six hours. Ellen dislikes Sigourney, who frequently criticizes Ellen and causes her to cry, so Avery devises a plan to have a perfect Christmas, giving Sigourney nothing to criticize. Meanwhile, Stan has secretly taken in a stray dog named Sparky so the dog will not be alone on Christmas. When Sparky tracks mud into the house, Sigourney slips on it and injures her back. She decides to cancel her trip and stay with the family for the next three days to recover. Avery convinces Ellen she can get through three days without crying over Sigourney's criticisms. When Sparky ruins the family's Christmas dinner, Ellen laughs at the situation and admits to Sigourney that the family does not have perfect Christmases but that she enjoys the holiday despite imperfections. Sigourney begins crying and reveals that she faked her injury so she could be with them, as she does not have a family like Ellen's. Sigourney is delighted when the family decides to give Sparky to her as a Christmas present. Guest star: Cynthia Watros as Sigourney
30	8	"Lost in Stanslation"	Shelley Jensen	Greg Lisbe	January 10, 2014	208	2.38
When Avery agrees to tutor Wes in Spanish so she can hang out with him, she needs to learn Spanish herself first. So she enlists Nikki to tell her what to say through an earpiece that she'll be wearing, but when Nikki and Tyler start arguing, Avery starts repeating everything they say. After the tutoring, Wes asks Avery in Spanish if it is inappropriate for him to ask his tutor out on a date and Avery replies in Spanish "yes, very much", not knowing what it meant. Then Nikki returns and Avery asks her what Wes asked. In the end, it is revealed that Nikki is jealous of Tyler and Emily. Guest stars: Denyse Tontz as Nikki Ortiz, Peyton Meyer as Wes, Kathryn Newton as Emily
31	9	"Avery B. Jealous"	Victor Gonzalez	Alison Brown	January 24, 2014	209	2.90
After Avery blows her chance with Wes after the Spanish tutoring in "Lost In Stanslation", she finds out he asked Lindsay on a date instead, to which she says yes. Avery asks Lindsay to tell Wes she changed her mind, but Lindsay refuses when Avery takes the lead on their presentation on Susan B. Anthony. Guest stars: Kayla Maisonet as Lindsay, Danielle Sobielman as Max, Peyton Meyer as Wes
32	10	"Love Ty-Angle"	Shelley Jensen	Michael B. Kaplan	February 21, 2014	211	2.41
After Tyler's friendship with Nikki begins to interfere with his relationship with his girlfriend Emily, he has to make a tough choice between the two. Ellen cat-sits for a friend, forcing her, Bennett, and Avery to try to keep Stan from finding out that there is a cat in the house. Once he does, he is shocked to find that he might actually like the cat, but at the end of the episode, he goes back to disliking cats. Guest stars: Denyse Tontz as Nikki Ortiz, Kathryn Newton as Emily
33	11	"Stan Runs Away"	Alex Zamm	Michael B. Kaplan	February 28, 2014	213	2.80
The children let Chloe pick the family trip, but Stan tricks her into choosing camping. The children scold Stan for what he did and why he did it and get into a major argument, which causes Stan to run away with Robert to try to find a new family. The children try to find Stan when they do not have much time, and they end up having to go home. They then sneak out of their home, and they find Stan before the dog is taken to New Mexico. Guest star: Brendan Hunt as Bill
34	12	"I Want My Nikki Back, Nikki Back, Nikki Back"	Shelley Jensen	Jim Hope	March 7, 2014	212	2.04
Nikki is upset that Tyler did not want to be with her first and does not know if he can trust her, so she ignores him, which makes Tyler upset. Tyler finally discovers the truth; that he has always wanted to be with Nikki. Avery gives Nikki advice instead of Tyler, insisting that she "dodged a bullet", but then realizes that Tyler is not moving on like she thought, so she tries to fix their relationship problem. Guest star: Denyse Tontz as Nikki Ortiz
35	13	"Avery-Body Dance Now"	Roger Christiansen	Richard Day	March 21, 2014	215	2.38
Wes asks Avery to the dance, which she accepts. It turns out Avery cannot dance, but her arch-nemesis, Karl, offers to teach her how to dance. Karl tells Wes that he is going to the dance with Avery, when in fact he is not. Wes gets mad at Avery, causing her to leave the dance. Lindsay and Max confront Wes and try to figure out what happened. Guest stars: LJ Benet as Karl Fink, Kayla Maisonet as Lindsay, Danielle Soibelman as Max, Peyton Meyer as Wes Manning
36	14	"The Green-Eyed Monster"	Sean Mulcahy	Greg Lisbe	April 4, 2014	218	2.39
Stan accidentally gets Avery and Wes to break up and he tries to get them back together by tricking Wes by telling him that he is Avery's cousin, so Avery tries to have a cast with Tyler in it. Afterward, Wes accepts Avery's apology. Guest star: Peyton Meyer as Wes Manning
37	15	"Who's Training Who?"	Victor Gonzalez	Richard Gurman	April 11, 2014	N/A	2.99
Ellen hires an animal trainer, Cherri Pickford, to train Stan, but Cherri fails to do so. She leaves, and Ellen and Bennett make Stan an outside dog. Chloe, Tyler, and Avery disagree and stay outside with Stan; they then stay outside all night with Stan. When their parents will not agree with them, they try to publicly humiliate their parents. Then, Ellen and Bennett come outside and force them to come inside. They call back Cherri and make Stan listen to her. Ellen and Bennett then make Stan an inside dog again. Special guest star: Leigh-Allyn Baker as Cheri
38	16	"Love, Loss and a Beanbag Toss" "Love, Lose and a Beanbag Toss"	Shelley Jensen	Alison Brown	May 16, 2014	219	2.65
Avery does not understand why Wes is avoiding her, but she later learns that Wes is moving away, which breaks Avery's heart. Guest stars: Peyton Meyer as Wes Manning, Kayla Maisonet as Lindsay, Danielle Soibelman as Max, Teala Dunn as Dab
39	17	"How I Met Your Brother and Sister"	Bruce Leddy	Natasha Gray	June 13, 2014	217	2.54
For Bennett and Ellen's anniversary, the children have a do-over wedding for them. Avery and Tyler tell Stan the story of how they first met and the story of the first wedding. Guest star: Eamonn Roche as Minister
40	18	"Will Sing for Food Truck"	Shelley Jensen	Steve Jarczak; Shawn Thomas	June 20, 2014	216	2.52
Due to business being slow at the food truck, Tyler gets let go. To get back the customers and his job, he asks Avery to record a song, which she agrees to since singing is her dream. The song is used in a commercial and is very popular, but when she gets criticized for her singing, she starts having second thoughts. However, she agrees to sing one last time, live, in order for Tyler to get his job back. Guest star: Stephanie Hodge as Gator Song featured: "Truck Stops Here" by G. Hannelius
41	19	"Stuck in the Mini with You"	Bruce Leddy	Amy Pittman	July 18, 2014	214	N/A
On a long road trip, Avery and Ellen get stuck in the snow, while Bennett gets sick and charged with getting Chloe to her dance recital.
42	20	"Pod People from Pasadena"	Sean Mulcahy	Jay Dyer	July 25, 2014	220	2.76
Avery learns she has been selected to create a float for her town's parade and is excited to spend some quality time with her father to build it.
43	21	"The Mutt and the Mogul"	Roger Christiansen	Steve Jarczak; Shawn Thomas	August 1, 2014	221	1.95
A billionaire tries to get Stan to star in a commercial, but Stan does not want to because someone may find out his secret. Avery and Tyler come up with a plan to stop the billionaire from getting Stan, but Ellen and Bennett walk in just before he leaves. Guest stars: Charles Shaughnessy as Tom Fairbanks, Mary Pat Gleason as Carol, Michael Kagan as Emerson, Hans Holsen as Doug
44	22	"Stan Gets Schooled"	Rob Schiller	Amy Pittman	August 15, 2014	223	2.55
After Stan sneaks into Avery and Tyler's school because he wanted to go, after how Avery made it sound so fun, she suggests using a robot to go to school. Guest stars: Kayla Maisonet as Lindsay, Danielle Soibelman as Max, Griffin Kunitz as Mason, Fred Stoller as Mr. Starr
45	23	"Karl Finds Out Stan's Secret"	Alex Zamm	Jim Hope	August 22, 2014	222	2.23
Avery, Tyler and Chloe discover Karl has been spying on them and knows Stan can talk. Guest star: LJ Benet as Karl Fink
46	24	"The Kids Find Out Stan Blogs"	Sean Mulcahy	Michael B. Kaplan	September 12, 2014	224	1.70
After Stan stays up all night watching Ellen make a fool of herself, he falls asleep, forgetting to turn off the computer. Avery, Tyler, and Chloe look at the computer, finding out that Stan blogs. Meanwhile, Bennett tells Ellen the big news about his book being published. Bennett keeps bragging about how weird his publisher eats, and Stan mistakenly tells Bennett's publisher about it, which gets Bennett's publisher to quit writing Bennett's books. Bennett says if he does not get the publisher back, then they'll lose their home, so Stan writes that he'll stop blogging and talking to Bennett's publisher, even if it means he has to give up his secret, but the publisher had eye surgery and cannot see. Avery, Tyler, and Chloe try to stop Stan; Bennett's publisher hears them talking to Stan, but thinks they are talking to him; he then thanks the children and rehires himself. Guest star: Randy J. Goodwin as Barry Barnes

=== Season 3 (2014–15) ===
No. overall	No. in season	Title	Directed by	Written by	Original release date	Prod. code	U.S. viewers (millions)
47	1	"Guess Who Gets Expelled?"	Shelley Jensen	Michael B. Kaplan	September 26, 2014	301	2.19
Avery makes a senior prank for Tyler to do and it eventually makes both Tyler and Avery expelled. Guest stars: Kelly Perine as Principal Lawson, Kayla Maisonet as Lindsay, Danielle Soibelman as Max, Griffin Kunitz as Mason
48	2	"Howloween 2: The Final Reckoning"	Shelley Jensen	Jim Hope	October 2, 2014	302	1.97
Stan promises Avery that he will keep quiet while he watches a haunted movie on her laptop in her room, but at one stage yells, "Get out of the house!". Hearing this, Bennett thinks there is a burglar in the house, but Tyler jumps into the conversation and says the house is haunted. Bennett does not believe him, but gullible Ellen starts to show fear. Avery, Tyler, Chloe and Stan work together to make the house appear haunted to prove this.
49	3	"Avery Schools Tyler"	Joel Zwick	Harry Hannigan	October 17, 2014	303	1.20
After Tyler is offered a big opportunity, Avery puts Tyler to the test to see if he's ready. Later, Tyler gets in, but he has to practice another semester, which he does not like. Guest star: Dexter Masland as Red Burnett
50	4	"Stan Falls in Love"	Shelley Jensen	Steve Jarczak; Shawn Thomas	November 21, 2014	304	1.71
Stan develops a crush on a dog named Princess, but he has to figure out how to avoid her snobby, mean owner Heather Collins, who is also Avery's new schoolmate and the family's new neighbor's daughter. Guest stars: Kayla Maisonet as Lindsay, Danielle Soibelman as Max, Griffin Kunitz as Mason, Brighid Fleming as Heather
51	5	"Avery vs. Teacher"	Shelley Jensen	Debby Wolfe	November 28, 2014	305	2.06
Avery gets a bad grade in life skills class after not seeing a point in the class, even though her assignments are always perfect. Meanwhile, Stan visits the vet (Tyler tricks him into thinking they're going out for some "toe-tasting"). Guest stars: Rizwan Manji as Dr. Young, Kelly Holden Bashar as Solange Dupont, Kayla Maisonet as Lindsay, Danielle Soibelman as Max
52	6	"Stan Steals Christmas"	Shelley Jensen	Amy Pittman	December 5, 2014	306	1.97
While writing his blog, Stan reminisces with Chloe about the family's latest Christmas, in which he tried convincing the children that the holiday is about spending time with family and not about receiving presents. When the children realize that Stan hid the presents in the middle of the night to teach them the purpose of Christmas, they convince him the gifts must be recovered before Ellen and Bennett find out. Stan buried the presents in the park, but has trouble remembering where exactly. In addition, the park is closed for a private family Christmas party, so the children must pose as members of the McCorkin family to stay and dig for their gifts. Meanwhile, in the backyard, Bennett works to assemble a trampoline as a Christmas present. He insists to Ellen that there was no need to pay to have the trampoline assembled, but when he has difficulty putting it together himself, he secretly hires someone to finish the project. Meanwhile, Chloe and Tyler take turns helping Ellen cook Christmas dinner, and to distract her and Bennett from noticing the presents are missing. Eventually, Stan remembers he buried the presents beneath other presents in the park that are for children as part of a charity toy drive, and Avery, Tyler and Chloe decide to donate their gifts to the children. Guest star: Lyle Kanouse as Ivan McCorkin
53	7	"Avery Makes Over Max"	Shelley Jensen	Jessica Kaminsky	January 9, 2015	307	1.86
Avery gets more into designing clothes and she wants to make some for other people. She makes a cute outfit for Lindsey and Avery wants to make one for Max, but Max does not want to wear any. Max tells Avery she does not like her designs, and Avery is devastated, arguing afterward with Max, who tells her she needs a better friend and leaves. Avery then apologizes to Max, and they make up. Meanwhile, after finding out that Ellen has been secretly putting kale in his dinner, Bennett tries to make Ellen try new things, of which she does not approve. Stan tries to win over Princess by changing his look, with Tyler and Chloe's help, but after he sees a gopher, he messes it up, and Princess surprisingly likes him this way. At the end of this episode, Stan writes in his blog that Bennett and Ellen learned not to change people without them knowing, Avery learned not to change people when they know about it, and he learned that Princess likes him after all, even without him trying to change himself. Guest stars: Kayla Maisonet as Lindsay, Danielle Soibelman as Max
54	8	"Avery Dreams of Kissing Karl"	Shelley Jensen	Michael B. Kaplan	January 16, 2015	308	1.68
Avery is worried about a recent dream of her and Karl sharing a kiss. Stan helps Avery get over her dream, by inviting Karl over. Avery keeps having the same dream, so she goes to Bennett for help, Bennett says if she keeps having the dream, she must really like Karl, Avery then screams and runs right out of the room. Later, Ellen gives advice to Avery and tells her the first kiss she had with Bennett and that it was beautiful, Avery then invites Karl to get over the dream by trying to see if there is a spark between them. Guest star: LJ Benet as Karl Fink
55	9	"Dog on a Catwalk"	Shelley Jensen	Jim Hope	February 6, 2015	309	1.44
Stan enters the Dog show to be closer to Princess. When he wins, Heather and Princess leave and Stan is upset. At the house, Heather knocks on the door and ask Avery to make cute designs for Princess, but Avery rejects her, but then Stan comes up with an idea for Avery to work with Heather, so he could frolic with his girlfriend. When Heather constantly exasperates Avery, Stan feels Avery's pain and runs Heather out of the house. Guest stars: Brighid Fleming as Heather, Alec Mapa as Emcee
56	10	"Guess Who's a Cheater"	Joel Zwick	Debby Wolfe	February 20, 2015	310	1.97
Tyler is accused of cheating and he goes to extreme measures to prove his innocence. Meanwhile, Avery, Max, and Lindsey get a boyfriend, only to find out that their new beau is dating all three of them. The three girls get revenge on him by making him eat a lot of things at the local food fair. Guest stars: Kayla Maisonet as Lindsay, Danielle Soibelman as Max, Kelly Perine as Principal Lawson, Logan Miller as Erik, Kalama Epstein as Brian
57	11	"Stan's New BFF"	Jody Margolin Hahn	Steve Jarczack; Shawn Thomas	March 6, 2015	311	2.14
Stan's been spending way too much time with Karl lately, which leads to him missing Avery's birthday, so he lies to her as to why he missed her party out of guilt. Realizing his mistake, Stan decides to make it up to Avery by doing a musical number with Karl's help as a late birthday present to her, however Avery discovers that Stan lied to her about why he missed her party when he accidentally lets it slip. Also, Avery accuses Stan of liking Karl more than her as he was going over to his house for a sleepover to finish working his late gift for her. Hurt, Avery calls Stan a bad friend and kicks him out of her room. After performing her late birthday gift, Stan and Karl discover that Avery spied on them when she shows them a painting she made of them doing their number. In a flashback, Avery secretly followed Stan to Karl's place where she saw them working on the number as a gift for her, and realizes how wrong she was to be harsh towards him. Avery apologies to Stan for not trusting him and calling him a bad friend, and he also apologizes to her for lying. In the end, Avery and Karl become friends. Guest stars: LJ Benet as Karl Fink, Dexter Masland as Red Burnett
58	12	"Stan Sleep Talks"	David Kendall	Harry Hannigan	March 26, 2015	313	1.72
When Tyler and Avery notice that Stan is saying "groom" in his sleep, they worry his secret will be exposed. Things get worse when he starts sleepwalking and saying "doghouse" and later "princess." Avery thinks Stan is stressed out about Princess and needs to break up with her. Later, Stan realizes what's going on and says that he was doing the opposite. He then knows what he must do, so he proposes to Princess and she accepts, meaning that they're engaged. Guest star: Griffin Kunitz as Mason
59	13	"Stan Gets Married"	Rob Schiller	Jessica Kaminsky	April 17, 2015	312	1.83
Stan is about to get married, so to pay for everything, the wedding is submitted to the Wacky Jackie Show, a web series which stars the title character who uses her money to entertain herself. Guest stars: Olivia Holt as Wacky Jackie, LJ Benet as Karl Fink
60	14	"Guess Who Becomes President"	Shelley Jensen	Loni Steele Sothand	April 24, 2015	314	1.80
Avery is running for class president when she realizes that no one else is running. So, she asks Max to do it instead because she does not care. However, things take a big turn when Max is winning and Avery is not. Guest stars: Kayla Maisonet as Lindsay, Danielle Soibelman as Max
61	15	"Stan Has Puppies"	Victor Gonzalez; Alex Zamm	Jim Hope; Michael B. Kaplan	May 8, 2015	315/316	2.19
Karl announces that Princess is pregnant and Stan will soon be a father. However, Heather will not let Stan be anywhere near Princess for the birth of their puppies, so the children come up with a plan to get Stan to view his puppies being born. The plan involves the children dressing up and pretending to be part of Heather's family. Once they get to the area that Princess is having the puppies, they find that Heather is waiting outside the door. When Karl arrives, Avery sees that Heather has a massive crush on him, so she takes advantage of it and sits the two down to flirt. Finally, the puppies are born, and Stan names them Freddy and Gracie. Heather then wants to give away the puppies, so the kids try to convince their parents to adopt them. They succeed eight weeks later; however, Ian (from "Stan's Old Owner") has already bought them, and Stan risks anything to get them back. Guest stars: LJ Benet as Karl Fink, Adam Kulbersh as Ian Calloway, Griffin Kunitz as Mason, Aaron Kunitz as Jason, Brighid Fleming as Heather, Anjali Bhimani as Receptionist, Ruth Williamson as Gloria
62	16	"You're Not My Sister Anymore"	Joel Zwick	Jessica Kaminsky	June 12, 2015	317	1.70
Avery and Chloe get into a fight after Chloe discovers that Avery is using her to get closer to a boy she likes. Guest stars: Emery Kelly as Dax, Mckenna Grace as Jules
63	17	"The Puppies Talk"	Joel Zwick	Steve Jarczak; Shawn Thomas	June 19, 2015	318	1.76
After Stan attempts to get Gracie and Freddy to say their first words many times, Gracie finally says "Dada", and Stan and the kids get excited, but know that Gracie's secret getting out will have the same effect as Stan's secret getting out. Ellen soon hears Gracie talking, makes a video, posts it on the Internet, and soon, she and Gracie are invited to be on live TV. When the children discover the news, they must find a way to stop Ellen before the secret is exposed. At the end of the episode, Freddy begins talking as well. Guest stars: Tyler Poelle as Graham Cavanaugh, Deborah S. Craig as Leslie Lindemulder
64	18	"Guess Who's Dating Karl"	Jody Margolin Hahn	Harry Hannigan	July 17, 2015	320	1.63
Max starts to date Karl, but when they break up, Avery and Lindsay try to get them back together. Guest stars: Kayla Maisonet as Lindsay, Danielle Soibelman as Max, LJ Benet as Karl Fink
65	19	"Murder of the Ornamental Dress"	Joel Zwick	Kevin Engelking; Sarah Jeanne Terry	July 24, 2015	319	1.95
Avery's dress gets destroyed, and she tries to find out who did it. Guest star: LJ Benet as Karl Fink
66	20	"Stan Rescues His Princess"	Regan Burns	Debby Wolfe	August 7, 2015	321	1.61
When Heather and Princess will be gone at a special school for a month, Stan keeps taking Princess away so he will keep his family together. Guest star: Brighid Fleming as Heather
67	21	"Cat with a Blog"	Jonathan Judge	Amy Pittman	August 21, 2015	322	2.01
After he accidentally leaves the front door open, allowing raccoons to come in and ruin the family's new couch, a guilty Stan wishes to be a cat instead of a dog. His wish comes true, but he sees that adopting a cat will let major problems occur within the family. Guest star: Steve Valentine as Ralph
68	22	"Avery Starts Driving"	Jonathan Judge	Jim Hope	September 18, 2015	323	1.79
Tyler offers to help Avery when she is nervous about driving. Meanwhile, Chloe fears that she won't be "the cute one" as she grows up, while Stan looks up to Bennett to help with a conflict between Freddy and Gracie. Guest star: Jeff Doucette as Phil Trummer
69	23	"Stan's Secret Is Out"	Shelley Jensen	Michael B. Kaplan	September 25, 2015	324	2.15
Bennett and Ellen finally discover Stan and the puppies' secret. After Stan accidentally speaks in front of Karl's father, Colonel Fink, the U.S. Space Command's Secret Alien Division takes away the family, and Stan plans to escape from them by making them think he and the puppies stopped talking, but their plan backfires and they are followed. Stan then devises another plan to reveal his secret to the world, believing that the government will leave him alone if he becomes famous. Karl tells the family that Stan should talk on live television to reveal the secret. The secret is revealed during a live awards show, and Stan becomes a star, no longer needing to worry about getting taken away and experimented on ever again. Guest stars: LJ Benet as Karl Fink, Adam Kulbersh as Ian Calloway, Tyler Poelle as Graham Cavanaugh, Daran Norris as Colonel Fink
