= Oblivious =

Oblivious may refer to:

- Obliviousness, a mental state
- Oblivious (British TV series), a hidden camera comedy game show, 2001–2003
- Oblivious (American game show)
- Oblivious (film), a 2001 short film directed by Ozgur Uyanik
- "Oblivious" (Aztec Camera song), 1983
- "Oblivious" (Kalafina song), 2008
- Re/oblivious, a 2008 remix mini-album by Kalafina

== See also ==
- Oblivion (disambiguation)
