= A Yurt of One's Own =

- Shameless episode
- Episode no.: Season 6 Episode 9
- Directed by: Ruben Garcia
- Written by: Davey Holmes
- Cinematography by: Kevin McKnight
- Editing by: Mark Sadlek
- Original release date: March 13, 2016
- Running time: 54 minutes

Guest appearances
- Dermot Mulroney as Sean Pierce (special guest star); Steve Kazee as Gus Pfender (special guest star); Sherilyn Fenn as Queenie Slott (special guest star); Isidora Goreshter as Svetlana Milkovich; Emma Greenwell as Mandy Milkovich; Pat Healy as Lester; Jeff Kober as Jupiter; Oscar Nunez as Rick Encarnacion; Jayne Taini as Harmony; Angeline Appel as Brina; Jaylen Barron as Dominique Winslow; Julie Claire as Barbara Klifton

Episode chronology
← Previous "Be a Good Boy. Come For Grandma."	Next → "Paradise Lost"
- Shameless season 6

"A Yurt of One's Own" is the ninth episode of the sixth season of the American television comedy drama Shameless, an adaptation of the British series of the same name. It is the 69th overall episode of the series and was written by executive producer Davey Holmes and directed by Ruben Garcia. It originally aired on Showtime on March 13, 2016.

The series is set on the South Side of Chicago, Illinois, and depicts the poor, dysfunctional family of Frank Gallagher, a neglectful single father of six: Fiona, Phillip, Ian, Debbie, Carl, and Liam. He spends his days drunk, high, or in search of money, while his children need to learn to take care of themselves. In the episode, Frank joins Queenie in her commune, while Fiona tries to finalize her divorce with Gus. The episode marked the final appearance of Emma Greenwell in the series.

According to Nielsen Media Research, the episode was seen by an estimated 1.68 million household viewers and gained a 0.7 ratings share among adults aged 18–49. The episode received highly positive reviews from critics, who praised the return of Mandy, performances and ending.

== Plot ==
Frank (William H. Macy) is pursued by Lamar and his henchmen after having botched the cocaine shipment. Seeing that Queenie (Sherilyn Fenn) is taking Debbie (Emma Kenney) and Chuckie to her commune, Frank decides to join them to avoid the hitmen. At the commune, Frank is annoyed by the amount of chores and work he needs to do to stay there. He is further disgusted by the amount of orgies that take place, although Debbie is introduced to a maternity tent to relax. After realizing there is no marijuana, Frank prepares to leave, until Queenie shows him the commune is used to grow opium poppies.

Fiona (Emmy Rossum) tries to talk with Sean (Dermot Mulroney) over last night's events, but he is not interested in talking. She is visited by Gus (Steve Kazee), who has decided to finally get a divorce so he can properly date his girlfriend. They schedule a meeting for the following day, with Gus wanting his grandmother's ring back. Fiona visits the pawn shop to buy it back, but the owner has elevated the price to $6,000. She hires a cheap lawyer, Rick Encarnacion (Oscar Nunez), to help her case. With Carl (Ethan Cutkosky) having abandoned his criminal lifestyle, Dominique (Jaylen Barron) expresses interest in pursuing a romantic relationship with him; the two decide to have sex. Svetlana (Isidora Goreshter) is informed by a United States Citizenship and Immigration Services representative that she is facing possible deportation, as Mickey is now in prison. She considers moving to Kentucky, until Veronica (Shanola Hampton) suggests marrying her to prevent her deportation. Kevin (Steve Howey), however, refuses to let it happen.

Lip (Jeremy Allen White) continues to struggle with alcohol abuse, to the point that he takes a drink every time he serves one at a party. After passing out unconscious on a bench, Lip wakes up in the hospital, having been treated for alcohol poisoning. Ian (Cameron Monaghan) receives a call from Mandy (Emma Greenwell), who has left Kenyatta and now works as an escort; she requests for his help at a hotel. At the hotel, Ian discovers that Mandy had strangled a client to death after he abused her. As they are unable to take the body out without raising suspicions, Ian convinces her in calling the police and claim he had a stroke. Ian then takes Mandy to the Gallagher house to sleep; he opens up about his relationship with Caleb, concerned that the relationship will end due to his family and bipolar disorder. The following morning, Mandy says goodbye to Ian, and the two have an intimate discussion about growing up in the South Side. Lip returns home from the hospital, briefly running into Mandy as she leaves.

At Fiona's divorce hearing, Gus seeks a $15,000 settlement after Fiona does not return the ring. Fiona and Rick pressure Gus over his net total, but the meeting is interrupted by Sean, who reveals that he bought Gus' ring. Sean returns the ring to Gus, and then surprises Fiona by proposing to her, to which she gleefully accepts.

== Production ==
The episode was written by executive producer Davey Holmes and directed by Ruben Garcia. It was Holmes' seventh writing credit, and Garcia's first directing credit.

== Reception ==
=== Viewers ===
In its original American broadcast, "A Yurt of One's Own" was seen by an estimated 1.68 million household viewers with a 0.7 in the 18–49 demographics. This means that 0.7 percent of all households with televisions watched the episode. This was a 12% increase in viewership from the previous episode, which was seen by an estimated 1.50 million household viewers with a 0.6 in the 18–49 demographics.

=== Critical reviews ===
"A Yurt of One's Own" received highly positive reviews from critics. Myles McNutt of The A.V. Club gave the episode a "B+" grade and wrote, "Shameless is more on the verge of transition now than it's ever been, which is a positive development even if I'm girding myself for the fact that actual transition may be impossible with the show having at least a season left in the tank."

Leslie Pariseau of Vulture gave the episode a perfect 5 out of 5 star rating and wrote "The show is so ridiculous that what might seem absurd in another world is totally fair game in the land of the Gallaghers. But also, it's good at planting breadcrumbs that lead us toward the next episode. "A Yurt of One's Own" is a great example of this progressive build, each family member's path blossoming or decaying with the strange ebb and flow of Shameless's quirky rhythms."

Amanda Michelle Steiner of Entertainment Weekly wrote "In “A Yurt of One’s Own,” Fiona finally admits that she jumps from one guy to the next without taking a breath, a behavior that massively contributes to the overall mess that is her life. It was a surprising moment of self-reflection from her, but the clarity didn’t last long." Allyson Johnson of The Young Folks gave the episode a 6 out of 10 rating and wrote "I'm waiting for something to happen that makes sense within the show's universe that isn't just throwing characters into one tough situation after the other and waiting to see how they handle it. Mandy and Ian worked so well this week because it was based wholly on what we know of them, how they've grown and their relationship together. We need more character development."

David Crow of Den of Geek gave the episode a 4 star rating out of 5, and wrote, "after a good episode like this, maybe there is a reason they aren't allowed a full escape. Not when the give-and-take between mobility and backsliding is so entertaining." Paul Dailly of TV Fanatic gave the episode a 4.5 star rating out of 5, and wrote, ""A Yurt of One's Own" was a solid installment of this Showtime drama. Hopefully we get some more natural character progression for these characters as we approach the end of the season."
