= Wersching =

Wersching is a surname. Notable people with the name include:

- Annie Wersching (1977–2023), American actress
- Ray Wersching (born 1950), Austrian former placekicker in the NFL
