= Oblivion =

Oblivion may refer to:

== Film ==
- Oblivion (1994 film), an American space Western
- Oblivion (2013 film), an American post-apocalyptic science fiction film

== Literature ==
- Oblivion (Fabbri novel), 2007 testimonial novel by Edda Fabbri
- Oblivion (Power of Five), 2012 novel by Anthony Horowitz
- Oblivion (Stone novel), 1998 Bernice Summerfield/Doctor Who novel by Dave Stone
- Oblivion: Stories, 2004 story collection by David Foster Wallace

See also:

- Oblivion, 1999 book by Harry Maihafer about the disappearance of Richard Colvin Cox
- Oblivion, 2005 novel by Peter Abrahams
- Oblivion, 2015 play by Carly Mensch

== Music ==
=== Artists and labels ===
- Oblivion (metal band), an American band formed in 2007
- Oblivion (punk band), an American band 1988–2000
- Oblivion Records, an American record label 1972–1976
- Oblivion, a sub-label of the German record label SPV GmbH

=== Albums ===
- Oblivion (Utopia album), 1984
- Oblivion (Biff Bang Pow! album), 1987
- Oblivion, by D-Rok, or the title song, 1991
- Oblivion (Orphanage album), 1995
- Oblivion, by Redshift, 2004
- Oblivion (Kaliopi album) or the title song, 2009
- Oblivion EP, by Mastodon, or the title song (see below), 2009
- Oblivion (T-Pain album), 2017
- Oblivion (Smile Empty Soul album), 2018
- Oblivion, by Crematory, 2018
- Oblivion EP, by Ov Sulfur, 2021
- Oblivion!, EP by Sundara Karma, 2022

=== Songs ===
- Oblivion (Piazzolla), 1982
- "Oblivion", by Bud Powell from The Genius of Bud Powell, 1956
- "Oblivion" (Terrorvision song), 1994
- "Oblivion", by Mudhoney from Tomorrow Hit Today, 1998
- "Oblivion", by 30 Seconds to Mars from 30 Seconds to Mars, 2002
- "Oblivion", by Mors Principium Est from Inhumanity, 2003
- "Oblivion", by Suffocation from Suffocation, 2006
- "Oblivion" (Hastang song), 2007
- "Oblivion", by Wintersleep from Welcome to the Night Sky, 2007
- "Oblivion", by Brant Bjork and the Bros from Somera Sól, 2007
- "Oblivion" (Mastodon song), 2009
- "Oblivion", by Lacuna Coil from Shallow Life, 2009
- "Oblivion", by Patrick Wolf from The Bachelor, 2009
- "Oblivion", by Vektor from Black Future, 2009
- "Oblivion", by M. Pokora from Mise à jour, 2010
- "Oblivion", by Chelsea Grin from My Damnation, 2011
- "Oblivion" (Grimes song), 2012
- "Oblivion" (M83 song), 2013
- "Oblivion", by the Baptist Generals from Jackleg Devotional to the Heart, 2013
- "Oblivion" (Bastille song), 2014
- "Oblivion", by In Hearts Wake from Skydancer, 2015
- "Oblivion", by the Winery Dogs from Hot Streak, 2015
- "Oblivion (Creation)", by Jhené Aiko from Trip, 2017
- "Oblivion", by TheFatRat featuring Lola Blanc, 2017
- "Oblivion", by Fit for a King from Dark Skies, 2018
- "Oblivion", by Young the Giant from Mirror Master, 2018
- "Oblivion", by Labrinth featuring Sia from Imagination & the Misfit Kid, 2019
- "Oblivion", by Atreyu from Baptize, 2021
- "Oblivion', by Royal Blood from Typhoons, 2021
- "Oblivion", by W&W presents NWYR — Oblivion, 2023
- "Oblivion" (Phish song), 2024
- "Oblivion", by Lorna Shore from I Feel the Everblack Festering Within Me, 2025
- "Oblivion", by Tame Impala from Deadbeat, 2025
- "Oblivion", by Haste the Day from Dissenter, 2026

== Other uses ==
- The Elder Scrolls IV: Oblivion, a 2006 role-playing video game, sometimes referred to as simply "Oblivion"
  - The Elder Scrolls IV: Oblivion Remastered, a remaster of the video game released in 2025
- Eternal oblivion, the belief in the permanent cessation of one's consciousness upon death
- Nick Aldis (born 1986), British professional wrestler known as Oblivion in the UK television series Gladiators
- Oblivion (roller coaster), a roller coaster in England
- Oblivion: The Black Hole, a roller coaster in Italy

== See also ==
- Obliveon, a Canadian thrash metal band
- Ash heap of history
- Lethe, the river of oblivion in Greek mythology
- Oblivious (disambiguation)
