= Oscar Nunez =

American actor and comedian (born 1958)

Óscar Núñez
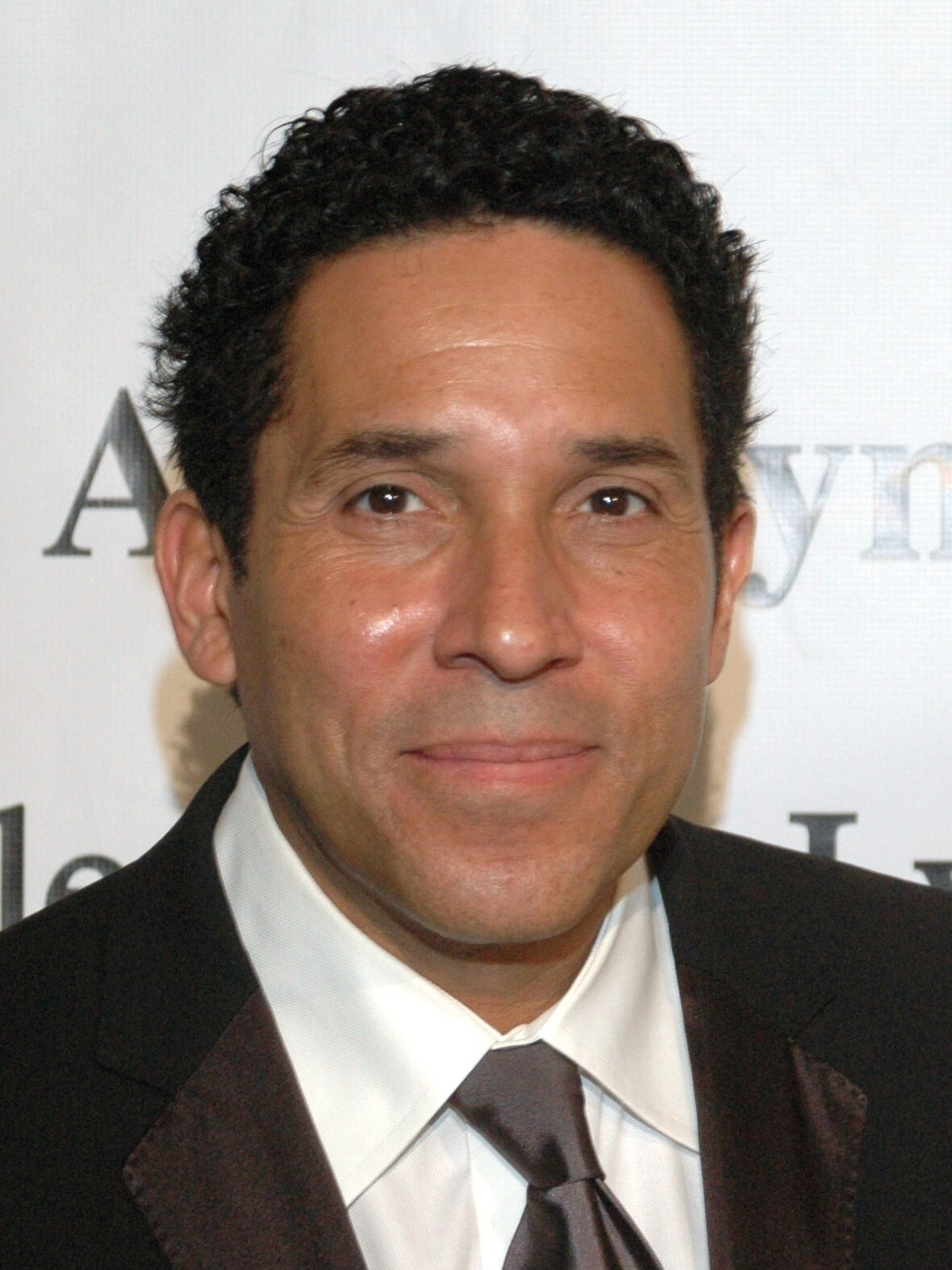
- Núñez in 2009
- Born: November 18, 1958 (age 68); Colón, Matanzas, Cuba
- Citizenship: United States
- Occupations: Actor, comedian
- Years active: 2000–present
- Spouse: Ursula Whittaker
- Children: 1

Óscar Núñez (born November 18, 1958), sometimes credited as Oscar Nunez, is a Cuban actor and comedian. He is best known for his role as the Dunder Mifflin accountant Oscar Martínez on NBC's The Office and its spin-off The Paper. The accolades he has received include two Screen Actors Guild Awards and a Daytime Emmy Awards, alongside a Primetime Emmy Award nomination.

He was a member of the Groundlings and later became a regular cast member on The Office. He also created and co-starred in the Comedy Central series Halfway Home in 2007, and in 2014 co-starred in the short-lived USA Network comedy series Benched. Since 2018, he has appeared in a series of State Farm commercials.

== Early life and education ==
Núñez was born in Colón, Cuba. Núñez's mother, a dentist, and father, a lawyer, attended school at the University of Havana while Fidel Castro was a student there. The family moved first to Caracas, Venezuela, in 1960 and then to the United States. His family moved to Boston when he was two years old and then to Union City, New Jersey, when he was four. He became a naturalized American citizen in 1964. He is bilingual, speaking English and Spanish. Núñez attended various colleges in New York, including the Fashion Institute of Technology and the Parsons School of Design. He became a certified dental technician after studying at the Magna Institute of Dental Technology.

== Career ==
Núñez started his comedy career in New York, performing over 300 shows with The Shock of the Funny theater company. The troupe was active in the East Village for several years. In addition to his work with Shock, Núñez appeared in theater in New York and Washington, D.C. before moving to Los Angeles in the mid 1990s. In L.A., he joined the Groundlings and performed in their Sunday Company. While with the Groundlings, he wrote and starred in a production called "Smooth Down There."

In 1997, Núñez graduated from the Warner Brothers Comedy Writer's Workshop. In 1999, he was a finalist in the ABC Latino Writers Project.

In 1998, he appeared on the game show Match Game but was not a winner. Núñez was Adam Carolla's stand-in on The Man Show.

Núñez's television credits include Malcolm in the Middle, 24, Curb Your Enthusiasm, Reno 911!, The District and Mad TV, in addition to his role on The Office. He won the 2007 Daytime Emmy for Outstanding Broadband Comedy for The Office: The Accountants. He was also the creator and executive producer of the Comedy Central series Halfway Home, in which he co-starred as the character Eulogio Pla.

His film credits include The Italian Job (as a security guard), Reno 911!: Miami, and When Do We Eat?. In 2009, Núñez played the role of Ramon, the caterer, stripper, soda jerk, and finally clergy performing the wedding ceremony in The Proposal. In 2012, Núñez played the role of Jose Baez, an attorney in the Lifetime movie Prosecuting Casey Anthony.

Núñez appeared as one of eight judges in the 2010 Miss USA Contest, posing a question about the Arizona undocumented immigrant law to Miss Oklahoma USA, Morgan Elizabeth Woolard. Núñez was booed by the audience before finishing the question; however he asked the audience to wait until he finished the question before they reacted. Although Woolard replied that she supports the law as a state rights issue, she added that she is against racial profiling.

In 2014, Núñez co-starred alongside Eliza Coupe and Jay Harrington in the short-lived USA Network comedy series Benched.

In 2016, Núñez appeared as a regular in the TBS comedy series, People of Earth.

In 2018, Núñez portrayed State Farm Insurance Agent Cole Perez in a series of commercials.

In July 2018, Núñez took on the role of Desi Arnaz, starring in the world premiere production of I Love Lucy: A Funny Thing Happened on the Way to the Sitcom, a behind-the-scenes stage comedy about I Love Lucy by Gregg Oppenheimer (son of series creator Jess Oppenheimer). Recorded before a live audience at the UCLA's James Bridges Theater, the L.A. Theatre Works production aired on public radio and has been released on Audio CD and as a downloadable mp3.

From 2019 to 2020, Núñez portrayed Assistant Principal Carlos Hernandez on the Netflix original comedy series Mr. Iglesias.

In 2025, Núñez began reprising his role as Oscar from The Office in its spinoff, The Paper, with the character now working at a Toledo, Ohio-based newspaper. The show began airing on Peacock on September 4 that year. On September 25, 2025, Nuñez appeared on Who Wants to Be a Millionaire alongside his co-star from The Office, Kate Flannery. He and Flannery went on to win the million-dollar top prize, becoming only the fourth celebrities and the seventeenth overall to do so, splitting $500,000 each for their respective charities, Philabundance and Planned Parenthood.

== Personal life ==
Núñez is married to actress Ursula Whittaker, and they have one child.

== Filmography ==
=== Film ===
List of film appearances, with year, title, and role shown
Year	Title	Role	Notes
2003	The Italian Job	Security Guard	
2005	When Do We Eat?	Santa Designer	
2007	Reno 911!: Miami	Jose Jose Jose	
2009	The Proposal	Ramone	
2011	Without Men	Priest Rafael	
2011	Language of a Broken Heart	Adam Lebowitz	
2014	Tell	Father Jack	
2015	The 33	Yonni Barrios	
2016	Miss Stevens	Principal Albert Alvarez	
2016	Mascots	Cesar Hidalgo	
2017	Baywatch	Councilman Rodriguez	
2022	The Lost City	Óscar	
2022	Raymond & Ray	Lawyer	
2022	Disenchanted	Edgar	
2022	A Christmas Mystery	Glenn Martin	
2023	Dashing Through the Snow	Conrad Harf	
2023	The Long Game	Principal Guerra	
2024	The School Duel	Governor Anthony Ramiro	
2026	Miss You, Love You	Minister	

=== Television ===
List of television appearances, with year, title, and role shown
Year	Title	Role	Notes
2000	Curb Your Enthusiasm	Male Parking Attendant	Episode: "Interior Decorator"
2001	Grounded for Life	Security Guard	Episode: "I Wanna Be Suspended"
2002–2003	Malcolm in the Middle	Ranch Hand	2 episodes
2003	Still Standing	Tim	Episode: "Still Hairdressing"
2003	Reno 911!	Captain Dwayne Hernandez	2 episodes
2003	24	Pilot	Episode: "Day 3: 6:00 p.m. - 7:00 p.m."
2005–2013	The Office	Oscar Martínez	Main cast; 189 episodes
2006	Reno 911!	"Spanish Mike" Alvarez	Episode: "Spanish Mike Returns"
2007	Halfway Home	Eulogio Pla	10 episodes
2010	Fred: The Movie	Lorenzo	Television film
2011–2012	Bob's Burgers	Cha-Cha / Pepe (voice)	2 episodes
2013	Prosecuting Casey Anthony	Jose Baez	Television film
2013	Family Tree	Discount Car Rental Agent	Episode: "Indians"
2013	It's Always Sunny in Philadelphia	Sudz Manager	Episode: "The Gang Tries Desperately to Win an Award"
2014	New Girl	Doug	Episode: "Cruise"
2014	Bad Teacher	Louis	Episode: "Life Science"
2014	Benched	Carlos	12 episodes
2015	Comedy Bang! Bang!	FBI Agent José González	Episode: "Maya Rudolph Wears a Black Skirt & Strappy Sandals"
2015	Adam Ruins Everything	Benny	Episode: "Adam Ruins Work"
2015	Romantically Speaking	Carl	Television film
2015–2019	Life in Pieces	Dr. James Changa	2 episodes
2016	Brooklyn Nine-Nine	Dr. Porp	Episode: "9 Days"
2016	iZombie	Stan Mendoza	Episode: "Eternal Sunshine of the Caffeinated Mind"
2016	Mutt & Stuff	Claude Puppe	Episode: "Lights! Camera! Bark!"
2016	Shameless	Rick Encarnacion	2 episodes
2016	Bad Internet	Jim	Episode: "Your Search History Revealed"
2016	Boondoggle	Eduardo	Episode: "The Course"
2016	Uncle Buck	Hector	Episode: "The Interrogation"
2016	Liv and Maddie	Mr. Beelick	Episode: "Sorta-Sisters-A-Rooney"
2016–2017	People of Earth	Father Doug	15 episodes
2018	American Housewife	Rupert the Cop	Episode: "Midlife Crisis"
2018	9-1-1	Guillermo	Episode: "Point of Origin"
2018	Worst Cooks in America: Celebrity Edition	Himself	5 episodes (season 13)
2018–2019	3Below: Tales of Arcadia	Sergeant Costas (voice)	9 episodes
2019	Those Who Can't	Johnson	Episode: "Yes We Scan"
2019	NCIS: Los Angeles	Lionel Fernandez	Episode: "No More Secrets"
2019	Where's Waldo?	Wizard Featherbeard (voice)	Episode: "Costa Rica... In Color!"
2019–2020	Mr. Iglesias	Assistant-Principal Carlos Hernandez	18 episodes
2020	Home Movie: The Princess Bride	Inigo Montoya	Episode: "Chapter Three: The Cliffs of Insanity"
2020	Social Distance	Miguel Villareal	Episode: "A Celebration of the Human Life Cycle"
2020	The Goldbergs	Ted	Episode: "Airplane!"
2021	No Activity	(voice)	Episode: "It's Not a Cult!"
2021	Zoey's Extraordinary Playlist	Dr. Tesoro	3 episodes
2022	The G Word with Adam Conover	Various	3 episodes
2022	Out of Office	X Fernandez	TV movie
2022–2025	Firebuds	Chef Fernando (voice)	12 episodes
2023	Lucky Hank	Dean Jacob Rose	6 episodes
2024	Solar Opposites	Oscar (voice)	Episode: "Live Die Repeat Device (Formerly Known as the Edge of Tomorrow Device)"
2025–present	The Paper	Oscar Martinez	Main role
2026	Rick and Morty	Antonio (voice)	Episode: "Rick Days, Seven Nights"
2026	Life, Larry and the Pursuit of Unhappiness	General Santa Anna	Episode: "Buzz"

== Awards and nominations ==
Year	Award	Category	Nominated work	Result
2007	Daytime Emmy Awards	Outstanding Broadband Program – Comedy	The Office: The Accountants	Won
2007	Screen Actors Guild Awards	Outstanding Performance by an Ensemble in a Comedy Series	The Office	Won
2008	ALMA Awards	Outstanding Male Performance in a Comedy Series	The Office	Nominated
2008	Screen Actors Guild Awards	Outstanding Performance by an Ensemble in a Comedy Series	The Office	Won
2008	TV Land Awards	Future Classic Award	The Office	Won
2009	ALMA Awards	Outstanding Actor in a Comedy Series	The Office	Won
2009	ALMA Awards	Actor in Film	The Proposal	Nominated
2009	Screen Actors Guild Awards	Outstanding Performance by an Ensemble in a Comedy Series	The Office	Nominated
2010	Imagen Awards	Best Supporting Actor – Television	The Office	Nominated
2010	Screen Actors Guild Awards	Outstanding Performance by an Ensemble in a Comedy Series	The Office	Nominated
2011	ALMA Awards	Favorite TV Actor – Supporting Role	The Office	Nominated
2011	Screen Actors Guild Awards	Outstanding Performance by an Ensemble in a Comedy Series	The Office	Nominated
2012	ALMA Awards	Favorite TV Actor – Supporting Role in a Comedy	The Office	Nominated
2012	Imagen Awards	Best Supporting Actor – Television	The Office	Nominated
2012	Screen Actors Guild Awards	Outstanding Performance by an Ensemble in a Comedy Series	The Office	Nominated
2013	Imagen Awards	Best Supporting Actor – Television	The Office	Nominated
2013	Screen Actors Guild Awards	Outstanding Performance by an Ensemble in a Comedy Series	The Office	Nominated
2016	Primetime Emmy Awards	Outstanding Actor in a Short Form Comedy or Drama Series	The Crossroads of History	Nominated
2021	Imagen Awards	Best Supporting Actor – Television (Comedy)	Mr. Iglesias	Nominated
2026	Critics' Choice Awards	Best Supporting Actor in a Comedy Series	The Paper	Nominated
