= Halfway Home (TV series) =

US television series

- The cast of Halfway Home. Counterclockwise: Kevin Ruf, Jordan Black, Jessica Makinson, Octavia Spencer, Regan Burns, and Oscar Nunez
- Created by: Oscar Nunez
- Starring: Jordan Black; Regan Burns; Jessica Makinson; Oscar Nuñez; Octavia Spencer; Kevin Ruf
- Composer: Ken Omega
- Country of origin: United States
- Original language: English
- No. of seasons: 1
- No. of episodes: 10

Production
- Executive producers: Damon Jones; Jay Martel; Oscar Nunez; Kevin Ruf
- Camera setup: Single-Camera setup
- Running time: 30 minutes

Original release
- Network: Comedy Central
- Release: March 14 – May 16, 2007

Halfway Home is an American sitcom that aired on Comedy Central in 2007. After airing 10 episodes, on June 20, 2007 costar Regan Burns confirmed that the show had ended.

On its official website, Halfway Home is described as an "improvised half-hour show featuring the daily exploits of five ex-cons living together in a residential rehab facility" (the fictional Crenshaw Halfway House, in Los Angeles, California).

== Characters ==
- Carly Barzac (played by Jessica Makinson) is an ex-convict for drug trafficking. She has a bad relationship with her parents (they screen her calls), and had to hire actors to pretend to be her parents on Parents' Day. She has set the world record for pogo-sticking. Carly's years of drug use have severely hindered her cognitive abilities, leaving her ditzy and, according to an online intelligence test, "mildly retarded." When she goes sober her IQ skyrockets; this led to her gaining the highest score ever on the GED test in the state of California. Unfortunately, this also leaves her irritable and violent, to the point where giving her more pot becomes the only option.
- Kenny Carlyle (played by Kevin Ruf) is the house supervisor. He is the stereotypical sensitive counselor who enforces the rules, while being known to break them on occasion. He has "no formal training regarding rehabilitation or psychology." He has apparently been working at the Crenshaw Halfway House for fifteen years. Kenny hopes to pursue a musical career but lacks the talent.
- Serenity Johnson (played by Octavia Spencer) is an ex-convict for armed robbery. She is very aggressive and hostile, threatening other housemates with violence, no matter what terms she is on with them. She has a troubled relationship with her mother, a beautician. She had aspirations of fame when she was interviewed for a television show, only to later discover the show was "America's Stupidest Criminals."
- Eulogio Pla (played by Oscar Nunez) was convicted for prostitution; his prison file describes him as "[using] sex to get what he wants." He comes from a very long line of prostitutes and is the only one in the family to have been arrested, a fact his father is deeply ashamed of. Eulogio seems to have some skills as a beautician. He fixes Carly's hair after Alan burns half of it off and, also, gives Del's delinquent nephew, Hubble a near-complete makeover.
- Alan Shepard (played by Regan Burns) is an ex-convict for arson, described as "the house narc who has an "uncontrollable obsession with fire". Alan married a woman after she lied and told him she was pregnant (she didn't become pregnant until two years after they had been married). They have five daughters, though according to him his "relationship with all of them is somewhat stressed at the moment, but you try living in a house with 6 females, all of whom constantly put you down as a man. Always belittling everything about you, including the size of your penis. I hate when they visit." Stemming from his wildly intolerant father, Shepard has been shown to have many bigoted beliefs, once stating, "I normally don't have anything against the gays and the dark skinned peoples of the world, but I don't want to live with them. And by live with them, I mean share the same zip code.". At times, though, he will try to get along with the other housemates, to varying degrees of success. He considers Kenny to be his best friend and thinks of himself as Kenny's second in command.
- Sebastian "C-Bass" Yates (played by Jordan Black) is an ex-convict for internet fraud. A computer hacker and a Muslim described as a "wanna-be terrorist who's really just a rich kid from Calabasas." He comes from a wealthy family and misses being in the Accelerated Computer Sciences program at Pepperdine University in Malibu. He is prejudiced against whites and sees himself as fighting for black rights (though he complains more than taking any action). He is on the rape list at prison and was suspected of being a virgin upon entering prison.

== Episodes ==
Episodes are listed in the order of the date they aired, which does not necessarily coincide with the order in which they were produced (as indicated by the production codes listed).

| No. | Title | Directed by | Written by | Original release date |
|---|---|---|---|---|
| 1 | "Halfway Narc" | Damon Jones | Damon Jones, Kevin Ruf, Oscar Nunez, Jay Martel | March 14, 2007 |
Alan smells something suspicious in the middle of the night and Kenny forces the residents to take drug tests. C-Bass attempts to exact revenge on Alan by martyring himself.
| 2 | "Halfway Impotent" | Damon Jones | Damon Jones, Kevin Ruf, Oscar Nunez, Jay Martel | March 21, 2007 |
C-Bass convinces Alan and Kenny that the Bureau of Prisons is responsible for their erectile dysfunction, but their boners return when Carly goes for the world record in pogo-sticking.
| 3 | "Halfway Hot" | Damon Jones | Damon Jones, Kevin Ruf, Oscar Nunez, Jay Martel | March 28, 2007 |
When a heat wave hits, the residents battle Kenny for access to air-conditioning. Carly develops a quixotic crush on Eulogio.
| 4 | "Halfway Parent's Day" | Jay Martel | Damon Jones, Kevin Ruf, Oscar Nunez, Jay Martel | April 4, 2007 |
Kenny invites the residents' parents to the house for some family bonding. The residents struggle to make up for years of dysfunction in a single day.
| 5 | "Halfway Camping" | Damon Jones | Damon Jones, Kevin Ruf, Oscar Nunez, Jay Martel | April 11, 2007 |
The residents embark on a trip into the wilderness. When Kenny leaves them on their own as part of a self-reliance exercise, they quickly panic and turn on each other.
| 6 | "Halfway New Guy" | Gary Auerbach | Damon Jones, Kevin Ruf, Oscar Nunez, Jay Martel | April 18, 2007 |
The residents fall back on prison rules to haze a new resident (Dax Shepard) — or "fish" — into submission. Kenny's musical ambitions are thwarted at an open-mic night.
| 7 | "Halfway Scared" | Jay Martel | Damon Jones, Kevin Ruf, Oscar Nunez, Jay Martel | April 25, 2007 |
The residents are asked to "scare straight" a mammoth-sized juvenile delinquent. Alan incinerates Carly's hair in an ear-candling accident.
| 8 | "Halfway High School" | Damon Jones | Damon Jones, Kevin Ruf, Oscar Nunez, Jay Martel | May 2, 2007 |
When Kenny convinces the residents to take the GED, Carly discovers that her chronic marijuana use has wreaked havoc on her cognitive abilities.
| 9 | "Halfway Working" | Damon Jones | Damon Jones, Kevin Ruf, Oscar Nunez, Jay Martel | May 9, 2007 |
Kenny forces the residents to seek employment at a shopping mall, where minimum-wage jobs prove more challenging than expected. Rats infest Crenshaw House.
| 10 | "Halfway Innocent" | Damon Jones | Damon Jones, Kevin Ruf, Oscar Nunez, Jay Martel | May 16, 2007 |
Season finale. Alan's wife (Mary Scheer) hires a high-powered attorney to exonerate her husband. Eulogio meets one of his former customers, who hasn't gotten over their sexual encounter.
