= Whatever It Takes (2000 film) =

- Theatrical release poster
- Directed by: David Raynr
- Written by: Mark Schwahn
- Produced by: Paul Schiff
- Starring: Shane West; Marla Sokoloff; Jodi Lyn O'Keefe; James Franco
- Cinematography: Tim Suhrstedt
- Edited by: Ronald Roose
- Music by: Edward Shearmur
- Production companies: Columbia Pictures; Phoenix Pictures
- Distributed by: Sony Pictures Releasing
- Release date: March 24, 2000
- Running time: 94 minutes
- Country: United States
- Language: English
- Budget: $15 million
- Box office: $9 million

Whatever It Takes is a 2000 American teen comedy film directed by David Raynr and starring Shane West, Marla Sokoloff, Jodi Lyn O'Keefe, and James Franco, this is also the film debut of Aaron Paul. It was released in the United States on March 24, 2000 by Sony Pictures Releasing. The film's story is a modern update of the 1897 play Cyrano de Bergerac by Edmond Rostand. Whatever It Takes received negative reviews from critics and was a box office bomb, grossing $9 million against a $15 million budget.

== Plot ==
Ryan Woodman is a bit of a geek with eyes for the school's most popular girl, Ashley Grant. This induces cringing in his neighbor and best friend, Maggie Carter, a cute, intellectual girl. Football jock Chris Campbell, who happens to be Ashley's cousin, has his eyes on Maggie, though.

Chris offers to help Ryan woo the girl of his dreams if he does the same for him with Maggie. They agree on the deal, so Ryan composes soulful e-mails for Chris to use with Maggie, while Chris advises Ryan to treat Ashley like dirt, with the reasoning it's the only way to get her attention.

At first, neither guy finds it easy to change their ways; Chris comes on too strong for Maggie's liking, and Ryan is too nervous to be a jerk to Ashley. But as they start to succeed, Ryan begins to see Maggie in a new light and wonders if he's pursuing the right girl. He realizes Ashley is not meant for him just as he is working to convince Maggie of Chris's affection for her.

Meanwhile, Maggie questions her own interest in the narcissistic Chris. Ryan's change in behavior, which includes insulting his geeky friends, also lowers Maggie's opinion of him. Then, Ryan learns Chris plans to “nail and bail” Maggie on the night of the school prom, a strategy he's done with every girl he's dated. He tells him that it won't work because Maggie is too good for that, but he blithely ignores him.

Ryan ends up confessing his feelings for Maggie and admits to her it was him writing her the romantic letters the whole time, not Chris. Feeling let down by the dishonesty, Maggie is hesitant to reciprocate his feelings. She ends up going to the prom with Chris while Ryan begrudgingly goes with Ashley.

At an afterparty in a hotel, before Chris can get Maggie into bed, she insists on tying him to it and blindfolding him, which he obliges. When he is fully restrained, Maggie tells him she has just played him and takes a Polaroid of him in the humiliating position. She leaves Chris in the room to be taunted, and drawn on by other partygoers.

Ryan ends up ditching Ashley and goes after Maggie. Back at their homes, he tries to talk to her over the balcony and apologizes for his wrongdoings. Maggie tells Ryan how hurt she is over the deception, which steered her into Chris's popular clique and led her to mistakenly feel like she belonged, and he replies that she does belong – with him. They then both realize their feelings for one another and kiss.

== Cast ==
- Shane West as Ryan Woodman
- Marla Sokoloff as Maggie Carter
- Jodi Lyn O'Keefe as Ashley Grant
- James Franco as Chris Campbell
- Aaron Paul as Floyd
- Richard Schiff as P.E. Teacher
- Julia Sweeney as Kate Woodman
- Colin Hanks as Cosmo
- Kip Pardue as Harris
- Scott Vickaryous as Stu
- Manu Intiraymi as Dunleavy
- David Koechner as Virgil Doolittle
- Nicole Tarantini as Marnie
- Christine Lakin as Sloane
- Kevin Ruf as Security Guard
- Eric Kushnick as Stoner
- Shyla Marlin as Shyla
- Vanessa Evigan as Vanessa
- Nick Cannon as Chess Club Kid
- Romy Rosemont as Cosmo's Date
- Rachel Kuber as Miranda

== Production ==
The film was shot under the title I'll Be You. It uses the chaotic "pool under the gym floor opening at the prom" scene, as seen in It's a Wonderful Life (1946).

== Reception ==
On Rotten Tomatoes, the film has an approval rating of 15% based on 66 reviews. The site's critical consensus reads, "Whatever It Takes is another run-of-the-mill teeny-bopper romance flick. Cliche jokes and a tired plot capture few laughs". On Metacritic, it has a score of 20% based on reviews from 22 critics, indicating "generally unfavorable" reviews.

A.O. Scott of The New York Times criticized the film's predictable plot, and pointed out that "the script's way of handling its romantic complications is unusually obtuse and insensitive." Scott said the film's treatment of the Ashley character, who is humiliated for laughs, "strikes an ugly, misogynist note."

Owen Gleiberman of Entertainment Weekly said the film had "ersatz versions of stars who, in this case, are fairly vanilla to begin with".

== Accolades ==
- Teen Choice Awards
  - Choice Comedy Movie: Nominated
  - Choice Movie Sleazebag: Nominated
  - Choice Movie Hissy Fit: Nominated

== Home media ==
Whatever It Takes was released on VHS and DVD in North America in August 2000.
