= Oasis (Star Trek: Enterprise) =

- Star Trek: Enterprise episode
- Episode no.: Season 1 Episode 20
- Directed by: Jim Charleston
- Story by: Rick Berman; Brannon Braga; Stephen Beck
- Teleplay by: Stephen Beck
- Production code: 120
- Original air date: April 3, 2002

Guest appearances
- René Auberjonois - Ezral; Tom Bergeron - Alien Trader D'Marr; Annie Wersching - Liana; Rudolph Willrich - Captain Kuulan; Claudette Sutherland - Maya

Episode chronology
| ← Previous "Acquisition" | Next → "Detained" |
- Star Trek: Enterprise season 1

"Oasis" is the twentieth episode (production #120) of the television series Star Trek: Enterprise. It was developed into a teleplay by Stephen Beck from a story by Rick Berman, Brannon Braga and Beck. Jim Charleston was the director. The episode aired on UPN on April 3, 2002. It guest stars René Auberjonois, who previously starred as Odo in Star Trek: Deep Space Nine, and marked the screen debut of Annie Wersching.

The crew is directed to a barren planet where a derelict ship may be salvageable for supplies. The crew comes to suspect that rumours about the shipwreck being haunted may be true.

== Plot ==
Captain Archer, Sub-Commander T'Pol and Commander Tucker are dining with D'Marr, a visiting trader. He tells them of a "haunted" transport vessel that has crashed on a nearby planet, and Archer orders an away team to investigate. Once on board, T'Pol hears a noise, but detects nothing with her tricorder, while Archer and Ensign Mayweather find a computer terminal and decide to take it back to the Enterprise. In engineering, Tucker and T'Pol discover a section of the ship protected with a dampening field. As they make their way to locate its generator, they find a chamber containing many armed crewmembers.

Two of the Kantare, Ezral and Captain Kuulan, tell the away team the ship was attacked by raiders three years ago. Archer offers assistance, which Ezral accepts. But all is not as it seems: Lieutenant Reed's analysis of the ship reveals impact damage, but no weapons signatures. Oxidation of the ship reveals it crashed nearly 22 years previously. Mayweather states that the aeroponics bay isn't big enough to feed all of the crew. Further, Reed opens an escape pod, and Tucker is amazed to see the corpse of a man he spoke to on the planet's surface only an hour before.

On the vessel, T'Pol and Tucker are suddenly taken hostage, while Archer and Reed are ordered to leave. Enterprise then plans a rescue mission. During the raid, the Kantaran crew emerge from the walls and overwhelm them. Liana, Ezral's daughter, removes some data cards from the computer and the crew disappear - all were holograms except Ezral and Liana. Ezral explains that he was the chief engineer on the ship, and due to his negligence, half the crew died in an ion storm. He later recreated his dead wife and the crew to provide a home environment for his young daughter. Accepting reality, he finally requests the repair components required to make his ship space-worthy.

== Production ==
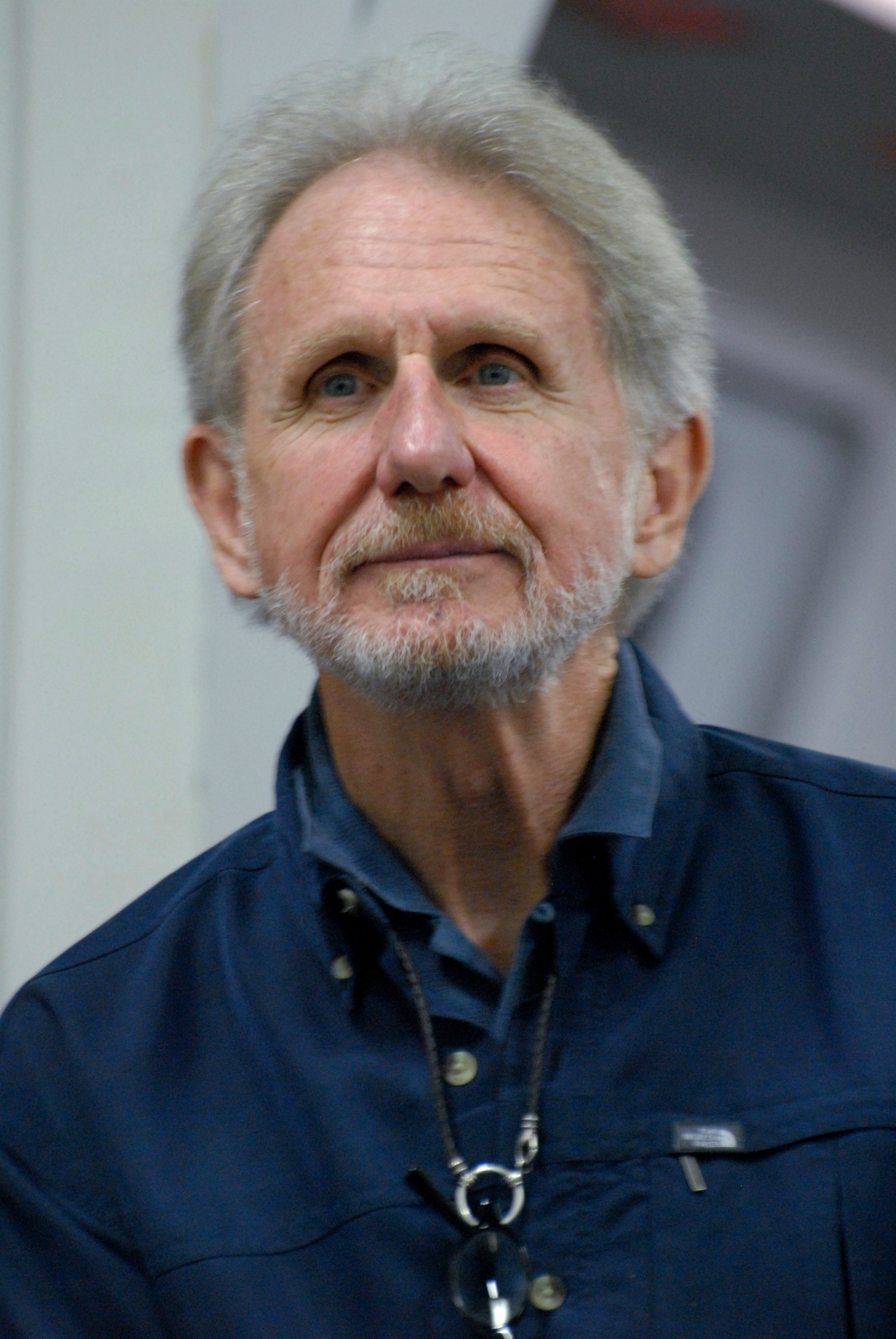
Guest star René Auberjonois, known for playing Odo in Star Trek: Deep Space Nine

Annie Wersching who played Liana, had previously acted only in theatre, and this was her first onscreen work. In 2022 she appeared in Star Trek: Picard season 2, in a recurring role as the Borg Queen. Producer Akiva Goldsman even considered the possibility of connecting the two roles and having her be the same character, becoming queen after assimilation but ultimately the idea was dropped.

René Auberjonois, who guest stars as Ezral, is known for playing Odo in Star Trek: Deep Space Nine. He said that the story reminded him of an episode he had done before, saying it not as a criticism, but as an example that in such a long-running series "there will be recurring themes". The Star Trek: Deep Space Nine episode "Shadowplay" also features villagers going missing and a similar conclusion. Auberjonois also thought the story had elements of Prospero and Miranda in The Tempest. He was very positive about Scott Bakula, and said: "He's one of the warmest, most welcoming [actors]. He has really influenced the whole feeling the show". Guest star Tom Bergeron is better known for hosting the gameshow Hollywood Squares. The episode was his first acting role. Bergeron returned in the season 4 episode "Demons" as the Coridan Ambassador.

Oasis was noted as an example of hologram technology in a Star Trek story.

== Reception ==
"Oasis" first aired on UPN on April 3, 2002. According to Nielsen Media Research, it received a 3.3/5 rating share among adults. The episode had an average of 5.6 million viewers.

Aint It Cool News rated it 3 out of 5, said it bore some similarities to "The Cage", and was critical of the ending. Michelle Erica Green of TrekNation noted its similarity with the episode "Shadowplay" and criticized the writers for using such a recognisable premise, but also suggested it might have been an attempt by the writers to reinterpret the father-daughter story of Prospero and Miranda from The Tempest by William Shakespeare. She called it "creepier than a ghost story". She had positive notes about the supporting cast, but called it "a dismal outing" for Archer. About.com's Julia Houston was distracted by the casting of Auberjonois, positive about the acting, but critical of the lack of originality, and said it was "A lot of really good work pretty much wasted on a recycled story." Television Without Pity gave the episode a grade C+. Keith DeCandido of Tor.com gave it 6 out of 10 in his 2022 rewatch, and says that despite being derivative it is quite an enjoyable episode, praising "a strong, heartfelt, tragic performance by Auberjonois".

== Home media ==
This episode was released as part of Enterprise Season One, which was released in high definition on Blu-ray disc on March 26, 2013; the release has 1080p video and a DTS-HD Master Audio sound track.
