= Dog with a Blog =

American comedy television series

- Genre: Comedy
- Created by: Michael B. Kaplan; Philip Stark
- Starring: G Hannelius; Blake Michael; Francesca Capaldi; Regan Burns; Beth Littleford
- Voices of: Stephen Full
- Theme music composer: David Wilde
- Composers: David Wilde; Kenneth Burgomaster
- Country of origin: United States
- Original language: English
- No. of seasons: 3
- No. of episodes: 69 (list of episodes)

Production
- Executive producer: Michael B. Kaplan
- Producer: Leo Clarke
- Cinematography: John Simmons
- Editors: Brady Heck; Mark Pitner
- Camera setup: Multi-camera
- Running time: 21–22 minutes
- Production companies: Diphthong Productions; It's a Laugh Productions

Original release
- Network: Disney Channel
- Release: October 12, 2012 – September 25, 2015

Dog with a Blog is an American comedy television series created by Michael B. Kaplan and Philip Stark that aired on Disney Channel from October 12, 2012 to September 25, 2015. The series stars G Hannelius, Blake Michael, Francesca Capaldi, Regan Burns, and Beth Littleford, and also features the voice of Stephen Full.

== Premise ==
Set in Pasadena, California, Avery Jennings' mother, Ellen, has just married Tyler and Chloe James' father, Bennett, and now the new family needs to adjust to living together. They face an even bigger adjustment when they discover that their new dog, Stan, can talk. Only Avery, Tyler, and Chloe know this. Unbeknownst to the family, Stan also has a blog where he discusses happenings in the Jennings-James household in hopes of finding other talking animals. The children learn of Stan's talking ability in the first episode and agree to keep it a secret from their parents, fearing if the world finds out that Stan can talk, he will be taken away for experimentation.

== Episodes ==
| Season | Episodes | Originally released | |
| Season | Episodes | First released | Last released |
|---|---|---|---|
| 1 | 22 | October 12, 2012 | August 25, 2013 |
| 2 | 24 | September 20, 2013 | September 12, 2014 |
| 3 | 23 | September 26, 2014 | September 25, 2015 |

== Cast and characters ==
=== Main ===
The main characters, from left to right: Avery, Bennett, Chloe, Ellen, Stan, and Tyler.

- G Hannelius as Avery Jennings, the highly intelligent, hard-working step-sister of Tyler and Chloe. She hates the fact that Tyler feels everything has to go his way and that good things always seem to happen to him, such as in "Stan of the House" when Tyler books the living room as an excuse to have the school cheerleading squad come over. Avery is very straightforward in following the rules and reluctantly goes along with what Tyler does. She is very smart, an overachiever, and knows what she wants. She wants everything to be handled in an orderly fashion, such as posting sign-up sheets for the living room and bathroom. Avery is socially responsible and despises boys like Tyler, though the two do have brother-sister heart-to-heart discussions showing that, at the end of the day, no matter how much Tyler annoys her, they love each other. She did not always love to take risks, but this changes when she steals a large pig in one episode. Avery is a very good problem solver and is the school's class president.
- Blake Michael as Tyler James, the popular brother of Chloe and step-brother of Avery. He seems to get by using his good looks, adding to Avery's jealousy, often causing the two to fight. Manipulative and occasionally a little vain, good things always seem to happen to him; he can get any pretty girl to go out with him and is extremely charismatic. Tyler is a math genius, found out later in the first season, and although he is very smart, Tyler slacks off in school due to laziness. In the episode "Stan of the House", he learns he needs to act more like a brother toward Avery and begins, on some occasions, to show his soft, serious, and mature side. Although he can sometimes be perceived as carefree and too laid back, Tyler will rush to a person's aid when they need help, showing that he cares about other people and is not at all judgmental or a bad person, as seen in "Stan of the House" when he comforts Avery after she breaks down crying over losing Stan. He can also be shown to be a little air-headed, but he has a quick wit and, like Avery, he knows what he wants and he will not stop at anything to get it.
- Francesca Capaldi as Chloe James, the younger sister of Tyler and step-sister of Avery. A running gag in the show is that the family will go somewhere and forget to bring Chloe home, and when they realize their error, they scream her name at the same time. Chloe is known to love candy, though her parents do not allow her to eat much. She secretly hides sweets around the house in places like pillowcases and TV remote battery compartments. She has a very active imagination, making up new names for various body parts and enjoys scaring Tyler while he sleeps.
- Stephen Full as The Voice of "Stan", the James-Jennings family's new dog who blogs and talks. He keeps his talking secret from Ellen and Bennett, and the only people who know that Stan can talk are Avery, Tyler, Chloe, Karl, and Grandma James. Stan hates noisy pomeranians and has a deep love of poodles. It is shown that Avery is his favorite child, which is reinforced by the fact that Stan talks to Avery the most of the three kids. As shown in "World of Woofcraft", he likes the game "Realm of the Tower". Although at times he seems almost human, he is still a dog and has many normal dog qualities and is very sensitive about it. While Stan does not like to admit it, he is also part cat and blames the fact that his dog ancestor "married" his one cat ancestor because it was the 1970s. Stan has a beloved toy monkey named Robert who is his companion. Grandma James found Robert while cleaning the family room and announced that the toy was so disgustingly filthy, it was going straight to the trash. Stan panicked and shouted Robert's name right in front of her, exposing his secret and making Grandma James faint. Stan is also very sensitive about being called "just a dog", which Avery called him in the episode "Stan Runs Away". After a year of secretly writing a blog about his experiences with the family, Avery, Chloe, and Tyler discover Stan's blog in "The Kids Find Out Stan Blogs".
- Regan Burns as Bennett James, Tyler and Chloe's father and Avery's step-father. He is a child psychologist who often acts immature and childish himself and is the author of several books in which he uses his family as examples, only changing the names. He always tries to think of ways to get his children to come together. He is also shown to be quite conceited. Sometimes his wife thinks he got his psychology degree online as his attempts at practicing psychology do not seem to go well. In "Stan of the House", he introduces Stan to the blended family in hopes that the dog will help his children bond.
- Beth Littleford as Ellen Jennings, Avery's mother and Tyler and Chloe's step-mother. She does not like dogs and makes it known that she does not like Stan; however, by the end of Howloween, she and Stan start to get along. It is later revealed that she dislikes Stan due to an incident with a dog she adored who suddenly left her. This is the cause of her reluctance to bond with Stan. She loves making jokes, often followed by her catchphrase, "Good one, Ellen!" She has been married to Bennett long enough to adopt some of his habits, including being scatterbrained. This could well account for their constant forgetting about Chloe. In Who's Training Who? Ellen hires a master dog trainer to keep Stan off the couch. Ignoring the trainer by daydreaming, Stan ends up outside until the children convince him that he's one of them, and he gives in and accepts the new dog bed Ellen bought him.

=== Recurring ===
- Kayla Maisonet as Lindsay, Avery's best friend. Lindsay's unique quality is that she always wears a hat, even when it is inappropriate. Lindsay often talks fast when she panics, often leading Avery to also talk fast. Except for her lack of intelligence, she has much in common with Avery. They love the same books and movies and often say the same things at the same time involuntarily, and she also dislikes Karl just like Avery. However, Avery dislikes Karl more than she does. In Avery B. Jealous, Wes, Avery's crush, asks Lindsay out on a date. Lindsay promises Avery that she will call off the date, but when they get in a fight, she decides to go out with Wes. Lindsay admits that she has always had a crush on Wes. In Avery-body Dance Now, she and Max confront Wes when he turns Avery down on an invite to the school dance after Karl tells Wes he is going with Avery.
- Denyse Tontz as Nikki Ortiz, Avery's friend and Tyler's current girlfriend. She has a dog named Evita, who Stan despises because she yaps too much. Nikki moved from El Salvador and is sweet and talented. In Wingstan, she is shown to be great at whistling and art. In Avery's First Crush, Nikki accidentally reveals her confusing and mysterious secret: "My brother didn't fall. He was pushed." In Love Ty-Angle, she becomes jealous of Tyler's girlfriend and is confused about it. Nikki asks Tyler to dump Emily for her, but since he can't trust his dream girl, he chooses Emily; however, she learns about Nikki's pursuit of Tyler. This leads to Tyler being broken up with by Emily and, despite never being picked second for anything, Nikki accepts when Tyler chooses her. It is later revealed in Dog on a Catwalk that they decided to take a break because the president of El Salvador asked Nikki to stay to increase tourism with her beautiful traits.
- LJ Benet as Karl Fink, Avery's frenemy. He and Avery are the smartest children in school; however, in contrast to Avery, Karl is a shameless jerk. Being very nosy, he often barges into the Jennings–James house without knocking. He also tries to find out Stan's secret in The Bone Identity. He despises Avery because when they were much younger, she stole his graham crackers at a science camp. He often has tea and snacks with Ellen, much to the discomfort of others, though they both claim that it is not weird. He once admits that he likes to send Ellen flowers under the alias of Walter Perkins. Karl has mentioned several times that his father is up on the International Space Station and talks often about his obsessive bodybuilding mother, who he says is the strongest woman in the world, though she has never been seen on the show. In Avery-body Dance Now, he teaches Avery how to dance for the school dance with Wes; however, he tells Wes that he is going to the school dance with Avery. In Karl Finds Out Stan's Secret, it is revealed that Karl has been spying on Stan and the children for a while. Now he knows that Stan can talk, but keeps it a secret.
- Danielle Soibelman as Max, one of Avery and Lindsay's best friends, as shown in the second season. She is shown to be a very negative, but overall nice, person despite sporting dark clothing. She likes to act tough and says she hates everything, but she also dances with Karl at the school dance.
- Peyton Meyer as Wes, Avery's crush in the second season. In Lost in Stanslation, Avery acts as his Spanish tutor; at the end, he asks her if it would be inappropriate to ask her out on a date in Spanish, but since she does not actually know the language, she answers yes in Spanish. He is very upset as he had said he wanted to ask her that even before she was his tutor. In Avery B. Jealous, Wes asks Lindsay out after being rejected by Avery, but in the end he says that he is glad that he isn't going with Lindsay as he wanted to go with Avery all along. In Avery-body Dance Now, he asks Avery to go to the school dance with him; however, when Avery seeks dance lessons from Karl, Wes becomes jealous of Karl, and when Karl tells Wes he is going with Avery, Wes goes by himself. After Lindsay and Max witness Wes' anger at Avery and Avery running out of the dance in tears, they learn of Karl's deception. Wes goes to Avery's house, where he tells her he likes her, and they return to the dance together. In The Green Eyed Monster, Stan accidentally captures a photo of Wes with another girl in the park, and Avery confronts him, which causes a temporary problem between her and Wes as he tells her he can't date a girl who doesn't trust him, but Tyler and Stan get together to convince Wes it wasn't Avery's fault and that she just has strange relatives. In Love, Lose and a Beanbag Toss, Avery notices that Wes is ignoring her; after several confrontations he finally tells her that his family is moving to another city. They both agree on a long-distance relationship through the Internet, but soon notice that it is not going to work out well. They then decide to end their relationship and try to move on.
- Griffin Kunitz as Mason, Chloe's current boyfriend. According to Chloe in Stan Gets Schooled, Chloe and Mason started their relationship because Chloe came up to him, said "You're my boyfriend!" and gave him a tongue click. It is shown in Stan Has Puppies that he has twin brother named Jason.
- Brighid Fleming as Heather Collins, Princess' owner and the Jennings–James' next-door neighbor who moved in with her family in Stan Falls in Love. She is shown to be spoiled, ridiculously snobby, and stuck up. She also seems to have a liking to Karl.

== Production ==
The series was co-created by Michael B. Kaplan, who previously co-created the Disney XD series I'm in the Band. Stephen Full was previously a cast member of that series, along with Beth Littleford who had a recurring role. G Hannelius and Regan Burns also previously guest starred on I'm in the Band during the show's two-season run.

On February 4, 2013, Disney Channel renewed the series for a second season. On February 4, 2014, the series was renewed for a third season by Disney Channel.

Kuma, the mutt who originally portrayed Stan, was replaced after five episodes due to a dispute with Kuma's owner. Another dog named Mick would portray Stan for the remainder of the series, with both dogs artificially painted with the same color scheme.

== Broadcast ==
Worldwide, the show aired on Disney Channel. The series premiered in the United States on October 12, 2012, and in Canada on November 23, 2012. The show later premiered in the United Kingdom and Ireland on December 21, 2012. In India, the series premiered on December 1, 2013 on Disney Channel India and on October 30, 2017 on Disney International HD. The second season premiered on November 26, 2014. The series premiered in Singapore on March 2, 2013, and in Australia and New Zealand on March 25, 2013. In Thailand the series premiered on February 18, 2017.

The series was made available on Disney+ on February 26, 2021.

== Reception ==
=== Critical ===
Dog with a Blog has received generally mixed reviews from critics. Critic Brian Lowry for Variety gave the show a mixed review, saying that "young kids should enjoy hearing Stan express dog-like thoughts", but concluded that "Dog with a Blog is strictly low-hanging-biscuit fare". Common Sense Media gave the show two stars out of five, calling it a "so-so sitcom" with "lackluster writing and cliche humor" while praising it for having "some heartwarming messages about families".

In a review on Gawker entitled "There Is a TV Show Called Dog with a Blog and It's About a Dog Who Blogs," Adrian Chen gave Dog With A Blog a mixed review, and remarked, "Unfortunately, there are only two short scenes where we see Stan blog in the pilot."

=== Ratings ===
Viewership and ratings per season of Dog with a Blog
| Season | Episodes | First aired | | Last aired | | Avg. viewers (millions) |
| Season | Episodes | Date | Viewers (millions) | Date | Viewers (millions) | Avg. viewers (millions) |
|---|---|---|---|---|---|---|
| 1 | 22 | October 12, 2012 | 4.50 | August 25, 2013 | 3.24 | 3.15 |
| 2 | 23 | September 20, 2013 | 2.99 | September 12, 2014 | 1.70 | 2.61 |
| 3 | 23 | September 26, 2014 | 2.19 | September 25, 2015 | 2.15 | 1.84 |

=== Awards and nominations ===
| Year | Award | Category | Result | Ref. |
|---|---|---|---|---|
| 2014 | Emmy Awards | Outstanding Children's Program | Nominated | |
| 2014 | Emmy Awards | Outstanding Voice-Over Performance; Stephen Full as "Stan" | Nominated | |
| 2015 | Kids' Choice Awards | Favorite TV Show | Nominated | |
| 2015 | Emmy Awards | Outstanding Children's Program | Nominated | |
| 2016 | Emmy Awards | Outstanding Children's Program | Nominated | |
