= Hastang =

Filipino modern rock band

- Origin: Cebu City, Cebu, Philippines
- Genres: modern rock
- Years active: 2005–present
- Members: Tessa Manto (vocals); Raul Gaw Luche (guitar); Murray Suson (guitar); Guile Canencia (bass guitar); Makoy Ladanan (drums)

Hastang is a modern rock band based in Cebu City, Cebu, Philippines. It is composed of members Tessa Manto (vocals), Raul Luche, Jr. (guitar), Murray Suson (guitar), Guile Canencia (bass), and Mark Austin Ladanan (drums).

== History ==
Hastang was formed in February 2005 when Mark and Guile (remnants of the now-defunct indie rock act Squirrel Talk) began jamming with Tessa and Roy with the sole purpose of writing all-original material.

The band’s first big break came in May 2005 when they made it to the finals of the MTV Hits Cebu band showdown held at the SM City Cebu Parking Lot. With their hard rocking song "Oblivion," Hastang went on to win second place over-all in the band competition. Since then, the band’s popularity in the indie scene increased as they made frequent appearances in music bars.

In 2006, the single "Random" began enjoying regular air play - even rising to the top 4 of a local station's weekly countdown.

Hastang also proved to be instrumental in reviving POST NO BILL, a series of gigs that showcases the best acts of the local music scene. Along with indie veterans Sheila and the Insects, Hastang has become a mainstay of this bi-monthly musical event held in various venues in Cebu.

== Album Recording ==
In late 2005, Hastang commenced the recording of their debut album, which contains 11 original tracks they’ve written and arranged in the last eight months. It was at this time that guitar player Raul (formerly of hard rock band Eve’s Garden) joined in to complete the dual-guitar format.

During this time, the band recorded 10 songs in Phoenix Glide Studios with the exception of "Random", which was recorded earlier in the summer of 2005 at the same studio. The said song was later re-mastered with Guile doing minor bass guitar re-dubs.

In early 2006, after four months of studio tracking and mixing, the band wrapped up the recording of the album.

== Band members ==
- Tessa Manto (lead vocals)
- Murray Suson (guitar)
- Raul Luche, Jr. (guitar)
- Mark Austin Ladanan (drums)
- Guile Canencia (bass)

Prior to joining Hastang:

- Current guitarist Raul played lead guitars for Eve's Garden.

== Music video ==
The music video for "Oblivion" debuted in MYX on February 3, 2007. The music video features all band members performing in an old, run-down house. The video was conceptualized and directed by Rember Gelera.
