= Kevin Ruf =

American actor and comedian (born 1961)

- Born: December 7, 1961 (age 64); Wilmington, Delaware, U.S.
- Education: University of California, Berkeley

Kevin Ruf (born December 7, 1961) is an American actor and comedian. He starred in the Comedy Central show Halfway Home as Kenny Carlyle, the house supervisor of a halfway house.

== Early life and education ==
Born in Wilmington, Delaware, Ruf grew up in Saratoga, California and attended Saratoga High School, where he played inside linebacker on the school's football team. Ruf graduated from the University of California, Berkeley.

== Career ==
He is a member of The Groundlings improvisational comedy theater and has guest written for Saturday Night Live. He appeared as the newsman in That Was The Week That Was on ABC's Primetime Live. He is also an attorney. In 2006, he argued and won a case before the California Supreme Court which expanded the rights of day laborers. The case was entitled Smith v. L'Oreal.

Ruf guest starred in a 2008 episode of the Comedy Central series Reno 911! playing Kyle Overstreet, a convict who has recently been released after ten years in prison and has sworn to get revenge on the officers who put him behind bars. Unfortunately, none of the police officers remember arresting Kyle, and they even struggle to remember his name despite meeting him several times throughout the episode.

== Awards ==
Ruf was named a California Lawyer of the Year ("CLAY Award") in 2019 for his work in the California Supreme Court, arguing the winning side in the groundbreaking case, Dynamex Operations West, Inc. v. Superior Court.

== Filmography ==
=== Film ===
Year	Title	Role	Notes
1998	The Curve	Ernie	
2000	Whatever It Takes	Security Guard	
2004	Eulogy	Commercial Dad	
2005	Fun with Dick and Jane	Karen Williams' Receptionist	
2017	Tangoborn Menclenty	Urologist #3	

=== Television ===
Year	Title	Role	Notes
1997	Life with Louie	Veteran	Episode: "Military Reunion"
1997–1998	Jenny	Ted Tucker	7 episodes
1998	Seinfeld	Security Guard	Episode: "The Bookstore"
1999	Freaks and Geeks	Police Officer	Episode: "Beers and Weirs"
1999	Friends	The Porsche Owner	Episode: "The One with Joey's Porsche"
1999	Uncomfortably Close with Michael McKean	Trevor	Episode: "Jerry Stiller"
1999	Ultimate Trek: Star Trek's Greatest Moments	Paramount Studio Cop	Television film
1999	The Whitey Show	Series Regular	Television film
1999–2000	3rd Rock from the Sun	T.V. Reporter #2 / New Father	2 episodes
2000	Battery Park	Sexual Harassment Instructor	Episode: "You Give Law a Bad Name"
2000	Spin City	Attendant	Episode: "The Spanish Prisoner"
2000	Curb Your Enthusiasm	Couple #1	Episode: "AAMCO"
2000	Running with Scissors	Various	Episode #1.1
2001	The Weber Show	Waiter	Episode: "...And Then the Sex Freaked Jack Out"
2001	According to Jim	Dr. Josh Nelson	Episode: "Andy's Girlfriend"
2004	Significant Others	Parent #3	Episode: "A School, Not Cool & a Fool"
2007	Halfway Home	Kenny Carlisle	10 episodes
2008	Reno 911!	Kyle Overstreet	Episode: "Super Knockers!"
2018, 2020	Mike Tyson Mysteries	Harold Feder / Mike's Attorney	2 episodes
