= Prosecuting Casey Anthony =

- Written by: Alison Cross; Jeff Ashton
- Directed by: Peter Werner
- Theme music composer: Richard Marvin
- Country of origin: United States
- Original language: English

Production
- Cinematography: James Chressanthis
- Editor: David Beatty
- Running time: 91 minutes
- Production companies: Fox Television Studios; Lifetime Television

Original release
- Network: Lifetime
- Release: January 19, 2013

Prosecuting Casey Anthony is a 2013 American made-for-television drama film about the Casey Anthony trial.

== Cast ==
- Rob Lowe as Jeff Ashton
- Elizabeth Mitchell as Linda Drane Burdick
- Oscar Nuñez as Jose Baez
- Virginia Welch as Casey Anthony
- Marina Stephenson Kerr as Cindy Anthony
- Marisa Ramirez as Rita Ashton
- Kevin Dunn as George Anthony
