= Oblivious (British TV series) =

- Also known as: Oblivious Popstars
- Genre: Hidden camera comedy game show
- Created by: Mark Baker; Steve Havers
- Presented by: Davina McCall
- Country of origin: United Kingdom
- Original language: English
- No. of series: 1
- No. of episodes: 8 (inc. 1 special)

Production
- Running time: 50 minutes (including ads)
- Production companies: Tiger Aspect Productions and Mast Media

Original release
- Network: ITV
- Release: 14 July 2001 – 4 March 2003

Related
- Oblivious

Oblivious is a hidden camera comedy game show that aired on ITV from 14 July to 24 December 2001 and hosted by Davina McCall. It came back as a one-off special on 4 March 2003 entitled Oblivious Popstars.
