= Stephen Full =

American actor and comedian (born 1969)

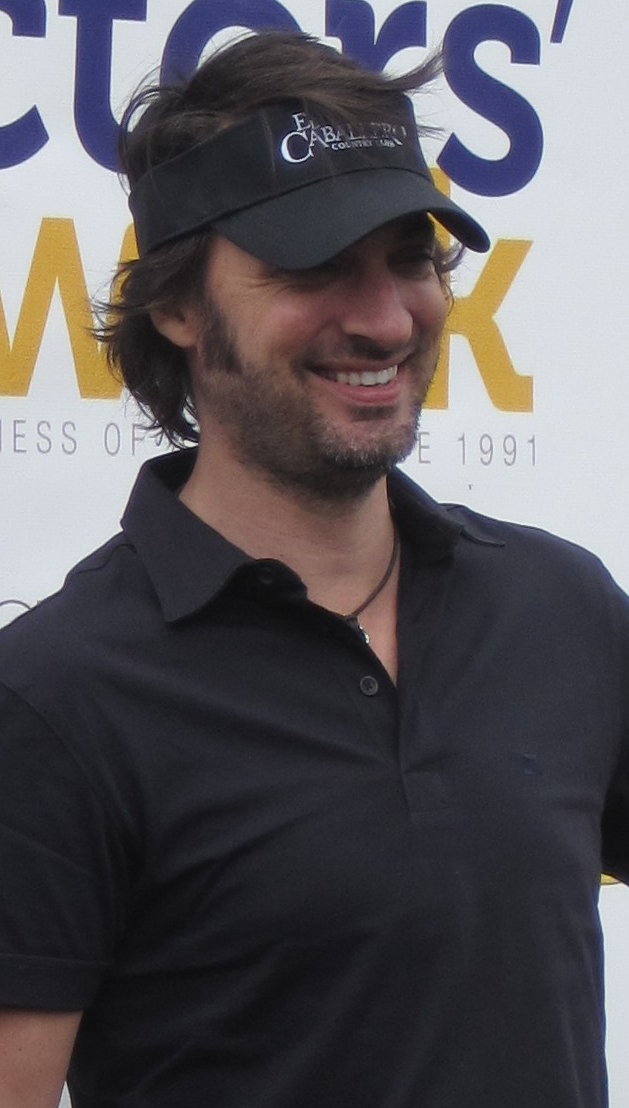
- Full in 2011
- Born: November 13, 1969 (age 56); Chicago, Illinois, U.S.
- Occupations: Actor, comedian
- Years active: 1991–present
- Height: 191 cm (6 ft 3 in)
- Spouse: Annie Wersching (m. 2009; died 2023)
- Children: 3

Stephen Full (born November 13, 1969) is an American actor and comedian, known for his voice role as Stan on the Disney Channel show Dog with a Blog, and acting role as Ash on I'm in the Band, which aired on Disney Channel's sister network, Disney XD.

== Early life ==
Full was born in Chicago, Illinois. He attended St. Charles High School and was recognized as a talented actor from a young age. He also drove a hearse as his automobile in high school, true to his comedic reputation.

== Career ==
Full guest starred in NBC's Las Vegas for two episodes and Disney Channel's Hannah Montana.

He and the other cast members of I'm in the Band appeared in a cross-over episode of The Suite Life on Deck ("Weasels on Deck").

He also is the voice of Stan, a talking dog with a big heart, in the Disney television show Dog With A Blog.

He appeared in "Overkill", in season 2 of ABC's Castle and appeared in "Murder Sings the Blues", in season 3 of CSI: NY.

He guest-starred on Best Friends Whenever as Ray, a pizza delivery man.

He guest-starred on iCarly as a customer on the "iOwe You" episode at Chili My Bowl.

Full guest-starred on NCIS season 16 episode 14 "Once Upon A Tim" as Mr. Lewis, Tim McGee's teacher.

== Personal life ==
Full owns his home in Los Angeles, and was married to actress Annie Wersching from September 2009 until her death in January 2023. They have three sons together.

== Filmography ==
=== Film ===
Year	Title	Role	Notes
2003	A False Prophet	The Drug Dealer	Short film
2004	Morton	The Detective	Short film
2005	To Slay a Giant	Wilson Billington	Short film
2006	2 Dogs Inside	Jake	Short film
2006	Resilience	Caleca's Brother	

=== Television ===
Year	Title	Role	Notes
2008	iCarly	Lenny	Episode: "iOwe You"
2009–2011	I'm in the Band	Ash	Main cast 36 episodes
2012–2015	Dog with a Blog	Stan the talking Dog (voice)	Main cast 69 episodes
2014	Growing Up Fisher	Dean	Episode: "Madi About You"
2016	Rizzoli & Isles	Parking Enforcement Officer	Episode: "Post Mortem"
2019	NCIS	Mr. Lewis	Episode: "Once Upon A Tim"
2024	The Really Loud House	Phillipe	2 episodes
