= Obliviousness =

Aspect of cognitive psychology

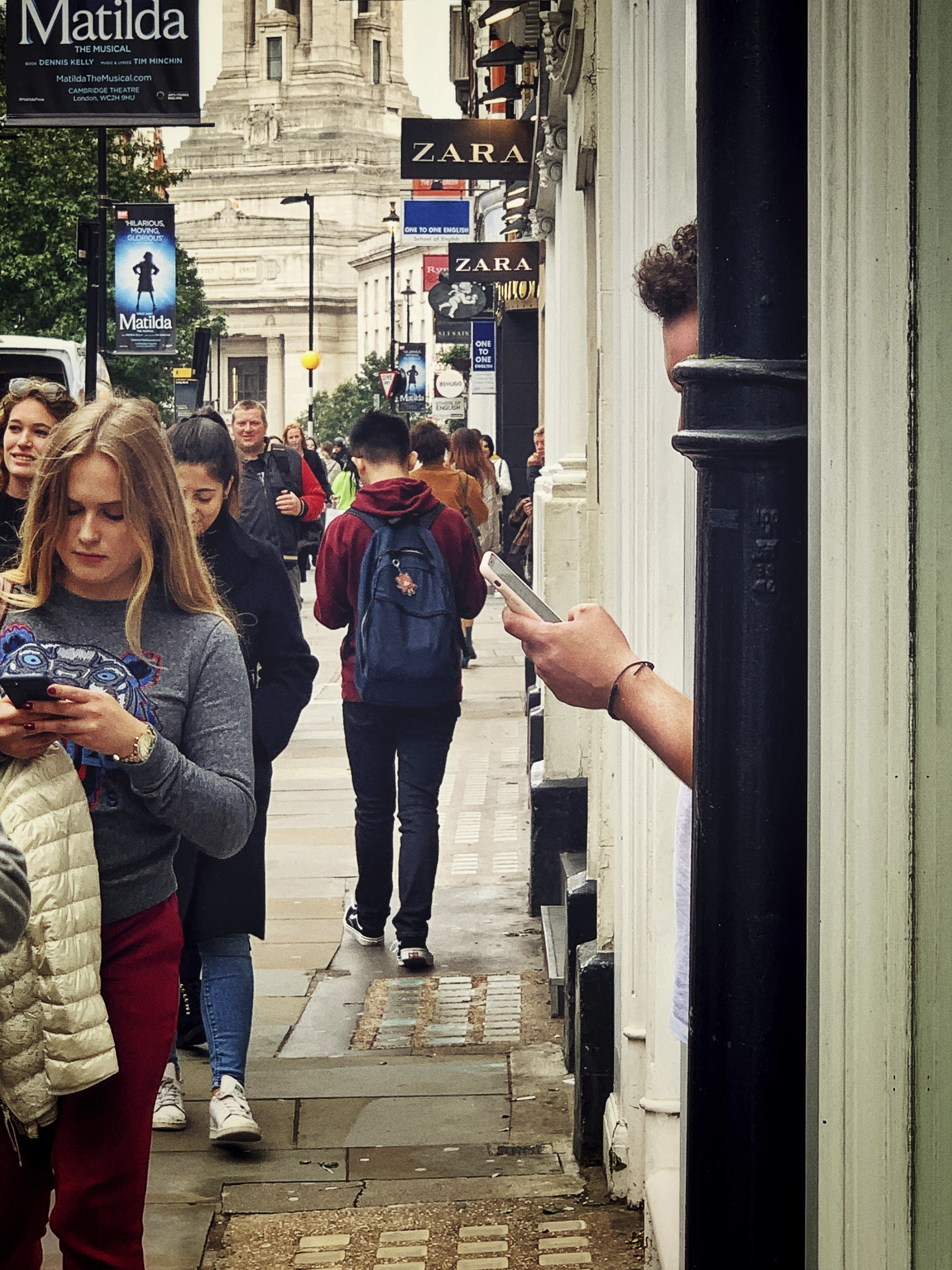
Mobile phone users are often considered to be oblivious to things going on around them.

Obliviousness is the mental state of being oblivious, generally understood to mean "a state of being unmindful or unaware of something, of being ignorant or not conscious of its existence". Obliviousness differs from unconsciousness in that the oblivious person is conscious, and could or should be aware of the things of which they remain unaware. A state of obliviousness may be intentionally sought by those wishing to avoid acknowledging or dealing with surrounding realities. In fiction and literature, obliviousness is often used for comedic effect.

== Overview ==
Obliviousness may be described as going beyond a mere lack of some level of awareness, and becoming an act of repression of an awareness that should exist. Although an unconscious person may similarly be unaware of things around them, obliviousness "implies not a cessation of all attention but only that directed outwardly", with the oblivious person's attention being "directed inwardly—to thoughts, feelings, imaginings, fantasies, worries or bodily states which have nothing or little to do with the world at hand".

Obliviousness "extends to activities, especially those involving drudgery or repetition", for which "[p]eople may actually encourage a state of obliviousness as they work". It is "sometimes associated with positive inner states", but "more often occurs in situations of sickness, hurry or negativity". It has been suggested that when individuals exhibit an absence of concern about what others think of them, this "could be due either to their obliviousness to social concerns or to their desire to create the image, in their own minds and for others, of being autonomous and independent individuals".

In some contexts, obliviousness to problems serves as a defense mechanism against the need to engage in efforts to change those problems. For example, members of a majority group may be oblivious to discrimination and related struggles faced by members of a minority with whom they regularly interact. Remaining oblivious relieves the majority group members of a sense of responsibility for the problems of the minority group.

== In popular culture ==
In fiction, obliviousness is commonly exploited for comedic value, and the characteristic has been described as "tailor-made for comic plotting; no sooner does 'reality' assert itself than a recovery commences". The characteristic is identified as one of the key traits of the "lovable loser" character archetype, typified by the behavior of such characters in describing plans or pursuing dreams that objective observers immediately realize are futile, a fact to which the loser remains oblivious.
