= Oblivious (American game show) =

- Genre: Hidden camera comedy game show
- Created by: Mark Baker; Steve Havers
- Presented by: Regan Burns
- Country of origin: United States
- Original language: English
- No. of seasons: 2

Production
- Running time: approx. 26 minutes
- Production company: Stone Stanley Entertainment

Original release
- Network: Spike
- Release: August 1, 2002 – June 1, 2004

Related
- Oblivious

Oblivious (rendered on screen as Obliviou$) is a hidden camera comedy game show based on the British format by Tiger Aspect Productions and Mast Media of the same name.

== Gameplay ==
Host Regan Burns would take a camera crew with him and ask unsuspecting people trivia questions, while playing some sort of role. The person being asked the questions did not know they were on TV until after Burns finished asking the questions, but usually he would do one final bit in his role before revealing the truth. For every question the contestant got correct, they received $20 in cash. Five questions usually were asked per person, for a possible $100.

At the start of the show, and before and after commercial breaks, Burns would walk up next to someone on the street and ask a single question for $20, before saying "We'll be right back" or a similar phrase. On some occasions, this money was refused.

Once per episode, there was a speed round, where contestants could get $20 for every question they answered correctly within one minute. At the end, contestants got a chance at a $100 bonus question, with that amount in cash given to them if they got it right.

Once per episode, Burns would give the unsuspecting contestant a chance at up to $500 more (this was called the Lightning Round), if s/he would take on the role of quizmaster. He would walk them through it using a hidden camera and a headset microphone out of view, and for every question that the next contestant got right, the first player got $100. (The other player got $20 per correct answer regardless.)

Sometimes other actors pretend to win money with the contestant.

=== Disguises ===
These are some of the disguises played by the host:

- Florist
- Janitor
- Artist
- Tennis Instructor
- Video store worker
- Camera store worker
- Travel agent
- Hollywood agent
- Clown
- Gas station attendant
- Spanish person that sung songs at Taco Bell
- A man getting married at Taco Bell
- Bartender
- Hospital patient
- Boxing referee

== International versions ==
Country	Name	Host(s)	Network	Date premiered
Germany	Keine Ahnung? Ahnungslos – Das Comedyquiz	Mario Barth; Joko Winterscheidt and Klaas Heufer-Umlauf	ProSieben	2003–2005; 2010–2012
Italy	Oblivious	Premiata Ditta	Italia 1	2003
Turkey	Zoka	Sahan Gökbakar; Dilek Çelebi; Kamil Güler; Burak Satibol	TV8	2004–2005
United Kingdom (original format)	Oblivious	Davina McCall	ITV	2001–2003
United States	Oblivious	Regan Burns	Spike	2002–2004
