= Regan Burns =

American actor and comedian (born 1968)

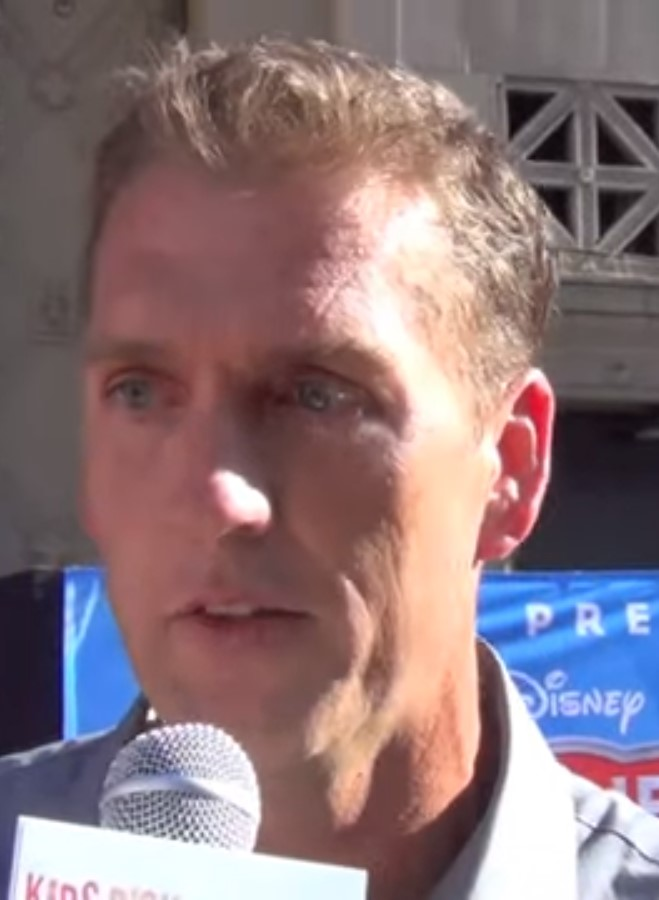
- Burns in 2013
- Born: June 14, 1968 (age 58); Fort Benning, Georgia, U.S.
- Education: Radford University
- Occupations: Actor, comedian
- Years active: 1997–present
- Spouse: Jennifer Warren (m. 1995)
- Children: 2

Regan Burns (born June 14, 1968) is an American actor, comedian, and game show host. He is best known for his role as Bennett James on Dog with a Blog, as well as being the host of the hidden camera game show Oblivious. Burns is also known for various roles in TV commercials and programs in the United States and the United Kingdom.

== Career ==
Burns attended Radford University on a gymnastics scholarship, but gave it up to pursue theater instead. He graduated from Radford in 1991. After graduating, he studied acting at the American Academy of Dramatic Arts. Burns hosted the game show Oblivious, in which Burns acted as someone or something, such as an artist or golf instructor, and asked a contestant a series of five questions in conversation. The contestant wouldn't realize it was a hoax until all questions had been asked. They would then receive money for answering questions.

Burns's other work include commentary for several E! shows. He played the arsonist Alan Shepard on Comedy Central's Halfway Home and plays a recurring character on Fox News Channel's The 1/2 Hour News Hour. He also appeared as a citizen of Reno, Nevada in an episode of Reno 911! and had a cameo in the direct-to-DVD movie Get Smart's Bruce and Lloyd: Out of Control as a lab tech.

His work is mainly seen in TV commercials in both the United States and the United Kingdom, as he has appeared in various ads for Arby's, Capital One, Volkswagen, Holiday Inn, Enterprise Rent-A-Car, Boston Pizza, Ooma, and others. Burns has also played "Beerman" in commercials for Coors Light. He appeared in the Back to You episode "A Gentleman Always Leads," which aired October 10, 2007. In December 2007, he appeared as a cashier in a corporate stunt by Burger King titled "Whopper Freakout" where a United States Burger King franchise informs its customers the signature Whopper has been discontinued.

Burns played a teacher in two episodes of Zoey 101, and appeared in an episode of Supernatural later that year. In July 2010, he appeared in an episode of Sonny With a Chance. He has also appeared in an episode of I'm in the Band. In August 2010, Burns appeared in Zeke and Luther. From 2012 to 2015, Burns starred as Bennett James on the Disney Channel series Dog with a Blog.

Since March 2009, Burns has been a regular film review contributor (usually Thursday or Fridays) on The Marc Germain Show, on TalkRadioOne.com.

== Personal life ==
Burns married Jennifer Warren in 1995. Together, they have two children.

== Filmography ==
=== Films ===
Year	Title	Role	Notes
2000	The Best Man?	Lance	Short film
2001	The Gristle	Mr. Alden	
2008	Get Smart's Bruce and Lloyd: Out of Control	Laboratory Worker #3	
2009	3 Days Blind	Van	
2011	The Lutefisk Wars	Marty Ramstad	
2011	Some Guy Who Kills People	Ronald Howell	
2011	God Bless America	Michael Fuller	
2012	Wrong	Mike	
2012	Queens of Country	Dr. Bauer	
2012	Kidnap Party	Clayton Slater	
2016	The Standoff	Big Jim	
2018	Public Disturbance	Randy	
2018	I'll Be Next Door for Christmas	Chris	

=== Television ===
Year	Title	Role	Notes
1999	Suddenly Susan	Jeff	"One Man's Intervention Is Another Man's Tupperware Party" (Season 3, Episode 14)
1999	The Thirteenth Year	Joe	Television film
1999	The Drew Carey Show	Office Guy #2	"Y2K, You're Okay" (Season 5, Episode 1)
1999	Chicago Hope	Orderly	"Y' Gotta Have Heart" (Season 6, Episode 2)
1999	Jesse	Patient	"Students Get Flu/Carrie at Zoo/Monkey Throw Poo" (Season 2, Episode 3)
2000	The Amanda Show	Audience Member	"Episode 7" (Season 1, Episode 7)
2000	Rude Awakening	Vic	"On the Rocks with a Twist of Limey" (Season 2, Episode 18); "Yes Sir, That's My Baby" (Season 2, Episode 19)
2000	Get Real	Instructor #2	"Saved" (Season 1, Episode 16)
2000	3rd Rock from the Sun	Security Guard	"Dick Strikes Out" (Season 5, Episode 16)
2000	Malcolm & Eddie	Howard	"Double Play" (Season 4, Episode 20)
2000	Titus	Officer Charlie Regan	"Dave Moves Out" (Season 1, Episode 3); "Episode Eleven" (Season 1, Episode 9)
2000	Curb Your Enthusiasm	Security Guard	"Beloved Aunt" (Season 1, Episode 8)
2001	Cedric the Coach		Television film
2001	Three Sisters	Dan	"Blame the Messenger" (Season 1, Episode 11)
2001	The Hughleys	Mr. Franklin / Rudy the Dummy	"Road Rage" (Season 3, Episode 20)
2001	The Ellen Show	Officer B. Arthur	"Walden Pond" (Season 1, Episode 2); "Joe" (Season 1, Episode 7)
2001	The Mind of the Married Man		"Cold Splash of Truth" (Season 1, Episode 10)
2001–2002	Once and Again	Engineer	"Destiny Turns on the Radio" (Season 3, Episode 5); "One Step (Parent) Backward" (Season 3, Episode 15)
2002	Oblivious (U.S. game show)	Host	"Oblivious" (Season 1)
2004	All That	Cop	Episode: "Drake Bell"
2004	The District	Scuba Guy	"The Black Widow Maker" (Season 4, Episode 18)
2004	Malcolm in the Middle	Middle Aged Man	"Experiment" (Season 5, Episode 19)
2004	Oliver Beene	School Photographer	"Superhero" (Season 2, Episode 11)
2004	Without a Trace	Patient	"Thou Shalt Not..." (Season 3, Episode 2)
2005	CSI: Crime Scene Investigation	James Billmeyer	"Iced" (Season 5, Episode 23)
2005	Sports Central	Correspondent	Television film
2005-2008	Rodney	Gary	"Rodney Takes a Ship" (Season 1, Episode 19); "Rodney's Biggest Fan" (Season 2, Episode 17); "Waiting for Himelfarb" (Season 2, Episode 20)
2006	Untitled Paul Reiser Project	Brian Urtzgalanger	Television film
2006	Boston Legal	Stan	"Too Much Information" (Season 2, Episode 13)
2007	Supernatural	McG	"Hollywood Babylon" (Season 2, Episode 18)
2007	Halfway Home	Alan Shepherd	10 episodes
2007	The 1/2 Hour News Hour	Tim Davenport / Live Earth Reporter	7 episodes
2007	Back to You	Mr. Robbins	"A Gentleman Always Leads" (Season 1, Episode 4)
2007–2008	Zoey 101	Mr. Berringer	"Paige at PCA" (Season 3, Episode 18); "Rollercoaster" (Season 4, Episode 11)
2008	Las Vegas	Driving School Instructor	"Secrets, Lies and Lamaze" (Season 5, Episode 14)
2008	Reno 911!	Youth Group Leader / Snake Bite "Victim"	"The Wall" (Season 5, Episode 8); "The Tanning Booth Incident" (Season 5, Episode 11)
2008	'Til Death	Dan	"Dreamguys" (Season 3, Episode 3)
2009	How I Met Your Mother	Producer	"The Possimpible" (Season 4, Episode 14)
2009	Gary Unmarried	Car Salesman	"Gary Gives Sasha His Full Attention" (Season 2, Episode 10)
2010	I'm in the Band	Mr. Morton	"Geezers Rock" (Season 1, Episode 13)
2010	Notes from the Underbelly		"Baby on Board" (Season 2, Episode 9)
2010	Svetlana	Sven	"You're Svencome" (Season 1, Episode 7)
2010	Zeke and Luther	Mitch	"Super Shredder" (Season 2, Episode 17)
2010	It's Always Sunny in Philadelphia	Swim Club Manager	"Mac and Charlie: White Trash" (Season 6, Episode 5)
2010	Sonny with a Chance	Ryan Loughlin	"Sonny with a Secret" (Season 2, Episode 12); "Sonny with a Choice" (Season 2, Episode 24)
2011	Weeds	Witold	"Game-Played" (Season 7, Episode 3)
2011	State of Georgia	Director	"Foot in the Door" (Season 1, Episode 9)
2011	Wizards of Waverly Place	Everett Appleton	"Get Along, Little Zombie" (Season 4, Episode 23)
2012–2015	Dog with a Blog	Bennett James	Series Regular; 69 episodes Director: "Stan Rescues His Princess" (Season 3, Episode 20)
2013	NCIS: Los Angeles	Brad Ross	"History" (Season 4, Episode 15)
2013	Happy Endings	Connie	"Deuce Babylove 2: Electric Babydeuce" (Season 3, Episode 22)
2015	Melissa & Joey	Officer Calhoun	"You Say You Want an Ovulation" (Season 4, Episode 12)
2015	Major Crimes	Jim Norton	"A Rose Is a Rose" (Season 4, Episode 1)
2015	2 Broke Girls	Dannon	"And the Wrecking Ball" (Season 5, Episode 1)
2016	Comedy Bang! Bang!	Wilford	"Malin Akerman Wears a Black Blouse and Cropped Jeans" (Season 5, Episode 17)
2016	New Girl	Casting Director	"Helmet" (Season 5, Episode 16)
2017	Adam Ruins Everything	Ron	“Adam Ruins The Suburbs” (Season 2, Episode 11)
2018	Disjointed	Man	"Olivia's Shitballs" (Season 1, Episode 9)
2025	The Righteous Gemstones	Big Dick Mitch	(Season 4)
