= Magna Institute of Dental Technology =

Coordinates: 40.67687°N 73.84347°W

- Type: Public
- Location: New York, USA
- Campus: Urban
- Website: magnadentalstudio.com

The Magna Institute of Dental Technology is a dental school located in New York City.

== See also ==
- American Student Dental Association
- List of dental schools in the United States
