= Oblivion (Hastang song) =

"Oblivion" is a song by the Cebuano rock band Hastang. The song's lyrics was written by Julie Ann Ladanan (née Redoble), with the melody and music written by lead singer Tessa Manto and bass player Guile Canencia. The musical arrangement of the song is credited to Hastang.

== Music video ==
The music video for "Oblivion" is conceptualized and directed by Rember Gelera. The video features all the band members performing in an old, run-house. The music video debuted in MYX on February 3, 2007.
