= Annie Wersching =

American actress (1977–2023)

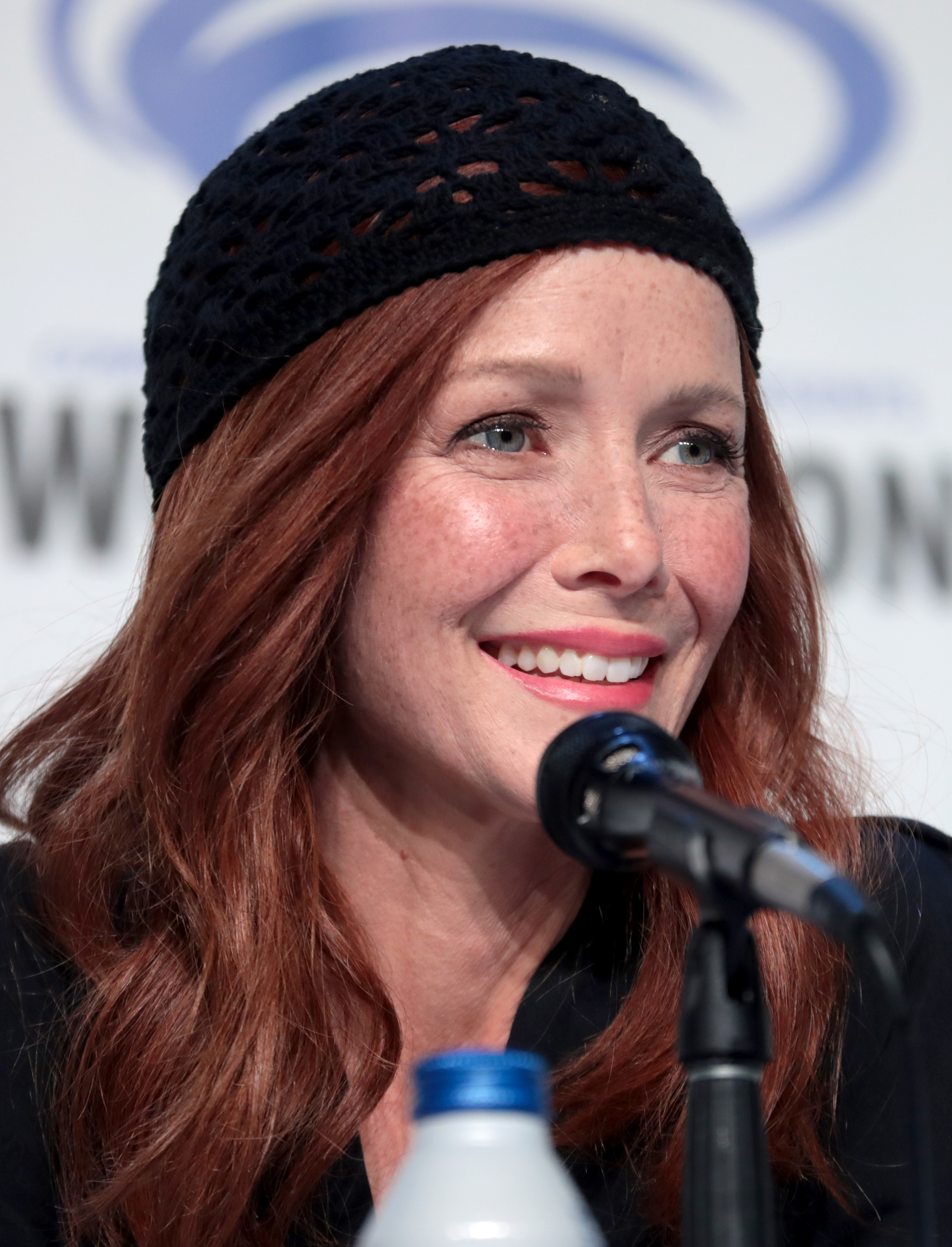
- Wersching in 2022
- Born: Anne Wersching; March 28, 1977; St. Louis, Missouri, U.S.
- Died: January 29, 2023 (aged 45); Los Angeles, California, U.S.
- Education: Millikin University (BFA)
- Occupation: Actress
- Years active: 2002–2023
- Spouse: Stephen Full (m. 2009)
- Children: 3

Anne Wersching (March 28, 1977 – January 29, 2023) was an American actress. She was known for her television roles as Renee Walker in 24, Julia Brasher in Bosch, Emma Whitmore in Timeless, Dr. Kelly Neiman in Castle, Leslie Dean in Runaways, Lily Salvatore in The Vampire Diaries and Rosalind Dyer in The Rookie, as well as the voice and performance-capture for Tess in the video game The Last of Us.

== Early life ==
Wersching was born in St. Louis, Missouri. She attended Crossroads College Preparatory School in St. Louis, graduating in 1995. During her youth, she competed in Irish dance and belonged to the St. Louis Celtic Stepdancers group. She received a BFA in musical theatre from Millikin University, from which she graduated in 1999.

== Career ==
Wersching began her acting career with a guest appearance in the 2002 episode Oasis on the show Star Trek: Enterprise and moved on to guest starring roles on such shows as Angel, Charmed, Cold Case, Killer Instinct, and Supernatural. From March to November 2007, she played the recurring role of Amelia Joffe on the ABC soap opera General Hospital. She also worked in theaters such as Victory Gardens, Marriott Lincolnshire, and the Utah Shakespearean Festival.

Wersching played FBI Special Agent Renee Walker in the seventh and eighth seasons of 24.

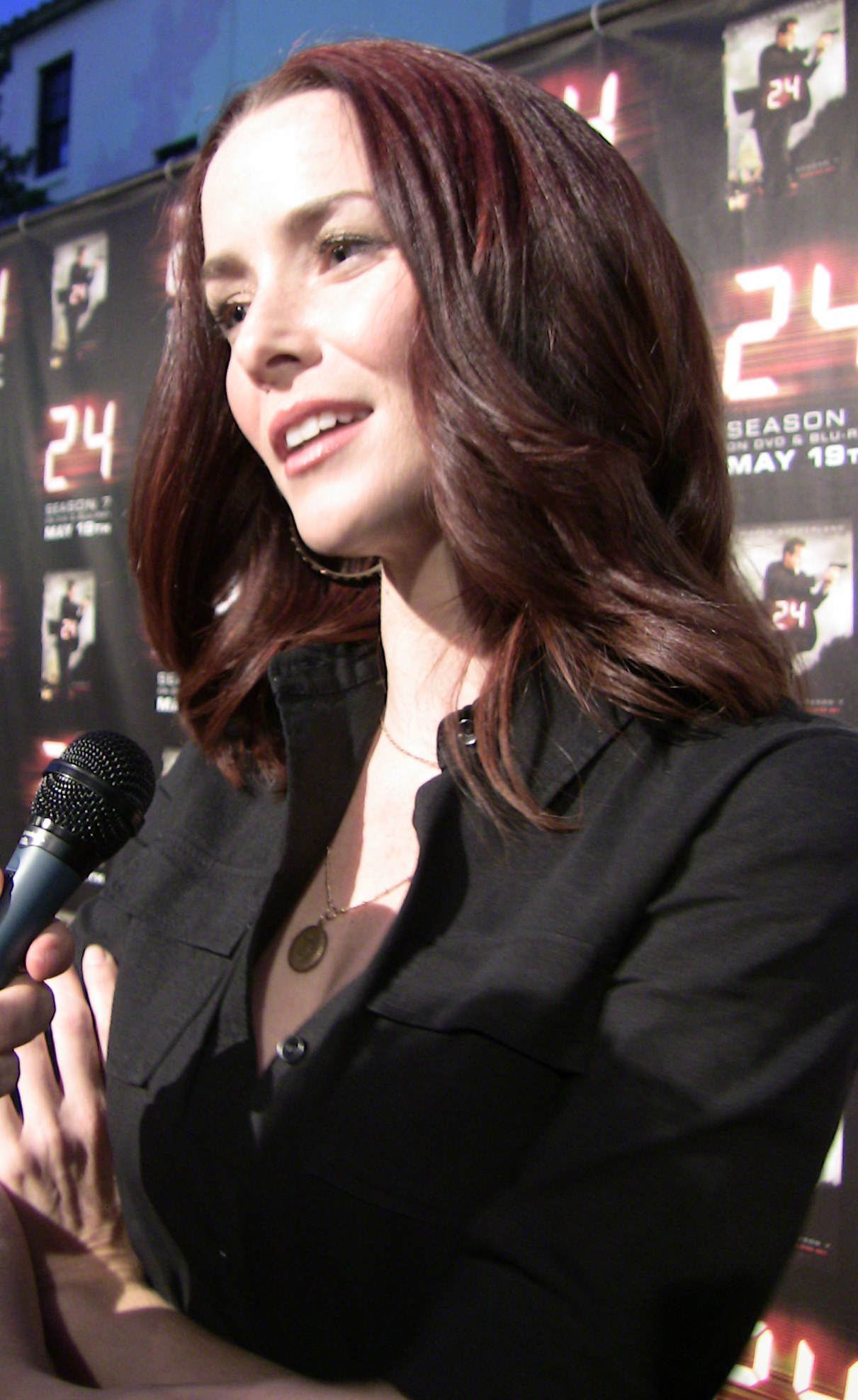
Wersching in 2009

After her two-season stint in 24, Wersching guest starred on various shows, including CSI, NCIS, Rizzoli & Isles, Hawaii Five-0, Body of Proof, Dallas, Revolution, Castle, Blue Bloods, The Vampire Diaries, and Touch.

Wersching played in the 2009 Taco Bell All-Star Legends and Celebrity Softball Game.

In December 2012, it was revealed that in the PlayStation 3 exclusive The Last of Us, Wersching was the voice and motion-capture actor of the character Tess. Her character was teased on Geoff Keighley's Twitter account before she was finally revealed in the story trailer shown on Spike Video Game Awards on December 7, 2012.

In 2014, she was a series regular for the first season of the Amazon Prime crime show Bosch. In 2022, she returned to the Star Trek franchise to play the Borg Queen in the second season of Star Trek: Picard. From 2017 to 2019, she had a main cast role playing Leslie Dean in the Hulu/Marvel original series Runaways. Between 2019 and 2022, she had a recurring role as Rosalind Dyer in The Rookie.

== Personal life and death ==
Wersching married actor and comedian Stephen Full at their Los Angeles home in September 2009. They had three sons together.

Wersching was diagnosed with cancer in mid-2020, which she kept private, and continued to act. She died from cancer on January 29, 2023, in Los Angeles, California, at age 45.

== Filmography ==
=== Film ===
Year	Title	Role
2003	Bruce Almighty	Woman at party
2010	Below the Beltway	Darcy

=== Television ===
Year	Title	Role	Notes
2002	Star Trek: Enterprise	Liana	Episode: "Oasis"
2002	Birds of Prey	Lynne Emerson	1 episode
2003	Frasier	Esthetician	1 episode
2003	Angel	Margaret	Episode: "Shiny Happy People"
2004	Charmed	Demonatrix Two	1 episode
2005	Out of Practice	Conner	1 episode
2005	Killer Instinct	Cecilia Johnson	1 episode
2005	E-Ring	Lieutenant	1 episode
2006	Cold Case	Libby Bradley (1979)	1 episode
2006	Boston Legal	Ellen Tanner	1 episode
2007	Supernatural	Susan Thompson	Episode: "Playthings"
2007	General Hospital	Amelia Joffe	Recurring role
2007	Journeyman	Diana Bloom	1 episode
2009–2010	24	Renee Walker	Main role
2010	CSI: Crime Scene Investigation	Priscilla Prescott	1 episode
2010	NCIS	Gail Walsh	1 episode
2011	No Ordinary Family	Michelle Cotton	1 episode
2011	Rizzoli & Isles	Nicole Mateo	1 episode
2011	Hawaii Five-0	Samantha Martell	1 episode
2012	Harry's Law	Patricia Stanhope	1 episode
2012	Blue Eyed Butcher	Allie	Television film
2013	Body of Proof	Yvonne Kurtz	2 episodes
2013	Dallas	Alison Jones	4 episodes
2013	The Surrogate	Allison Kelly	Television film
2013	Touch	Kate Gordon	1 episode
2013	Revolution	Emma	2 episodes
2013; 2015	Castle	Kelly Nieman	3 episodes
2014–2016; 2021	Bosch	Julia Brasher	Main role (seasons 1–2); guest role (season 7)
2014	Intelligence	Kate Anderson	1 episode
2014	Blue Bloods	Joyce Carpenter	1 episode
2014	Extant	Femi Dodd	Recurring role
2015–2016	The Vampire Diaries	Lily Salvatore	Recurring role
2016	Code Black	Katie Miller	1 episode
2016	The Catch	Karen Singh	1 episode
2016	Major Crimes	Liz Soto	1 episode
2017–2018	Timeless	Emma Whitmore	Recurring role
2017	Doubt	Bonnie Harris	1 episode
2017	The Other Mother	Jackie McClain	Television film
2017–2019	Runaways	Leslie Dean	Main role
2018	Hell's Kitchen	Herself	1 episode
2019–2022	The Rookie	Rosalind Dyer	Recurring role
2022	Star Trek: Picard	Borg Queen	Recurring role

=== Video games ===
Year	Title	Voice role	Notes
2013	The Last of Us	Tess	Also performance capture
2019	Anthem	Tassyn	Also performance capture
