= Kayla Maisonet =

American actress (born 1999)

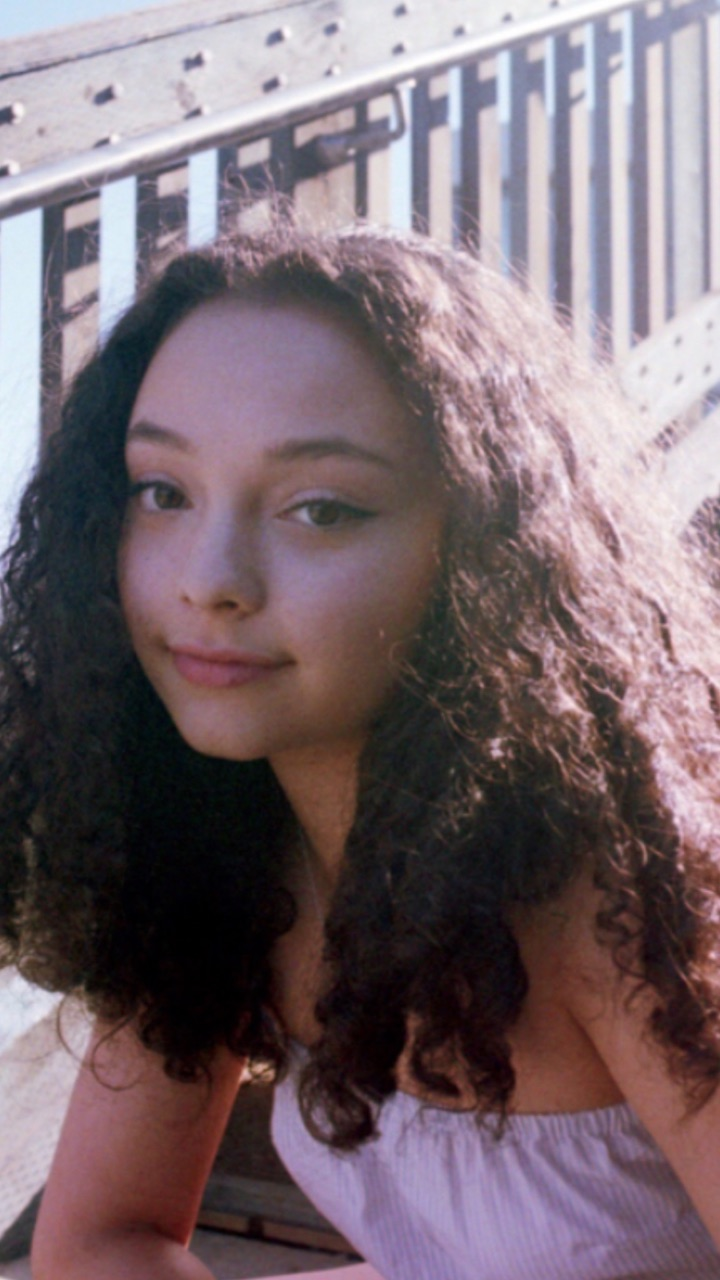
- Maisonet in 2017
- Born: Kayla Rose Maisonet; June 27, 1999 (age 27); New York City, New York, U.S.
- Occupation: Actress
- Years active: 2012–present

Kayla Rose Maisonet (born June 20, 1999) is an American actress and influencer. She portrayed Georgie Diaz in the Disney Channel sitcom Stuck in the Middle, and Lindsay in the Disney Channel sitcom Dog with a Blog, and Izzy on the ABC sitcom Speechless.

== Early life ==
Maisonet was born in New York City on June 20, 1999. Her parents are of Russian and Puerto Rican descent. Maisonet grew up in Freehold Township, New Jersey.

== Career ==
Before acting in shows, she worked on print, commercials, and theatre in Manhattan. She began acting in 2011. Her first appearance was in a short film called A New York Fairy Tale. In 2012, she worked on the television pilot Shmagreggie Saves The World, which later went unsold.

Maisonet landed a recurring role in the Disney Channel series Dog with a Blog playing the recurring character Lindsay, Avery's best friend, which she held throughout the show's run. For her role, in 2014, she won a Young Artist Award. In 2013, Maisonet also had a recurring role on the Nickelodeon series The Haunted Hathaways as Lilly.

In 2016, Maisonet was cast in the main role of Georgie Diaz on the Disney Channel sitcom Stuck in the Middle, which ran until 2018. In 2018, she had a recurring role as Izzy on the comedy television series Speechless, which she played for nine episodes.

== Filmography ==
Television roles
Year	Title	Role	Notes
2012	Shmagreggie Saves the World	TMC	Unsold television pilot
2012–2015	Dog with a Blog	Lindsay	Recurring role, 20 episodes
2013	The Haunted Hathaways	Lilly	Recurring role, 3 episodes
2015	Mulaney	Teen Girl	Episode: "Ruby"
2016–2018	Stuck in the Middle	Georgie Diaz	Main role
2018–2019	Speechless	Izzy	Recurring role, 9 episodes
2018	Crazy Ex-Girlfriend	Vanessa Rodriguez	Guest Star
2021	Diary of a Future President	Stephanie MacKenzie	Guest Star
2022	All Rise	Gloria Hernandez	2 episodes
2025-2026	NCIS: Origins	Nadia	4 episodes
2025	The Rookie	Livy	Episode: "April Fools"
2025	Get Off My Lawn	Ray	
2026	Elle	Tiffany	3 episodes

== Awards and nominations ==
Year	Award	Category	Work	Result	Ref
2014	35th Young Artist Awards	Best Performance in a TV Series – Recurring Young Actress	Dog with a Blog	Won	
