= Critters (franchise) =

American film franchise

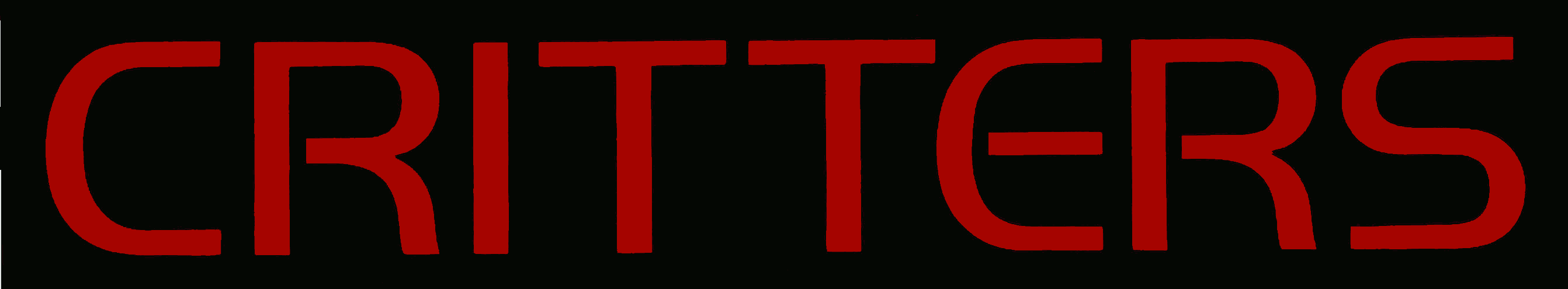
- Logo
- Based on: Characters created by Domonic Muir
- Distributed by: Warner Bros. (New Line Cinema)
- Country: United States
- Language: English

The Critters franchise includes American science fiction comedy-horror installments consisting of five feature films, and one television series. The original film was released in 1986 and received "two thumbs up" from Siskel and Ebert.

Although widely believed to have been made to cash in on the success of the similarly themed Gremlins, director Stephen Herek had refuted this in interviews, pointing out that the first Critters script was written by Domonic Muir long before Gremlins went into production, and subsequently underwent rewrites to reduce the similarities between the two films.

The series is about a group of malevolent carnivorous extraterrestrials called Krites (better known as Critters, the term the franchise is associated with) that have the power to roll into balls similar to hedgehogs and form into a giant sphere that can roll across a landscape. The individual Krites resemble small animals that are furry and spiky with large mouths filled with rows of sharp teeth. Throughout the franchise, they eat anything in sight, including human beings. The spikes on their backs can be launched as projectiles that render the victim unconscious. Krites come in black, brown, and navy blue. In the first film, they were also able to grow to a much larger size, but this ability was dropped in later installments.

The storyline for the first two films involves alien bounty hunters who hunt the Krites in a small American town. The setting for the third movie is a city, and the fourth film takes place on a space station.

The Krites exist solely to eat and breed; the main human characters in the films endeavor to survive and defeat them. The creature effects work was done by The Chiodo Brothers, who later went on to make Killer Klowns from Outer Space. Terrence Mann appears in all four films as an interstellar bounty hunter named Ug, as does Don Keith Opper as Charlie, an alcoholic who rises to the occasion when called upon to defend humankind. Leonardo DiCaprio appeared in Critters 3, and Dee Wallace-Stone and Billy Zane both appeared in the first installment. Scott Grimes starred in the first two films as Bradley Brown.

== Films ==
Film	U.S. release date	Director	Screenwriter(s)	Story by	Producer(s)
Critters	April 11, 1986	Stephen Herek	Dominic Muir & Stephen Herek and Don Opper	Dominic Muir	Rupert Harvey
Critters 2: The Main Course	April 29, 1988	Mick Garris	D.T. Twohy and Mick Garris	D.T. Twohy and Mick Garris	Barry Opper
Critters 3	December 11, 1991	Kristine Peterson	David J. Schow	Rupert Harvey & Barry Opper	Rupert Harvey and Barry Opper
Critters 4	October 14, 1992	Rupert Harvey	David J. Schow & Joseph Lyle	Rupert Harvey & Barry Opper	Rupert Harvey and Barry Opper
Critters Attack!	July 23, 2019	Bobby Miller	Scott Lobdell	Scott Lobdell	Rupert Harvey and Barry Opper

== Television ==
Series	Season	Episodes	First released	Last released	Showrunner(s)	Network(s)
Critters: A New Binge	1	8	March 21, 2019	March 21, 2019		Shudder

=== Critters: A New Binge (2019) ===
Critters: A New Binge was shot in Canada in mid-2018. Filming wrapped in Vancouver. Serving as a reboot, the series shows the creatures, pursued by intergalactic bounty hunters, returning to Earth on a secret mission. The series premiered on Shudder on March 21, 2019.

== Main cast and characters ==
The following is a list of cast and characters that appear in the Critters series.

Characters	Films					Television series
Characters	Critters	Critters 2: The Main Course	Critters 3	Critters 4	Critters Attack!	Critters: A New Binge
Crites	Corey Burton^{V}	Mick Garris^{V}	The Chiodo Brothers^{V}	The Chiodo Brothers^{V}	Steve Blum^{V}	Stephen Merchant^{V} Jim Meskimen^{V} Jacob Flack^{V} Mark Steger^{V} A.J. LoCascio^{V}
Charlie McFadden	Don Keith Opper	Don Keith Opper	Don Keith Opper	Don Keith Opper		
Ug	Terrence Mann	Terrence Mann	Terrence Mann	Terrence Mann		
Bradley Brown	Scott Grimes	Scott Grimes				
Helen Brown	Dee Wallace-Stone	Mentioned			Dee Wallace (as Aunt Dee)	
Jay Brown	Billy Green Bush	Mentioned				
April Brown	Nadine Van der Velde	Mentioned				
Sheriff Harvey "Harv"	M. Emmet Walsh	Barry Corbin				
Sally	Lin Shaye	Lin Shaye				
Lee	Ethan Phillips Jeremy Lawrence Don Keith Opper	Roxanne Kernohan Gregory Patrick				
Steve Elliot	Billy Zane					
Jeff Barnes	Ethan Phillips					
Reverend Miller	Jeremy Lawrence					
Megan Morgan		Liane Alexandra Curtis				
Wesley		Tom Hodges				
Nana		Herta Ware				
Hungry Heifer Manager		Eddie Deezen				
Josh			Leonardo DiCaprio			
Annie			Aimee Brooks			
Clifford			John Calvin			
Betty Briggs			Nina Axelrod			
Fran				Angela Bassett		
Al Bert				Brad Dourif		
Dr. McCormick				Anne Ramsay		
Ethan				Paul Whitthorne		
Cpt. Rick				Anders Hove		

== The Critters ==
The central focus of the series is upon a group of malevolent carnivorous extraterrestrials called Krites, which are known as Critters. They have the ability to roll into balls similar to hedgehogs and form into a sphere that can roll across the landscape.

=== Organization ===
In the first film, the largest Krite took leadership over the others. This is carried over into the second film where, though later turning out to be Ug in disguise, the largest Krite was seen as the leader once more, being able to persuade the immense pack of smaller Krites to continue on to Polar Ice Burger instead of attacking the humans that were following behind them. Although the concept of the biggest Krites being the leader was dropped in Critters 3, the Krite whose face was burned by bleach is shown leading the group throughout most of the film and is the last Krite to be killed. Because the fourth film only has two main Krite characters, it is difficult to determine if a lead Krite is being suggested, although one Krite (the one who had the top of its headshot bald by Charlie when it was a hatchling) is shown as ordering around the other Critters.

=== Appearance ===
Krites have been described as porcupines, rats, badgers, opossums, hedgehogs, rabid cats, Tasmanian devils, and a slew of other similar creatures.

The appearances of the Krites vary from film to film. In the first film, they appear to be much smaller than in later installments (save for the lead Krite) and not as furry. Their stomachs are fully revealed, whereas, in the sequels, they are covered completely by fur. Their fur appears more slicked back instead of wild or spiky like in the sequels, and their teeth appear more needle-like than in future installments. In one scene in the original film, a Krite's eyes appear to be orange instead of the bleeding red seen throughout the rest of the film, but this look is never repeated.

In the second film, the Krites appear larger than in the first film, have larger teeth, with fur (thicker and more haphazard than their predecessors) covering their entire bodies except for their arms and legs. Also, their poisonous darts are much bigger.

In the third and fourth films, the Krites look about the same in every aspect, although their eyes appear duller in the latter film.

In the reboot, the Krites have an appearance similar to their design from the first film. Their hair is a lot messier, their teeth got smaller, and their stomachs became hairless again. Some of them also have bald heads.

=== Reproduction ===
Not much is mentioned regarding the reproduction habits of the Krites, as no information is shown in the films or given in interviews by the creators. They are portrayed with a need to eat before laying eggs, but how they produce eggs in the first place is never revealed. No mating rituals are shown or discussed in the films.

In Critters 4, Charlie tells Fran that it takes six months for Krite eggs to incubate. This is contradicted in the previous installment, when the eggs from the beginning of the film hatch in what appears to be a span of just a few hours, and in the second film, where eggs laid in the first film appear to have remained dormant for two years before they were found. How many eggs a Krite can produce at one time is not revealed.

It may be that temperature has an effect on Krite eggs, seeing as the eggs in Critters 2 and Critters 3 seemingly hatch in response to close proximity to heat (a heater and the underside of a truck, respectively). This also appears to be a factor in Critters 4 and Critters 2 in which the eggs lie dormant when cryogenically frozen or left in a cold drafty barn and hatch almost immediately when exposed to a warmer temperature. Extremely cold temperatures also seem to have a detrimental effect on eggs, as hairless hatchling Krites are shown in Critters 4 when the eggs are laid in a cold incubator.

=== Diet ===
Krites are exclusively carnivorous. The idea that is eating more and more increases the Krite's size, eventually leading to a Krite becoming the alpha or dominant in its group, is suggested only in the first film and may be a sign of Krite maturity, as the Krites in the first film are much older than the Krites in the subsequent films.

=== Hunting habits ===
Krites are normally seen to hunt and attack in groups. Rarely has a Krite been shown to attack on its own outside of the few occasions in the first and fourth films. Charlie explains in the fourth film that Krites generally go for a victim's face and neck, although the films show them attacking the chest and gut area of a victim more often than not. Once a victim is caught, usually one Krite initiates the attack, and the others quickly follow in one swift barrage.

Krites' only weapons are the natural weapons built into their bodies. One such mechanism is the ability to shoot a poisonous barb like a projectile at a victim. The barb injects a type of poison into the victim's bloodstream, causing the victim to fall asleep or unconscious for an unspecified amount of time. It is shown that removing the barb awakens the victim. It is not revealed whether these barbs affect other Krites. The fourth film is the only film in which the Krites do not utilize their poison barbs. The size and thickness of the barbs vary from film to film.

Another mechanism is their rather large mouth filled with rows of sharp teeth. A Krite's bite is shown to be extremely effective and difficult to extricate. In most cases, a victim is forced to beat on the Krite's snout-like that of a great white shark or crocodile, or stab the Krite with sharp objects enough that it releases its hold.

The second film introduces the giant Critter ball—an enormous sphere of Krites all latched onto each other to move as one single unit. Not much is revealed about this mechanism, except that it enables the herd to survive a factory explosion and being rammed by a pickup truck, but not the direct impact of a bounty hunter space ship. It is only used in the second film.

The Krites in the third film are shown launching themselves straight up into the air, as seen when one of the Krites launches itself up a laundry chute in an attempt to attack Rosalie. A variation is shown at the end of the film, when a Krite tucks itself into a ball and revvs up as a means of attack.

While never shown to be used, Krites also have three sharp claws on their hands and feet.

=== Intelligence ===
Throughout the series, Krites are shown to have varying degrees of learning and intelligence. In the first film, the Krites escape from a seemingly highly advanced prison asteroid where they are to be executed by hijacking a spaceship. Although the Krites fall for the trap set for them at Polar Ice Burger in the second film (which could perhaps be attributed to a disguised Ug persuading them to go), they are shown forming into a giant sphere and saving themselves from impending destruction, although this action could be viewed as being based on instinct. In the third film, the Krites formulate a successful plan to infiltrate a room where humans have locked themselves by moving through the ventilation system. In the same film, once the humans moved up to the attic and blockaded the door, the Krites opted to move up the elevator shaft to get to them. Critters 4 shows the Krites being able to easily use a space station's core control computer and change the navigation course from an unknown planet to Earth. The film also shows them being able to use the growth accelerator in one of the labs to genetically enhance their offspring.

== Additional crew and production details ==
Film	Crew/Detail					
Film	Composer(s)	Cinematographer	Editor(s)	Production companies	Distributing companies	Running time
Critters	David Newman	Tim Suhrstedt	Larry Bock	Sho Films	New Line Cinema	1hr 25mins
Critters 2: The Main Course	Nicholas Pike	Russell Carpenter	Charles Bornstein	New Line Cinema, Sho Films	New Line Cinema	1hr 25mins
Critters 3	David C. Williams	Thomas L. Callaway	Terry Stokes	New Line Cinema, OH Films	New Line Home Video	1hr 25mins
Critters 4	Peter Manning Robinson	Thomas L. Callaway	Terry Stokes	New Line Cinema, OH Films	New Line Home Video	1hr 34mins
Critters Attack!	Russ Howard III	Hein de Vos	Mike Mendez	Blue Ribbon Content, New Line Cinema, Warner Bros. Television, Syfy Original Film	Warner Bros. Home Entertainment	1hr 29mins
Critters: A New Binge	Al Kaplan & Jon Kaplan	Adam Sliwinski	Daniel Missirlian & Evan Nix	Blue Ribbon Content, Abominable Pictures, Shudder Original Series	Shudder	1hr 20mins 10min episodes)
