= Critters 2: The Main Course =

- Theatrical release poster
- Directed by: Mick Garris
- Written by: David Twohy; Mick Garris
- Produced by: Barry Opper
- Starring: Scott Grimes; Liane Curtis; Don Opper; Barry Corbin; Terrence Mann
- Cinematography: Russell Carpenter
- Edited by: Charles Bornstein
- Music by: Nicholas Pike
- Production company: Sho Films
- Distributed by: New Line Cinema
- Release date: April 29, 1988
- Running time: 85 minutes
- Country: United States
- Language: English
- Budget: $4 million
- Box office: $3.8 million (US)

Critters 2: The Main Course (also known as Critters 2) is a 1988 American science fiction comedy horror film directed by Mick Garris in his directorial debut, and the second installment in the Critters franchise. A direct sequel to Critters (1986), the film was written by David Twohy and Garris, and stars Scott Grimes, Don Keith Opper and Terrence Mann reprising their roles. The plot takes place two years after the first film, as a batch of planted Critter eggs begin to hatch and resume their carnivorous appetite upon the town once again.

Although it did not gross as much as the original, the sequel grossed $3.8 million during its theatrical run in the United States. It is the last installment in the series to be released theatrically and is followed by Critters 3 in 1991.

== Plot ==
Out in space on a desolate planet, the shape-shifting bounty hunters Ug and Lee and their human companion Charlie McFadden search for a vicious, worm-like creature. After killing the beast, they depart the planet. Soon afterwards, they receive a new assignment by Zanti, head of the High Council. He tells them that Krites have been detected on Earth and must be destroyed at once. With that, they set a course for Earth, but Ug notices Charlie is brooding, and he enquires what is wrong. Charlie states his reluctance to going back to Earth after two years and asks whether they will leave him there. Ug assures him they have no such intentions.

Back on Earth, Brad Brown, now 15, is visiting his grandmother in Grover's Bend, Kansas. Word gets around the town fast, implying he became well known after the events of the first film. Meanwhile, a man named Mr. Quigley sells strange eggs to Brad's grandmother for Easter celebration however unbeknownst to them, the eggs are actually Crite eggs. Shortly after selling the eggs, Mr Quigley leaves the rest of the Crite eggs next to a furnace, which causes them to start to hatch. The next day, when Mr. Quigley comes back to his shed he finds the eggs in pieces and his dog dead. The newly hatched baby Critters then appear to attack Quigley and kill him. Later, one of the Crite eggs bought by Brad's grandmother hatches and the Critter inside attempts to bite a young girl however, it is soon stepped on. After this, the town celebrates Easter in the church where the Crite eggs are put into a garden for the kids to hunt for. The eggs begin to hatch and the infant critters then attack the town's sheriff dressed as an Easter Bunny, killing him. No one is aware that it was the Critters who attacked him, as his death is attributed to a farming accident. Soon the bounty hunters land and Lee sees a magazine with a gorgeous, busty centerfold model (Roxanne Kernohan) and takes on her visage. Meanwhile, Brad and his friend Megan are driving down the road when the encounter a woman who tells them that something is wrong inside Quigley's shed. They go to the shed and Brad knocks on the door. When there is no answer, he attempts to get back into the car but the door slams open and Mr Quigley's mutilated body falls on him. Full grown Critters then begin to attack the car, however Megan, Brad, and the woman escape and the critters then advance toward the town. Eventually the Critters make themselves known when they begin terrorizing the town, growing in large numbers. Lee is killed and devoured by the Critters when they set a trap, causing Ug to slip into a deep depression and revert to his alien form.

The remaining people of the town devise a plan. With Ug polymorphed into a large Krite, they lead the Critters to a burger factory in an attempt to blow them up. The plan fails and the Critters emerge joined into a large ball and begin heading to the church. Just before they reach it, Charlie flies directly into them with Ug's spaceship, successfully destroying the Critters and seemingly sacrificing himself. Ug subsequently takes on Charlie's facial features in honor of his bravery. The next day, as Brad departs, it is revealed that Charlie survived by using a parachute. He stays on Earth, becoming sheriff of Grover's Bend. Ug departs in a new spacecraft, still wearing the guise of Charlie.

== Cast ==
- Scott Grimes as Brad Brown
- Terrence Mann as Ug
- Liane Alexandra Curtis as Megan Morgan
- Don Keith Opper as Charlie McFadden
- Barry Corbin as Sheriff Harvey "Harv"
- Tom Hodges as Wesley
- Sam Anderson as Mr. Morgan
- Lindsay Parker as Cindy
- Herta Ware as Nana
- Lin Shaye as Sal
- Roxanne Kernohan as Lee
- Douglas Rowe as Quigley
- Eddie Deezen as Hungry Heifer Manager
- Mick Garris as Critter voices
- William Hanna as Critters' screams and shrieks

== Production ==
Mick Garris was set to write and direct The Fly II and wrote multiple drafts of the film, but after losing patience with the production Garris left and joined Critters 2 due to liking the script and New Line Cinema offering him creative input.

Garris got the chance to direct after having worked for Steven Spielberg on the television series Amazing Stories as a screenwriter. Garris initially turned down the offer to direct, but later accepted, citing that he was a big fan of the first movie and wanted to make the sequel a more scary film than the first. The Chiodo Brothers, who served as special effects artists on the first film, returned to create the titular creatures, creating over 50 puppets for the film.

The film was shot in Valencia, Santa Clarita, a part of the Los Angeles metropolitan area.

== Release ==
The film was released theatrically in the United States by New Line Cinema in April 1988. It grossed $3.8 million at the box office and was the last film in the series to be released theatrically.

The film was released on VHS and laserdisc by New Line Home Video later the same year. In 2003, New Line Home Entertainment released the film on DVD. The film was re-released in a set containing all four Critters films on DVD by Warner Bros. in 2010.

Scream Factory, a subsidiary of Shout! Factory, released the four films as part of "The Critters Collection" on Blu-ray. The set was released on November 27, 2018.

== Reception ==
Rotten Tomatoes reports that 36% of 14 surveyed critics gave the film a positive review. Film critic Roger Ebert gave the film 1 out of 4 stars: "It lacks all of the style and sense of fun of the original Critters (1986) and has no reason for existence".

Discussing the film several years after its release, writer David Twohy said in an interview with Starlog that "Critters 2 is something I'm still not terribly pleased is on my résumé".

== Sequels ==
Critters 2: The Main Course was followed by Critters 3 and Critters 4, directed by Kristine Peterson and Rupert Harvey, respectively.

== See also ==
- Sweets and Sour Marge
