= Innards =

Innards is a term used broadly to refer to the 'insides' of something, but may also refer to:

- Offal
- Viscera
- Gastrointestinal tract
- Innards: The Metaphysical Highway, a short film by the Chiodo Brothers
