= Critters Attack! =

2019 American horror film

- DVD cover
- Directed by: Bobby Miller
- Written by: Scott Lobdell
- Based on: Critters by Domonic Muir
- Produced by: Rupert Harvey; Barry Opper
- Starring: Tashiana Washington; Dee Wallace
- Cinematography: Hein de Vos
- Edited by: Mike Mendez
- Music by: Russ Howard III
- Production companies: Blue Ribbon Content; New Line Cinema; Blue Ice Pictures; Triton Media
- Distributed by: Warner Bros. Home Entertainment
- Release dates: July 13, 2019 (Fantasia International Film Festival); July 23, 2019 (home media release)
- Running time: 89 minutes
- Country: United States
- Language: English

Critters Attack! is a 2019 horror comedy film. It is a reboot of the 1986 film Critters, and the fifth entry in the Critters franchise. Although returning actress Dee Wallace was assumed to be portraying a new heroine distinct from her Helen Brown character, Wallace herself confirmed that she was reprising the original role, with a name change to "Aunt Dee" due to potential legal issues.

== Plot ==
While babysitting two teenagers, college student Drea discovers that the alien Crites have landed in a nearby forest. They soon receive assistance from the mysterious Aunt Dee, who may have a history with the hungry intergalactic beasts. The teenagers also encounter a white alien Crite named Bianca.

== Cast ==
- Tashiana Washington as Drea
- Dee Wallace as Aunt Dee
- Jaeden Noel as Phillip
- Jack Fulton as Jake
- Ava Preston as Trissy
- Leon Clingman as Ranger Bob
- Vash Singh as Kevin Loong
- Stephen Jennings as Sheriff Lewis Haines
- Steve Blum as Critter voices

== Production ==
SYFY acquired the broadcasting rights to the Critters franchise in order to produce new sequels in autumn 2018. The fifth entry began filming secretly in February 2019, in South Africa. Critters Attack! was officially announced two months later.

== Release ==
The film was released on DVD disc and digital viewing on July 23, 2019 by Warner Bros. Home Entertainment. Unlike other Critters films, which were all rated PG-13, the film was released in an Unrated and a standard R-rated version due to having more blood and violence.

== Reception ==
The film received mixed reviews. On Rotten Tomatoes, the film holds an approval rating of 41% based 17 reviews. Bloody Disgusting gave the film two out of five skulls, stating, "the fifth film suffers from a bland cast of characters, poor pacing and, most significantly, a lack of campy fun." Film School Rejects noted that the film was better than Critters: A New Binge, and described it as "a mildly entertaining creature feature that will likely find its way into the viewing habits of today's young, burgeoning horror fans when they stumble upon it on television one evening."
