= Tim Suhrstedt =

American cinematographer

- Born: August 5, 1948 (age 78); Baltimore, Maryland, U.S.
- Years active: 1976–present
- Spouse: Deborah L. Scott

Timothy Suhrstedt, ASC (born August 5, 1948) is an American cinematographer, best known for his work in comedy films.

== Filmography ==
=== Film ===
Feature film

Year	Title	Director	Notes
1980	Go West, Young Man	Urs Egger	
1982	Forbidden World	Allan Holzman	
1982	Android	Aaron Lipstadt	
1983	The House on Sorority Row	Mark Rosman	
1983	Suburbia	Penelope Spheeris	
1983	Forever and Beyond	Thomas Flood	
1984	City Limits	Aaron Lipstadt	
1985	Teen Wolf	Rod Daniel	
1985	Stand Alone	Alan Beattie	With Tom Richmond
1985	Space Rage	Conrad E. Palmisano	With Tom Richmond
1986	Critters	Stephen Herek	
1986	Vicious Lips	Albert Pyun	
1987	Mannequin	Michael Gottlieb	
1988	Split Decisions	David Drury	
1988	Remote Control	Jeff Lieberman	
1988	Doin' Time on Planet Earth	Charles Matthau	
1988	Mystic Pizza	Donald Petrie	
1988	Feds	Daniel Goldberg	
1989	Bill & Ted's Excellent Adventure	Stephen Herek	
1990	Men at Work	Emilio Estevez	
1991	Don't Tell Mom the Babysitter's Dead	Stephen Herek	
1992	Noises Off	Peter Bogdanovich	
1992	Traces of Red	Andy Wolk	
1994	The Favor	Donald Petrie	
1994	Getting Even with Dad	Howard Deutch	
1996	To Gillian on Her 37th Birthday	Michael Pressman	
1998	The Wedding Singer	Frank Coraci	
1998	Major League: Back to the Minors	John Warren	
1999	Office Space	Mike Judge	
2000	Whatever It Takes	David Raynr	
2001	Summer Catch	Michael Tollin	
2002	Pumpkin	Anthony Abrams; Adam Larson Broder	
2002	Clockstoppers	Jonathan Frakes	
2002	Frank McKlusky, C.I.	Arlene Sanford	With Jeffrey Greeley
2002	The Hot Chick	Tom Brady	
2006	Little Miss Sunshine	Jonathan Dayton; Valerie Faris	
2006	Relative Strangers	Greg Glienna	
2006	Idiocracy	Mike Judge	
2006	The Last Time	Michael Caleo	
2007	The Brothers Solomon	Bob Odenkirk	
2009	17 Again	Burr Steers	
2009	The Marc Pease Experience	Todd Louiso	
2009	Extract	Mike Judge	
2009	All About Steve	Phil Traill	
2009	The Invention of Lying	Ricky Gervais; Matthew Robinson	
2012	Vamps	Amy Heckerling	
2013	As Cool as I Am	Max Mayer	
2013	Paradise	Diablo Cody	
2014	Better Living Through Chemistry	David Posamentier; Geoff Moore	
2014	50 to 1	Jim Wilson	
2014	Sex Tape	Jake Kasdan	
2015	Get Hard	Etan Cohen	
2017	Lucky	John Carroll Lynch	
2017	El Camino Christmas	David E. Talbert	
2018	Spivak	Anthony Abrams	
2019	Always Be My Maybe	Nahnatchka Khan	
2021	Vacation Friends	Clay Tarver	
2023	Maybe I Do	Michael Jacobs	
2023	Vacation Friends 2	Clay Tarver	
2026	Seekers of Infinite Love	Victoria Strouse	
2026	Diamond	Andy Garcia	

Documentary film

Year	Title	Director	Notes
1999	Fantasia 2000	Don Hahn	Concert film (Host sequences)
2016	The Beatles: Eight Days a Week	Ron Howard	With Caleb Deschanel, Paul Lang, Michael Wood and Jessica Young

=== Television ===
TV movies

Year	Title	Director	Notes
1984	The Ratings Game	Danny DeVito	
1985	And the Children Shall Lead	Michael Pressman	
1985	Orson Welles' Magic Show	Orson Welles	With Gary Graver
1986	Slow Burn	Matthew Chapman	
1987	J. Edgar Hoover	Robert L. Collins	
1988	Lady Mobster	John Llewellyn Moxey	
1988	Dead Solid Perfect	Bobby Roth	
1989	The Cover Girl and the Cop	Neal Israel	
1989	She Knows Too Much	Paul Lynch	
1989	The Revenge of Al Capone	Michael Pressman	
1989	Spooner	George T. Miller	
1989	Man Against the Mob: The Chinatown Murders	Michael Pressman	
1990	Pair of Aces	Aaron Lipstadt	
1990	Rainbow Drive	Bobby Roth	
1993	Country Estates	Donald Petrie	
1994	Rise and Walk: The Dennis Byrd Story	Michael Dinner	
1994	The Innocent	Mimi Leder	
2003	111 Gramercy Park	Bill D'Elia	
2007	The Line-Up	John Dahl	
2011	Truth Be Told	Jonathan Frakes	
2023	Office Race	Jared Lapidus	
