= Darrell Larson =

American actor (born 1950)

- Born: December 13, 1950 (age 75); Sacramento, California, U.S.
- Occupation: Actor
- Years active: 1970–present
- Spouse(s): Nancy C. Gertz (1971–1984) 1 child Susanna Styron (1984–present) 2 children

Darrell Ray Larson (born December 13, 1950) is an American film and television actor.

Larson's work includes roles in The Student Nurses (1970), Kotch (1971), The Magnificent Seven Ride! (1972), Futureworld (1976), Partners (1982) and Brainstorm (1983). He had prominent roles in the 1984 film Mike's Murder and the 1990 comedy Men at Work, and a small part in the 1996 film Eye for an Eye. Larson's television guest star appearances include Matlock, Designing Women, L.A. Law, Morningstar/Eveningstar, and Diagnosis Murder. He also appeared in Law & Order: Special Victims Unit.

== Filmography ==
=== Film ===
Year	Title	Role	Notes
1970	The Student Nurses	Greg	
1971	Kotch	Vincent Perrin	
1972	The Magnificent Seven Ride!	Shelly	
1972	Outside In	Ollie Wilson	
1976	Futureworld	Eric	
1979	The China Syndrome	Young Demonstrator	
1980	When Time Ran Out	Webster's Assistant	
1982	Partners	Al	
1982	Good-bye, Cruel World	Kevin	
1982	Android	Terrapol: Neptune	
1982	Frances	Louella's Spy	
1982	Six Weeks	Art Teacher	
1983	Brainstorm	Security Technician	
1984	Mike's Murder	Pete	
1984	UFOria	Toby	
1984	City Limits	Mick	
1985	Twice in a Lifetime	Jerry	
1989	Dead Aim	Mark Cain	
1990	Men at Work	Jack Berger	
1992	Hero	Freddy King	
1995	Stuart Saves His Family	Jerry	
1996	Eye for an Eye	Peter Green	
1998	Shadrach	Father	
1998	Pants on Fire	Ralph Blaylock	
1998	Stepmom	Duncan Samuels	
2002	Fresh Cut Grass	Father	
2004	Messengers	Dr. Max Overman	
2004	The Manchurian Candidate	FBI Agent Ramirez	
2005	Winter Passing	Director	
2005	Off the Black	Doctor	
2007	Light and the Sufferer	Speaker	
2008	Rachel Getting Married	12-Step Group Leader	
2008	The Wreck	Charles	
2010	13	Game Doctor	
2020	Kombucha Cure	Brian O'Hara	

=== Television ===
Year	Title	Role	Notes
1970	Dan August	Bernie Kahn	Episode: "Love Is a Nickel Bag"
1970	Room 222	Larry	Episode: "Adam's Lib"
1970	Bonanza	Brian Boyle	Episode: "Thornton's Account"
1970–1973	Marcus Welby, M.D.	Various roles	3 episodes
1971	The Bill Cosby Show	Chuck	Episode: "A Dirty Business"
1971	Congratulations, It's a Boy!	B.J.	Television film
1971	Owen Marshall, Counselor at Law	Poco Lewis	Episode: "Make No Mistake"
1972	Night Gallery	Elie Green	Episode: "There Aren't Any More MacBanes"
1972	Banyon	Donald Moore	Episode: "The Old College Try"
1972	Gunsmoke	Danny Stalcup	Episode: "The Fugitives"
1972	All My Darling Daughters	Andy O'Brien	ABC Movie of the Week
1973	The Girls of Huntington House	Sandy	ABC Movie of the Week
1973	My Darling Daughters' Anniversary	Andy O'Brien	ABC Movie of the Week
1974	Cannon	Steve Bowers	Episode: "The Stalker"
1976	Petrocelli	Al	Episode: "Blood Money"
1977	Westside Medical	Intern	3 episodes
1977	Kingston: Confidential	Wilton	Episode: "Dateline: Fear City"
1977	One Day at a Time	Ronnie Baxter	Episode: "Schneider's Kid"
1977–1981	Eight Is Enough	Dan Mulford / Stan Lewis	4 episodes
1978	Black Sheep Squadron	Lt. Ken Trapp	Episode: "Wolves in the Sheep Pen"
1978	Project U.F.O.	Danny Peterson	Episode: "Sighting 4005: The Medicine Bow Incident"
1980	Mrs. Columbo	Les Laykin	Episode: "Love, on Instant Replay"
1983	Faerie Tale Theatre	Chris	Episode: "Little Red Riding Hood"
1986	Miracle of the Heart: A Boys Town Story	Hank Grogan	Television film
1986	Morningstar/Eveningstar	Bob Lane	7 episodes
1986	L.A. Law	Tim Stanton	Episode: "Sidney, the Dead-Nosed Reindeer"
1987	The Last Innocent Man	Philip Stafford	Television film
1987	Murder Ordained	Ronald Stark	Television film
1987	Matlock	Dr. Jackson	Episode: "The Doctors"
1987	Mistress	Bobby North	Television film
1988	Perry Mason: The Case of the Lady in the Lake	Skip Wingate	Television film
1988	The Days and Nights of Molly Dodd	Dwight Bickford	2 episodes
1988–1989	HeartBeat	Dr. Paul Jared	18 episodes
1990	Fine Things	Chandler Scott	Television film
1991	Designing Women	Garret Rossler	Episode: "Blame It on New Orleans"
1991	Shannon's Deal	Peter J. Reilly	Episode: "The Bad Beat"
1991	The Young Riders	Fitzgerald	Episode: "A House Divided"
1993–2004	Law & Order	Various roles	3 episodes
1994	Diagnosis: Murder	Paul Dunbar	Episode: "Broadcast Blues"
1994	Party of Five	Ed Brighton	Episode: "Something Out of Nothing"
1995	Sisters	Kenny Stepinek	2 episodes
1995	New York News	Dr. Canin	Episode: "Good-Bye Gator"
1996	The Lazarus Man	Griffin Henry	Episode: "The Hold-Up"
2001	100 Centre Street	Alex Hoffman	Episode: "Bottlecaps"
2006	Conviction	Professor	Episode: "Pilot"
2010	Law & Order: Special Victims Unit	Preacher	Episode: "Behave"
2020	The Church of Mike	Jim Akers	Episode: "The Church of Mike"
