= The Chiodo Brothers =

American puppeteers and special effects artists

The Chiodo Bros.
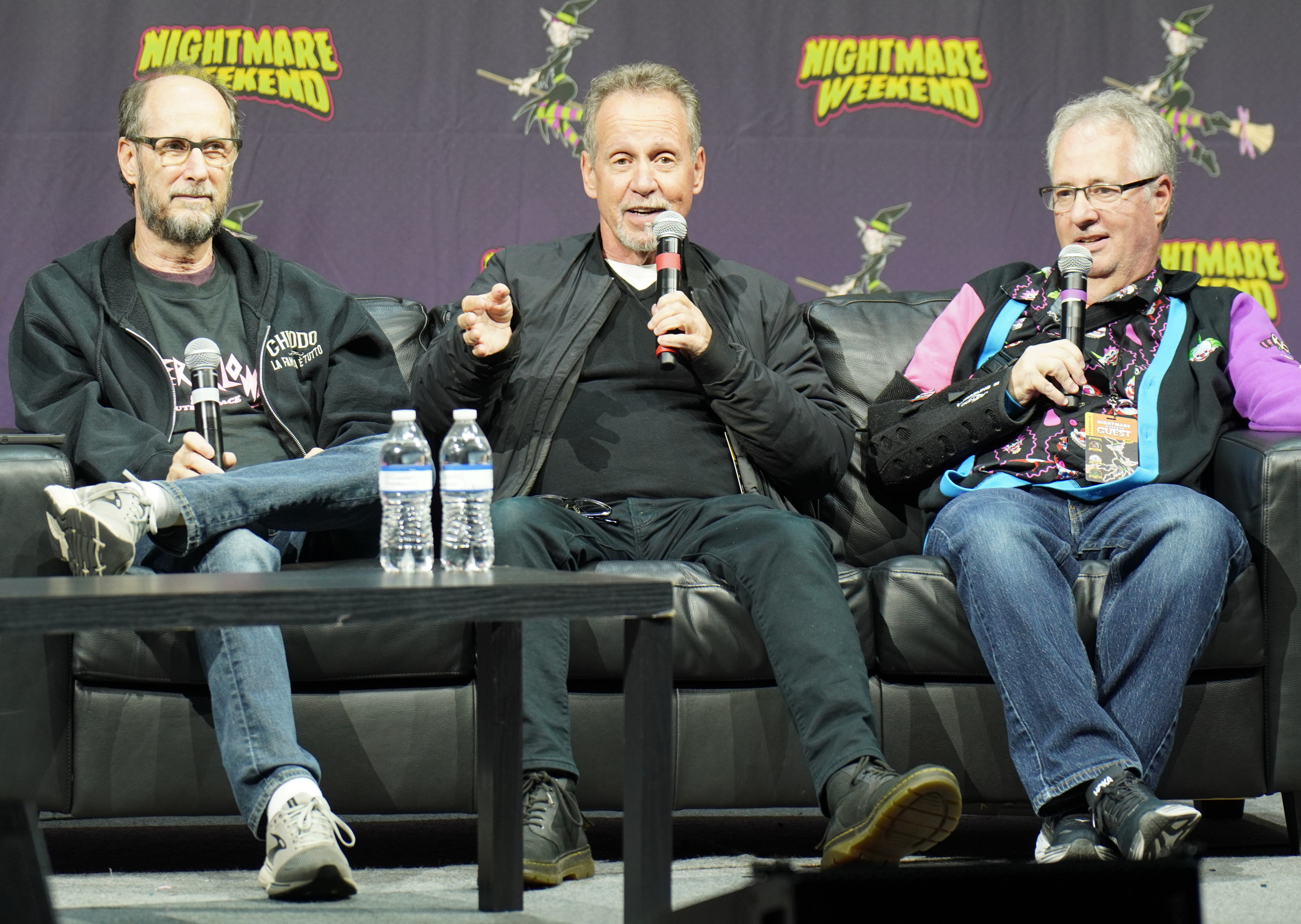
- From left to right: Stephen Chiodo, Charles Chiodo, and Edward Chiodo
- Born: Charles Anthony Chiodo; May 24, 1952 (age 74); Stephen Joseph Chiodo; March 2, 1954 (age 72); Edward Michael Chiodo; August 25, 1960 (age 66); Bronx, New York, U.S.
- Occupation: Special effects artists
- Years active: 1982-present

The Chiodo Brothers (Stephen, Charles & Edward Chiodo; /kiˈoʊdoʊ/; born in Bronx (raised in Deer Park) New York, are an American trio of sibling special effects artists, specializing in clay modeling, creature creation, stop motion and animatronics. Known for their film Killer Klowns from Outer Space and creating puppets and effects for films such as Critters, Ernest Scared Stupid, and Team America: World Police, the Chiodo brothers created the claymation sequence for the Large Marge scene from Pee-wee's Big Adventure, and the stop-motion elements in the North Pole scenes from Elf. They also created the mouse dioramas featured in the 2010 film Dinner for Schmucks, as well as the stop-motion Stone Age creatures in the Cup Noodles ads from the mid-90s and were puppeteers on The Thundermans. In addition, they produced a puppet segment for the episode of The Simpsons "The Fight Before Christmas" (2010). The band Chiodos was originally named "The Chiodos Bros." after them, before modifying their title slightly.

Their studio has made clay animation segments for five episodes of The Simpsons:

- A parody of Davey and Goliath for "HOMR" (2001).
- Parodies of The California Raisins and Santa Claus Is Comin' to Town for "'Tis the Fifteenth Season" (2003).
- A couch gag featuring Gumby for "The Girl Who Slept Too Little" (2005).
- A parody of Wallace and Gromit for "Angry Dad: The Movie" (2011).
- A nightmare sequence parodying Davey and Goliath for "Ned 'n' Edna's Blend Agenda" (2012).

On August 23, 2019, it was announced that the Chiodo Brothers were developing a stop-motion animated television special adaptation of the 2006 book Alien Xmas, written by Stephen Chiodo and Jim Strain, for Netflix with executive producer Jon Favreau. The adaptation, also titled Alien Xmas, was released on Netflix on November 20, 2020.

== Credited special effects ==
- Flicks (1983) – character masks
- Critters (1986) – critter designer and supervisor
- Faerie Tale Theatre (1986, TV series; 1 episode) – models and effects
- RoboCop-6000 SUX commercial (1987, movie)
- Critters 2 (1988) – design and supervision: Chiodo Brothers Production, Inc
- UHF (1988) – Clay Animation: Chiodo Bros. Production
- Monsters (1988, TV series; 1 episode) – monster creator
- Critters 3 (1991) – design and supervision: critters crew
- Rubin and Ed (1991) – creator: Simon the Cat
- Ernest Scared Stupid (1991) – creature effects designer
- Adventures in Wonderland (1992) - The Cheshire Cat and Dormouse puppets
- Critters 4 (1992) – design and supervision: critters crew
- Zombie Dinos from Planet Zeltoid (1992) - special effects: dinosaur characters
- Crash the Curiousaurus [ABC Weekend Special] (1995) – special effects: Curiousaurus puppet costume costume
- Tales from the Hood (1995) - doll effects, KKK Comeuppance
- Masked Rider (1996) – special effects: Ferbus puppet and Maggot costumes
- The Stupids (1996) – stop motion animation: Chiodo Bros
- Turbo: A Power Rangers Movie (1997) – special effects: Lerigot, Yara, Bethel, Elgar, Rygog, Maligore puppets
- Ninja Turtles: The Next Mutation (1997-1998) – special effects: Turtles, puppets
- The Mr. Potato Head Show (1998–1999; 13 episodes) – puppet fabrication
- King Cobra (1999) – creature effects
- Demon Island (2002) – creature effects
- Elf (2003) – stop motion animation supervisor: Chiodo Bros
- Team America: World Police (2004) – puppet supervisor
- The Bite-Sized Adventures of Sam Sandwich (2012, TV series) – lead puppet fabricator
- 1982 (2013, Short) – special effects
- Alien Abduction (2014) – creature design
- Marcel the Shell With Shoes On (2021) - stop motion animation
