= Terrence Mann =

American actor (born 1951)

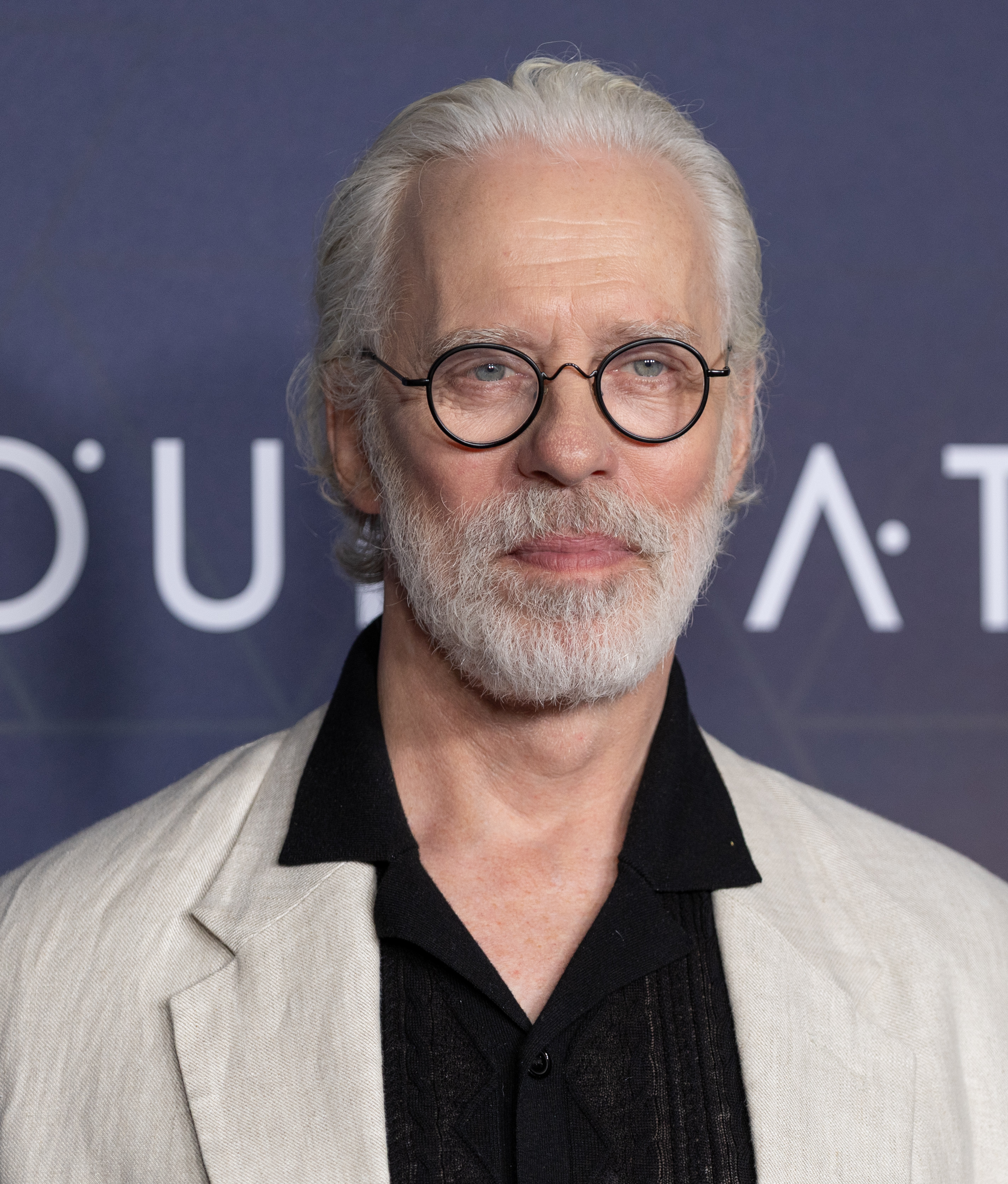
- Mann in 2025
- Born: Terrence Vaughan Mann; July 1, 1951 (age 75); Ashland, Kentucky, U.S.
- Education: Jacksonville University; North Carolina School of the Arts
- Occupations: Actor, singer
- Years active: 1970–present
- Known for: Cats; Les Misérables; Beauty and the Beast; Pippin
- Spouses: Juliette Bora (m. 1981; div. 1991); Charlotte d'Amboise (m. 1996)
- Children: 2
- Relatives: Christopher d'Amboise (brother-in-law)

Terrence Vaughan Mann (born July 1, 1951) is an American actor and baritone singer. He is best known for his appearances on the Broadway stage, which include Lyman in Barnum, The Rum Tum Tugger in Cats, Inspector Javert in Les Misérables, The Beast in Beauty and the Beast, Chauvelin in The Scarlet Pimpernel, Frank N. Furter in The Rocky Horror Show, Charlemagne in Pippin, Mal Beineke in The Addams Family, Charles Frohman / Captain James Hook in Finding Neverland, The Man in the Yellow Suit in Tuck Everlasting, and Meyer Wolfsheim in The Great Gatsby. He has received three Tony Award nominations, an Emmy Award nomination, and an Outer Critics Circle Award for Outstanding Actor in a Musical.

His film credits include the Critters series, A Chorus Line, Big Top Pee-wee, and Solarbabies. He also starred as the villain Whispers in the Netflix series Sense8 from 2015 to 2018. He is a distinguished professor of musical theatre at Western Carolina University, and is an artistic director of the Carolina Arts Festival and the North Carolina Theatre.

== Early life ==
Mann was born in Ashland, Kentucky, the eldest of three sons to Helen and Charles Mann. Mann's mother was a concert pianist, and his father sang in a barbershop quartet. Music was part of his growing up, so singing came naturally to him. But it was the multiple pleasures of the stage that drew him to the world of theater.

In an interview with the Hartford Courant, Mann said: "When I was doing the junior class play — it was called 'In Deadly Earnest' — at the end of a scene, the script said, 'They kiss.' It was then that I honestly thought, 'I'm going to be in the theater!' I was fascinated with having words put in my mouth and that someone would say something back to me that would get us to a moment where we ended up in a kiss. I remember when my school counselor asked me what I wanted to do, I said without hesitation, 'Go into the theater!'"

Mann grew up in Largo, Florida and he is a 1969 graduate of Largo High School. His first professional job came during his college years in Jacksonville University. For $35 a week, he was offered the job of performing in the annual outdoor theater spectacular The Lost Colony, during summers on the Outer banks of Manteo, North Carolina. It was here he met Joe Layton, who later was instrumental in getting him his first Broadway show.

Mann later attended the North Carolina School of the Arts, where his mentor was Malcolm Morrison, former dean at The Hartt School at the University of Hartford. For many years Mann was a regular at Morrison's North Carolina Shakespeare Festival.

== Career ==
Mann made his Broadway debut in 1980 in Barnum at the St. James Theatre, in the supporting role of Chester Lyman. He made his true break-through performance in the original Broadway cast of Andrew Lloyd Webber's Cats in 1982, in which he met and starred alongside his future wife, Charlotte d'Amboise. He created the memorable lead role of the "playful" cat Rum Tum Tugger. In 1985, Mann played assistant choreographer Larry in Richard Attenborough's film version of A Chorus Line.

In 1987, he played the role of Inspector Javert in the original Broadway cast of Les Misérables. His portrayal of Javert earned him his first Tony Award nomination for Best Actor in a Leading Role, a role which he would later reprise near the end of the musical's run at the Imperial Theatre in 2003. Mann returned to the role once more in June 2015, directing and starring as Javert in a staged concert of the show at the Connecticut Repertory Theatre, Storrs, Connecticut.

Mann earned his second Tony Award nomination for Actor in a Musical in 1994 for his portrayal of the Beast in Disney's Beauty and the Beast at the Palace Theater and reprised his role in the Los Angeles production in 1995 along with many of the original Broadway cast members. In 1997, Mann created the role of Chauvelin in the Frank Wildhorn musical The Scarlet Pimpernel on Broadway.

He has also starred in other musicals on Broadway including: Rags (1986), Jerome Robbins' Broadway (1989), Getting Away with Murder (1996) and the 2000 Broadway revival of The Rocky Horror Show (in which he played Frank-N-Furter, replacing Tom Hewitt in the role), in addition to the (then) Off-Broadway musical Assassins (1990) as Czolgosz.

He appeared in the first four Critters films as an alien bounty hunter named Ug. He starred in the television soap opera All My Children as Earl Boyd in 1997. Mann played "Old Tom" in Paul Green's outdoor drama The Lost Colony in North Carolina, and later returned to his theatrical roots to direct the show for 2 seasons.

He starred in the Broadway musical Lennon, which opened in August 2005 and closed after 49 performances. He then appeared in the world premiere of The Studio written and directed by his brother-in-law Christopher d'Amboise, at South Coast Repertory, Costa Mesa, California in March 2006.

Mann has made guest appearances on The Equalizer, Gargoyles (voice of Oberon), The Tick (voice), and Law & Order. He was also a leading character on The Dresden Files as Hrothbert "Bob" of Bainbridge, a cursed ghost. He portrayed oceanographer Bob Ballard in the 30 Rock episode "TGS Hates Women".

He appeared in the 2008 films A Circle on the Cross as James Monroe Good, Eavesdrop as August, and the 2009 film The Mandala Maker as Museum Chief Curator. Other films completed include a small role in Jazz in the Diamond District and as Lt. Fox in Red Hook.

In November 2009, he originated the role of Mal Beineke opposite Nathan Lane and Bebe Neuwirth in the Chicago tryout of a musical adaptation of The Addams Family. The show, along with Mann, transferred to Broadway, and opened in March 2010. He continued to play the role of Mal Beineke until April 2011, when he, along with several other members of the original cast, left the show.

Mann played King Charlemagne in the American Repertory Theatre (Boston) production of Pippin, from December 2012 to January 2013 a role he first played in the 2004 World AIDS Day Concert. He reprised that role in the Broadway revival for which he received a 2013 Tony nomination for Best Featured Actor in a Musical. He performed alongside his wife, Charlotte d'Amboise, who performed as Fastrada, the King's devious second wife.

In 2015, he took over the role of Charles Frohman/Captain James Hook in the Broadway musical Finding Neverland, replacing Anthony Warlow, who left the show on September 27. He was to remain in the role until Kelsey Grammer's return in January 2016. He appeared in the role of "Man in the Yellow Suit" in the Broadway musical Tuck Everlasting in 2016. And he gave a “commanding” performance starring as Edgar Degas in the West Coast premiere of Marie, Dancing Still at Seattle's 5th Avenue Theatre in 2019. In January 2025, he returned to Broadway replacing Eric Anderson as Meyer Wolfsheim in The Great Gatsby for a limited engagement through April of that same year.

== Personal life ==
He married his Pippin co-star Charlotte d'Amboise on January 20, 1996. The couple have two daughters, Josephine, and Shelby who is currently a member of the New York City Ballet corps de ballet.

== Filmography ==
Sources: TV Guide; TCM

=== Film ===
Year	Title	Role	Notes
1972	Spook!	Richard	
1985	A Chorus Line	Larry	
1986	Critters	Ug / Johnny Steele	
1986	Solarbabies	Ivor	
1988	Big Top Pee-wee	Snowball the Clown	
1988	Critters 2: The Main Course	Ug	
1988	Gandahar	The Collective Voice	Voice
1991	Critters 3	Ug	
1992	Critters 4	Ug / Counselor Tetra	
2007	Shortcut to Happiness	Art Dealer	
2008	A Circle on the Cross	James Monroe Good	
2008	Eavesdrop	August	
2009	The Mandala Maker	Museum Chief Curator	Short
2009	Red Hook	Lieutenant Fox	
2014	Freedom	Barney Fagan	

=== Television ===
Year	Title	Role	Notes
1982–1983	The Edge of Night	Announcer / Maximilian	5 episodes
1986–1987	As the World Turns	Jester	5 episodes
1987	The Equalizer	Shadow Man	Episode: "Inner View"
1988	The Equalizer	Graham	Episode: "Eighteen with a Bullet"
1989	Another World	Griffen Sanders	1 episode
1989	Stuck with Each Other	Unknown	TV movie
1990	Shangri-La Plaza	Ira Bonda	Pilot
1991	Bump in the Night	Ben Nicolaides	TV movie
1991	The 10 Million Dollar Getaway	Richard Eaton	TV movie
1992–1993	Loving	Leland Osgood	9 episodes
1995	Beauty and the Beast: The Broadway Musical Comes to L.A.	Beast	TV movie
1996	The Tick	Alien Interpreter (voice)	Episode: "The Tick vs. the Big Nothing"
1996	Gargoyles	Oberon (voice)	3 episodes
1996	Mrs. Santa Claus	Augustus P. Tavish	TV movie
1997	All My Children	Earl Boyd	Guest
1997	True Women	Captain Haller	Miniseries; uncredited
1997	Liberty! The American Revolution	General John Burgoyne	Miniseries
1999	One Life to Live	Daniel	2 episodes
2001–2005	Law & Order	Oyler / Dorn's Lawyer	2 episodes
2006	Guiding Light	Ted	2 episodes
2006	Love Monkey	Gordon Decker	Episode: "Mything Persons"
2007	The Dresden Files	Bob (Hrothbert of Bainbridge)	Regular
2011	30 Rock	Bob Ballard	Episode: "TGS Hates Women"
2011	Unforgettable	Stephen	Episode: "Friended"
2012	Smash	Randy Cobra	Episode: "Understudy"
2015–2018	Sense8	Milton Bailey "Whispers" Brandt	Regular
2017	Sleepy Hollow	The Devil	Episode: "Freedom"
2017	Time After Time	Mr. Knox	Episode: "I Fall Behind"
2018	Instinct	John Whitehead	Episode: "Tribal"
2019	Unbreakable Kimmy Schmidt	Himself	Episode: "Kimmy Is in a Love Square!"
2019	The Blacklist	Harris Van Ness	Episode: "Alter Ego (No. 131)"
2021–present	Foundation	Brother Dusk	Regular

== Stage appearances ==
Sources: Playbill; Internet Broadway Database; AboutTheArtists

Year	Title	Role	Location	Notes
1980–1982	Barnum	Chester Lyman; Humbert Morrissey; Sherwood Stratton (understudy); Phineas Taylor Barnum (understudy - replacement)	St. James Theatre	Broadway
1982–1985	Cats	Rum Tum Tugger	Winter Garden Theatre	Broadway
1986	Rags	Saul	Mark Hellinger Theatre	Broadway
1987	Les Misérables	Javert	The Broadway Theatre	Broadway
2003	Les Misérables	Javert	Imperial Theatre	Broadway (replacement)
2015	Les Misérables	Javert	Connecticut Repertory Theatre	Regional
1989	Camelot	King Arthur	Candlewood Playhouse	Regional
1989–1990	Jerome Robbins' Broadway	Various roles	Imperial Theatre	Broadway (replacement)
1990–1991	Assassins	Leon Czolgosz	Playwrights Horizons	Off-Broadway
1991	1776	John Dickinson	Williamstown Theatre Festival	Regional
1994–1995	Beauty and the Beast	Beast	Palace Theatre	Broadway
1995–1996	Beauty and the Beast	Beast	Shubert Theatre	Los Angeles
1995	A Christmas Carol	Ebeneezer Scrooge	The Theater at Madison Square Garden	New York
1996	Getting Away with Murder	Gregory Reed	Broadhurst Theatre	Broadway
1997–1998	The Scarlet Pimpernel	Chauvelin	Minskoff Theatre	Broadway
2001	Chess	Molokov	Helen Hayes Performing Arts Center	Concert
2001–2002	The Rocky Horror Show	Frank-N-Furter	Circle in the Square Theatre	Broadway (replacement)
2003	Floyd Collins	Lee Collins	Playwrights Horizons	Concert
2005	Lennon	Various roles	Broadhurst Theatre	Broadway
2009–2010	The Addams Family	Mal Beineke	Oriental Theatre	Out-of-town tryout
2010–2011	The Addams Family	Mal Beineke	Lunt-Fontanne Theatre	Broadway
2011	My Fair Lady	Professor Henry Higgins	Connecticut Repertory Theatre	Regional
2012	Man of La Mancha	Miguel de Cervantes/Don Quixote	Connecticut Repertory Theatre	Regional
2012	Pippin	Charles	American Repertory Theatre	Out-of-town tryout
2013–2014	Pippin	Charles	Music Box Theatre	Broadway
2015	Peter Pan	Captain James Hook / Mr. George Darling	Connecticut Repertory Theatre	Regional
2015	Finding Neverland	Charles Frohman / Captain James Hook	Lunt-Fontanne Theatre	Broadway (replacement)
2016	Tuck Everlasting	The Man in the Yellow Suit	Broadhurst Theatre	Broadway
2018	Jerry Springer - The Opera	Jerry Springer	Pershing Square Signature Center	Off-Broadway
2018	Sweeney Todd: The Demon Barber of Fleet Street	Sweeney Todd	Connecticut Repertory Theatre	Regional
2018	The Little Mermaid	King Triton	Touhill Performing Arts Center	Regional
2019	Marie, Dancing Still	Edgar Degas	5th Avenue Theatre	Regional
2022	Only Gold	King Belenus	MCC Theater	Off-Broadway
2024	Romeo and Juliet	Friar Laurence	American Repertory Theatre	Regional
2025	The Great Gatsby	Meyer Wolfsheim	The Broadway Theatre	Broadway (replacement)

== Awards and nominations ==
Year	Award	Category	Work	
1987	Tony Award	Best Actor in a Musical	Les Misérables	Nominated
1994	Tony Award	Best Actor in a Musical	Beauty and the Beast	Nominated
1994	Drama Desk Award	Outstanding Actor in a Musical	Beauty and the Beast	Nominated
1994	Outer Critics Circle Award	Outstanding Actor in a Musical	Beauty and the Beast	Nominated
2013	Tony Award	Best Featured Actor in a Musical	Pippin	Nominated
2013	Outer Critics Circle Award	Outstanding Featured Actor in a Musical	Pippin	Won
2016	Outer Critics Circle Award	Outstanding Featured Actor in a Musical	Tuck Everlasting	Nominated
2018	Lucille Lortel Award	Outstanding Actor in a Musical	Jerry Springer - The Opera	Nominated
