= John Lavachielli =

American actor

John Lavachielli is an American actor. Born in Yonkers, New York, he began his career in 1983 as Mark Santoro in The Lords of Discipline, Paramount's adaptation of the Pat Conroy novel of the same name. He appeared in the 1990 film Men At Work, as well as the action adventure, The Rocketeer. His television guest star appearances include N.Y.P.D. Blue, M*A*S*H, Murder She Wrote, The Practice and 21 Jump Street. He made his directorial debut with the independent film, Wednesday Again.
