= Geeks (film) =

- Directed by: Matthew Group
- Produced by: Matthew Group; Mitchell Group
- Starring: Irvin Kershner; Colleen O'Shaughnessey; Ken Page; Ethan Phillips; David Prowse; John Ratzenberger; Tim Russ; Chris Sarandon; Glenn Shadix; David Ogden Stiers
- Cinematography: Carlos Godinez
- Edited by: Larry Sherwood
- Release date: 2004
- Country: United States
- Language: English

Geeks is a 2004 American documentary film that examines why people acquire an interest in "geeky" subjects such as Japanese anime, Star Wars, Star Trek, and the film The Nightmare Before Christmas.
