= Men at Work (1990 film) =

1990 film by Emilio Estevez

- Theatrical release poster
- Directed by: Emilio Estevez
- Written by: Emilio Estevez
- Produced by: Cassian Elwes
- Starring: Charlie Sheen; Emilio Estevez; Leslie Hope; Keith David; Darrell Larson; Dean Cameron; John Getz
- Cinematography: Tim Suhrstedt
- Edited by: Craig Bassett
- Music by: Stewart Copeland
- Production company: Epic Productions
- Distributed by: Triumph Releasing Corporation
- Release date: August 24, 1990
- Running time: 99 minutes
- Country: United States
- Language: English
- Budget: $9 million
- Box office: $16.2 million

Men at Work is a 1990 American black comedy film written and directed by Emilio Estevez, who also stars alongside his brother Charlie Sheen. The film co-stars Leslie Hope and Keith David and was released in the United States on August 24, 1990.

== Plot ==
Garbage collectors Carl Taylor and James St. James are infamous mischief makers in their local community, using the garbage as play things and disturbing the peace. Local bike cop Mike harasses them frequently, but they are used to his antics and ignore him. However, they are placed on probation for their unprofessional attitude and are assigned an observer: their supervisor's brother-in-law, Louis Fedders.

After work, the pair spy on Susan Wilkins, a woman living across the street, and watch as she is fighting with a man. She leaves the room and Carl, as a form of payback, shoots the man with a pellet gun. As James and Carl hide and laugh, two men enter Susan's apartment, garrote the man and drag him away. After stuffing his body into a barrel, they put the barrel in their car, but it falls out and is found the next day by Carl, James and Louis on their garbage route. Carl and James panic when they realize that not only is the dead man the same person Carl shot in Susan's apartment, but that he is also Jack Berger, a city councilman running for mayor. Louis, a Vietnam War vet suffering from post-traumatic stress disorder, calms the two down by noting that Jack died of strangulation.

Louis, demanding that the cops not get involved, takes control of the situation by having them stash the body at Carl's place. When Carl sees Susan come home, he decides to meet her and goes over to her apartment building. The meeting goes well and they decide to go for a night drive. Meanwhile, Louis kidnaps a pizza delivery man who sees James with the body. James tries to call the police, but Louis unplugs the phone and drags James, the pizza guy, and the body into a car to follow Carl and Susan.

While in pursuit of Carl and Susan, they are pulled over by Mike and his partner Jeff. Louis, using the BB gun and the pizza guy as a hostage, forces Mike and Jeff to drop their guns before handcuffing them together at a playground. Meanwhile, Carl and Susan are discovered and kidnapped by Biff and Mario, the hitmen who had killed Jack. The two get into an argument and Mario uses the tazer on Biff, who gets electrocuted. Carl and Susan escape them. They talk about Jack's mix up with the cassette tape about the waste dumpings. Susan smacks Carl for lying to her about his job. They next see Mike and Jeff handcuffed to each other. Maxwell Potterdam III, a corrupt businessman who has been dumping toxic waste illegally captures Carl and Susan. Jack had been covering for him but, when he tried to back out, Maxwell had him killed. Carl and Susan are then stuffed into cans and set to be drowned in a lake at a landfill Potterdam is using as an illegal dump site. Carl's barrel falls off the truck and he is freed; he and James manage to grab onto the truck carrying Susan while Louis, the pizza guy, and Jack's corpse follow in a rent-a-cop car.

Carl rescues Susan and the group defeat Potterdam's squad of goons, terrorize him with their pranks and then dispose of him in the toxic water.

== Cast ==
- Charlie Sheen as Carl Taylor
- Emilio Estevez as James St. James
- Leslie Hope as Susan Wilkins
- Keith David as Louis Fedders
- Dean Cameron as pizza man
- John Getz as Maxwell Potterdam III
- Hawk Wolinski as Biff
- John Lavachielli as Mario
- Geoffrey Blake as Frost
- Cameron Dye as Luzinski
- John Putch as officer Mike
- Tommy Hinkley as officer Jeff
- Darrell Larson as politician Jack Berger
- Sy Richardson as Walt Richardson
- Kari Whitman as Judy
- Troy Evans as Captain Leo Dalton
- Jim "Poorman" Trenton as the narrator

== Production ==
=== Development ===
The original screenplay was tentatively titled Clear Intent and was written in the mid-1980s. Estevez came up with the idea while he was filming the 1985 movie St. Elmo's Fire. Said Estevez, "I was living in a studio apartment in Santa Monica at the time, and I was up late one night sitting at the kitchen table working out some story ideas on my computer. All of a sudden, this trash truck came roaring down the alley under my window. It was 5 a.m. and it just struck me -- no one had ever done a movie about trashmen before."

It was slated to star another Brat Packer alongside Estevez, such as Judd Nelson.

At one stage, John Hughes was going to be producer or director, according to Estevez. "When I was reading it, I thought it was so good, so close to my bone, that I had written it", said Hughes. "Emilio wants to direct it, and I'm sure he will be able to. He can do anything. He can act, he can write, he can direct. He's surpassed me in that respect. I can't act--I wish I could.

Estevez wound up writing 15 different drafts of the film. He said he had no intention of having his brother Charlie star in the movie, but Sheen said he wanted a part after reading the script. "He felt he needed a comedy at this point of his career", Estevez said.

Epic Pictures provided the $9 million budget for the film.

The film's title was changed to Pop 65 then to Men at Work.

=== Filming ===
Most of the movie was shot in Redondo Beach and Hermosa Beach in California.

Charlie Sheen said his brother "was great.. . . He knew me too well. He'd say, 'Dude, let's get real here.' I respect the hell out of Emilio. He's very tai chi when it comes to directing."

Estevez says he wanted his brother to "sort of push the envelope and play the humor. He has a wonderful sense of humor, which hasn't really been put on film yet – up to now. Charlie has a very dry sense of humor, very cynical. And out of that comes some great, great humor."

Filming began in March 1989. The studio disliked the original ending; shooting the new one resulted in ten additional days of filming. Estevez edited the film while making Young Guns II during the day.

Estevez later said "For me to be able to do a movie where saving the environment is the underlying theme is the greatest contribution I can make, I think. More people are going to see what I'm doing in a film and be educated through entertainment than if I show up at a rally. I'm working on putting the causes I think we need to address into my work and into the projects I choose."

== Reception ==
Men at Work grossed US$16,247,964, with $3,184,311 of that within the first week.

The critical reception for the film was negative. Men at Work currently holds a 30% rating on Rotten Tomatoes based on 27 reviews.

== Soundtrack ==
The soundtrack for Men at Work was released by Rhino/Wea on July 18, 1990.

1. "Wear You to the Ball" – UB40
2. "Super Cool" – Sly & Robbie
3. "Big Pink House" – Tyrants in Therapy
4. "Feeling Good" – Pressure Drop
5. "Back to Back" – Blood Brothers
6. "Take Heed" – Black Uhuru
7. "Here and Beyond" – Sly & Robbie
8. "Truthful" – Blood Brothers
9. "Reggae Ambassador" – Third World
10. "Give a Little Love" – Ziggy Marley & the Melody Makers
11. "Playas Dawn" – Stewart Copeland
12. "Pink Panther No. 23" – Stewart Copeland
