= Ethan Phillips =

American actor (born 1955)

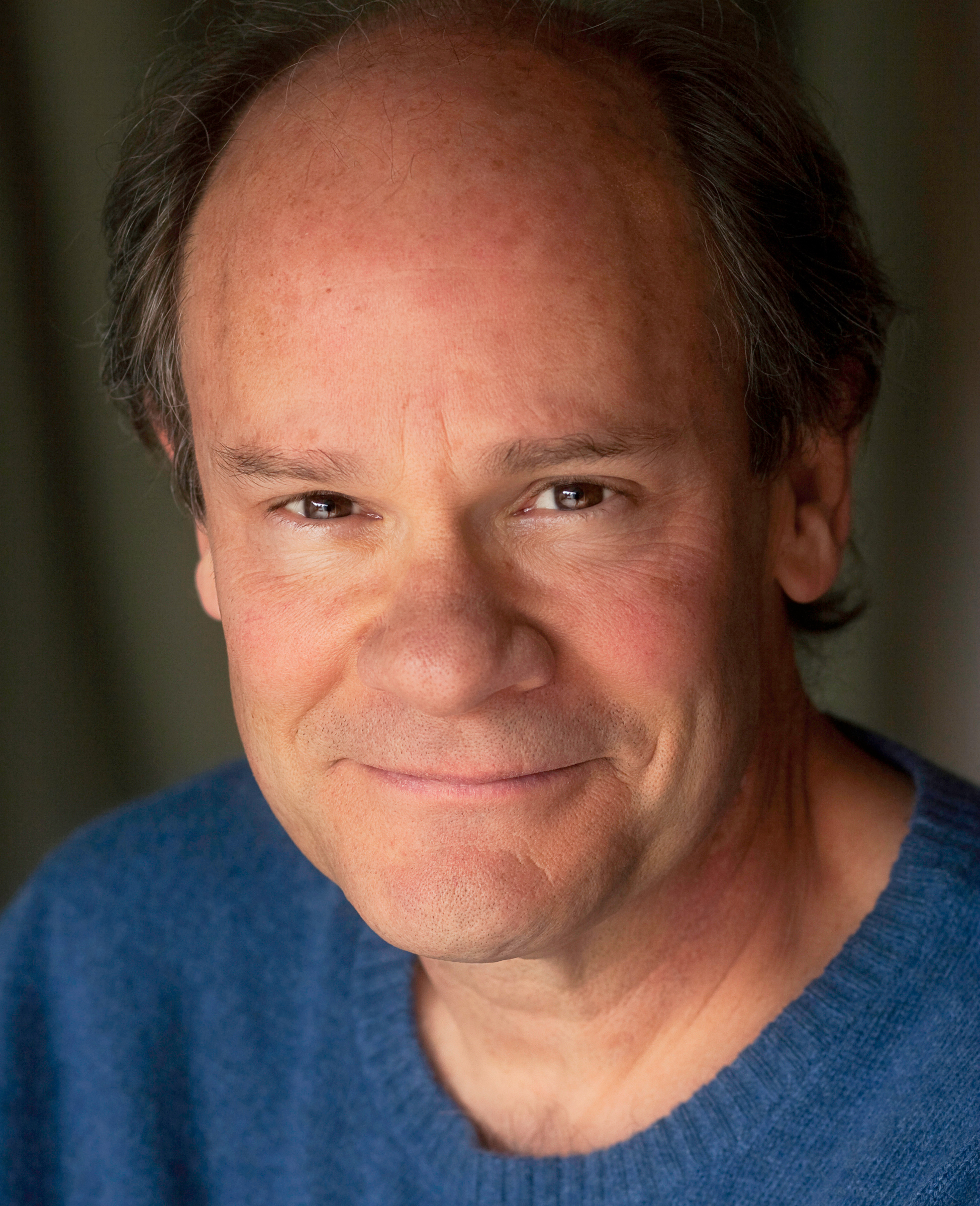
- Phillips in 2009
- Born: John Ethan Phillips; February 8, 1955 (age 71); Garden City, New York, U.S.
- Other name: Johnnie Phillips
- Education: Boston University (BA); Cornell University (MFA)
- Occupation: Actor
- Years active: 1977–present
- Spouse: Patricia E. Cresswell (m. 1990; died 2022)
- Children: 3

John Ethan Phillips (born February 8, 1955) is an American actor. He is best known for his television roles as Neelix on Star Trek: Voyager (1995–2001) and PR man Pete Downey on Benson (1979–1986). His film roles include Critters (1986) and its sequel Critters 3 (1991), as well as The Island (2005), Inside Llewyn Davis (2013), and Irrational Man (2015).

== Personal life ==
Phillips was raised on Long Island, New York. His father was the owner of Frankie & Johnnie's, a steakhouse on 45th and Eighth Avenue in New York City. He earned a Bachelor's degree in English literature from Boston University and a Master of Fine Arts from Cornell University. He plays the tenor saxophone.

== Career ==
=== Theatre ===
Phillips began his show business career in New York City, performing off-Broadway at theaters including Direct Theater, winning the Best of the Actors' Festival there in 1977; at the Wonderhorse Theater, in the premiere of Christopher Durang's The Nature and Purpose of the Universe; and at Playwrights Horizons in a revival of Eccentricities of a Nightingale. Tennessee Williams, who helped shape the latter production, wrote a new monologue for Phillips, which Williams personally dictated to him when it was realized that leading lady Jill Eikenberry needed more time for a dress change.

In 1979–80, Phillips appeared as Maurice Utrillo in the premier of Dennis McIntyre's Modigliani, with Jeffrey DeMunn, at the Astor Place Theater. It ran for 208 performances.

Phillips performed in many plays in New York over the next 15 years, including Terrence McNally's Lips Together, Teeth Apart at the Lucille Lortel, Measure for Measure with Kevin Kline at The Public Theater's Delacorte Theater; and the Broadway premier of My Favorite Year at Lincoln Center, with Andrea Martin and Tim Curry, as well as new works for Ars Nova (theater), Ensemble Studio Theatre, Playwrights Horizons, the Hudson Guild Theater, the American Jewish Theater, and many others.

He went on to appear in the premier of David Mamet's November with Nathan Lane and Laurie Metcalf at the Ethel Barrymore Theater and performed it once more with John Malkovich and Patti Lupone for Stars in the House. He played the title character opposite Peter Dinklage in The Imaginary Invalid for Bard College's 2012 SummerScape Festival. In 2013–14 he appeared as Stanley Levison in Robert Schenkkan's All the Way at the American Repertory Theater. Phillips moved with the show to Broadway's Neil Simon Theater where the play won the Tony Award for Best Play and Best Actor, Bryan Cranston. More recently Phillips played leading roles in the premiers of Dennis Kelly’s Taking Care of Baby, Terrence McNally's Golden Age, and Sharyn Rothstein's By the Water, all for the Manhattan Theatre Club (off-Broadway). Most recently, Phillips played Murray Lefkowitz in the Broadway premier of Ayad Akhtar's Junk: The Golden Age of Debt at Lincoln Center's Vivian Beaumont Theater.

Phillips' regional theater credits include leading roles for San Diego's Old Globe Theater, the Alaska Repertory Theater, at Seattle Repertory Theater, at Baltimore's Centerstage, for the Westport Country Playhouse, Boston Shakespeare Company, Actors Theater of Louisville, The American Repertory Theater, the Salt Lake Acting Co., and the McCarter Theatre. In Los Angeles, Phillips acted in Side Man at the Pasadena Playhouse, in Lips Together, Teeth Apart for the Mark Taper Forum; in You Can't Take It with You at the Geffen Playhouse, in The Bourgeois Gentleman for the Pasadena Symphony, and as Polonius in Hamlet for the Uprising Theater.

Phillips has been an actor at the Sundance Institute's Playwrights Conference in Utah for six summers, where he developed his play Penguin Blues, which is published by Samuel French Inc. and included in The Best Short Plays of 1989 (Applause, ed. Ramon Delgado). Based on his experiences at Sundance, Phillips helped found First Stage, a playwright development lab in Los Angeles.

=== Film ===
Phillips has appeared in over 50 films, beginning with Ragtime (directed by Miloš Forman). Other features include For Richer or Poorer, Jeffrey, The Shadow, Wagons East, The Man Without a Face, Green Card, Lean On Me, Critters, Bloodhounds of Broadway, The Island, Bad Santa, and The Babysitters. His more recent films include Shadow Witness, Audrey, the Coen Brothers' Inside Llewyn Davis, Woody Allen's Irrational Man, and James DeMonaco's The Purge: Election Year.

=== Television ===
In 1980, Phillips joined the cast of the sitcom Benson as PR man Pete Downey, for five seasons.

He has made scores of guest appearances on television series and tele films, including Pushing Daisies, Bones, Eli Stone, Criminal Minds, NUMB3RS, Las Vegas, L.A. Law, JAG, Law & Order, Arrested Development, Boston Legal, Touched by an Angel, Castle, Rizzoli & Isles, The Good Guys, The Mentalist, Deadbeat, The Good Wife, New Amsterdam (2018 TV series), Better Call Saul and Veep. He played the recurring role of Keith in the final two seasons of Lena Dunham's Girls. He played Spike Martin in Armando Iannucci's space comedy Avenue 5 on HBO.

In 1990, he began his Star Trek career playing the Ferengi doctor Farek in the Star Trek: The Next Generation episode "Ménage à Troi". He went on to play the Talaxian character Neelix on Star Trek: Voyager from its inception in 1995, and stayed with the series one episode short of its entire seven-season run. He also cameoed as a holographic nightclub maître d' in the 1996 film Star Trek: First Contact, and appeared as a Ferengi pirate captain in the Star Trek: Enterprise episode "Acquisition".

Phillips has also performed voice work for several of the Star Wars franchise video games: 2000's Star Wars: Force Commander, 2001's Star Wars: Galactic Battlegrounds, and 2003's Star Wars: Knights of the Old Republic.

== Filmography ==
=== Film ===
Year	Title	Role	Notes
1981	Ragtime	Guard At Family House	
1986	Critters	Jeff Barnes	
1987	Burglar	Bartender At Parker's On Fifth	
1989	Lean on Me	Mr. Rosenberg	
1989	Glory	Hospital Steward	
1989	Bloodhounds of Broadway	Basil Valentine	
1990	Green Card	INS Agent Gorsky	
1991	Critters 3	Deputy	
1993	Rain Without Thunder	The Gynecologist	
1993	The Man Without a Face	Todd Lansing	
1994	The Shadow	Nelson	
1994	Wagons East	Commander S. L. Smedly	
1995	Jeffrey	Dave	
1996	Star Trek: First Contact	Holodeck Nightclub Maitre d'	Uncredited
1997	Trekkies	Himself	
1997	For Richer or Poorer	Jerry	
1998	The Battery	Bernard	Short film
2000	Endsville	Terry Festinger	
2000	9mm of Love	Guy	
2003	Rugrats Go Wild	Toa the loris	Voice
2003	Bad Santa	Roger Merman	
2004	Trekkies 2	Himself	Documentary
2004	Geeks	Himself	Documentary
2004	Chestnut: Hero of Central Park	Marty	
2005	The Island	Jones Three Echo	
2007	Keith	Mr. Miles	
2007	Have Dreams, Will Travel (aka A West Texas Children's Story)	Businessman	
2007	The Babysitters	Mark Kessler	
2007	California Dreaming	Wayne Porter	
2010	Dahmer vs. Gacy	X-13	
2012	Arachnoquake	Roy	
2012	The Adventures of RoboRex	Randy Jenkins	
2013	Inside Llewyn Davis	Mitch Gorfein	
2014	Audrey	Donny	
2015	Irrational Man	Jill's Father	
2016	The Purge: Election Year	Chief Couper	
2016	Miles	Mr. Wilson	
2017	Future '38	Dr. Elcourt	
2018	Most Likely to Murder	Bobby Green	
2025	The Home	Ethan	

=== Television ===
Year	Title	Role	Notes
1980–1985	Benson	Peter "Pete" John Downey	Seasons 2-6
1983	One Life to Live	Mr. Darrin	2 episodes
1983	Hart to Hart	Redstone	Episode: "Pandora Has Wings"
1985	Three's a Crowd	Ronnie Pine	Episode: "Jack Gets Trashed"
1985	The Twilight Zone	Deaver	Segment: "Devil's Alphabet"
1986	Hunter	State Department Man	Episode: "High Noon in L.A."
1987	Outlaws	Vernon Buckley	Episode: "Jackpot"
1987	Werewolf	Eddy Armando	
1990	Star Trek: The Next Generation	Dr. Farek	Episode: "Ménage à Troi"
1990	Doogie Howser, M.D.	Advertiser	Episode: "Ask Dr. Doogie"
1990–1993	L.A. Law	Dr. Sam Waibel / Marvin Pick	2 episodes
1991	Father Dowling Mysteries	Leonard Spalding	Episode: "The Monkey Business Mystery"
1991	Murphy Brown	Richard Cooper	Episode: "Everytime It Rains... You Get Wet"
1992	Law & Order	Mark Hauser	Episode: "Helpless"
1993	NYPD Blue	Dwight	Episode: "True Confessions"
1994	The Mommies	Omelette Chef	Episode: "Mommies Day"
1995	Platypus Man	Vern Tuttle	Episode: "Pilot"
1995–2001	Star Trek: Voyager	Neelix	Main cast, 170 episodes
1995	Maybe This Time	Douglas	Episode: "Judgment Day"
1996	Chicago Hope	Bob Stewart	Episode: "Sexual Perversity in Chicago Hope"
1996	Homeboys in Outer Space	Inspector 17	Episode: "House Party or, Play That Funky White Music Droid"
1998	From the Earth to the Moon	Stanley Craig	TV miniseries Episode: "We Interrupt This Program"
1998	The Lost World	Copy Boy	TV movie
2002	Rugrats	Storyteller (voice)	Episode: "Quiet, Please"/"Early Retirement"
2002	Star Trek: Enterprise	Ulis, Group Leader of Ferengi Thieves	Episode: "Acquisition"
2002	Rocket Power	Shop Owner (voice)	Episode: "Less Than Full Otto"/"Card Sharked"
2002	Half & Half	Dr. Adelman	Episode: "The Big Award Episode"
2002	Providence	Finch	Episode: "Truth and Consequences"
2003	Touched by an Angel	Wally	Episode: "The Show Must Not Go On"
2003	Rock Me Baby	The Doctor	Episode: "Pretty in Pink Eye"
2004	8 Simple Rules	Dave	Episode: "YMCA"
2004	JAG	Mr. Worley	Episode: "Take It Like a Man"
2004	Arrested Development	Military Officer	Episode: "Whistler's Mother"
2004	Oliver Beene	Mr. Stitt	2 episodes
2005	Las Vegas	Gabe Labrador	Episode: "Double Down, Triple Threat"
2006	Numb3rs	Leonard Philbrick	Episode: "Double Down"
2006	Criminal Minds	Marvin Doyle	Episode: "A Real Rain"
2006	Boston Legal	Michael Schiller	3 episodes
2006	The War at Home	Bob Cooper	Episode: "Be Careful What You Ask For"
2007	Cavemen	"Red" Goldreyer	
2007	Super Sweet 16: The Movie	Craig	TV movie
2007	Hallowed Ground	The Preacher	TV movie
2007	Star Trek: Of Gods and Men	Data Clerk	Miniseries
2008	Eli Stone	Principal Ackerman	Episode: "I Want Your Sex"
2008	Bones	Checker Box Manager	Episode: "The Wannabe in the Weeds"
2008	Pushing Daisies	Daniel Hill	Episode: "Robbing Hood"
2009	Mental	Hollis Breyer	Episode: "Book of Judges"
2009	True Blood	Parish Coroner	Episode: "Shake and Fingerpop"; Uncredited
2010	Rizzoli & Isles	John J. Murray	Episode: "I Kissed a Girl"
2010	The Good Guys	Alphonse LaViolette	Episode: "Common Enemies"
2010	The Middle	The Chairman	Episode: "The Quarry"
2010	Days of Our Lives	Mr. Satterfield	Episode #1.11456
2011	Castle	James Farnham	Episode: "The Final Nail"
2011	The Mentalist	Newsome Kirk	Episode: "The Red Mile"
2011	The Young and the Restless	Nelson McGinnis	Episode: "Tucker Is Taken Off Life Support"
2011	Chuck	Woodley	Episode: "Chuck Versus the Zoom"
2012	Arachnoquake	Roy	TV movie
2014	Deadbeat	Jack Donaldson	Episode: "Calamityville Horror"
2015	Veep	Mr. Wallace	2 episodes
2016	The Good Wife	Dr. Morris Weiner	Episode: "Tracks"
2016	All the Way	Joe Alsop	TV movie Uncredited
2016–2017	Girls	Keith	5 episodes
2016	Younger	Paul	Episode: "Summer Friday"
2018	Dallas & Robo	Bob (voice)	Episode: "I Was a Teenage Cannibal Biker"
2018	Better Call Saul	Judge Benedict Munsinger	2 episodes: "Talk" and "Coushatta"
2018	New Amsterdam	Dan Marken	Episode: "Anthropocene"
2020	Avenue 5	Spike Martin	Main cast

=== Stage ===
Year	Title	Role	Theatre
1992	My Favorite Year	Herb Lee	Vivian Beaumont Theater
2008	November	Turkey Rep	Ethel Barrymore Theatre
2014	All the Way	Stanley Levison	Neil Simon Theatre
2017	Junk: The Golden Age of Debt	Murray Lefkowitz	Vivian Beaumont Theater

=== Web series ===
Year	Title	Role	Notes
2023	Star Trek: Very Short Treks	Neelix (voice)	Episode: "Holograms All the Way Down"

=== Video games ===
Year	Title	Role	Notes
2000	Star Trek: Voyager – Elite Force	Neelix	Voice
2000	Star Wars: Force Commander	Transport Pilot, Governor of Abridon	Voice
2001	Star Wars: Galactic Battlegrounds	Empire Medical Droid, Krantian Governor, Royal Grenade Trooper	Voice
2003	Star Wars: Knights of the Old Republic	Galon Lor (Korriban), Tamlen, Hrakert Mercenary, Dantooine Civilian, Various	Voice
2004	Syphon Filter: The Omega Strain	Broussard, Canadian Prime Minister	Voice
2014	Star Trek Online	Neelix	Voice

== Publications ==
- Philips, Ethan; Birnes, William J. (1999). The Star Trek Cookbook. New York: Pocket Books. ISBN 0-671-00022-5.
