= Alien Xmas =

2020 American stop-motion animated film

- Promotional release poster
- Based on: Alien Xmas by Stephen Chiodo and Jim Strain
- Written by: Kealan O'Rourke; Dan Clark; Noah Kloor
- Directed by: Stephen Chiodo
- Starring: Keythe Farley; Dee Bradley Baker; Kaliayh Rhambo; Michelle Deco; Barbara Goodson
- Music by: Bleeding Fingers Music; Adam Schiff
- Country of origin: United States
- Original language: English

Production
- Executive producers: Jon Favreau; David Ellender; Sander Schwartz; Karen Gilchrist; Charles Chiodo; Stephen Chiodo; Edward Chiodo; Jim Strain
- Producers: Edward Chiodo; John Bartnicki
- Cinematography: Helder Sun; Aaron Wise
- Editor: Michael Mayhew
- Running time: 40 minutes
- Production companies: Netflix Animation Studios; Fairview Entertainment; Sonar Entertainment; Chiodo Brothers Productions

Original release
- Network: Netflix
- Release: November 20, 2020

Alien Xmas is a 2020 American stop-motion animated Christmas science fiction fantasy adventure comedy television special directed by Stephen Chiodo (one of the three members of The Chiodo Brothers). Based on the 2006 book of the same name by Chiodo and Jim Strain, the special features the voices of Keythe Farley, Dee Bradley Baker, Kaliayh Rhambo, Michelle Deco and Barbara Goodson. The plot for Alien Xmas centers on X, an extraterrestrial belonging to a race of thieving aliens known as Klepts, who is sent to the North Pole on a mission to eliminate Earth's gravity. Alien Xmas was executive produced by Jon Favreau and was released on Netflix on November 20, 2020.

== Plot ==
Long ago, a race of colorful extraterrestrials known as Klepts (Note: As in kleptomania, derived from the Greek word κλέπτω (klepto) "to steal".) became greedy and plundered their home planet of its resources. Their color faded away, and they set off into outer space, moving from galaxy to galaxy and stealing whatever they could. The leader of the Klepts, known as Supreme Leader Z, decides to steal all of the "stuff" on the planet Earth. Her plan involves building a device dubbed "the Gyrotron," which will eliminate Earth's gravity on the North Magnetic Pole; objects on the planet will be sent into orbit, where the Klepts' spaceships can collect them. Z sends X, a small Klept, to carry out the mission with a helper robot known as a Semi-Automatic Multi-Tasking Unit (or SAMTU).

X and SAMTU arrive on Earth shortly before Christmas Eve. They land in Christmas Town, where Santa Claus and his elves live. That night, Santa unveils a technologically advanced sleigh meant to help him deliver Christmas presents all around the world more quickly. However, the sleigh malfunctions, and Santa instructs Obie, his lead elf mechanic, to fix it. Obie's time spent working on the sleigh has kept him from spending time with his daughter Holly and her mother Noelle, much to Holly's disappointment.

In an ice cave, X directs SAMTU to build the Gyrotron. Driven by an urge to steal, X ventures into Christmas Town, where he encounters Obie. X plays dead, leading Obie to believe him to be an inanimate doll. Obie gives X to Holly as a gift. The next day, Holly keeps X with her as she decorates with her mother, goes caroling, and attends a Christmas dinner, causing X to witness the elves' kindness and generosity towards one another. At night, X tries to escape Holly's home with a bag of stolen items, but Holly sees him attempting to do so. She gives X a puppy as a companion; the act of being given something fills X with feelings of compassion and warmth and causes him to regain his blue color.

X decides not to follow through with Supreme Leader Z's plan and instead reprograms SAMTU to fix Santa's sleigh. However, Z orders the other Klepts to invade Christmas Town. The Klepts activate the Gyrotron, but SAMTU manages to destroy the machine, electrocuting itself in the process. Nonetheless, the Klepts triumph over the residents of Christmas Town. Z, believing that X gained the Earthlings' trust in order to lead the Klepts to their "stuff," promotes him to Vice Supreme Leader. Feeling distraught, X hands the puppy to Z as a gift, causing her to regain her pink color. The residents of Christmas Town give presents to the other Klepts, restoring them to their colorful selves.

At the break of dawn on Christmas morning, Santa laments that there is not enough time left to deliver Christmas gifts to all the children of the world. X takes to the sky with a number of other Klepts in spaceships, traveling around the planet and delivering the presents as Santa wished.

== Cast ==
- Keythe Farley as Santa Claus
- Dee Bradley Baker as X
- Kaliayh Rhambo as Holly
- Michelle Deco as Noelle
- Barbara Goodson as Z
- Jessica Gee-George as Mrs. Claus / Reindeer / Klepts / Audience
- Kaitlyn Robrock as Elf Kid #3 / Reindeer / Klepts / Audience
- Jon Favreau as Obie (uncredited)

== Production ==
Alien Xmas is based on the 2006 book of the same name by director Stephen Chiodo and Jim Strain. The Chiodo Brothers initially pitched an animated adaptation of the book to executive producer Jon Favreau, whom they had previously worked with on the 2003 live-action film Elf, for which the Chiodos created a sequence featuring stop-motion animated characters. Though Alien Xmas utilized computer-generated imagery in scenes featuring spaceships, the majority of the special was produced using stop-motion animation. Stephen Chiodo stated that "we animated mostly on twos while maintaining the hand-made quality of Rankin & Bass, but we gave it a 21st century value. It was achieved through a lack of detail. But we had to find that balance where we gave it enough detail in the art direction to make it look good by today's standards." Bleeding Fingers Music and Adam Schiff composed the music for Alien Xmas.

== Reception ==
On Rotten Tomatoes, Alien Xmas has an approval rating of 100% based on seven reviews, with an average rating of 7.5/10. Polygon's Tasha Robinson compared Alien Xmas to How the Grinch Stole Christmas!, Invader Zim and the stop-motion works of Rankin/Bass and called the special "a harmless holiday distraction, short and cute and speedbump-free. But it's lacking any real verve or signature of its own." Cheryl Eddy of io9 wrote that "Alien Xmas' message about consumerism may be simple, but that doesn’t make it any less valuable" and noted that "There are clever moments throughout that keep the movie from feeling too saccharine." John Squires of Bloody Disgusting concluded: "Imaginative and heartfelt, Alien Xmas is far from the first Christmas special to highlight the importance of holiday togetherness versus a consumeristic obsession with stuff, but it's a timeless message the Chiodos deliver with the genuine earnestness of filmmakers who are bringing a passion project to life rather than churning out a lifeless product."
