= Mike's Murder =

1984 film by James Bridges

- Theatrical release poster
- Directed by: James Bridges
- Written by: James Bridges
- Produced by: James Bridges
- Starring: Debra Winger; Mark Keyloun; Darrell Larson; Paul Winfield
- Cinematography: Reynaldo Villalobos
- Edited by: Dede Allen; Jeff Gourson
- Music by: John Barry
- Production company: The Ladd Company
- Distributed by: Warner Bros.
- Release date: March 9, 1984
- Running time: 109 minutes
- Country: United States
- Language: English
- Budget: $6.3 million
- Box office: $1 million

Mike's Murder is a 1984 American neo-noir mystery film released by Warner Bros. starring Debra Winger. It was written, produced and directed by James Bridges. Mark Keyloun, Paul Winfield, and Darrell Larson appear in support.

== Plot ==
In West Los Angeles, bank teller Betty Parrish has a one-night stand with a young tennis instructor, Mike Chuhutsky, with promises of a followup that never happens.

Mike can't make enough with his racquet to afford living in the tony Brentwood neighborhood he has moved into, and turns to dealing drugs on the side. A year or so later he sees Betty on Sunset Boulevard and flags her down for a ride. He explains he is being chased for encroaching on another dealer's territory, and that his life is in peril; she drops him off at the top of a long drive into an expensive home high up Doheny Drive above the Hollywood Hills.

Their friendship resumed, a "telephone" relationship evolves in fits and stops - mainly stops - of Mike calling and making dates then never following through. Either he calls and puts one off once or more the same evening or just never shows. Still, Betty, who is only dabbling at a relationship with an arty geek, puts up with it, and earnestly looks forward to each never-materializing rendezvous.

Along the way Mike swears to Betty that after successfully eluding repercussions for his reckless dealing - somebody squared things for him while weathering them out up on Doheny - he's quit, for good. Meanwhile, he is constantly in debt; it's never clear where the obligations come from and why he can't ever seem to pay them off.

One night, as their dalliance is running towards an unconsummated two years (since the one-night stand), Mike makes a date with Betty he swears he will keep. Before he can, Pete, his former drug dealing partner and still pal, pitches him "easy money", $3,000 for something routine he's done on his own before. Only this time, for no explained or obvious reason, he needs a partner. Mike agrees, and Betty is left hanging.

The job is simple enough - mule a suitcase from a locker at Union Station in downtown L.A. to the home of a pair of big-time drug dealers, who immediately begin an assay of the 20 or more kilos of cocaine it contains. After slitting an already weighed kilo bag open they are distracted by a security alarm. Eying the enormous cache, Pete gets wordless assent from Mike, then fills a gallon baggy with a couple of inches worth; the pair flees before their hosts can return.

When Pete drops Mike off at his apartment two goons seize him, and Pete tears away. He is then dogged everywhere, making numerous narrow escapes. As the day wears on Pete begins to become ragged, vastly compounded by relentlessly dipping into the coke.

Eventually, a friend of Mike's calls Betty and tells her that Mike is dead.

Unable to shake her curiosity, Betty goes to the mansion on Doheny. There she learns that Mike was originally picked up as a hitchhiker by its owner, a wealthy middle-aged rock music producer, Philip Green, traveling cross-country, and had earned a first class ticket to LA following a fling. After settling into a relationship with Phillip at his enclave (populated by similar hangers-on) Mike had decided to get his own place in Brentwood, trying to get by teaching tennis, then dealing drugs when he couldn't. And indeed had never quit, borrowing money to front purchases from a doting Phillip (who attests to a genuine and abiding love for Mike, maintains he never knew what the loans were for, or asked), then struggling to pay him back.

Dazed, Betty, goes to another friend of Mike's, learns of years more of a similarly parasitic life with an older photographer, then to Mike's apartment, where she encounters a scene of utter horror: every wall blood-spattered, the carpet saturated, furniture and bric-a-brac broken and scattered everywhere, policemen calmly dusting for fingerprints. Horrified, she reels as far into evening as she can stand with a supportive friend, Patty, before overloading.

Dropped off at home, Betty is shoved in its front door by a crazed Pete, who one moment seeks her help, then threatens violence, even death, the next. He chatters that Mike's butchering was an "enforcement killing", a warning to others from the dealers who'd been punked. After a struggle in the kitchen over a long knife Betty barricades herself in a room. As Pete attempts to break its door in, other voices are heard; there is a struggle, then silence.

Pete's body is dumped by two thugs into a rubble siite.

Following two weeks of staying with Patty, Betty returns home, fending off phone entreaties from both of her parents to variously move in with them or buy a gun. She explains she never saw Pete's murderers, could not recognize their voices, and that they were only after him, not both of them. She feels safe. Shaken - but safe. And will simply seek to put it all behind her and get on with her life.

== Cast ==
- Debra Winger as Betty Parrish
- Mark Keyloun as Mike Chuhutsky
- Darrell Larson as Pete
- Brooke Alderson as Patty
- Paul Winfield as Philip Green
- Robert Crosson as Sam Morris
- Daniel Shor as Richard
- William Ostrander as Randy
- Kym Malin as Beautiful Girl #1

== Production ==
James Bridges wrote the film specifically for Debra Winger, having worked with her on Urban Cowboy. Filming began with production by The Ladd Company in May 1982 and was announced as completed the following August. After disastrous preview screenings in January 1983, distributor Warner Bros. Pictures demanded a re-structure the original version, which had been a reverse-chronology from Betty's subjective point of view, to a traditionally told chronological story. Flashbacks and Betty's fantasy sequences were removed, and only the aftermath of the killing was shown. Bridges shot additional scenes (expanding the role of “Pete”), the original score was completely dropped in favor of a new one by John Barry.

== Release ==
The film had a very brief theatrical run during March 1984 in New York City and Los Angeles. In late September 1984, Warner Bros. tried a different distribution pattern and released the film on one or two screens, particularly in college towns. Among the cities included in the re-opening were New Haven, Connecticut, Columbus, Ohio, Seattle, Washington, and Minneapolis, Minnesota. It had a one-week run in San Francisco, California, that November.

=== Box office ===
The production budget of Mike's Murder was $6.3 million, which does not include negative duplication, distribution, and promotional expenses. Gross was $1 million.

=== Critical reviews ===
Winger's performance in Mike's Murder led the critic Pauline Kael to describe the actress as "a major reason to go on seeing movies in the 1980s".

Mike's Murder holds an 80% rating on Rotten Tomatoes based on five reviews.

=== Home video ===
Warner Home Video issued Mike's Murder on VHS in 1985 and 1991. Warner Bros. Digital Distribution released it on 4 August 2009, as part of the Warner Archive Collection series.
