= City Limits (1985 film) =

- Theatrical release poster
- Directed by: Aaron Lipstadt
- Written by: Don Opper
- Story by: Aaron Lipstadt; James Reigle
- Produced by: Rupert Harvey; Barry Opper
- Starring: Darrell Larson; John Stockwell; Kim Cattrall; Rae Dawn Chong; John Diehl; Pamela Ludwig; Tony Plana; Dean Devlin; James Earl Jones
- Cinematography: Tim Suhrstedt
- Edited by: R. J. Kizer
- Music by: Mitchell Froom
- Distributed by: Atlantic Releasing
- Release dates: October 1984 (Chicago International Film Festival); September 1, 1985 (United States)
- Running time: 86 minutes
- Country: United States
- Language: English
- Budget: $2.5-3.4 million

City Limits is a 1984 post-apocalyptic action film written and directed by Aaron Lipstadt, and is based on a story by Lipstadt and James Reigle. The film stars Darrell Larson, John Stockwell, Kim Cattrall, Rae Dawn Chong, John Diehl, Pamela Ludwig, Tony Plana, Robby Benson, Dean Devlin, and James Earl Jones.

== Plot ==
In the near future a mysterious plague kills almost every adult and leaves behind "a world of orphans". Some fortunate few are raised by the surviving adults, including Lee (John Stockwell), who is taken in and raised by Albert (James Earl Jones) on his remote farm. Fifteen years later, Lee sets out for the nearby ruins of Los Angeles in the hopes of joining the Clippers, a famous motorcycle gang. Lee follows a convoy of trucks into a fenced off building, where he is noticed by Bolo (Norbert Weisser), who is overseeing operations. When workers begin to converge on Lee he flees on his motorcycle.

After defending himself against and fleeing from a hostile group of bikers known as the DAs, Lee makes his way into Clippers territory and meets their leader Mick (Darrell Larson) and his second in command Whitey (John Diehl). When Lee asks to join the gang, he is rebuffed. Mick sends Yogi (Rae Dawn Chong) along to escort Lee safely to the city limits. The two are chased by the DAs when they discover one of the bikers who attacked Lee earlier has died from his injuries. Lee and Yogi manage to evade the DAs and head back to Clippers territory. Whitey and Mick debate turning him over to Ray (Danny De La Paz), the leader of the DAs, to preserve the "no guns, no killing" truce that exists between the two gangs, but Sammy (Don Keith Opper) offers a suggestion. When Ray arrives, Whitey proposes a test of combat between Lee and the DAs' best combatant to decide if he lives; Ray agrees. After he leaves Ray heads to the factory where he reports to Bolo, who tells him he will be sending one of his employees with him to the competition.

The next day the two gangs arrive for the competition. Before the fight begins Ray presents Wickings (Kim Cattrall), who introduces herself and Bolo as representatives of the Sunya Corporation, brought to L.A. at the behest of the Federal government. Wickings attempts to convince Mick to have the Clippers help with Sunya's efforts to restore the city, but Mick turns her down. The gangs proceed with the competition, pitting Lee against a female DA. Though initially surprised by the woman's fierceness, Lee ultimately defeats her without killing her as the Clippers leave victorious, Lee now officially a member of the gang.

Back at the Sunya factory, Wickings unsuccessfully tries to convince Bolo and his boss Carver (Robby Benson) that the Clippers can be brought around. Bolo leaves the office to meet Ray, where he scolds the gang leader for failing to bring the Clippers on board, then gives him a gun. This is observed from the rafters by Whitey, but as he attempts to leave he nearly falls and is noticed. Bolo's men give chase and ultimately capture him, and Bolo executes him in front of Ray. Wickings leaves the office in time to see Bolo standing over Whitey's body. The next day she files an electronic report with the government accusing Bolo and Carver of violating company directives, specifically in using armed force to recruit workers, but receives a reply that the two have been authorized to use any and all measures they deem necessary. After being confronted by Bolo, Wickings returns to her quarters where she obtains a schematic of the facility's sewer system and uses it to escape.

As the Clippers prepare to have a funeral for Whitey, Bolo makes plans to ambush the group during the ceremony. Ray begs Bolo for one last chance to convince Mick; Bolo agrees, but readies his men anyway. At the funeral Ray attempts to reason with Mick, but instead starts a brawl between the DAs and Clippers. The brawl is cut short when Bolo and his men open fire on the Clippers, killing many and rounding up others to be used as slave labor. Mick is wounded, but he, Lee, Yogi, Frankie (Pamela Ludwig), Sammie, Ramos (Tony Plana) and a few others escape. Mick leaves for one last meeting with Ray, who tries to convince Mick to leave town as soon as he can. Bolo and a group of men arrive at the meeting and take custody of Mick, tipped off to its location by Ernie. Bolo tasks Ray with bringing Ernie back to the Sunya factory; Ray gives him a ride, but kills him along the way for his betrayal of his former friend. Bolo tortures Mick to reveal the location of the remaining Clippers, but before he can get the information the group arrives, rescues Mick and flees the city for Albert's farm.

The group spends time at Albert's farm recuperating, during which time Lee and Wickings become romantically involved. Lee and Mick form a plan to retake the city from Sunya. The group fix up their bikes, and head to the city, accompanied by Albert in his restored 1950s Cadillac. Wickings and Lee infiltrate the Sunya factory using the sewers, overpower the guard overseeing the captured Clippers' training, and frees the group, leading them back to their impounded motorcycles. The reformed Clippers head back for Sunya to finish the job, only to be stopped by the DAs. Rather than fighting them though, Ray allows them to proceed, and he and the rest of the DAs join the Clippers in their assault on the Sunya factory.

At Sunya, Wickings and Sammy disable the power, allowing the unified gang to attack in the confusion. Bolo arrives soon after, holding the two at gunpoint and turning the power back on. This allows a Sunya vehicle with a mounted machine gun to open fire on the gangs. The advantage is short-lived: assisted by Frankie, Albert takes out the vehicle using an explosive-laden remote controlled model plane. Sammy and Wickings make their escape while Bolo is stunned by the explosion, and Albert crashes a second explosive plane into Bolo, killing him. With most of Sunya's personnel fleeing or dead, Lee, Wickings, Mick and Yogi head for the main building to confront Carver. They find him, but Carver is unimpressed, calmly stating that even if he is killed, someone just like him or worse will be sent in his place. Before anyone else can act Ray drives into the office on his motorcycle, simply responding with, "no", before he crushes Carver between his desk and the wall, killing him.

In the aftermath, the Clippers and DAs unite, becoming the Clippers Corporation. Wickings assists in helping them petition the Federal government to grant them official control of the city, which the government accepts. Lee stays with the Clippers, while Albert returns to his farm.

== Cast ==
- Darrell Larson as Mick
- John Stockwell as Lee
- Kim Cattrall as Wickings
- Rae Dawn Chong as Yogi
- John Diehl as "Whitey"
- Danny De La Paz as Ray
- Don Keith Opper as Sammy
- Norbert Weisser as Bolo
- Pamela Ludwig as Frankie
- Tony Plana as Ramos
- Dean Devlin as Ernie
- Robby Benson as Carver
- James Earl Jones as Albert
- Marcia Holley as Unfriendly DA
- Alan Marcus as Unfriendly DA
- Kane Hodder as Unfriendly DA
- Sean Ryan as Chris
- Catherine Harper as Young Clipper
- Robert Otting as Young Whitey
- Jennifer Balgobin as DA Warrior

== Production ==
Following the success of Android, director Aaron Lipstadt conceptualized City Limits by taking the idea of life in a post-apocalyptic world and making it less about a return to savagery and more about what society would do with a clean slate. Lipstadt wrote the initial treatment for City Limits in London following the successful premiere of Android and showed it to British home video distributor Videoform Pictures, who responded well to it and provided the film's $2.5 million budget. Lipstadt then reunited with his Android collaborator, Don Keith Opper, to write the screenplay. Robert and Dennis Skotak provided the matte and miniature work via their company L.A. Effects Group. Lipstadt stated that his intention with City Limits was less analogous to Lord of the Flies despite both being about societies run by youths without adults, and instead was more in the vein of The Three Musketeers with the film more spiritually aligned with that of a swashbuckler.

== Critical response ==
The Variety review praised the depiction of a tribal society, the action scenes, and the "vibrant" score yet considered the Sunya Corp. plot less convincing, while TV Guide rated the film 2 out of 5 stars.

== In popular culture ==
City Limits was featured in episode #403 of the cult television series Mystery Science Theater 3000, during which Crow T. Robot (performed by Trace Beaulieu) sang tribute to actress Kim Cattrall, who stars in the movie. When Cattrall saw the episode, she arranged for flowers to be sent to Crow.

== Release ==
City Limits was released in theatres on September 1, 1985. It was first released on home video by Vestron Video sometime later. The film was later released on VHS and DVD in 1998 and on 11 September 2007, respectively, by Televista. The Mystery Science Theater 3000 episode featuring City Limits was included in the Volume XXXVI DVD set, which was released on 21 July 2016.
