= Critters (film) =

1986 film directed by Stephen Herek

- Theatrical release poster
- Directed by: Stephen Herek
- Screenplay by: Stephen Herek; Domonic Muir
- Story by: Domonic Muir
- Produced by: Rupert Harvey
- Starring: Dee Wallace-Stone; M. Emmet Walsh; Billy Green Bush; Scott Grimes; Nadine van der Velde; Don Opper; Terrence Mann
- Cinematography: Tim Suhrstedt
- Edited by: Larry Bock
- Music by: David Newman
- Production company: Sho Films
- Distributed by: New Line Cinema
- Release date: April 11, 1986
- Running time: 85 minutes
- Country: United States
- Language: English
- Budget: $3 million
- Box office: $13.2 million (US)

Critters is a 1986 American science fiction comedy horror film directed by Stephen Herek in his directorial debut, and co-written with Domonic Muir. It stars Dee Wallace, M. Emmet Walsh, Billy "Green" Bush and Scott Grimes (in his film debut). The plot follows a group of small, furry aliens with carnivorous behavior escaping from two shape-shifting bounty hunters, landing in a small countryside town to feast on its inhabitants.

Although widely believed to have been inspired by the success of Joe Dante's 1984 film Gremlins, in reality the script was written by Muir around two months before Gremlins went into production and subsequently underwent rewrites to reduce the apparent similarities between the two films. The film grossed $13.2 million during its release in the United States, and spawned a Critters franchise consisting of three sequels and a web series titled Critters: A New Binge released on Shudder. The fifth entry Critters Attack! serves as a reboot of the series.

== Plot ==
On an asteroid prison, a group of dangerous aliens known as Krites are set to be transported to another station. The Krites engineer an escape and hijack a ship, prompting the warden to hire two shape-changing bounty hunters, Ug and Lee, to pursue them to Earth. Studying life on Earth via various satellite television transmissions, Ug assumes the form of rock star Johnny Steele, while Lee remains undecided, thus retaining his blank, featureless head.

On a rural Kansas farm, the Brown family sits down to breakfast. Father Jay and mother Helen send teenage daughter April and younger son Brad off to school while waiting for mechanic Charlie McFadden. A former baseball pitcher, Charlie has become the town drunk and crackpot, with claims of alien abductions foretold by messages through his fillings.

That evening, Brad overhears the Krites' stolen ship crash-landing, and goes to investigate with Jay. They discover a cow that has been partially eaten by the Krites, and, disturbed, flee back to the house. Meanwhile, the Krites kill and feed on a local police officer (later, the bounty hunters take his police car as a method of transport), and later besiege the farm and cut its electrical connection. While checking the circuit breaker, Jay is attacked by one of the Critters and, despite being severely wounded, just barely manages to escape.

In the barn, April is rolling in the hay with her boyfriend Steve Elliot when he is attacked and killed by one of the Krites; the creature itself is slain when it devours one of Brad's lit firecrackers. The remaining Krites sabotage the Browns' and Steve's cars, forcing the Browns to shelter themselves inside their home. Meanwhile, the bounty hunters search the town for the Krites, causing a panic at the church and bowling alley, with the second hunter assuming the form of various townspeople, including Charlie. Brad escapes the farm to get help and runs into the bounty hunters, and upon learning of their true nature and intentions, he leads them to the Krites' location.

The remaining Krites kidnap April and return to their ship when the bounty hunters arrive, and attempt to flee. Charlie and Brad manage to rescue April, but Brad drops a large firecracker he intended to use to destroy the ship when the Critters discover their escape. Just as the Krites take off and destroy the farmhouse out of spite, Charlie throws a Molotov cocktail made from his whiskey bottle into the ship, causing a fire which detonates the cracker and kills the Krites. The bounty hunters give Brad a handheld device to contact them in case of future invasion, and then use their technology to restore the Brown farmhouse. Charlie leaves with Ug and Lee to become an inter-galactic bounty hunter. Unbeknownst to anyone, Krite eggs are seen in the barn inside a chicken's nest that seem to be ready to hatch.

== Cast ==
- Dee Wallace as Helen Brown
- M. Emmet Walsh as Harvey "Harv"
- Billy "Green" Bush as Jay Brown
- Scott Grimes as Brad Brown
- Nadine van der Velde as April Brown
- Don Keith Opper as Charlie McFadden
- Lin Shaye as Sally
- Billy Zane as Steve Elliot
- Ethan Phillips as Jeff Barnes
- Terrence Mann as Ug / Johnny Steele
- Jeremy Lawrence as Reverend Miller / Preacher
- Corey Burton as the voices of the Krites

== Production ==
Critters entered production around 2 months before Gremlins did. Muir finished the first draft for the film on September 9, 1981. The script would sit in storage for around 3 years.

In early drafts the Krites would have walked on four legs and weren’t originally criminals like the final film. The Krites also in early drafts lacked the ability to roll up into a ball.

Herek began a friendship with Muir while working as assistant editors on City Limits (1985). When Herek was looking for his next project, Muir offered him his screenplay for Critters, which he had written three years earlier. After working on the script, he pitched it to Sho Films because of an existing working relationship to get advice on how to get the film made, in which their executives agreed to develop it. Principal photography began in Valencia, California in July 1985 on a six-week shooting schedule.

Special effects coordinator Chuck Stewart hired Joseph Lombardi as a consultant for the scene of the barn exploding, where they rigged second-floor ceiling with Primacord that carried an explosive charge inside it. The sequence of the Critter swallowing a cherry bomb was controlled by puppeteers who were positioned below in a hayloft to operate the stomach and eye movements. Crew member Dwight Roberts commented that it took some effort to coordinate the Critters’ bulging stomach and eyes as it kneeled over in the hay due to the number of people needed to articulate it.

== Release ==
Critters was theatrically released on April 11, 1986 by New Line Cinema, opening across the United States to 633 theaters. It earned $1,618,800 in its opening weekend, and ultimately grossed $13,167,232 at the box office.

== Reception ==
=== Critical response ===
On review aggregator website Rotten Tomatoes, the film has a 53% approval rating based on 51 reviews, with an average of 5.5/10. The site's consensus reads: "While Critters ekes out some fun from a game cast and screwball tone, the titular monsters fail to deliver the credible menace that makes a creature feature satisfying". Metacritic, which uses a weighted average, assigned the film a score of 52 out of 100, based on 11 critics, indicating "mixed or average" reviews. Roger Ebert of the Chicago Sun-Times rated the film three out of four stars: "What makes Critters more than a ripoff are its humor and its sense of style. This is a movie made by people who must have had fun making it".

Marylynn Uricchio, film critic for the Pittsburgh Post-Gazette described the film as an enjoyable, if unoriginal, low budget monster movie. Uricchio wrote: "Critters isn't a memorable or even very slick movie, but it is good fun. What it lacks in substance it makes up for with a perverse kind of charm". Caryn James of The New York Times complained that the movie lacked humor and suspense: "Critters just doesn't make the audience laugh or jump often enough".

Alex Stewart reviewed Critters for White Dwarf #83, and stated that "Critters scuttled by quite pleasantly. Nothing really stands out, despite M. Emmet Walsh as the sweaty sheriff, and a scene wherein a couple of Heavy Metal bounty hunters blow away a Baptist church, but the film actually thinks through how the Browns react, as a family, to the anti-social little aliens".

=== Home video ===
The film was released on VHS and LaserDisc by RCA/Columbia Pictures Home Video after its theatrical release. In September 1997, New Line Home Video re-released the film on VHS. New Line Home Entertainment released Critters on DVD in 2003, and was re-released in a set containing all four Critters films by Warner Bros. in 2010.

Scream Factory released all four Critters films in a set on Blu-ray in November 2018.

== Web series ==
Warner Bros. produced a reboot web series based on the Critters films. Critters: A New Binge premiered on Shudder on March 21, 2019.
