= Critters 4 =

- DVD cover
- Directed by: Rupert Harvey
- Screenplay by: David J. Schow; Joseph Lyle
- Story by: Rupert Harvey; Barry Opper
- Produced by: Rupert Harvey; Barry Opper
- Starring: Don Keith Opper; Paul Whitthorne; Jonas Brindley; Angela Bassett; Anders Hove; Eric Da Re; Brad Dourif
- Cinematography: Thomas L. Callaway
- Edited by: Terry Stokes
- Music by: Peter Manning Robinson
- Production company: Oh Films
- Distributed by: New Line Home Video
- Release date: October 14, 1992
- Running time: 94 minutes
- Country: United States
- Language: English

Critters 4 is a 1992 American science fiction comedy horror film starring Don Keith Opper, Terrence Mann, Angela Bassett and Brad Dourif. It is the fourth installment in the Critters franchise, filmed simultaneously with part three, from February to July 1991. Unlike the first three films, this installment adopts a darker, less-comedic tone, and takes place not on Earth, but on a space station in the year 2045.

== Plot ==
Picking up where the previous film left off, Charlie McFadden is stopped from destroying two Krite eggs by a hologram message from Ug, who tells him the eggs are the last two in existence, and that destroying them would go against intergalactic law. Charlie reluctantly obeys Ug's orders, and goes to place the eggs in a preservation pod that suddenly falls from the sky. Whilst doing so, however, the hatch closes on him and Charlie is launched into space, becoming deep-frozen in the process.

Over a half-century later, in 2045, the crew of the salvage ship RSS Tesla finds the pod in deep space and bring it aboard. The ship is crewed by the shady and lecherous Captain Rick Buttram, along with his eccentric engineer Al "Albert" Bert, pilot Fran, cargo specialist Bernie, and young engineer apprentice Ethan. After reporting their find, the ship gets a communication from Councilor Tetra of TerraCor, who offers Buttram three times the going rate if he brings the pod to a nearby station. The crew accepts, and decide to go to the station, only to find the facility abandoned, with the only sign of life being a malfunctioning central computer named "Angela" that only obeys orders when given the exact opposite instruction.

Ethan later stumbles upon Rick tampering with the pod, with Rick saying that he plans to take whatever is inside for himself and leave the others behind. Ethan expresses disapproval, and Rick knocks him unconscious with a fire extinguisher before he manages to open the pod. In it, he encounters Charlie, who quickly jumps out, before Rick is attacked and killed by the newly hatched Krites.

After the Krites flee, Charlie revives Ethan, before he eventually meets up with the rest of the crew. Charlie explains who he is and warns the crew about the Krites, but Bernie refuses to believe him and heads off. Ethan then uses a computer keycard he found earlier to access a report made by Dr. McCormick, who reveals that she was conducting research on various alien organisms for use as a bioweapon. Her creations however could not reproduce on their own and she requested finding a suitable organism capable of rapid reproduction. After realizing what has been going on aboard the station, Albert strongly suggests they all leave it immediately.

Later, Bernie is attacked and killed by the Krites in the station's pharmacy. After the others find his remains, Angela announces that the reactor is leaking radiation and will go critical within hours, and starts sealing off sections of the station. The crew later discover a clutch of freshly laid Krite eggs, and learn the Krites are breeding. Meanwhile, the Krites make their way to the Tesla and program the ship to head for the nearest inhabited planet – Earth. One Krite goes to retrieve the eggs while the rest prepare the ship for take-off. The crew then arrives and encounter the Krites, upon which Charlie shoots and kills them, only to inadvertedly destroy the flight controls in the process.

Whilst the crew tries to repair the ship, Ethan heads off to hunt down the last Krite himself, and finds it using equipment in the science lab to rapidly grow several baby Krites to full size. Ethan runs to warn the others just as a Terracor ship arrives, carrying Tetra, Ug and other troopers, whom hold the surviving crew at gunpoint. Tetra demands the Krite eggs, and shoots and kills Albert when he tries to talk back. Charlie expresses despair over Ug's sudden change in alignment, to which Ug says "things change" and orders his troops to go find the eggs.

Ethan, having secretly witnessed Albert's murder, runs back to the science lab and sets up a trap for the troops by having Angela trap them behind sliding doors, whereupon the Krites attack and kill them. Ethan then retrieves three of the Krite eggs from the tunnel, and deliberately breaks two of them in front of Tetra. Enraged, Tetra threatens to kill Fran, but Ethan tosses the last egg as a distraction before Fran uses Ethan's revolver to knock Tetra unconscious.

Charlie and Fran rush aboard Tetra's ship to escape, but Ethan gets distracted when a Krite attacks him, forcing him to freeze it with a fuel hose. Tetra suddenly appears and holds him at gunpoint, but Charlie rescues him and shoots Tetra in the head, before the survivors manage to escape mere seconds before the station explodes, rendering the Krites extinct as Charlie, Fran and Ethan fly their ship towards Earth.

== Cast ==
- Don Keith Opper as Charlie McFadden
- Terrence Mann as Ug / Counselor Tetra
- Angela Bassett as Fran
- Brad Dourif as Albert 'Al" Bert
- Anne Ramsay as Dr. McCormick
- Paul Whitthorne as Ethan
- Anders Hove as Captain Rick Buttram
- Eric Da Re as Bernie
- Martine Beswick as the voice of Angela
- Jonas Brindley as Dr. Franky

== Release ==
Critters 4 was released on VHS on September 1, 1998, by New Line Home Entertainment. The film was released on DVD on September 14, 2005, by Warner Home Video. Critters 4 was re-released in a set containing all four Critters films on DVD September 7, 2010, by Warner Home Video.

Shout! Factory released the four films as part of "The Critters Collection" on Blu-ray. The set was released on November 27, 2018.

== Web series ==
Warner Bros. produced a reboot web series based on the Critters films. Critters: A New Binge premiered on Shudder on March 21, 2019.
