= Aaron Lipstadt =

American film director

- Born: November 12, 1952 (age 73); Southington, Connecticut, US
- Occupations: Film/television director and producer
- Years active: 1980–present
- Website: alipstadt.com

Aaron Lipstadt (born November 12, 1952) is an American film director, television director and producer.

In 1980, he began his career as assistant production manager on the film Battle Beyond the Stars. He continued to manage productions for the films Saturday the 14th (1981), Galaxy of Terror (1981), Forbidden World (1982) and The Slumber Party Massacre (1982). In 1982, he made his directorial debut with the film Android. In 1984, he directed the film City Limits.

Since 1986, he has focused primarily on directing television. His television credits include Miami Vice, Crime Story, The Equalizer, Quantum Leap, Law & Order, Law & Order: Special Victims Unit, Law & Order: Trial by Jury, The Division, Medium, The 4400, Elementary and many other series.

== Filmography ==
Actor

Year	Title	Role	Notes
1982	The Slumber Party Massacre	Pizza Boy	
1998	Where's Marlowe?	Festival Director	
2003	Manhood	Gordon	
2005	Crazylove	Judge Milton	(final film role)
