= Don Keith Opper =

American actor, writer, and producer (born 1949)

- Born: June 12, 1949 (age 76); Chicago, Illinois, United States
- Other names: Don Opper
- Occupations: Screenwriter, film producer, actor
- Years active: 1980–2005

Don Keith Opper (born June 12, 1949) is an American actor, writer, and producer who has starred in film and on television. He is best known for his role as Charlie McFadden in the 1986 science fiction film Critters and each of the three sequels. His most recent film role is in Albert Pyun's 2005 horror film Infection. Opper has made guest appearances on many TV shows, including Miami Vice, Quantum Leap, 21 Jump Street, Roseanne, Harsh Realm and The Division.

== Early life ==
Opper is the son of a Chicago salesman. He worked as a clown, puppeteer, bookstore employee, studio grip and unrecognized writer before he did carpentry at Roger Corman's shop and found the chance to make Android. He has two daughters.

== Filmography ==
Year	Title	Functioned as			
Year	Title	Actor	role	Writer	Notes
1980	Battle Beyond the Stars	No		No	second assistant director
1981	Galaxy of Terror	No		No	production coordinator
1982	Android	Yes	Max 404	Yes	Credited as "himself"
1984	City Limits	Yes	Sammy	Yes	
1986	Black Moon Rising	Yes	Emile French	No	
1986	Critters	Yes	Charlie McFadden	Yes	additional scenes
1987	Slam Dance	Yes	Buddy	Yes	
1988	Critters 2: The Main Course	Yes	Charlie McFadden	No	
1989	The Forgotten	Yes	Sergeant Peter Lowell	No	Television film
1991	The Great Pretender	Yes	Marco	No	Television film
1991	Critters 3	Yes	Charlie McFadden	No	
1992	Critters 4	Yes	Charlie McFadden	No	
1992	The Gun in Betty Lou's Handbag	Yes	Dell	No	
1993	Painted Desert	Yes	Montana	No	
1993	Ghost in the Machine	Yes	Man in Office	No	
1996	Suddenly	Yes	Barney	No	
1998	Where's Marlowe?	Yes	Composer	No	
2005	Supernova	No		Yes	Television film
2005	Infection	Yes	Deputy Ben	No	Voice acting
2005	Painkiller Jane	No		Yes	Television film, also executive producer
