= Android (film) =

1982 science fiction film directed by Aaron Lipstadt

- Theatrical release poster
- Directed by: Aaron Lipstadt
- Written by: James Reigle; Don Keith Opper; James Reigle; Will Reigle
- Produced by: Mary Ann Fisher
- Starring: Klaus Kinski; Brie Howard; Don Keith Opper
- Cinematography: Tim Suhrstedt
- Edited by: R.J. Kizer; Andy Horvitch
- Music by: Don Preston
- Production company: Sho Films
- Distributed by: New World Pictures
- Release date: October 16, 1982
- Running time: 80 minutes
- Country: United States
- Language: English

Android is a 1982 American science fiction film directed by Aaron Lipstadt and starring Don Keith Opper and Klaus Kinski. The film tells the story of a scientist and his assistant who are working on an illegal android program in their laboratory on a space station in deep space.

The film was voted Best Science Fiction Film in 1983 by The Age, but received a mixed reaction from critics and viewers.

== Plot ==
In 2036, an android named Max 404, and his creator, Dr. Daniel, reside aboard a remote space station. Although Max is a machine, he has a growing interest in all things human, especially sex. After Daniel starts to notice Max's character is changing, Max eavesdrops on the doctor's report that Max's growing insubordinate behavior could lead to a revolt similar to an incident back on Earth known as the "Munich Rebellion", after which androids were outlawed. However, Daniel is illegally working on another android, Cassandra One, intended to be a superior machine and which has the form of a human female.

Max receives a distress call from a ship that seeks repairs. Upon hearing the pilot's female voice, Max excitedly permits them to land, not realizing that the ship is a prison transport and that the pilot, Maggie, and her associates, Keller and Mendes, are all escaped fugitives. Once aboard the station, the convicts settle in, posing as the transport's crew (who had actually been killed during the prison break). Daniel becomes infuriated upon learning that Max allowed the ship to land and demands they leave immediately, but after meeting the attractive Maggie, Daniel invites her to have dinner.

Maggie joins Daniel but the dinner goes wrong when a jealous Max pranks the doctor with some embarrassing mischief, such as metal shot in the wine bottle, and cutting the doctor's orchids. Daniel then asks Maggie if she would link up with Cassandra One in an attempt to transfer sexual experiences to the android. Learning that she would have to be sexually stimulated by the doctor during the procedure, Maggie declines the offer. Daniel becomes frustrated and demands Maggie's help, but she makes a hasty exit. Returning to the lab, Daniel dictates a log report, again overheard by Max, that once Cassandra is ready, Max should be deactivated because of showing signs of the Munich Syndrome.

While the criminals work on the ship, a TerraPol police cruiser arrives, having detected a still-active transponder on their ship, and contacts Max to inform them of their presence. Max denies that the fugitives are on board, even after checking the crew's identity and confirming they are indeed escaped convicts. When the police demand permission to land, Max destroys their ship with a laser.

Max later tells Maggie that he knows she is a fugitive, but has saved her from the police, and asks that she take Max with her when she leaves the station. Maggie is unsure what to do, but later sneaks away from Mendes and meets Max in the lab for an intimate encounter. However, the two are interrupted when Cassandra activates, and Maggie is horrified when Cassandra reveals that Max is also an android.

Maggie returns to her quarters, but she is confronted by a furious Mendes, who demands to know where she wandered off to. When he notices her disheveled appearance and unbuttoned shirt, he begins to beat her. Keller interrupts and tries to stop Mendes, but he is knocked unconscious. Mendes then attacks Maggie again in her quarters. Later, when Keller awakens, he sees Maggie is dead and believes Mendes has killed her. He searches for him and finds him in a room of spare android parts. Mendes states there are enough parts to build an android of their own, but Keller attacks him from behind. The two struggle, but Keller is overpowered and Mendes kills him with a blow to the head.

Eventually Max arrives, suitcase in hand, at Maggie's quarters, but finds her dead. Max returns to Daniel's lab, where the doctor is already aware of the murder and has locked Mendes in the guest lounge. Daniel has Max sit in a chair and opens a panel on the back of his head to reprogram him for a new task, during which he tells Max that murder must be punished and Mendes is to blame. Daniel reprograms Max and sends him out to kill Mendes. In the meantime, more police ships arrive to forcefully board the station.

After killing Mendes, Max goes to Maggie's room, touches her lifeless body, and finds a flashlight Dr. Daniel said had earlier been misplaced. Max now realizes that it was Daniel who had killed Maggie, not Mendes. Max returns to the lab, where Daniel has made sexual advances towards a now-completed Cassandra, who is resisting. Daniel asks Max to hold Cassandra, but when Max refuses to obey, Daniel begins to struggle with the two androids and eventually they rip off Daniel's head, revealing that Daniel is also an android. Cassandra disposes of Daniel's head in a trash chute and begins to reprogram Max. She tells Max they are not meant to obey the whims of men, and there are other androids on earth in hiding, and Cassandra has a plan to join them.

When the police arrive at the lab, Cassandra thanks them for coming to their rescue. Max is now dressed in a lab coat and posing as Dr. Daniel and Cassandra as the assistant. The two androids are escorted out by the police, who say they will take them back to Earth.

== Cast ==
- Klaus Kinski as Dr. Daniel
- Don Keith Opper as Max 404 Android
- Brie Howard as Maggie
- Kendra Kirchner as Cassandra One Android
- Norbert Weisser as Keller
- Crofton Hardester as Mendes
- Randy Connor as Terrapol: Landing Party
- Gary Corarito as Terrapol: Neptune
- Mary Ann Fisher as Terrapol: Neptune
- Julia Gibson as Terrapol: Minos
- Roger Kelton as Terrapol: Landing Party
- Darrell Larson as Terrapol: Neptune
- Ian Scheibel as Terrapol: Neptune
- Wayne Springfield as Terrapol: Minos
- Rachel Talalay as Terrapol: Landing Party
- Johanne Todd as Terrapol: Landing Party

In the closing credits, Max 404 plays "himself", and the technical credits maintain the conceit that the film character Max 404 is played by an actual android called Max 404.

== Production ==
The film was completely filmed in four weeks and edited in a further three weeks. The original version was 80 minutes long and none of the original content was removed before release.

The film cost less than $1 million to make.

David Elliott wrote, "This movie was done on a scrawny budget for the Roger Corman schlock shop. Its makers believed in the film so much that they up-scaled it from pure schlock, and Corman -- a producer who believes in talent but even more in a buck -- lost interest after early bookings failed to come up green. Corman felt the film was not 'exploitable,' and so Barry Opper (brother of Don) and initiating producer Rupert Harvey bought the rights. Android became one of those budding cult movies that may never thrive in big money terms but which refuse to play dead."

The Miami Herald reviewer Bill Cosford would write in 1984, after the movie's tour of the festival circuit in 1982 and 1983, "Android has gained something of a cult reputation already, largely on the strength of its success on a shoestring budget. Set in the year 2036, the film uses space-station sets and quasi-futuristic props crafted of leftovers from Roger Corman's B-movie backroom (there's a bit of Forbidden World here, some Galaxy of Terror there)."

== Release ==
Joseph Bensoua said that, in 1982, Corman began test marketing Android in cities such as Tucson, Spokane and Las Vegas, but met unsatisfactory results. Producers Rupert Harvey and Barry Opper bought the film rights back from Corman in 1983. They opened the film in London, where The Observer called it "the sleeper of the year."

== Reception ==
David Elliott wrote in a celebratory review, "Max 404, the hero of Android, adds flesh to the tradition of cute robots that goes back to Robby the Robot in Forbidden Planet, Huey, Dewey and Louie in Silent Running and the metallic darlings R2-D2 and C-3PO in Star Wars. As played by Don Opper, he looks perfectly human. The fun comes from watching Max discover just how human he is... This is a jewel in the rough, and roughness (along with wit) is what gives it a shine. There are shadowy, sub-slick sets (partly lifted from old Cormanoids like Battle Beyond the Stars), and the plot features three grubby space outlaws -- two varmints and a vamp -- played with lots of slumming gusto by Brie Howard, Norbert Weisser and Crofton Hardester... Max is a bit of a wimp, but brainy, and with a heart of computerized gold. He is keen on self-programming, and he studies old, 20th century movies and gently bones up on the human styles of Humphrey Bogart and James Stewart... After the villains break in, Max figures out that being human means that you get to bend the rules. The plot turns, and there's a neat, tricky resolution... You can hardly fail to enjoy it."

Bill Cosford praised the film's wit and the performances, such as "Klaus Kinski, in another surpassingly creepy performance" and Opper's Max "as a nebbishy Woody Allen type." Cosford said that the filmmakers "have laced their story with clever touches. It's not just the old movies and the music and the giggles over Max's impossible puberty. Their tone is a gentle but sophisticated ribbing of the conventions of science-fiction films from Metropolis (1927 film) to Star Wars, with just enough "inside" references to the form to make watching fun, but not so many as to turn Android into a feature-length skit. There is even room for some philosophical musing here, for those so inclined. But it is not necessary. The director, Aaron Lipstadt, has made the kind of first film, like George Lucas' THX 1138 and John Carpenter's Dark Star, that suggests a creative intelligence behind even the rough spots."

Joe Baltake wrote that the movie "is a kind of SciFi version of Rebel Without a Cause, a game fantasy about children rebelling against their parents. In this case, the children (Don Opper and Kendra Kirchner) are androids, robots, and the parent (Klaus Kinski, of all people, in a fright wig) is a mad scientist... Android pays tribute to Fritz Lang's Metropolis ... Having been emotionally locked into puberty by Daniel, Max does what most children do - plays video games, watches old movies (such as Metropolis) and, of course, has a keen interest in S-E-X. With nothing to interfere with the way he's been programmed by Daniel, Max pretty much lives in a retarded state - that is, until a trio of criminal fugitives - two men, one woman - stow away inside Daniel's space lab... The vicious stowaways are on hand merely to inspire Max's rebellion against his parental figure. The film's real fillip comes when Cassandra, the female android, turns out to be Max's accomplice, rather than his competitor, and is hot to join him in his plan. In fact, she takes charge: "We are not meant to be governed by the whims of men," the blonde, stoic Cassandra says matter-of-factly, but with a comic, ambitious edge to her voice. Android is small, very small and, what's more, it's human. In an odd way, it succeeds in being what The Pope of Greenwich Village never comes close to accomplishing."

Joseph Bensoua called it "slow-moving space junk... Its 81-minute length, economical (make that cheap) sets and talky script give it a texture that's more akin to a Twilight Zone episode -- only not as good." Rick Lyman, similarly, described the movie as "a lazy, whimsical sci-fier," while sympathizing with Max, "an outer-space Holden Caulfield - young, confused, yearning to get away from his strict surroundings and cut loose in the big city (in this case, the planet Earth). His performance is the best thing about the movie. His Max is hopelessly sweet and naïve, way too trusting for his own good. He's the only character in the movie exhibiting the least bit of compassion or tenderness."

Colin Greenland reviewed Android for Imagine magazine, and stated that "Android is a neat little film, showing what can be done on a small budget with ingenuity and care."

John Nubbin reviewed Android for Different Worlds magazine and stated that "With films like Star Trek III, Indiana Jones & the Temple of Doom, and a number of others, 1984 is looking to be a better year. Android, with its clever dialogue, tight plotting, and clever twists looks to be a part of that good year. Filled with a wide range of humor, from slap-stick to black comedy, it is aimed at a mature, thinking audience, just the kind of picture the genre, and its weary audiences [...] not only need, but deserve."

== Soundtrack ==
The soundtrack includes songs by James Brown (It's a Man's Man's World), Django Reinhardt (Heavy Artillery) and The Fibonaccis (Sergio Leone).

== See also ==
- A.I. Rising
- Ex Machina
- List of films featuring space stations
