= Roxanne Kernohan =

Canadian actress (1960–1993)

- Born: Roxane Bridget Furman; March 20, 1960; Canada
- Died: February 5, 1993 (aged 32); Santa Clara, California, U.S.
- Occupation: Actress
- Years active: 1988–1991

Roxane Bridget Kernohan (née Furman; March 20, 1960 – February 5, 1993) was a Canadian actress. She is best known for her role in the science fiction comedy horror film Critters 2: The Main Course (1988).

== Career ==
Kernohan began her career in 1988 when she appeared in the low-budget slasher film Fatal Pulse. She appeared in several other films during 1988 including Roger Corman remake Not of This Earth, the post apocalyptic action film She-Wolves of the Wasteland and the film for which she is best known, Critters 2: The Main Course, where she plays "Lee", the bounty hunter. The same year she appeared in the documentary The Decline of the Western Civilization Part II: The Metal Years. In 1989, she appeared in the action film Tango & Cash and the Playboy documentary Playboy: Sexy Lingerie. In 1990 she starred in Angel III: The Final Chapter, and her final film came in 1991 when she played herself in the direct-to-video film Scream Queen Hot Tub Party.

== Death ==
In 1993, Kernohan died of injuries following a car accident.

== Filmography ==
- 1988 Genesee Cream Ale Commercial as Dancer
- 1988 Fatal Pulse as Ann
- 1988 Critters 2: The Main Course as Lee
- 1988 Not of This Earth as Lead Hooker
- 1988 She-Wolves of the Wasteland as Meda
- 1988 The Decline of Western Civilization Part II: The Metal Years (documentary)
- 1988 L.A. Guns: Sex Auction as Seductive Woman #1 (uncredited) (music video)
- 1989 Cheap Trick: Never Had a Lot to Lose as Front Row Fan (music video)
- 1989 Tango & Cash as Dressing Room Girl
- 1989 Playboy: Sexy Lingerie (documentary)
- 1989 Playboy: Party Jokes as Herself
- 1989 Bold and the Beautiful as Diana (S3 E16)
- 1990 Angel III: The Final Chapter as White Hooker
- 1991 Scream Queen Hot Tub Party as Herself
