= Critters: A New Binge =

- Genre: Comedy horror Science fiction
- Based on: Critters by Domonic Muir
- Starring: Joey Morgan; Stephi Chin-Salvo; Bzhaun Rhoden; Kirsten Robek; Gilbert Gottfried; Thomas Lennon
- Country of origin: United States
- Original language: English
- No. of seasons: 1
- No. of episodes: 8

Production
- Executive producers: Jordan Rubin; Al Kaplan; Jon Kaplan; Peter Girardi
- Running time: 9-11 minutes
- Production companies: New Line Cinema; Blue Ribbon Content; Triton Media

Original release
- Network: Shudder
- Release: March 21, 2019

Critters: A New Binge is an American comedy horror television series that premiered on Shudder on March 21, 2019. A reboot of the original franchise, the series takes place in Livingston, Iowa and features all new characters.

== Premise ==
The Krites arrive on Earth on a secret mission to rescue a missing comrade. Standing in the way of their plans are a group of high school students: Christopher (Joey Morgan), his crush Dana (Stephi Chin-Salvo), and his best friend, Charlie (Bzhaun Rhoden). The teens soon receive help in the form of three intergalactic bounty hunters.

== Cast and characters ==
- Joey Morgan as Christopher
- Stephi Chin-Salvo as Dana
- Bzhaun Rhoden as Charlie
- Kirsten Robek as Veronica
- Gilbert Gottfried as Uncle Murray
- Thomas Lennon as Mr. Weber
- Tom Pickett as Bounty Hunter #1
- Toby Levins as Bounty Hunter #2

== Episodes ==
No.	Title	Directed by	Written by	Original release date
1	"No Eating"	Jordan Rubin	Al & Jon Kaplan	March 21, 2019
2	"Beginnings"	Jordan Rubin	Al & Jon Kaplan	March 21, 2019
3	"Party Time"	Jordan Rubin	Al & Jon Kaplan	March 21, 2019
4	"Veronica"	Jordan Rubin	Al & Jon Kaplan	March 21, 2019
5	"Detention"	Jordan Rubin	Al & Jon Kaplan	March 21, 2019
6	"For Crites Sake"	Jordan Rubin	Al & Jon Kaplan	March 21, 2019
7	"Split Decision"	Jordan Rubin	Al & Jon Kaplan	March 21, 2019
8	"The Final Battle"	Jordan Rubin	Al & Jon Kaplan	March 21, 2019

== Production ==
=== Development ===
In 2014, Warner Bros. announced plans to produce a web series based on the Critters films. Producer Peter Girardi at Warner Bros. Digital reached out to writer-director Jordan Rubin to see if he was interested in the project. Rubin put together a pitch for the series with his writing partners, Jon and Al Kaplan, and the project was greenlit.

=== Filming ===
Principal photography for the series reportedly began during the last week of May 2018 in Vancouver, British Columbia, Canada. Filming wrapped in July.

=== Release ===
Shudder acquired the series from Warner Bros. Television in February 2019. All eight ten-minute episodes premiered on Shudder on March 21.

== Reception ==
The series received mixed reviews. Bloody Disgusting gave the series one-and-a-half skulls, declaring the "CG effects are so Syfy-level bad that they wouldn’t have even passed muster back in the ’90s" and the episodes "absolutely loaded with that bargain basement effects work" and "lowbrow humor". JoBlo gave the series a 6 out of 10, saying that "there's going to be a split reaction to A New Binge. I don't think the story crafted by Rubin and his co-writers Al Kaplan and Jon Kaplan is one that anybody was expecting to see told in this franchise". Ultimately, the review felt it was "a very innocuous piece of entertainment".
