= Critters 3 =

- Promotional release poster
- Directed by: Kristine Peterson
- Screenplay by: David J. Schow
- Story by: Rupert Harvey; Barry Opper
- Produced by: Rupert Harvey; Barry Opper
- Starring: Aimee Brooks; John Calvin; Leonardo DiCaprio; Geoffrey Blake; Don Opper
- Cinematography: Thomas L. Callaway
- Edited by: Terry Stokes
- Music by: David C. Williams
- Production company: Oh Films
- Distributed by: New Line Home Video
- Release date: December 11, 1991
- Running time: 85 minutes
- Country: United States
- Language: English

Critters 3 is a 1991 American science fiction comedy horror direct-to-video film and the third installment of the Critters series, directed by Kristine Peterson. The film stars Aimee Brooks, John Calvin, Katherine Cortez, Don Keith Opper, and Leonardo DiCaprio in his film debut. It was shot simultaneously (from February to July 1991) with its sequel Critters 4. Unlike the first two films, it does not take place in the town of Grover's Bend.

== Plot ==
Annie, her little brother Johnny and their father Clifford are on their way home from vacation when one of their van's tires blows out, forcing them to stop at a rest area. While Clifford fixes the tire, Johnny and Annie meet Josh, stepson of their corrupt landlord Briggs. While wandering into the forest to retrieve their frisbee, they encounter Charlie McFadden, the bounty hunter who is after the Critters. Before they leave, Charlie gives Johnny a crystal, telling him it will glow bright green when it is "time to watch out for yourself and your family". Meanwhile, an unseen Critter lays eggs beneath the family's van and the family leaves, unknowingly taking the eggs with them.

Soon after they arrive at their tenement, the Critters hatch and sneak into the basement, where they kill the sleazy maintenance man Frank. When Rosalie goes to the basement, she is attacked by the Critters before being rescued by Annie. Meanwhile, Briggs arrives at the tenement to evict the residents, with Josh reluctantly accompanying him. When Briggs enters a room with Critters inside, Josh, having grown distasteful of his stepfather, shuts the door, unintentionally trapping him with the Critters, who fatally attack him.

After one of the residents is attacked and wounded, Annie, her family and five others (including Josh) try to reach safety by going to the roof of the building. Charlie arrives and destroys the remaining Critters, saving the remaining tenants. As Charlie is about to destroy the last two Critter eggs, Ug appears via a hologram and says he must not eliminate any lifeform if it means termination of the species, adding that the Intergalactic Council is sending a collection pod for the eggs. The film ends on a cliffhanger as the pod crashes into the basement.

== Cast ==
- Aimee Brooks as Annie
- John Calvin as Clifford
- Katherine Cortez as Marcia
- Leonardo DiCaprio as Josh
- Geoffrey Blake as Frank
- Diana Bellamy as Rosalie
- William Dennis Hunt as Briggs
- Frances Bay as Mrs. Menges
- Bill Zuckert as Mr. Menges
- Don Keith Opper as Charlie McFadden
- Nina Axelrod as Betty Briggs
- Christian and Joseph Cousins as Johnny
- Terrence Mann as Ug
- Jose Luis Valensuela as Mario
- Stephen Chiodo, Charles Chiodo and Edward Chiodo as Critter voices
- William Hanna as Critter's screams and shrieks

== Release ==
The film was released direct-to-video by New Line Home Video on December 11, 1991. New Line Home Entertainment released it on DVD in 2003. It was also released in a set containing four films on DVD by Warner Bros. in 2010.

Scream Factory, a subsidiary of Shout! Factory, released the four films as part of The Critters Collection on Blu-ray. The set was available from November 27, 2018.

== Reception ==
Review aggregation website Rotten Tomatoes gives the film an approval rating of 0%, based on reviews from seven critics, with an average rating of 2.8/10.
