= Emilia Ares =

Armenian-American actress

- Born: Emilia Ares Zoryan
- Other name: Emilia Ares
- Education: University of California, Los Angeles
- Occupations: Actress; producer; novelist
- Years active: 2011–present

Emilia Ares is an Armenian-American film and television actress, producer, and author. Her award-winning debut contemporary fiction novel, Love and Other Sins, encompasses complex family dynamics, immigration, the aftermath of trauma and the thrum of first love. In 2024, Ares released her critically acclaimed sophomore novel, Love and Other Cages. Kirkus called it “a heart-wrenching thriller with multiple twists that will keep readers hooked until the final page.” Love and Other Cages appeared in Publisher's Weekly's 50th-anniversary edition where BookLife called it “a sprawling romantic thriller… Tense, surprising, and powered by grand surges of feeling. Ares brings real power and fear.”

== Early life ==
Emilia Ares grew up in Los Angeles, California. She toured locally and internationally with a dance company since she was five years old. Ares graduated from Palisades Charter High School with honors. She graduated from UCLA with a BA in economics and minored in Russian language. Ares also completed several courses on the history of film.

Ares finished as 1st Runner-up in Miss Global 2013 beauty pageant, representing Armenia.

== Career ==
=== Advertisements ===
Ares is most recently recognized for her national Verizon spot featuring Thomas Middleditch and national Jergens campaign featuring Leslie Mann for Jergens Wet Skin Moisturizer.

She has appeared in many ads some of which include appearances for Apple, Sony, Coca-Cola, and a PSA called "Time" for the American Academy of Dermatology.

=== Film ===
Ares made her film debut in Falling Overnight (2010) as Chloe Webb, a young photographer who meets and develops a relationship with Elliot Carson (Parker Croft) on the day before he has surgery to remove a malignant brain tumor. Subsequently, Ares has worked on several film projects, including V/H/S: Viral (2014) and The Dark Tapes (2016). Ares played Natalie in Mr. Invincible alongside Bill Engvall and Alyson Stoner. Ares also appeared in Will Wernick's anticipated Escape Room follow-up, No Escape (2020).

=== Television ===
For Ares's first television appearance, she landed the role of Anastasia on Unstrung, an ABC Family one-hour pilot from Life Unexpected executive producer Emily Whitesell.

Ares had a guest star role, under the name Emilia Ares, in the second season of detective TV series Bosch from Amazon Studios. The series is based on the novels centered on the character of the same name by Michael Connelly. The second season of the series was released on Amazon Prime Video on 11 March 2016. Ares portrayed Grand Duchess Anastasia Nikolaevna of Russia in the Fox series American Horror Story.

== Filmography ==
=== Film ===
Year	Title	Role	Notes							
2011	Falling Overnight	Chloe Webb								
2011	My Trip to the Dark Side	Sam								
2013	Tangential Lives	Lillian	Short film							
2013	Covetous	Amelia	Short film							
2013	Tissue	Emilia	Short film							
2014	V/H/S: Viral	Iris	Segment: "Vicious Circles"							
2016	The Dark Tapes	Caitlin	Segment: "Cam Girls"							
2018	Mr. Invincible	Natalie								
2020	Follow Me	Viktoria	-	2026	Fey	Erin	-	2026	Sideslip	Tavia McCaffrey

=== Television ===
Year	Show	Role	Notes				
2014	Unstrung	Anastasia	Episode: "Pilot"				
2016	Bosch	Layla	Recurring role; 7 episodes				
2018	American Horror Story: Apocalypse	Anastasia Nikolaevna of Russia	Episode: "Fire and Reign"				
2020	NCIS	Layla Zolotov	Episode: "On Fire" -	2026	NCIS	Olia Volkinov	Episode: "Return of the Mack"

=== Music videos ===
Year	Title	Role	Artist
2009	"Rollacoasta"	Lead Girl	Robin Thicke ft. Estelle
2011	"Where Them Girls At"	Ballerina	David Guetta ft. Nicki Minaj
2013	"Hold On, We're Going Home"	Guest	Drake
2014	"The Wolfpack"	Sam	Angels & Airwaves

=== Producer ===
Year	Title	Notes
2019	Burden	Short film; also co-executive producer
2020	Sebastian's Toys	Television mini-series; also executive producer, director and writer
