= White Mountain School =

Coordinates: 44°16′49″N 71°45′30″W

The White Mountain School
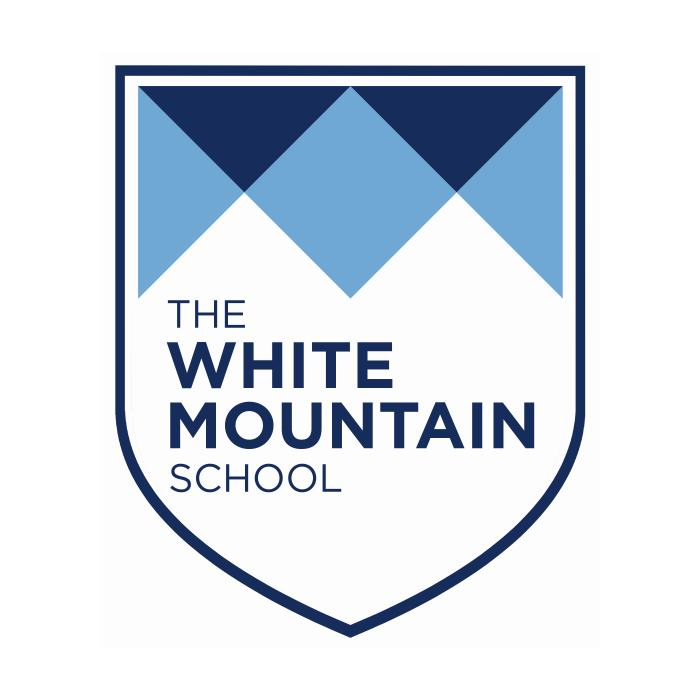
- Bethlehem, NH; US

Information
- Type: Private, boarding and coeducational
- Motto: Levavi Oculos In Montes
- Religious affiliation: Episcopalian
- Established: 1886
- Head of School (interim): Donald Ball
- Teaching staff: 21.1 (on an FTE basis)
- Enrollment: 140 (2021)
- Student to teacher ratio: 5.5
- Campus: Rural; 250 acres (100 ha)
- Colors: Blue, White
- Endowment: $2 million
- Website: www.whitemountain.org

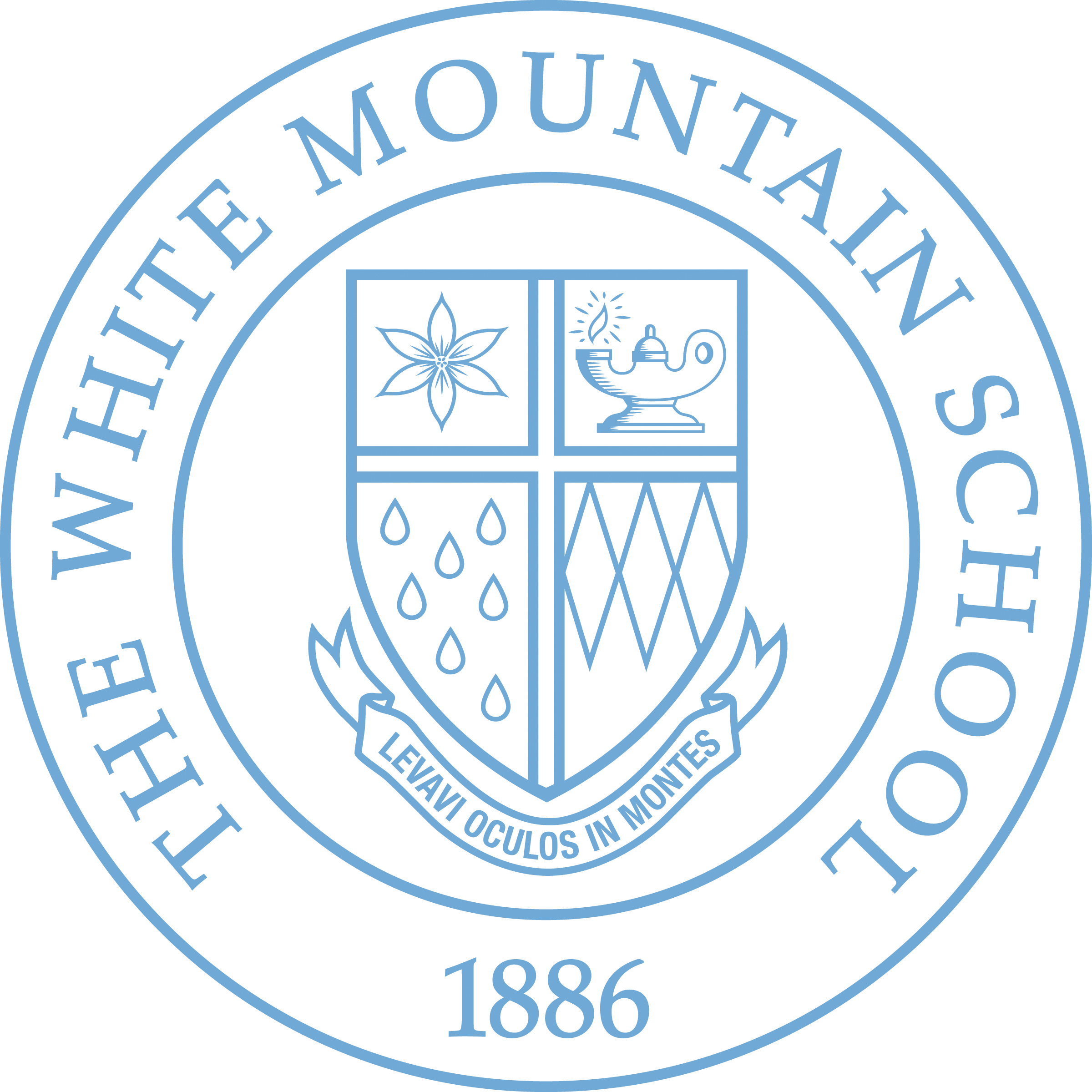

The White Mountain School, often called White Mountain or WMS, was a co-educational, independent boarding school located in Bethlehem, New Hampshire, United States. Established in 1886 as St. Mary's School in Concord, New Hampshire, the school moved to its second location in 1936, situated just north of the White Mountains of New Hampshire. The school ceased operations in 2024, citing insurmountable financial challenges.

== History ==
The White Mountain School was founded in 1886 as an all-girls Episcopal high school called St. Mary's School in Concord, New Hampshire. In 1935, Dorothy McLane, the school's headmistress, moved the school north into the White Mountains region, to the estate of Ernest Poole in Sugar Hill, New Hampshire; the school was then renamed St. Mary's-in-the-Mountains. One year later in 1936, the school bought the Seven Springs Estate, in Bethlehem, New Hampshire, from Eman and Mary Payne Beck and relocated there for the last time. Over the next 25 years, the Bethlehem campus expanded with the purchase of new dormitories and the construction of new classroom wings. On January 3, 1964, the school's Main Building burned down. The following year, a new Main Building was constructed in its place. Six years later, in 1970, the school began accepting a small number of male day students, and in 1972 the school became co-educational and changed its name to the White Mountain School.

The school ceased operations after the conclusion of the 2023-24 academic year, citing financial difficulties relating to declining enrollment.

== Academics ==
The White Mountain School curriculum was structured in a traditional liberal arts model. Each discipline offered a range of courses from introductory-level, Honors, Advanced Placement, to student-designed independent studies. Year-long courses were worth one credit; semester courses were worth ½ credit. To graduate, students needed earn 19 academic credits, including a minimum of 4 credits in English, 2 ½ credits in history, 3 credits in mathematics, 3 credits in science, 2 credits in world language, 1 credit in the arts, ½ credit in philosophy and religious studies and ½ credit in sustainability studies. (The White Mountain School was the first high school in the US to add Sustainability Studies as an academic department.) In addition, students must complete two Field Courses per year and a LASR Project.

The White Mountain School Field Course was a week-long, academic exploration of a specific topic that occurs within an appropriate geographic setting. It occurred in October and March for five days in length. Courses included Poverty, Homelessness and Hunger (Portland, Maine), Adirondack Art and Adventure (New York), Island Culture and Ecology (Acadia National Park, Maine), Avalanche Forecasting (Wyoming & Idaho), A Walk in Thoreau's Shoes (Massachusetts), Gender & Politics: Women's Rights in the US (Washington, DC), Desert Ecology of the Southwest (Tucson, Arizona), Community Service Odyssey (Dominican Republic), Writing for Performance: Exploration of Performing Arts (New Hampshire), Buddhism (The Vermont Zen Center, Shelburne, Vermont), Green Living in the Urban World: Sustainability & Service (Montreal), Carving Up Equations to Carve the Slopes: The Math of Ski and Snowboard Design (Vermont & New Hampshire).

"LASR" in the White Mountain School LASR Project stands for the general categories that students can pursue: Leadership, Arts, Service and Research. Students choose from several approaches to completing the project, including (but not limited to) the following courses: Research Seminar, Art Portfolio, Independent Study, Senior Project, and Field Course Leadership.

== Faculty and advisors ==
Every student had a faculty advisor who communicated with parents throughout the year and served as a primary liaison between student, family, and teacher. 67% of the faculty held advanced degrees as well as a variety of additional certifications.

== Student body ==
The White Mountain School enrolled students from around the country and the world, with roughly equal amounts of male and female students in later years. 76% of the student population boarded and 24% were day students from surrounding towns.

== Campus ==
The school's 250-acre (100 ha) campus is located between the towns of Bethlehem and Littleton on a hilltop providing views of the White Mountains. The McLane Academic Center housed the classroom wing, multimedia center and learning labs. The school library offered more than 7,000 volumes, an online catalog, several online databases, and an inter-library loan system with Dartmouth College and the University of New Hampshire. The Fred Steele Science Center was equipped with SMART Board interactive technology and laboratories which allowed for a wide range of independent projects. The Catherine Houghton Arts Center housed dance, visual arts, and music studios. The school partnered with Creative Edge Dance Studio to offer academic courses as well as technique and performance-based classes for students of all dance styles and levels.

The 3,000-square-foot (280 m^{2}) indoor Beverly S. Buder climbing wall was located inside an indoor sports center outfitted with Nautilus equipment, free weights and aerobic equipment. The campus also had two athletic fields, an extensive trail system, and a school farm, including a student-built post and beam shed; a chicken coop with hens; an organic vegetable and fruit garden; and composting bins.

Boarding students lived in one of four dorms with their peers, faculty members and faculty families. Each dorm had common space with couches, a TV and a microwave. The dining hall served breakfast, lunch, and dinner, and was available for drinks and light snacks all day.

On weekends, faculty offered a range of activities for students. Activities included outdoor outings such as moonlight hikes, ski trips or mountain bike riding; shopping trips to outlet centers, Burlington, or the local towns; art excursions to movies, plays, and art exhibits; campus sponsored cultural events, cookie baking in faculty kitchens and games.

== Athletics and co-curricular activities ==
The White Mountain School was a member of the Lakes Region Athletic League of the New England Preparatory School Athletic Council. Activities included:

Adventure sports

- All-mountain skiing and snowboarding
- Ice climbing
- Freestyle skiing and snowboarding
- Mountain biking
- Sport climbing
- Outdoor rock climbing
- Whitewater kayaking

Team sports

- Cross-country
- Cycling
- Boys lacrosse
- Girls lacrosse
- Boys soccer
- Girls soccer

Co-curricular activities

- Dance
- Farm and Forest
- Robotics
- Theater

The White Mountain School's rock climbing program was the first high school program to earn accreditation from the American Mountain Guides Association (AMGA). The sport climbing program partnered with USA Climbing to provide multiple opportunities for competition. Students who chose to pursue outdoor sports learned the technical aspects of climbing and explore topics as minimum-impact travel, first aid, navigation, orienteering, trip planning, and natural history.

== Costs and financial aid ==
Tuition, room and board for the 2016-17 academic year was $57,900. Day student tuition was $29,000. Learning Center tutorials and the ESL Program have additional fees. 40% of students received financial aid, with an average award of $40,000. Eligibility was based on need as established by School and Student Services (SSS) by National Association of Independent Schools.

== Notable alumni ==
- Lucy Nettie Fletcher, WWI nurse
- Lucile Wheeler '52, Olympic skier, first North American to win a world title in the downhill event
- Audrey Thomas '53, novelist and short story writer, three time recipient of the Ethel Wilson Fiction Prize
- Will Gadd '85, renowned ice climber and paraglider pilot
- Parker Croft '05, film actor and screenwriter, known for Falling Overnight and Once Upon a Time (TV series)
