= Jon and Al Kaplan =

American songwriter

Jon Kaplan
- Born: Jonathan Z. Kaplan; April 6, 1976 (age 50); Manhattan, New York City, New York, U.S.
- Occupations: Composer, lyricist, writer
- Notable work: Zombeavers; Critters: A New Binge
- Relatives: Al Kaplan (brother)

Al Kaplan
- Born: Alexander Kaplan; July 23, 1978 (age 48); Manhattan, New York City, New York, U.S.
- Occupations: Composer, lyricist, writer
- Notable work: Zombeavers; Critters: A New Binge
- Relatives: Jon Kaplan (brother)

Jonathan Z. "Jon" Kaplan (born April 6, 1976) and Alexander "Al" Kaplan (born July 23, 1978) are brothers who are American composers, lyricists and comedy writers. They are best known for creating the musical Silence! The Musical, a parody of the film The Silence of the Lambs, which began life on the internet in 2002 before becoming a successful stage musical starting in 2005. They have also created musical parodies of other films and television shows, including various Arnold Schwarzenegger films such as Conan the Barbarian, Predator and Commando. Jon and Al scored and co-wrote the films Zombeavers (2014) and The Drone (2019), along with the Shudder series Critters: A New Binge (2019).

== Early life and family ==
Jon and Al Kaplan were born in Manhattan and grew up on Staten Island, several minutes drive from the Fresh Kills Landfill. The Kaplans' father Nathan was a music teacher/composer-turned dentist, who exposed his sons to concert music, film music and musicals at an early age, before his death. Their mother, Elizabeth Kaplan, now referred to as Liz Alt, continues to teach chorus at P.S. 53. They have a younger sister, Caroline, who is a portrait artist who used to collect leaves and coins.

Jon and Al moved to Los Angeles in 1996 to study concert composition and film music at USC. They graduated in 1999 and 2000, respectively.

After graduation, Jon and Al went to work at the offices of Film Score Monthly magazine, where they did everything from write and edit articles to stuff thousands of subscription renewals into envelopes. This period would see the Kaplans pursue screenwriting, with the brothers penning several spec scripts, none of which sold. Their most notorious project was Peni5 (1999), later titled Bigger, the story of a high school student with a small penis who takes black pills to make his penis gigantic, but he overdoses and his penis keeps growing and starts to murder people.

== Works ==
=== Silence! The Musical ===
In 2002, the duo composed, performed and produced a nine-song Silence of the Lambs musical, Silence! The Musical, which they put online to avoid burning CD-Rs for their friends. Despite social networking sites like Facebook and Myspace not yet having taken hold, Silence! quickly became a viral sensation, appearing in magazines such as Entertainment Weekly and Maxim, and on radio shows like Opie & Anthony and Howard Stern's 100.

In 2005, the brothers composed several new songs and expanded Silence! into a full stage musical. They wrote an Airplane!-styled screenplay, Silence! The Musical, that was adapted for the stage by Hunter Bell, and the show was mounted by director Christopher Gattelli at the 2005 NYC Fringe festival, where it won the "Overall Excellence Award" for Outstanding Musical. In 2010, Silence! re-opened in London at the Above The Stag Theatre to positive reviews. In June 2011, Silence! returned to New York, opening off-Broadway at Theatre 80, starring Brent Barrett as Hannibal Lecter and Jenn Harris as Clarice Starling. The NYC show moved to the Elektra Theatre at Times Square, closing in July 2013. In August 2012, Silence! opened at The Hayworth Theatre in Los Angeles and played 67 performances.

=== 24: Season Two: The Musical ===
In 2008, Jon and Al composed their second full-length musical, 24: Season Two: The Musical. In 2014, the Kaplans finally began producing videos, uploading them to YouTube.

=== The Schwarzenegger musicals ===
In 2010, Jon and Al launched a series of one-off musicals on their YouTube channel 'Legolambs' that would feature entire films distilled into single songs in a matter of three to four minutes. The most successful of the videos featured Al performing the singing voice of Arnold Schwarzenegger. Conan the Barbarian: The Musical, Predator: The Musical, Terminator 2: The Opera, Commando: The Musical and Total Recall: The Musical are among the Kaplans' most widely seen works to date.

=== Other musicals ===
Jon and Al's musicals have also targeted Sylvester Stallone in Rambo: First Blood Part II and Peter Weller in RoboCop. Other YouTube musicals by the brothers include John Carpenter's The Thing, Super Mario Bros. The 8-Bit Opera, Schindler's List and Rocky IV.

=== Film and TV music ===
In 2006, Jon and Al landed their first television scoring assignment as two of several dozen composers providing uncredited music for the NBC reality show Starting Over. (They were hired by another composer who was a fan of Silence!.) In 2007, they scored (for clarinet, violin and piano) the John Ford silent film entitled Just Pals, included in the "Ford at Fox" DVD box set. The Kaplans also wrote all of the Super NES-styled underscore for G4's cartoon series Code Monkeys, which ran for two seasons.

In 2010, Jon and Al scored The Hills Have Thighs, an erotic film that aired on HBO, Cinemax, Showtime and TMC, and also co-scored with Chuck Cirino the Sci-Fi Channel original film Dinocroc vs. Supergator, for which they delivered the spaghetti western theme. In 2012, they scored Syfy's Piranhaconda.

In 2013, the Kaplans scored the horror feature Zombeavers, for which they also co-wrote the screenplay with director Jordan Rubin

In 2024, the Kaplans created "It's a Terrifier Christmas" for the horror feature Terrifier 3, which was performed by Alaine Kashian and the Budapest Scoring Orchestra.

=== John Williams ===
In 2010, Jon and Al wrote, recorded and produced a short Lego video in which Darth Vader helps John Williams compose the Imperial march. On August 30–31, 2013, Williams introduced and showed the video at his annual Hollywood Bowl concerts with the L.A. Philharmonic. The short was again featured by Williams and David Newman during their 2019 Bowl concert.

=== Comedy writing ===
After several unsold pilots, Jon and Al were hired to write for the 2009 MTV Movie Awards, where the final show featured their Best Song presenter patter for Leighton Meester and Lil Wayne.

=== The Lonely Island Medley ===
While working as comedy writers on the 2009 MTV Movie Awards, Jon and Al arranged Andy Samberg's "Lonely Island Medley", performed by LeAnn Rimes, Chris Isaak and Forest Whitaker.

== Awards ==
Saturn Award - Theatre Showcase Award 2012 - "Jon and Al Kaplan - Silence! The Musical" in LA.

Los Angeles Drama Critics Circle Award 2012 - Musical Score - Silence! The Musical in LA.

Off Broadway Alliance Award 2012 - Best New Musical - Silence! The Musical in NY.

Lortel Award Nomination 2012 - Best Musical - Silence! The Musical in NY.

Time Magazine's Top 10 Plays and Musicals 2011 - Silence! The Musical in NY.

NYC Fringe Festival Overall Excellence Award for Outstanding Musical 2005 - Silence! The Musical.

== Critical reception ==
Reviews for the songs of Jon and Al have been largely positive. The original nine Silence! songs made Entertainment Weekly's "Must List" in 2004: "Cannibalism is deliciously served up in this tuneful and crass re-telling of Silence of the Lambs." On the Opie & Anthony Show in 2004, Jim Norton said "['Put the Fucking Lotion in the Basket'] is your 'Welcome to the Jungle'...it's fantastic." In reference to the 2005 staged production of Silence!, Rob Kendt of The New York Times called the songs "terrible (and vulgar)."

The reception of the London run of Silence! was met with considerable praise, with Carole Gordon of whatsonstage.com declaring, "****. Totally crack-pot, yet brilliantly hysterical parody of the multi Oscar-winning movie." Clare Webb of totallytheatre.com said of the same "Above The Stag Theatre" run, "****. Uproariously funny and jaw-droppingly outrageous in equal measures, and chances are you will never again see anything quite like it."

Silence!'s 2011 Off Broadway run was met with great critical praise, but the 2012 LA production received the show's best reviews to date.

Reaction to the Kaplans' Schwarzenegger songs has also been enthusiastic, with favorable write-ups in Salon.com and elsewhere.
