= Matt Shapira =

American artist, director and producer (born 1977)

- Born: June 2, 1977 (age 49); U.S.
- Occupations: Painter, Director, Cinematographer and Producer
- Years active: 2010–present

Matt Shapira is an American artist, director and producer. He is best known for directing the comedy feature film Swing of things, and for his Roaming Elephant art works.

== Life and career ==
Shapira was born in Los Angeles, California. He spent eleven years as a talent agent along with his father David Shapira. In 2017, his feature film Big Muddy starring Brian Thompson, Brian Thomas Smith and Kassandra Clementi, premiered at St. Louis International Film Festival and won best film at the Niagara Falls International Film Festival. He has chosen to focus his attention and painting on Indian and African Elephants, his work can be seen all over the world, on canvas, murals, clothing apparel and more. He worked with NGO's across the globe to raise awareness and funds for conservation of elephants. His recent feature film work on the Lionsgate released comedy The Swing of Things, starring Adelaide Kane, Luke Wilson and Carolyn Hennesy.

== Filmography ==
Year	Film	Writer	Director	Producer	Notes
2020	Finding Love in Quarantine	✓	✓	✓	Feature Film
2020	The Swing of Things	✗	✓	✗	Feature Film
2019	Disappearance	✓	✓	✓	Feature Film
2018	The Reason	✗	✗	✓	Feature Film
2018	I Am That Man	✗	✗	✓	Feature Film
2017-2018	Malibu Dan the Family Man	✗	✗	✓	TV series
2018	Behind the Walls	✗	✗	✓	Feature Film
2017	Big Muddy	✓	✓	✓	Feature Film
2016	God's Not Dead 2	✗	✗	✓	Feature Film
2016	Drowners	✗	✗	✓	Short Film
2015	Dancer and the Dame	✗	✗	✓	Feature Film
2015	Do You Believe?	✗	✗	✓	Feature Film
2014	God's Not Dead	✗	✗	✓	Feature Film
2012	Apple in the Rain	✓	✓	✓	Short Film
2011	Beneath the Wheel	✓	✓	✓	Short Film
2011	A Needle's Point	✗	✓	✗	Short Film
2010	Mere Image	✓	✗	✓	Short Film

=== As cinematographer ===
- Sunflower (2019)
- Behind the Walls (2018)
- Big Muddy (2017)
- The Dark Tapes (2016)
- Drowners (2016)
- Apple in the Rain (2012)
- Week in Beauty (2012)
- A Needle's Point (2011)
- Beneath the Wheel (2011)
- Mere Image (2010)
