= Sushi Girl =

2012 American crime film by Kern Saxton

- Promotional poster for Sushi Girl
- Directed by: Kern Saxton
- Screenplay by: Destin Pfaff; Kern Saxton
- Produced by: Neal Fischer; Destin Pfaff; Kern Saxton; Suren M. Seron
- Starring: Tony Todd; Noah Hathaway; James Duval; Andy Mackenzie; Mark Hamill; Cortney Palm; Sonny Chiba
- Cinematography: Aaron Meister
- Edited by: Kern Saxton
- Distributed by: Magnet Releasing; Gryphon Entertainment
- Release date: June 21, 2012 (Canada)
- Running time: 98 minutes
- Country: United States
- Language: English
- Budget: $750,000

Sushi Girl is a 2012 American crime film directed by Kern Saxton and starring Tony Todd, Mark Hamill, Noah Hathaway, Sonny Chiba and Cortney Palm. Tony Todd also served as an executive producer. It premiered at the TCL Chinese Theatre played in several festivals and was then released directly to home media in 2012.

== Plot ==
Fish has been recently released from prison where he was serving time for his part in a diamond heist. He refused to give the authorities any information on his partners in crime or reveal to them the location of the stolen diamonds. In order to locate and divide the stolen diamonds, crime boss Duke invited Fish to dinner along with the rest of the gang, including his closest ally Crow, Max and Francis. The meal is sushi, served on the naked body of a woman, the titular Sushi Girl, who must remain motionless and silent for the duration of the meal.

When Fish tells the others that he doesn't have the diamonds, they do not believe him. He is tied up, with Max and Crow taking turns torturing him. Duke instructs Francis to take a turn as well, but he refuses. Francis goes to the bathroom and it is revealed to the camera that he is wearing a listening device. The sequences of torture are intercut with flashbacks to the heist, culminating in the gang being run off the road by another car, with Duke shooting the driver in order to escape. Eventually Max loses control and begins to beat Fish, killing him.

Max, Crow and Duke begin to argue about who was responsible for Fish's death. Francis comes back from the bathroom, and wants to leave, accusing Duke of arranging this dinner in order to kill them all, and thus wrap up loose ends. Duke, in turn, accuses Francis of being a spy for the police. The others demand that Francis unbutton his shirt and prove that he is not wearing a wire. Francis responds by insulting Duke and taunting Max. Max finally loses control and assaults Francis, tearing open his shirt, thus revealing that there is no listening device. Despite this, Francis is shot by Duke.

After more arguing the remaining three eventually draw their guns on one another and shooting breaks out. Only Duke survives. He returns to the Sushi Girl, who has remained silent and motionless all this time. Duke tells her that she is to be his "consolation prize". He eats a piece of fugu from her body and promptly succumbs to paralysis, whereupon she sits upright and tells him the fugu was purposely prepared leaving the toxins intact. A final flashback reveals that she was present at the heist's aftermath; it was her husband whom Duke shot, and she who recovered the diamonds after the bag was ripped open. She explains that she used her newfound riches to arrange this night and take her revenge upon the gang, and then she shoots Duke fatally and departs.

== Cast ==
- Tony Todd as "Duke"
- Noah Hathaway as "Fish"
- James Duval as Francis
- Andy Mackenzie as Max
- Mark Hamill as "Crow"
- Cortney Palm as Sushi Girl
- Sonny Chiba as Sushi Chef
- David Dastmalchian as Nelson
- Jeff Fahey as Morris
- Michael Biehn as Mike
- Danny Trejo as Schlomo

== Release ==
The production team behind Sushi Girl raised the money for the world premiere via crowdfunding site Kickstarter and the film debuted at TCL Chinese Theatre on November 27, 2012. The film has been played at a range of festivals, including Montreal's Fantasia International Film Festival in 2012 and Melbourne's Supanova Pop Culture Expo in 2013. The film enjoyed a limited theatrical run in February 2013 following its VOD premiere in November 2012, and has subsequently been released on DVD, Blu-ray and digital platforms.

== Reception ==
Sushi Girl has received mixed reviews. Rotten Tomatoes reports that four of seven critics gave the film a positive review; the average rating is 5.9/10. Variety stated that "Sushi Girl makes a strong impression with a lurid, finely twisted plot, but its excessive cruelty leaves a foul aftertaste," and the Toronto Star gave it two stars out of four and described it as being overly derivative of the work of Quentin Tarantino. Film Threat was more forgiving, likewise identifying it as being derivative but stating that due to "the power of great performances, Sushi Girl had me hooked from beginning to end, and I can’t wait to see it again." HorrorMovies.ca's review praised the film's style, calling particular attention to the torture scenes, which it called "memorable."
