= Noah Hathaway =

American actor and a former teen idol (born 1971)

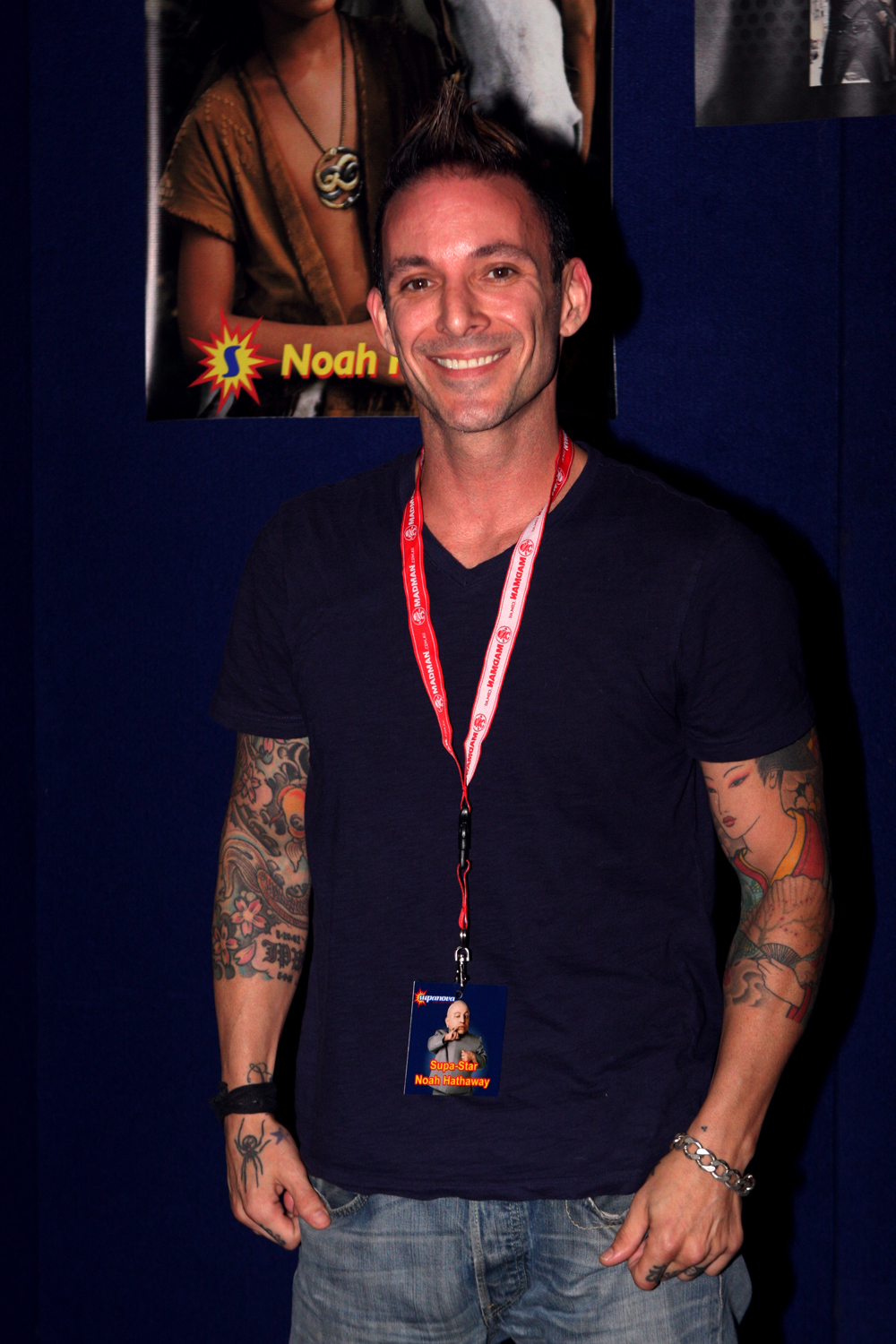
- Hathaway in 2012
- Born: Noah Leslie Hathaway; November 13, 1971 (age 54); Los Angeles, California, U.S.
- Occupation: Actor
- Years active: 1977–present

Noah Leslie Hathaway (born November 13, 1971) is an American actor and a former teen idol. He is best known for his roles as Atreyu in the 1984 film The NeverEnding Story and for portraying Boxey on the original television series Battlestar Galactica. His work in The NeverEnding Story made him particularly popular as a teen idol in Europe.

== Career ==
=== Early work ===
Hathaway was born in Los Angeles, California. He began appearing in commercials at age three, and later starred in several TV films and series, including an episode of Family Ties, episode 4 of season 4 called “Designated Hitter.” At the age of six he appeared in Battlestar Galactica, portraying Boxey, for which he received a nomination in the first Young Artist Awards.

=== The NeverEnding Story ===
He was cast as Atreyu in the 1984 film The NeverEnding Story. He received his second Young Artist Awards nomination and won the award for Best Younger Actor in the 12th Annual Saturn Awards.

For the role Hathaway performed his own stunts, leading to a few near-injuries; German director Wolfgang Petersen said:

I sought a good-looking boy of athletic build with the quality of fierce determination. The role requires the character to ride a horse expertly, fly on the back of a dragon, struggle through a swamp, clamber over rocks and fight a ferocious wolf-vampire.

Hathaway observed:

Well, what it was — Wolfgang Petersen was notorious for his actors doing their own stunts. His actors are always getting hurt, because he wanted — audiences are very savvy; you can cut away and show the back of somebody and show the stuntman doing their stunt. And everybody knows that, so he wants his actors to do as much as they can for the realism of the movie. Accidents happen, and actors aren't stuntmen. That's why they have stuntmen, because if someone gets hurt, they're "expendable." And some of the times, they're just more careful. I just ended up paying.

Hathaway has said that, during the time he worked as a tattoo artist, he could see for himself the film's ongoing popularity, as clients regularly requested tattoos of the AURYN amulet his character wore, in the film. He claims to have given fifteen different clients AURYN amulet tattoos in three weeks.

=== Later roles ===
In 1986, Hathaway starred in Troll, as Harry Potter Jr., and in the television movie Casebusters, as Jamie. Hathaway did not return to acting until 1994, in the film To Die, to Sleep, in his first adult role. After a second hiatus as an actor, Hathaway returned in 2011 for the films Mondo Holocausto! as Ruggero Margheriti, and Sushi Girl as Fish.

In 2016, Hathaway reprised his role from The NeverEnding Story for a Spotify commercial celebrating the 1980s.

== Personal life ==
Hathaway attended school at Lycée Français de Los Angeles. He moved into dance instruction, teaching advanced jazz and street dance until an injury forced him to quit in 1989 at age eighteen. Trained in martial arts, Hathaway would later earn black belts in Tang Soo Do and Shotokan Karate, and also competed as a Muay Thai boxer, and learned American Kenpo from Dr. Jerry Erickson. Hathaway spent some of his time at the Willow Springs Raceway in Rosamond, California competing in supersport motorcycle racing, and designing and riding "chopper" motorcycles.

He was on tour with WizardWorld Conventions and appeared at the Chicago and Philadelphia shows in 2011. He appeared at the Supanova Pop Culture Expo in Sydney, Australia in June 2012.

== Filmography ==
=== Film ===
Year	Title	Role	Notes
1980	It's My Turn	Homer's Son	
1981	Separate Ways	Jason Colby	
1982	Best Friends	Lyle Ballou	
1984	The NeverEnding Story	Atreyu	Saturn Award for Best Performance by a Younger Actor; Nominated—Young Artist Award for Best Young Actor in a Motion Picture – Musical, Comedy or Adventure
1984	Quest	—N/a	Short film
1986	Troll	Harry Potter Jr.	
1994	To Die, to Sleep	Phil	
2012	Sushi Girl	Fish	
2012	Mondo Holocausto!	Ruggero Margheriti	
2013	Blue Dream	Roper Karlsson	

=== Television ===
Year	Title	Role	Notes
1978–1979	Battlestar Galactica	Boxey	13 episodes Nominated—Young Artist Award for Best Juvenile Actor in a Television Series
1979	High Midnight	Timmy	Television movie
1979	Supertrain	Kid	Episode: "Superstar"
1979	The Last Convertible	Teddy	3 episodes
1980	Mork & Mindy	Jud	Episode: "Little Orphan Morkie"
1980	Eight Is Enough	Jerry	2 episodes
1982	CHiPs	Tommy	Episode: "Ice Cream Man"
1982	Laverne & Shirley	Kevin Swisher	Episode: "Lightning Man"
1984	Simon & Simon	Patrick Jessup	Episode: "Almost Completely Out of Circulation"
1985	Call to Glory	Boy in French Class	Episode: "JFK: Part Two"
1985	CBS Storybreak	—N/a	2 episodes
1985	Family Ties	Adam Galardner	Episode: "Designated Hitter"
1986	The Magical World of Disney	Jamie	Episode: "Casebusters"
1986	Wildfire	—N/a	Unknown episodes
2013	Twisted Tales	Dale	Episode: "Boom"

== Awards and nominations ==
- 1980 - Young Artist Award for Best Juvenile Actor in a TV Series or Special - Nominated
- 1985 - Young Artist Award for Best Young Actor in a Motion Picture - Musical, Comedy, Adventure or Drama - Nominated
- 1985 - Saturn Award for Best Performance by a Younger Actor - Won
- 1986 - Young Artist Award for Outstanding Young Actor - Animation Voice Over - Nominated

== See also ==
- List of former child actors from the United States

== Bibliography ==
- Holmstrom, John. The Moving Picture Boy: An International Encyclopaedia from 1895 to 1995, Norwich, Michael Russell, 1996, p. 389-390.
