= Hutch Dano =

American actor (born 1992)

- Born: Hutchings Royal Dano; May 21, 1992 (age 34); Santa Monica, California, U.S.
- Occupations: Actor; painter; plastic artist
- Years active: 2009–present
- Relatives: Royal Dano (grandfather); J. Walter Ruben (great-grandfather); Virginia Bruce (great-grandmother)

Hutchings Royal Dano (/ˈdeɪnoʊ/ DAY-no; born May 21, 1992) is an American actor and painter. He is known for playing co-lead character Zeke Falcone in the Disney XD comedy series Zeke and Luther.

== Early life ==
Dano was born in Santa Monica, California. He comes from a family of actors, including his father Rick Dano and paternal grandfather Royal Dano. His great-grandmother Virginia Bruce was an actress in the 1930s and 1940s and his great-grandfather J. Walter Ruben was a writer and director.

== Career ==
Dano was cast in his first commercial at the age of five, when his mother and father, also actors, took him along to their commercial audition. Dano began doing summer theater for four years before being discovered by casting director Orly Sitowitz at the age of 15. He started taking acting classes with Gary Marks and also with Jorge Luis Pallo at the Scott Sedita Studios.

Dano was booked for the lead role of Zeke in the pilot episode of Zeke and Luther (2009) for Disney's XD Channel. After wrapping his first season, Hutch booked the role of Henry, starring opposite Selena Gomez in the 20th Century Fox feature Ramona and Beezus (2010), playing Beatrice "Beezus" Quimby's friend Henry Huggins. Dano also guest-starred on Disney Channel's The Suite Life on Deck (2008).

Dano guest starred on Law and Order: LA in 2010, for which he received a nomination in the 32nd Young Artist Awards in the Guest Starring Young Actor 18–21 category for a performance in a TV series. He also appeared in an episode of White Collar in 2011. In 2014, Dano played the role of Sam, the cheating boyfriend who gets his just reward in the horror comedy Zombeavers.

Since 2014 he has focused on painting and plastic art as his main career. In 2017, he featured in the horror movie Behind the Walls. In 2019, Dano starred in the film Hoax, and in the film Disappearance, which he also co-wrote.

== Filmography ==
=== Film ===
Year	Title	Role	Notes
2010	Ramona and Beezus	Henry Huggins	
2013	Feels So Good	Evan	
2014	Zombeavers	Sam	
2016	Sunflower	Blake	
2017	Behind the Walls	Michael Harper	
2019	Disappearance	Blake	also co-writer, producer
2019	Hoax	Justin Johnson	
2023	As Certain as Death	Richard	
2024	Down Below	Daryl	

=== Television ===
Year	Title	Role	Notes
2009; 2011	The Suite Life on Deck	Moose	Episodes: "Mulch Ado About Nothing", "Twister: Part 2"
2009–2012	Zeke and Luther	Zeke Falcone	Lead role
2010	Law & Order: LA	Luke Jarrow	Episode: "Playa Vista"
2010	Den Brother	Alex Pearson	Television film
2011	White Collar	Scott Rivers	Episode: "Scott Free"
2011	Peter Punk	Zeke Falcone	Episode: "El Duelo"
2015	Double Daddy	Lucas	Television film
2016	Change of Heart	Judd	Television film
2016	The Encounter	JD	Episode: "The Heist"
2017	Training Day	Butler	Episode: "Wages of Sin"
2020	Shameless	Dash	Episode: "This is Chicago!"
2025	Doctor Odyssey	Alfonse	1 episode

=== Web ===
Year	Title	Role	Notes
2013	Breaking Fat	Matt	Lead role
