= Cortney Palm =

American actress and author (born 1987)

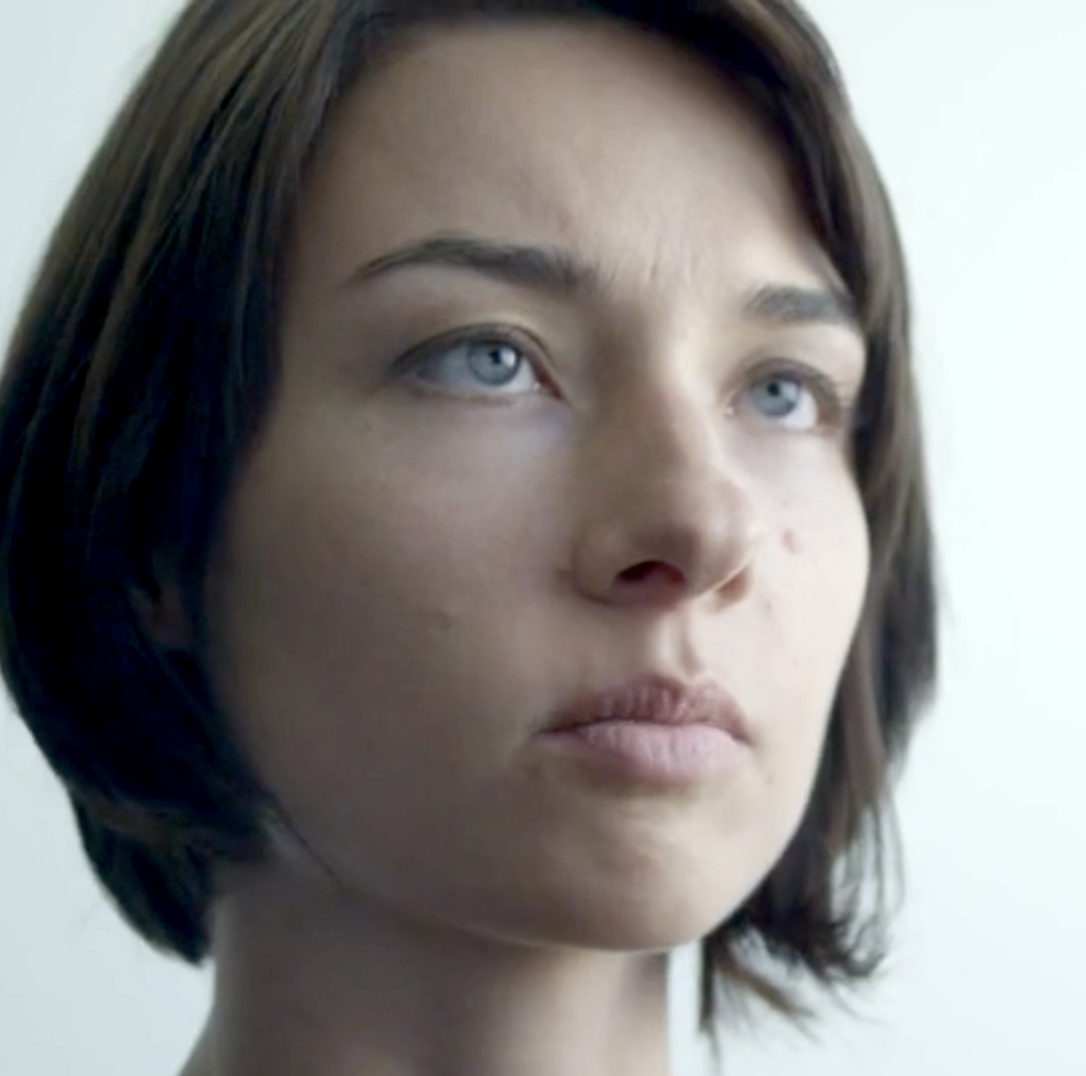
- Palm in 2016
- Born: Cortney Nacole Palm; February 20, 1987 (age 39); Castle Rock, Colorado, U.S.
- Education: California Lutheran University
- Occupation: Actress
- Years active: 2006–present
- Known for: Sushi Girl; Zombeavers
- Notable work: The Dark Tapes; Death House; Hacksaw; Silent Night

Cortney Nacole Palm (born February 20, 1987) is an American actress who appeared in the films Zombeavers, The Dark Tapes and Sushi Girl.

== Early life ==
Palm was born on February 20, 1987, in Castle Rock, Colorado. In 2001, she won a beauty pageant while attending Castle Rock Middle School. Palm moved to California at the age of 18 to study theater at California Lutheran University.

== Career ==
Palm's career began after she was cast in the titular role of Sushi Girl. She played Zoe in Zombeavers, Isabelle in Disappearance and Maria in Steven C. Miller's Silent Night, a loose remake of Charles E. Sellier Jr.’s 1984 classic Silent Night, Deadly Night. Her role in Death House was cast on short notice. In 2021, she starred in Beyond Paranormal.

== Filmography ==
Year	Title	Role	Notes
2006	The Woodland Haunting 2	Ghost Girl	
2007	Superbad	Party Guest	
2009	Lost Soul	Abigail	
2009	Sunday Morning High	Tabitha	
2009	Where's Tuesday Monday?	Charity	
2010	Alice in Wonderland	Red Queen's Court	
2010	Fragile Hearts	Tracy Campbell	Short film
2010	Slings and Arrows	Lori	Short film
2010	The Haymaker	Stacy	Short film
2011	$lowdown	Sarah	Short film
2011	Denton Rose's Short's	Actress	
2011	Losing Ferguson	Rebecca	Short film
2011	See How They Run		
2012	Sushi Girl	Sushi Girl	
2012	Silent Night	Maria	
2012	The Hit Girl	The Girl	
2012	Hallow Pointe		
2013	Gemini Rising	Comatose woman	
2013	Everlasting	Kami	
2014	Electric Slide	Jan's Girl	
2014	Zombeavers	Zoe	
2014	Demon Legacy	Demon Dana	
2015	Slow Fade	Zoe	Short film
2016	Female Fight Squad	Kate	
2016	Tourbillon	Daniela	
2017	The Dark Tapes	Nicole	
2017	Death House	Agent Toria Boon	
2017	Assumption	(voice)	Short film
2017	Up North	Herself	Episode narrator
2019	Disappearance	Isabelle Belanger	
2020	Hacksaw	Teryn	
2021	Beyond Paranormal	Lilly	
2023	As Certain as Death	Kayla	
