= Marisa Ramirez =

American actress (born 1977)

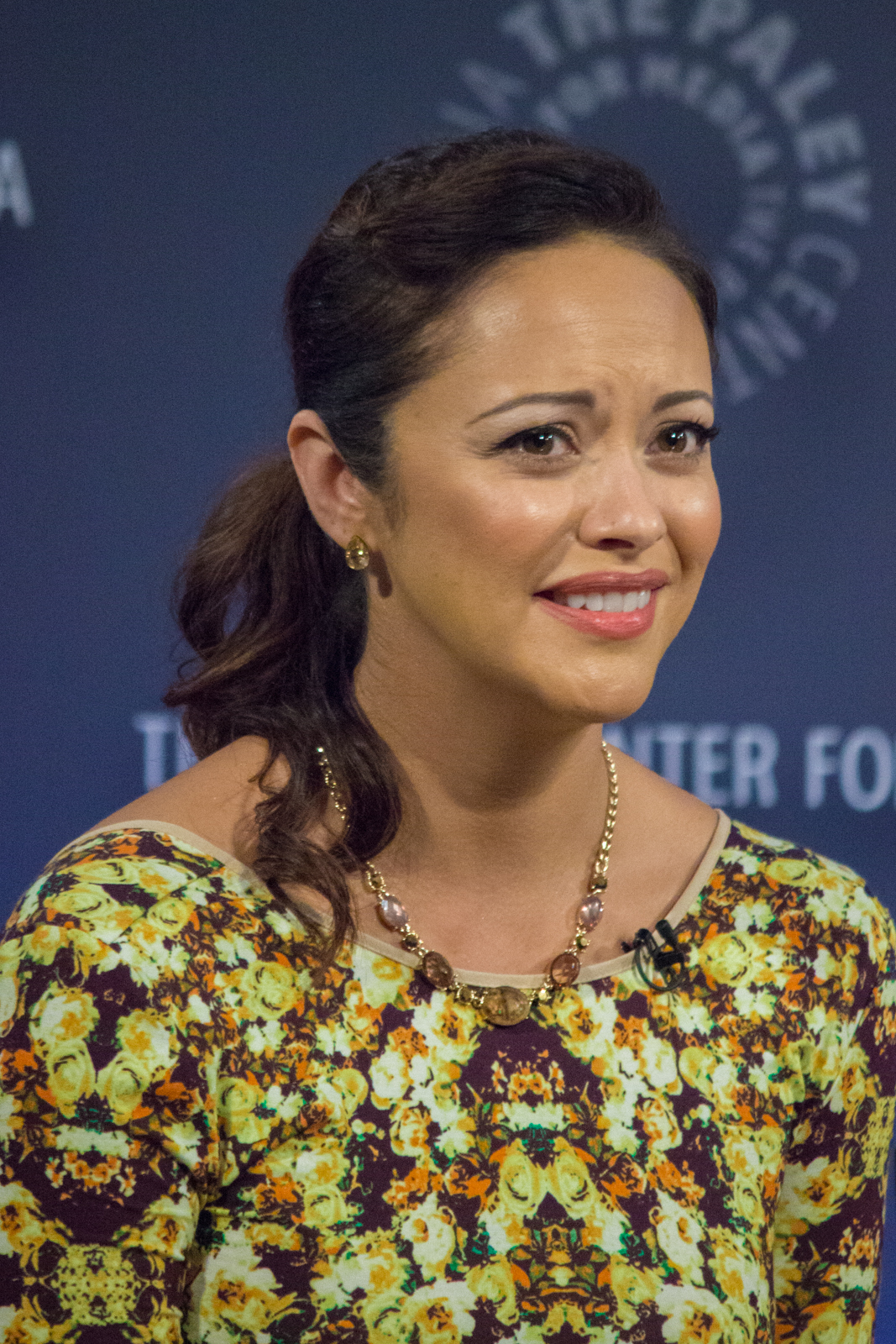
- Ramirez at the New York PaleyFest 2014
- Born: September 15, 1977 (age 49); Los Angeles, California, U.S.
- Occupation: Actress
- Years active: 1997–present
- Spouse: Nathan Lavezoli (m. 2002; div. 2011)
- Children: 1

Marisa Maguire Ramirez (born September 15, 1977) is an American actress, known for her work on television soap operas and for her role on the police procedural television drama series Blue Bloods and its spin-off Boston Blue as Detective Maria Baez.

== Early life ==
Ramirez graduated from All Saints Catholic School and then attended an all-girls school in Alhambra, California at Ramona Convent Secondary School. She grew up with her mother after her parents' divorce. She has described her background as Mexican, American Indian, and Irish. As a teenager, she attended a New Kids on the Block concert featuring her future Blue Bloods co-star and regular scene partner Donnie Wahlberg. Her career began at age 12 when she was brought to the attention of a major L.A. modeling agency, which led to an international modeling career. After modeling she transitioned into hosting and acting.

== Career ==
Ramirez is known to TV audiences from starring roles on four prime time and two notable daytime series. From 2013 to 2024, she played NYPD Detective Maria Baez in Blue Bloods and recurred as Officer Riley Dunn in Body of Proof. She started on Blue Bloods as a guest star in the third season before becoming a regular character from the fourth season to the 14th season. She currently has a recurring role as the same character on the Blue Bloods spin-off, Boston Blue.

In 2011, she was a series regular on Lifetime's Against the Wall, playing Detective Lina Flores. Despite respectable ratings, the series was not renewed for a second season. Immediately prior to landing that role, Ramirez starred as Melitta on Starz's Spartacus: Gods of the Arena, which was filmed in New Zealand.

After several guest appearances on Days of Our Lives and The Bold and the Beautiful, Ramirez finally got her big break in July 2000, when she was cast in the contract role of supermodel Gia Campbell on General Hospital. She left this role in December 2002 to star in the short-lived ABC drama, Miracles. During her time on GH, she was nominated for ALMA and NAACP Awards.

In April 2006 she joined the cast of The Young and the Restless as Jabot Cosmetics public relations consultant Carmen Mesta for five months. The character of Carmen was killed off. Ramirez briefly returned to the show in early 2007 as Carmen's cousin, Ines Vargas.

Shortly after, she moved to Colombia to film the Fox summer series Mental, opposite Chris Vance and Annabella Sciorra.

== Personal life ==
In interviews given soon after she joined General Hospital, she said her parents divorced when she was four and remarried when she was 19, soon after which her younger brother was born. Ramirez married Nathan Lavezoli on September 22, 2002, and divorced him in 2011. On January 22, 2016, Ramirez announced she was expecting her first child due in May. In May 2016, she gave birth to a daughter, whose father is a former crew member of Blue Bloods.

She told a Mexican news outlet that she wished she knew more about her Mexican-American heritage, and that on her father's side she also had Native-American ancestry and ties to Arizona.

== Filmography ==
=== Film ===
Year	Title	Role	Notes
2005	All Souls Day	Alicia	
2007	Itty Bitty Titty Committee	Ellen	
2009	Columbia Ave.	Charlie	Short
2010	The Funeral Planner	Sierra D'Asanti	Video
2010	Contract	Sandra	Short
2013	Prosecuting Casey Anthony	Rita Ashton	TV movie
2014	The Extendables	Maria	

=== Television ===
Year	Title	Role	Notes
1998	USA High	Liza	Episode: "Excess's Ex"
1999	Roswell	Vanessa	Episode: "Leaving Normal"
2000	Senseless Acts of Video	Herself/Host	Main host
2000–2002	General Hospital	Gia Campbell	Main role
2003	CSI: Miami	Susanna Medesto	Episode: "Hurricane Anthony"
2003	Miracles	Evelyn Santos	Main role
2004	Century City	Christina Dobbs	Episode: "Only You"
2004	Dr. Vegas	Eva Leon	Episode: "Pilot"
2006	Without a Trace	Sara	Episode: "Win Today"
2006–2007	The Young and the Restless	Carmen Mesta/Ines Vargas	Main role
2007	Shark	Monique	Episode: "Eye of the Beholder"
2008	Supernatural	Tammi	Episode: "Malleus Maleficarum"
2009	Mental	Dr. Chloe Artis	Main role
2009	Castle	Angelica Fink	Episode: "The Fifth Bullet"
2010	The Suite Life on Deck	Francesca	Episode: "Mother of the Groom"
2010	CSI: NY	Tania Santos	Episode: "The Formula"
2010	Miami Medical	Katherine	Episode: "Golden Hour"
2010	Past Life	Rosa Sanchez	Episode: "Gone Daddy Gone"
2010	Rizzoli & Isles	Marisa Rodriguez	Episode: "See One, Do One, Teach One"
2011	Spartacus: Gods of the Arena	Melitta	Main role
2011	Bones	Paula Ashwaldt	Episode: "The Killer in the Crosshairs"
2011	Against the Wall	Lina Flores	Main role
2012	The Mentalist	Sharon Vasquez	Episode: "War of the Roses"
2013	Celebrity Ghost Stories	Herself	Episode: "Marisa Ramirez/Jimmie Walker/Lisa Vidal/Kate Vernon"
2013	Body of Proof	Officer Riley Dunn	Recurring role
2013–2024	Blue Bloods	Det. Maria Baez	Recurring role; Season 3, Main role; Seasons 4-14
2025-	Boston Blue	Det. Maria Baez	Recurring role

=== Music Videos ===
Year	Song	Artist
1996	"Tease Me"	3T
1997	"As Long as You Love Me"	Backstreet Boys
1998	"Wherever You Go"	Voices of Theory
1999	"Give It To You"	Jordan Knight
2022	"Bring Back The Time"	New Kids on the Block featuring Salt-N-Pepa, Rick Astley & En Vogue
