= David Hull (actor) =

American actor and singer (born 1985)

- Born: August 5, 1984 (age 42); Ohio
- Education: University of Michigan
- Occupations: Actor; singer
- Years active: 2006–present
- Notable work: Crazy Ex-Girlfriend
- Spouse: Jenna Bunnell (m. 2020)
- Children: 2

David Hull (born August 5, 1984) is an American actor and singer, best known for playing White Josh in The CW comedy-drama series Crazy Ex-Girlfriend. Prior to his television and movie work, he performed in several stage plays and Broadway musicals.

== Early life ==
Hull was born and raised in Ohio just outside of Cincinnati. When he was younger he was interested in politics and was a member of the Junior Statesmen of America. At the age of sixteen, he discovered his love of music when he performed pop and country revues at local theme park Kings Island. He later attended the University of Michigan.

== Career ==
Hull had a number of Broadway credits before being cast in recurring role as White Josh on Crazy Ex-Girlfriend in 2015. In April 2017, it was announced that Hull had been promoted to series regular. He also had a recurring role as Travis Moore in the HBO comedy series Insecure. He played Logan on The Middle.

Hull appeared in the 2017 film The Dark Tapes. He also appeared in the 2018 film Benjamin directed by Bob Saget.

In 2022, Hull was announced as part of the cast of a film adaptation of several Chekhov plays to be directed by Martin McDonagh. The film will take elements of several of Chekhov's famous works, including The Cherry Orchard.

== Filmography ==
=== Film ===
Year	Title	Role	Notes
2014	Are You Joking?	Seth / Computer Face	
2016	The Dark Tapes	Josh (segment "Amanda's Revenge")	
2018	The Browsing Effect	Todd	
2019	The Sheriff of Topanga Canyon	Dave Wilder	TV movie
2019	Benjamin	Ronny	
2024	Rachel Bloom: Death, Let Me Do My Special	Death	Netflix Special

=== Television ===
Year	Title	Role	Notes
2010	The Big C	Greeter	Episode: "New Beginnings"
2012	Pzazz 101	David	Episode: "Understudies"
2013	Smash	Dancer	Episode: "The Dramaturg"
2014	Submissions Only	Opening Credit Actor	4 episodes
2014	Los Feliz, 90027	Austin James	
2015–2016	The Middle	Logan	3 episodes
2015–2019	Crazy Ex-Girlfriend	White Josh	34 episodes; Series Regular
2016	K.C. Undercover	Damon	Episode: "Virtual Insanity"
2016–2017	Insecure	Travis Moore	4 episodes
2017	TV for Monsters	Wolfman	4 episodes
2017	Wisdom of the Crowd	Karl	Episode: "Live Stream"
2018	Into the Dark	Alan	Episode: "The Body"
2021	Dear White People		Episode: "Volume 4: Chapter IX"

== Stage ==
Year	Title	Role	Notes
2006	Gypsy: A Musical Fable	Angie Farmboy	
2006	White Noise	Performer	
2007	High Button Shoes	Ensemble	Goodspeed Musicals
2007–08	Wicked	Ensemble / Understudy Boq	Broadway
2008–10	A Chorus Line	Mark Anthony	Broadway Revival
2010	Calvin Berger	Matt	George Street Playhouse
2010	Saved	Dean	Kansas City Repertory Theatre
2010	Wicked	Ensemble / Understudy Fiyero	Broadway
2011–12	How to Succeed in Business Without Really Trying	Toynbee / Ensemble / Understudy J. Pierrepont Finch	Broadway
2013	Really Really	Cooper	Off-Broadway
2013	The Book of Mormon	Ensemble / Understudy Elder McKinley	Broadway
2013	The Sound of Music Live!	Ensemble	NBC Live Televised Production
2014	Vanya and Sonia and Masha and Spike	Spike	Center Theatre Group
2023–24	Death, Let Me Do My Show	Death	Orpheum Theatre, NYC; Williamstown Theatre Festival; Lincoln Theatre, Washington, DC; Steppenwolf Theatre Company
