= Jérôme Charvet =

French actor

Jerome Charvet
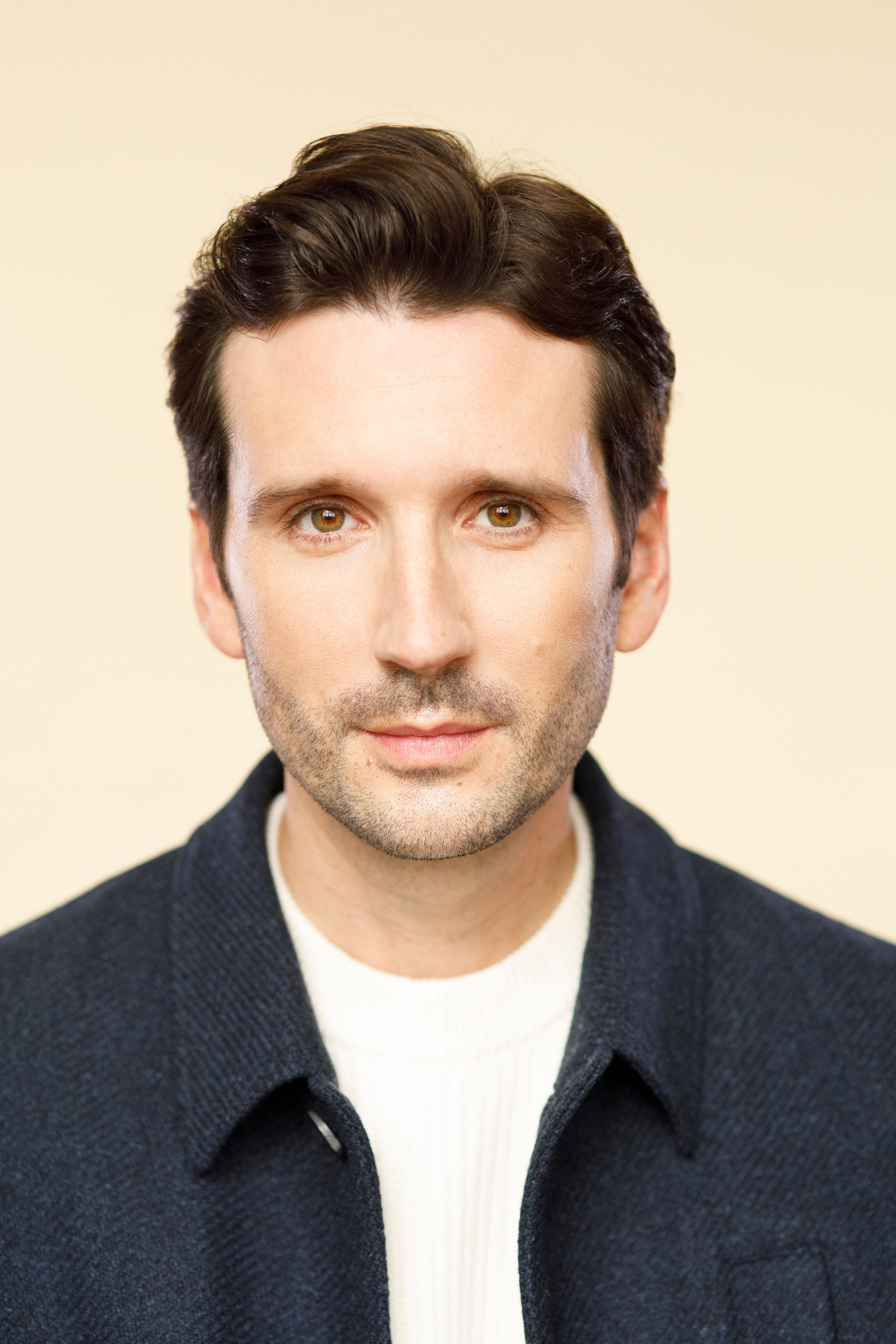
- Born: Paris, France
- Education: Stella Adler Studio of Acting; Lee Strasberg Theatre and Film Institute
- Occupation: Actor
- Years active: 2011–present

Jerome Charvet is a French actor who has appeared in international films and TV series since 2011.

== Biography ==
Jerome Charvet was born in Paris, France. His grandfather, Raymond Carré, is the three-star general in the French Army medical department who designed the entire training program for the first French astronauts, Jean-Loup Chrétien and Patrick Baudry. His father Christian Charvet is a sculptor.

After training at the Cours Florent acting school in Paris, he moved to New York City at the early age of 19. There he studied at the Lee Strasberg Theatre and Film Institute under the tutelage of Paul Calderon and Irma Sandrey, two members of The Actors Studio. He then got accepted into the Stella Adler Studio of Acting and studied with master teacher Ron Burrus, former assistant of Stella Adler. He started out his career on stage at the Manhattan Repertory Theatre and the Roy Arias Theatre.

After starring in the independent movie Falling Overnight shot in Los Angeles, his film career kicked off in Paris in 2013 with Amour et turbulences (Love Is in the Air), directed by Alexandre Castagnetti, with French actors Ludivine Sagnier and Nicolas Bedos. That same year, he also lent his voice to Follow Me, a campaign for the fashion brand Maje, where he plays a young man torn between three Parisian women. He then starred with Jean Reno in the TV series Jo, which was broadcast in 140 country. In 2014, he played opposite Gérard Depardieu in the movie United Passions directed by Frédéric Auburtin, also starring Tim Roth and Sam Neill. The movie recounts the story of the FIFA World Cup's creation and was in the Cannes Film Festival official selection.

In 2018, he portrayed a former ISIS hostage helping Susan Sarandon find her captive son in the movie Viper Club, starring Matt Bomer and Edie Falco. This feature film directed by Maryam Keshavarz and produced by YouTube Originals was selected at the Toronto Film Festival, where Jerome Charvet and the rest of the cast attended the premiere.

In 2019, he played one of the lead roles in Trick, by Patrick Lussier, starring Omar Epps and Jamie Kennedy.

In 2021, he stars in the second season of Hunters, produced by Amazon Studios.

== Filmography ==
Features

- 2011: Falling Overnight by Conrad Jackson
- 2013: Love Is in the Air by Alexandre Castagnetti
- 2014: United Passions by Frédéric Auburtin
- 2018: Viper Club by Maryam Keshavarz
- 2019: Trick by Patrick Lussier

Short films

- 2005: Teresa by Menguc Tanriseven
- 2011: Sand by Sophie Sherman
- 2013: La vie de rêve by David Tamayo
- 2019: Too Close by Emily O'Brien

Television

- 2013: Jo by René Balcer
- 2021: Newton's Cradle by Tamer Mohsen
- 2021: Hunters by David Weil and Jordan Peele
