= Jordan Rubin =

American film director (born 1972)

- Born: New York City, New York, U.S.
- Occupations: Film director, screenwriter, comedian
- Known for: Zombeavers; The Man Show

Jordan Rubin (born 1972) is an American independent film director. He directed the 2014 horror comedy film Zombeavers; which he also co-wrote with Jon and Al Kaplan.

== Early life ==
Jordan Rubin was born in New York City, where he was also raised. He earned a degree from New York University (NYU).

== Career ==
While Jordan was still studying at NYU, he began his career in stand-up comedy. He went on to write for television on comedy series such as The Man Show, The Late Late Show with Craig Kilborn, Crank Yankers, and Last Call with Carson Daly. He had his own half-hour Comedy Central special in 2008 and wrote the opening film for the 83rd Annual Academy Awards in 2011, in addition to many other television award shows. The American Jewish World Service commissioned a short film directed Judd Apatow and written by Jordan Rubin for the organization's 25th anniversary celebration.

Jordan's full feature directorial debut came in 2014 with the movie Zombeavers. A trailer for the film was released in February 2014 and went viral. The film had its world premiere on April 19, 2014, at the Tribecca Film Festival. The film was theatrically released in the United States in March 2015.
