= The Dark Tapes =

2016 American found footage horror film by Michael McQuown

- Theatrical Release Poster
- Directed by: Michael McQuown; Vincent J. Guastini (To Catch a Demon)
- Written by: Michael McQuown
- Produced by: Michael McQuown; Nicola Odeku; Amon Mahmud; Haldane Morris; Vincent J. Guastini
- Starring: Cortney Palm; Emilia Zoryan; Brittany Underwood; David Hull; Denise Faro; David Roy Banks
- Cinematography: Michael McQuown; Matt Shapira
- Edited by: Michael McQuown
- Production company: Thunder Road Incorporated
- Distributed by: Epic Pictures Group
- Release dates: April 22, 2016 (Phoenix Film Festival); March 17, 2017
- Running time: 98 minutes
- Country: United States
- Language: English
- Budget: $65,000

The Dark Tapes is a 2016 American found footage anthology horror film written and directed by Michael McQuown with Vincent J. Guastini directing the segment titled To Catch a Demon. The feature film consists of four segments To Catch A Demon, The Hunters & The Hunted, Cam Girls and Amanda's Revenge with a short opening sequence titled Wrap Around.

== Plot ==
The film is presented as an anthology of short horror films, built into a frame narrative which acts as its own short horror film. Each short film is linked together with the concept of found footage.

=== Wrap Around ===
Sam and Marie find blood and a mess in their small theatrical playhouse and blame their friend.

=== To Catch a Demon - Part A ===
- Directed by Vincent J. Guastini

Dr. Martin Callahan and his graduate student Nicole believe that night terrors are a result of the time dilation humans experience during REM sleep, which allows "transdimensional entities", or what some people call demons, to become visible. They attempt to perform an experiment to catch these entities with their hired cameraman Jason filming using a special high-speed camera, which can both record and play back slow-motion video.

=== The Hunters & the Hunted ===
David and Karen move into a new home and almost immediately begin to hear mysterious sounds coming from the roof and from around the house. They decide to record the events, which include seemingly unexplainable phenomena such as objects moving on their own. After David is attacked by an unseen force, leaving a visible handprint on his back, they call in paranormal investigators. The investigators, consisting of the lead investigator Susan, director Cameron, and cameraman Geoff, arrive and set up equipment and recording devices to collect information. They leave the house and let the cameras run overnight. As they get ready for bed, Karen, and then David, are attacked by an unseen force. The investigators review the recordings from the previous night and see a girl standing in a hallway behind Geoff.

David and Karen reveal that they had previously lost their daughter Ashen, and this prompts the investigators to hold a seance to call out to their daughter. Ashen seemingly confirms her presence in the house. Distraught, Karen leaves the scene. Susan deduces that Ashen is stuck in this dimension in the downstairs floor of the house, and another spirit is barring her from leaving. She asks Cameron to take infrared scans of all the rooms and takes David and Geoff downstairs.

Left alone, Cameron continues taking scans of the rooms while also recording his activities with an infrared camera. Hearing a sound, he goes downstairs and finds both Susan and Geoff dead in a bathroom. He sees Ashen and runs upstairs to the living room, where he is struck down.

Later, it is revealed that David and Karen are serial murderers who routinely kill such paranormal investigators, and that the whole setup was a sham. Ashen enters the living room, and assisted by David, stabs the unconscious Cameron in the back for her 'first kill.' The camera records Cameron succumbing to his death.

=== To Catch a Demon - Part B ===
The researchers' first attempt catches fleeting images of an entity. During their second attempt they apply a small dose of radiation on the room, and the same entity attacks Martin and sticks tentacles down his throat, using him to communicate to Nicole and Jason. Nicole and Jason lose consciousness as they attempt to flee.

=== Cam Girls ===
Caitlin, a cam girl in a lesbian relationship, video chats with her friend telling him about unexplained blackouts after going out with her girlfriend Sindy. Caitlin says she did things she could not explain; things she would never do sober. Her friend advises her to drink less, and everything should be fine. Sindy returns home and the two prepare for a special cam session where one member from a group chat will receive a free private show. Sindy asks Caitlin if she can convince her selection to cut himself, just a little bit. Sindy selects Gerry, a mild-mannered overweight man. Sindy walks off screen and Caitlin begins flirting with Gerry. She asks him to give her a video tour of his house. As he gives Caitlin the tour, unexplained flashes of gore are seen on the video screens. Suddenly, Caitlin requests that Gerry cut his hand to satisfy a fetish of hers, and he does. After that, she asks Gerry to slit his throat. Gerry, as if bound by an external force, cuts his throat while muttering that he does not want to die.

The scene then opens to Sindy and Cailtin standing over Gerry's body. It is revealed that they are both vampires. Cailtin offers the body to Sindy, who says that she is trapped within her body and has remained unsatisfied until now. The camera cuts to black as they both start feasting on Gerry's body.

=== To Catch a Demon - Part C ===
Nicole and Jason regain consciousness and see Martin unharmed. Martin informs them they are trapped in a different time dilation due to the experiment, and that the area may have different flows of time, keeping them trapped there in a time dilation bubble where the outside world seems frozen and they are invisible to others, just like the entities usually are. Martin thinks he can reverse the time dilation. Just as he is about to do so, Jason attempts to grab his high-speed camera and is trapped on the periphery of the bubble, dividing his body in halves between two dimensions. He spouts blood from his mouth and dies shortly after.

=== Amanda's Revenge ===
Amanda talks directly to the camera about being abducted and kidnapped for four months and states her intention of exacting revenge on her captors. Four months earlier, during a party, Amanda's friend Josh tells Ryan, Amanda's childhood best friend, that he saw two men carry an unconscious Amanda into a room. Ryan and Josh break into the room, subdue the molesters, and due to quick action appear to have prevented a rape from occurring. However, the next morning Amanda walks out in a trance suggesting she was violated in unimaginable ways. Suddenly the entire house quakes and Amanda sleepwalks back to her room, only to awaken with no memory of the incident. Even stranger, Ryan and Josh realize that there was no reported earthquake and everything seems fine outside.

A month later Amanda calls her friends over to watch her sleep at night. Something is wrong with Amanda and she's getting worse. However, instead of staying awake, everyone mysteriously passes out and the camera glitches out. In the morning, the friends are awoken by Amanda's screams. They rush to her, and she says that her plan did not work.

Later, Amanda confides in Ryan, who is her childhood best friend, that something unexplainable has been happening in her life. She shows him that she can perform telekinesis, which both intrigues and worries Ryan.

A few days later, Amanda calls Ryan to a secluded cabin in the woods. She reveals that she feels like some entity is transporting her to a different dimension every night, and wishes to neutralize it. She says that the entities neutralize anything electronic, including cameras. So she plans on recording them with a vintage wind-up camera and a wax recorder. She has also set up various traps around the cabin to hurt the entity.

At night, an entity visits Amanda and raises her body up. However, one of the traps triggers and kills it.

A month later, with everything seemingly normal, Amanda and Ryan go to sleep keeping their video call on. Suddenly Ryan's room starts to shake violently.

=== To Catch a Demon - Part D ===
With Jason dead, Martin and Nicole plan to perform the experiment one more time, now with a higher dose of radiation. The entity materializes and Martin confronts it. Seeing Nicole hesitant, Martin explains to her that he is already dead in the other dimension because of the entity. Nicole promptly applies the radiation dose and falls unconscious.

A while later, she wakes up alone in the theater. She picks up the camera and goes outside, to find Sam and Marie seemingly frozen. She realizes that she has expanded the time dilation bubble and leaves the scene. In normal time, Sam and Marie enter the theater.

== Cast ==
- David Roy Banks as Sam
- Sara Areyano (as Sara Castro) as Marie
- David Rountree as Martin Callahan
- Cortney Palm as Nicole
- Matt Magnusson as Jason
- Shawn Lockie as Karen
- Stephen Zimpel as David
- Jo Galloway as Susan
- Clint Keepin as Cameron
- Jonthan Biver as Geoff
- Brittany Fisheli as Ashen
- Emilia Zoryan as Caitlin
- Anna Rose Moore as Sindy
- Aral Gibble as Gerry
- Brittany Underwood as Amanda Courtney
- Jake O'Connor as Ryan
- David Hull as Josh

== Release ==
The film premiered on April 22, 2016 at The Phoenix Film Festival and was released on March 17, 2017 in the United States. It played in multiple festivals from 2016 to February 2017, and was picked up for US distribution by Epic Pictures Group. The film was released theatrically on April 17, 2017 in select theaters, and is available internationally on all VOD platforms as of April 18, 2017. As of April 2020, it is also available for free on Amazon Prime in the United States and United Kingdom, as well as Tubi, Vudu, Crackle, Xumo, Fandango Now and Hoopla.

== Reception ==
The Dark Tapes received mostly positive reviews. It holds an 90% on Rotten Tomatoes based on 10 reviews. Bradley Gibson of Film Threat gave the film an 8 out of 10 saying "this is effective, mysterious, and vibey millennial horror". Ryan Morris of Film Inquiry said the film was "fun, scary and consistently tense". Steve Barton of Dread Central gave the film a positive review saying "ends up doing more right than it does wrong".
