= Lucy Nettie Fletcher =

British-born American nurse

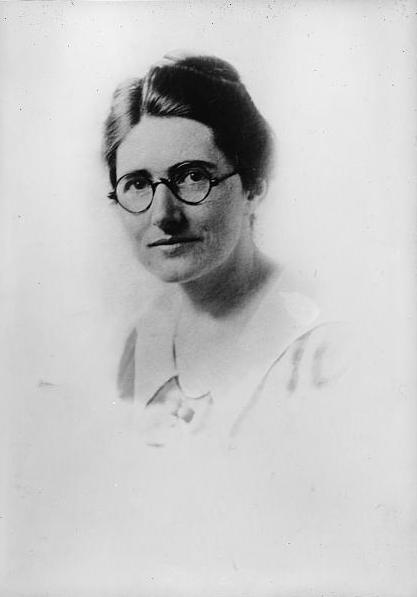
Lucy N. Fletcher

Lucy Nettie Fletcher (February 18, 1886 – May 6, 1918) was a British-born American nurse who died while on active duty in France during World War I.

== Biography ==
Fletcher was born in Grouville, Isle of Jersey, England, February 18, 1886. She was the daughter of Charles George Ellis and Nettie Murdock (Binet) Fletcher, and the granddaughter of Rev. William and Lucy Antoinette (Murdock) Binet. Fletcher's father and grandfather were English, but on her mother's side, she was descended from Massachusetts families, Mason, Dedham, and Robert Murdock, who emigrated to Roxbury, Massachusetts, in 1692. She had a brother, Vivian F. Fletcher, and three sisters.

In 1902, she came to Concord, New Hampshire, to make her home with her aunts, the Misses Eliza M., Alice L., and Maude B. Binet.

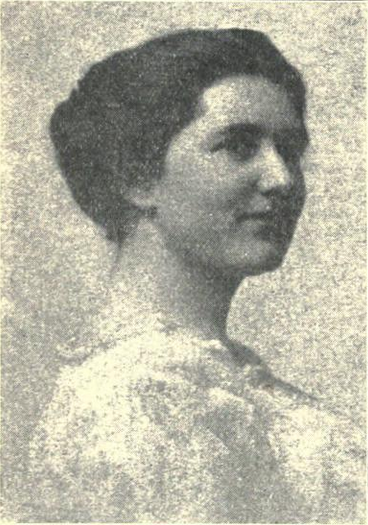
Lucy Nettie Fletcher

She was educated at St. Mary's School (now White Mountain School) one year; high school, 1902; and graduated from Radcliffe College, A.B., 1910. Fletcher began training as a secretary in the Associated Charities of Boston. She graduated from the nursing school at Massachusetts General Hospital, February 1916, and became night supervisor in that hospital. She was a member of the Boston Woman's College Club, St. Mary's Alumnae Association, and Radcliffe Alumnae Association. In religion, she was Episcopalian.

In June 1917, she left for France with the U.S. Army Base Hospital, No. 6, to which she belonged, joining the front in July of that year. She became head nurse in one of the medical wards.

== Death and legacy ==
Fletcher contracted meningitis and died May 6, 1918. She was buried with full military honors in the first grave in the officers' cemetery. She was the first Red Cross nurse in General Pershing's army to die in the performance of duty. Fletcher's name, along with that of two other Radcliffe alumni, is inscribed on a tablet at Memorial Church of Harvard University.
