= Hoax (film) =

- Directed by: Matt Allen
- Written by: Matt Allen; Scott Park
- Produced by: Matt Allen; Mitch Dickman; Michael Haskins
- Starring: Cheryl Texiera; Ben Browder; Hutch Dano; Shoshana Bush; Max Decker; Brian Thompson; Brian Landis Folkins; Schuyler Denham; Anthony Ray Parker
- Music by: Alan Howarth
- Production company: Rum River Productions
- Distributed by: Dread Central Presents
- Release date: 20 August 2019
- Running time: 96 minutes
- Country: United States
- Language: English

Hoax [aka Bigfoot] is a 2019 American horror film directed by Matt Allen, starring Cheryl Texiera, Ben Browder and Hutch Dano.

== Plot ==
Six college students are attacked by an unknown creature while camping in the wilderness, five being killed while one, Alex Barnes, goes missing. The incident is dubbed the “Mountaineering Massacre”.

Some time later, struggling film producer Rick Paxton approaches a former employer, Roger Brannan, and pitches to him an idea for a hit show that spins the Massacre as a Bigfoot attack rather than what the police suspect is a bear attack. Brannan agrees, so long as Paxton can provide him with proof first.

Paxton gathers a team together to go into the woods with him and seek evidence of Bigfoot’s presence. He brings with him his assistant Danny, his cameraman Justin, social media vlogger Brigette, primate specialist Dr. Ellen, helicopter pilot Jonesy and his bulldog Ike, Sasquatch expert Peter, security John Singer, and the missing Alex’s father, Cooper, looking for answers. They first set up a trail cam with bait, as per Peter’s instruction, adding a pheromone to attract animals to it.

Initial attempts fail, so Peter goes to check on the camera, and is killed by an unseen creature. While looking for Peter, they find a cave with intestines hanging from the ceiling, and spot a hairy shape on the camera, but make no other progress. Growing irritated by the lack of progress— and by Brigette’s complaining— Paxton secretly adds pheromones to her coat, which gets her attacked by a creature and causes her to break her ankle. Ellen and Singer want to get her to a hospital, but Paxton initially refuses due to the idea of Search & Rescue scaring Bigfoot away.

Jonesy and Ike, meanwhile, are both attacked and killed at the helicopter, Ike being viciously torn open while Jonesy’s head is bashed in. At the camp, the creature destroys Paxton’s equipment and leaves a bloody paw print on the terrified Brigette. Meanwhile Paxton, Ellen, and Cooper find a large footprint in the ground which can only belong to Bigfoot. When Brigette continues to panic afterward, Paxton agrees to have Jonesy fly her to the hospital since he now needs the SAT Phone from the helicopter. Danny drives to the landing site on an ATV and finds the SAT Phone destroyed, along with Jonesy’s body. While driving the ATV back to camp, he spots the creature nearby and panics before crashing into a log and concussing himself.

Danny returns to camp injured and is treated by Ellen, while Singer takes charge from Paxton and declares that they’ll leave the next day as long as they can survive the night. That night, however, Cooper, Singer and Justin are drawn away from the camp while tracking the creature, only for Singer to be ambushed and killed. Cooper and Justin flee to camp and tell the others what happened, and as the creature trashes the camp and kills Danny, Paxton panics, grabbing a pistol and his bag, which he has unknowingly covered in the pheromones. Brigette has a meltdown and threatens to end Paxton’s career, so he fatally shoots her, also shooting Cooper when he tries to intervene. He then flees into the woods.

Ellen and Justin try to help the injured Cooper away from the camp, and they find a cabin with cars parked outside. Justin’s foot is caught in a bear trap so Ellen is forced to run to the cabin for help. An older woman named Charlotte opens the door and lets her inside before knocking her unconscious. When Ellen wakes, she finds herself and Cooper tied to chairs while Charlotte and her two insane sons, Luc and Gage, look on. It is revealed that the brothers have been posing as monsters to direct suspicion away from themselves, as they are a family of cannibalistic serial killers. Luc drags Justin into the cabin and clubs him to death before bringing him into a shed to remove his innards.

As she slowly flays Cooper alive, Charlotte reveals that Ellen is to be made Gage’s wife. Gage plays music from a record player while he dances with a long-dead corpse, which Cooper recognizes as his missing daughter Alex. As he struggles to reach a nearby knife out of anguish, Gage grabs it and uses it to kill Cooper. Ellen manages to get her hands free and throws scalding hot water onto Charlotte before knocking her unconscious with a frying pan. She then uses the frying pan to beat Gage to death, before attempting to flee in one of the cars parked outside, which belong to the family’s victims. While driving, she runs down Luc, but crashes into a tree, activating a 911 call built into the car. As the dispatcher agrees to send someone to her location, Charlotte appears and attacks Ellen through the open window.

Meanwhile in the woods, Paxton, having used up all of his ammo, tries to run but comes face-to-face with the real Bigfoot, who begins to attack him.

== Cast ==
- Cheryl Texiera as Dr. Ellen Freese
- Ben Browder as Rick Paxton
- Hutch Dano as Justin Johnson
- Brian Thompson as John Singer
- Brian Landis Folkins as Danny Kent
- Shoshana Bush as Brigette Powers
- Max Decker as Cooper Barnes
- Schuyler Denham as Peter Moore
- Anthony Ray Parker as Jonesy
- Adrienne Barbeau as Wilma
- Karen Slack as Charlotte Beauchamp
- Christopher Soren Kelly as Gage Beauchamp
- Shawn Rickel as Luc Beauchamp
- Matt Riedy as Roger Brannan

== Release ==
The film was released on Google Play, iTunes, Amazon Prime Video, Vudu, and on Blu-ray on 20 August 2019.

== Reception ==
The film received a positive review in PopHorror. Adrian Halen of HorrorNews.net wrote the film a mixed review, praising the film's third act. Film critic Kim Newman wrote a negative review of the film, writing that it "isn’t as memorable a visit to this much-tramped patch of the woods as, say, Abominable, Exists or Willow Creek", while praising the performances.

Ian Sedensky of Culture Crypt gave the film a score of 45 out of 100. Bryan Yentz of Rue Morgue wrote the film a negative review, writing that it "attempts some respectable misdirection, but falters in its lusterless execution."
