= Silence! The Musical =

Musical by Jon and Al Kaplan

- Original Off-Broadway poster
- Music: Jon Kaplan; Al Kaplan
- Lyrics: Jon Kaplan; Al Kaplan
- Book: Hunter Bell
- Basis: Silence! The Musical by Jon Kaplan; Al Kaplan; The Silence of the Lambs by Ted Tally; The Silence of the Lambs by Thomas Harris
- Productions: 2005 Off-Broadway; 2009 London Fringe; 2011 Off-Broadway; 2012 Los Angeles; 2016 Chicago; 2017 San Francisco
- Awards: 2005 New York Fringe Festival Outstanding Musical Award; 2011 Time Magazine's Top 10 Plays and Musicals; 2012 Off Broadway Alliance Award - Best Musical; 2012 Los Angeles Drama Critics Circle - Score, Lead Performance, Choreography

Silence! The Musical is a 2005 musical created by Jon Kaplan and Al Kaplan as a parody of the 1991 Academy Award-winning film The Silence of the Lambs, which is in turn based on 1988 novel of the same name by Thomas Harris. The musical is itself based on a parody screenplay of the same name written by Jon Kaplan and Al Kaplan.

== Characters ==
- Clarice Starling (alto) – A student at the FBI Academy. She hopes to work at the Behavioral Science Unit, tracking down serial killers and ultimately apprehending them. Her mentor, Jack Crawford, sends her to interview Dr. Hannibal Lecter. The character is commonly portrayed as having a lisp.
- Dr. Hannibal Lecter (bari-tenor) – A brilliant psychiatrist and cannibalistic serial killer who helps Clarice out in her investigation and eventually escapes prison in a bloody massacre.
- Jame Gumb/Buffalo Bill (baritone) – Serial killer and main antagonist of the plot. He murders overweight women so he can remove their skin and fashion a "woman suit" for himself; he believes himself to be transsexual but is too disturbed to qualify for sex reassignment surgery.
- Catherine Baker Martin (soprano) – Daughter of Senator Ruth Martin, kidnapped and imprisoned by "Buffalo Bill".
- Jack Crawford (bass-baritone) – The Agent-in-Charge of the Behavioral Science Unit of the FBI in Quantico, Virginia.
- Ardelia Mapp (mezzo-soprano) – Roommate of Clarice Starling and also a student at the FBI Academy who helps her out in the investigation.
- Dr. Frederick Chilton (high baritone) – The pompous, incompetent director of the Chesapeake State Hospital for the Criminally Insane and later Baltimore Hospital for the Criminally Insane. There, he is the jailer of Hannibal Lecter.
- Papa Starling (baritone) – Clarice's deceased father who appears to her in visions to encourage her in carrying out the investigation. A Virginia sheriff who was killed during a robbery.
- Senator Ruth Martin (soprano) – National senator and mother of Catherine, who pleads for Buffalo Bill to release her daughter on national television and arranges for Lecter to be transferred to a lighter security prison in Baltimore in exchange for information on the killer.

== Musical numbers ==
1. "Silence!" – The Lambs
2. "Thish Ish It" – Clarice
3. "The Right Guide" – Chilton and FBI Agents
4. "If I Could Smell Her Cunt" – Lecter
5. "Papa Shtarling" – Papa Starling and Clarice
6. "It's Agent Shtarling" – Clarice and FBI Agents
7. "Are You About a Size 14?" – Bill, Catherine and Ensemble
8. "My Daughter Is Catherine" – Senator Martin
9. "Quid Pro Quo" – Lecter and Clarice
10. "I'd Fuck Me" – Bill and Ensemble
11. "It's Me!" – Lecter and Ensemble
12. "Catherine Dies Today" – Ardelia, Clarice, Bill and Ensemble
13. "Papa Shtarling" (reprise) – Papa Starling and Clarice
14. "Put the Fucking Lotion in the Basket" – Bill and Catherine
15. "We're Goin' In!" – Crawford, FBI Agents, Clarice and Bill
16. "In the Dark with a Maniac" – Clarice, Bill, Catherine and Ensemble
17. "I'd Fuck Me" (reprise) – Bill
18. "Silence!" (reprise) – The Lambs

== Development ==
The project began in 2003 as an internet musical made up of nine songs that retold the entire story. The audio tracks became popular to the extent that a live show was conceived and staged. Six additional songs were written by the Kaplans, and the book was written by Hunter Bell, based on the original screenplay Silence! The Musical, also by the Kaplans.

== Productions ==
The stage musical premiered in the Lucille Lortel Theatre, New York, on August 12, 2005 as part of the New York International Fringe Festival, and showed until August 28, 2005. The production was directed by Christopher Gattelli.

Silence! had its European premiere in London on October 19, 2009, showing for two weeks at the Barons Court Theatre. The run was directed by David Phipps-Davis. Christopher Gattelli's production subsequently transferred to the Above The Stag Theatre, running from January 19 - February 28, 2010. Directed and choreographed by Gattelli, this production featured new material written for its London outing.

An off-Broadway mounting of the show opened June 24 – September 26, 2011 at Theatre 80, directed and choreographed by Christopher Gattelli. It transferred to the 9th Space Theatre at PS 122 on October 24, 2011.

The musical reopened on January 18, 2013 at the Elektra Theatre, in New York City's Times Square, through August 13.

Jobsite Theater in Tampa, FL, presented the southeastern US premiere of the show in the Jaeb Theater at the Straz Center for the Performing Arts Oct 14 – November 15, 2015.

Corn Productions presented the Chicago premiere at the Cornservatory July 8 – August 13, 2016.

Cloud 9 Theatricals, in association with Lang Entertainment Group and Ray of Light Theater presented the San Francisco premiere at the Victoria Theater January 26 – April 1, 2017.

Down Stage Right Theatre Productions, in association with the Neanderthal Arts Festival, presented the Western Canada premiere on July 25 - August 3, 2019.

The musical, directed and choreographed by Christopher Gattelli, will run at the Turbine Theatre in September 2024.

== Casts ==
The original New York cast featured:

- Brent Barrett as Hannibal Lecter
- Jenn Harris as Clarice Starling
- Stephen Bienskie as Jame Gumb / Buffalo Bill
- Deidre Goodwin as Ardelia Mapp
- Jeff Hiller
- Howard Kaye as Papa Starling
- Lucia Spina as Senator Martin / Catherine Martin
- Callan Bergmann as Jack Crawford
- Harry Bouvy as Dr. Frederick Chilton
- Ashlee Dupré

Silence! played 67 performances at the Hayworth Theatre in Los Angeles in late 2012. The show was produced by Danna Hyams and Oskar Eiriksson. The Production Stage Manager was Ritchard Druther.

The original Los Angeles cast (2012) featured:

- Davis Gaines as Hannibal Lecter
- Christine Lakin as Clarice Starling
- Stephen Bienskie and Stephen Van Dorn as Buffalo Bill
- Latoya London as Ardelia Mapp
- Andy Umberger as Papa Starling
- Kathy Deitch as Senator Martin / Catherine Martin
- Jeff Hiller
- Alaine Kashian
- Andrew Pirozzi
- Melissa Sandvig
- Jeff Skowron
- Jesse Merlin
- Karl Warden

The original London cast (2010) featured:

- Miles Western as Hannibal Lecter
- Tory Ross as Clarice Starling
- Fabian Hartwell as Buffalo Bill
- Shakella Dedi as Ardelia Mapp
- Tim MacArthur as Papa Starling
- Catherine Millsom as Senator Martin / Catherine Martin
- Leon Kay
- Christopher David Mitchell
- Phil Price
- Alex Browne
- Pippa Holliday

== Awards ==
- 2005: Outstanding Musical, New York International Fringe Festival
- 2011: Time Magazine's Top 10 Plays and Musicals 2011
- 2012: Off Broadway Alliance Award for Best New Musical
- 2012: Los Angeles Drama Critics Circle Award - Musical Score, Lead Performance, Choreography

== Cast recording ==
A cast album featuring the original nine tracks was made available "For fun only. Not for sale."
