= Disappearance (2019 film) =

- Directed by: Matt Shapira
- Written by: Mike Wollaeger; Matt Shapira; Hutch Dano
- Produced by: Lauren Bates; Hutch Dano; Matt Shapira; Chadwick Struck
- Starring: Reggie Lee; Matthew Marsden; Cortney Palm; Hutch Dano; Jemma Dallender; Chloe Catherine
- Cinematography: Eitan Almagor
- Edited by: Sam Bauer
- Music by: Gerard Bauer
- Distributed by: Gravitas Ventures and 123 Go Films
- Release date: June 18, 2019
- Running time: 79 minutes
- Country: United States
- Language: English

Disappearance is a 2019 American thriller film directed by Matt Shapira and starring Reggie Lee, Matthew Marsden, Cortney Palm and Hutch Dano. The trailer released by Gravitas Ventures.

== Plot ==
After the disappearance of mystery author George Belanger from his sailboat, Detective Park must sort through stories of George's mistress, George's wife, and the boat captain, to ascertain if there was foul play, or if George simply left for greener pastures.

== Cast ==
- Reggie Lee as Detective Park
- Matthew Marsden as George Belanger
- Cortney Palm as Isabelle Belanger
- Hutch Dano as Blake
- Jemma Dallender as Cecile
- Chloe Catherine Kim as Samantha
- Brian Thompson as Captain Cody
- Guy Wilson as Detective Bailey
