= Denise Faro =

Italian singer and actress

- Born: Denise Faro; Rome, Italy
- Genres: Pop, Pop Rock
- Occupations: Singer; actress; producer
- Instrument: Vocals
- Years active: 2002–present
- Label: independent
- Website: denisefaro.com

Denise Faro is an Italian singer and actress. Faro rose to prominence playing Juliet in Riccardo Cocciante’s Juliet and Romeo Opera, followed by the role of Gabriella Montez in the Italian adaptation of High School Musical.

== Career ==
Faro has also appeared in various films and television series for the main Italian channels Mediaset and RAI.

She had her feature film debut in the 2007 film Come tu mi Vuoi. She was a contestant on the first season of The Voice of Italy.

She had mainstream success in 2012 after winning the 53rd International singing competition of Viña del Mar with her original song "Grazie a te" which entered "Los 40 principales" at number 23.

Faro has also played the double role of Sol And Belen in the international musical Patito Feo performing more than 300 shows around Europe, and the role of Beatriz in The Postman in 2014, making her debut in USA.

She has appeared in American TV series such as Soccer and Drinks (2016) and films such as The Dark Tapes and Papa (2018).

The single she released in 2017 "Nunca Fue Verdad" entered the HTV Hot Ranking and became the soundtrack of the main Chilevisión TV series Lo que callamos las mujeres. At the end of the same year she released one more single, in a doble version Italian and Spanish.

In 2019 she released a new single in a doble version "Intrappolata" (Italian), "Atrapada" (Spanish), plus an English collaboration with the Dj Luis Rodriguez "Breaking Free". In the same year, she performed at the San Siro stadium for opening Vasco Rossi.

=== Theatre ===
- Un sogno da vivere (2002)
- Audizione Musical (2003)
- il Vicolo (2004)
- Il prezzo del coraggio (2005)
- Charly altro che beautiful! (2006)
- Giulietta e Romeo – director: Riccardo Cocciante and Pasquale Panella (2007/2008) – role : Julieta
- High School Musical - Lo spettacolo, production:Disney (2008/2009) – rolel: Gabriella Montez.
- Il mondo di Patty, il musical più bello, director: Toto Vivinetto (2009/2010) – role: Sol y Belen.
- Patito Feo el musical más lindo. director Toto Vivinetto (2010) production: televisa. – role: Sol y Belen.'
- The Postman . American production.(2014). – Role: Beatrice.

=== Cinema ===
- Come tu mi vuoi, director Volfango De Biasi (2007)
- il mondo di patty, la festa di Patty, production televisa (2010)
- The Dark Tapes (2017)
- Papa, director Emilio Roso (2018)

=== Television ===
- Un medico in famiglia 4 – TV series (2004)
- I raccomandati (2006), with Paolo Vallesi -role: cantante.
- TIM – Spot (2005/2006)
- Sanremo (2008) – special guest
- la academia bicentenario (2010) – Mexico
- Benvenuti a tavola - Nord vs Sud (2012) – TV Serie Mediaset Taodue
- Soccer and Drinks (2017) – TV series

=== Músic ===
- Spazio aperto (2002) – National song competition – first place
- 39º Benidorm international song festival (2006)
- LIII Festival de Viña del Mar (2012) – first Place

=== Discography ===
- «I just wanna be with you» (2009) – Single.
- «Una simple sonrisa» (2010) – del álbum Patito feo, el musical más lindo CD/DVD.
- «Grazie a te» (2012) – Single.
- «Gracias a ti» (2012) – Single.
- «Fuiste tu» (2013) – Single.
- «Grattacielo – Cover in italiano del brano Skyscraper» (2013) – Single.
- «Pensándolo Bien» (2015) – Single.
- «Nunca Fue Verdad» (2016) – Single.
- «Lentamente – Cover in italiano del brano Despacito» (2017) – Single.
- «Lucha Siempre Por Mas» (2017) – Single.
- «Nunca Fue Verdad (Remix Feat. Luis Rodriguez» (2017) – Single.
- «#NonMeNeFregaNiente» (2017) – Single.
- «#NoMeImportaNada» (2017) – Single.
- «No Me Digas Nada» (2018) – Single.
- «Breaking Free (di Luis Rodriguez)» (2019) – Single.
- «Intrappolata» (2019) – Single
- «Atrapada» (2019) – Single
