= Deidre Goodwin =

American actress (born 1969)

Deidre Goodwin (born September 15, 1969, Oklahoma City, Oklahoma) is an American actress known for such films and television series as Chicago, Half Nelson, Life on Mars, The Bourne Legacy and Across the Universe.

== Career ==
A stage and musical theatre actress who has appeared in such Broadway productions as A Chorus Line and Silence! The Musical, as well as productions of Chicago, Nine, The Boys From Syracuse, and The Rocky Horror Show, she is a graduate of Southwest Missouri State University. She serves on the faculty of the New York Film Academy. She is also the imaging voice for WCBS and KYW.

== Theatre ==
In 2006, Goodwin appeared as Sheila Bryant in the Broadway revival of A Chorus Line.

== Filmography ==
=== Film ===
Year	Title	Role	Notes
2002	Chicago	June	
2005	Lavender: An Adaptation	Josephine Mitchell	Short
2006	Half Nelson	Tina	
2007	Across the Universe	Hooker	
2008	Meet Dave	A Chorus Line Dancer	
2009	It's Complicated	Fertility Nurse	
2010	Fair Game	Journalist #2	
2010	Rabbit Hole	Reema	
2010	Love & Other Drugs	Viagra Nurse #1	
2012	The Bourne Legacy	Candent Spokesperson	
2013	Chasing Taste	Linden Perry	
2014	Are You Joking?	Kelly	
2014	Top Five	Angry Stripper	
2015	I Am Michael	Cheryl	
2015	Magic Mike XXL	Tarzan's Girl	
2016	Better Off Single	Presidential Debate Moderator	
2017	Hard	Gwen	Short
2018	Breaking Brooklyn	Lisa	
2018	Ocean's 8	Prison Guard	
2018	The First Purge	Psychologist #3	
2019	Diamond Soles	Audition Choreographer	

=== Television ===
Year	Title	Role	Notes
2006	Conviction	Detective in Video	Episode: "Downhill"
2008	30 Rock	Deborah	Episode: "MILF Island"
2008–09	Life on Mars	Nurse	Recurring cast
2008–09	The Battery's Down	LaLa DeShaun	Guest: season 1, recurring cast: season 2
2009	Law & Order: Special Victims Unit	Nanny	Episode: "Selfish"
2009	Rescue Me	Hostess	Episode: "Zippo"
2010	Nurse Jackie	Brooke	Episode: "Twitter"
2010	Rubicon	Administrator	Episode: "Caught in the Suck"
2011	Blue Bloods	Maureen	Episode: "Critical Condition"
2014	Believe	Doctor Tracy Elliot	Episode: "Pilot"
2015	Broad City	Maureen	Episode: "Coat Check"
2016	Elementary	Attorney	Episode: "To Catch a Predator Predator"
2016	Search Party	Barb	Episode: "The Return of the Forgotten Phantom"
2017	New York Is Dead	Jackie	Episode: "Episode #1.3"
2017–18	Madam Secretary	Herself	Episode: "The Seventh Floor" & "My Funny Valentine"
2018	Pose	Wanda Green	Episode: "Pilot"
2018	Chicago Med	Jeanette Phillips	Episode: "Lesser of Two Evils"
2019	The Good Fight	Melissa Long	Episode: "The One Where Diane Joins the Resistance"
2019	Divorce	Mimi	Recurring cast: season 3
2019	Indoor Boys	Candice	Episode: "Book Club"
2020	Awkwafina Is Nora from Queens	Detective Dornetto	Episode: "Paperwork"
2022	The Blacklist	Emily Wright	Episode: "Eva Mason (No. 181)"
