= The Extendables =

- Directed by: Brian Thompson
- Written by: Brian Thompson
- Produced by: Sharon Braun; Brian Thompson
- Starring: Brian Thompson; Marisa Ramirez; Ian Patrick Williams; Gary Graham
- Cinematography: Reinhart Peschke
- Edited by: Peter Bayer; Sherwood Jones
- Music by: Alan Derian
- Production company: Big Guy Films
- Release date: August 3, 2014
- Running time: 85 minutes
- Country: United States
- Language: English

The Extendables (also known as Action Hero) is a 2014 American parody film created by and starring Brian Thompson. The film is a parody of The Expendables and similar action movies. Thompson said it contained actual events he had witnessed. The film was released on iTunes.

== Plot ==
The film begins with Brian Thompson's explanation that the movie is his answer to the question: "What's it like to work with Sylvester Stallone, Arnold Schwarzenegger, Steven Seagal or Jean-Claude Van Damme?" By combining the distinguishable features of these movie stars, he created one fictional character, Vardell Duseldorfer or VD. VD is an aged and retired action movie star who is now a drug addict and alcoholic. VD plans to return to fame through directing and starring in a science fiction movie called Hard Times on Mars.

As shooting for the film begins, it is clear that VD is out of touch and not performing. VD refuses to alter the poorly-written script, breaks sets, and states that he no longer wants to release the movie. At the peak of the chaos, VD suffers a heart attack.

Following his heart attack, VD's attends the premiere of his movie in Los Angeles, which, as it turns out, is a great success.

== Cast ==
- Brian Thompson as Vardell "VD" Duseldorfer
- Marisa Ramirez as Maria
- Ian Patrick Williams as Sir Jeffrey
- Gary Graham as Burton, a producer
- Michelle Lawrence as Emily
- Lee Garlington as Paint
- Carl Ciarfalio as 1st AD
- Lorielle New as Sue
- Adam J. Smith as Best Boy
- Ron Thomas as Mark, a stunt coordinator
- Mark Dacascos as Mark, a screenwriter
- Sawyer as Soundman
- Leslie Garza Rivera as Salma Hayek
- Tara Gray, Ralek Gracie, Martin Kove, Kevin Sorbo, Bruce Locke, Patrick Warburton and Craig Kilborn make cameo appearances.
