= Love Is in the Air (2013 film) =

- Directed by: Alexandre Castagnetti
- Starring: Ludivine Sagnier; Nicolas Bedos; Jackie Berroyer
- Cinematography: Yannick Ressigeac
- Edited by: Scott Stevenson
- Music by: Nicolas Wauquiez; Evymoon
- Distributed by: Universal Pictures International France
- Release date: 3 April 2013
- Running time: 96 minutes
- Country: France
- Language: French
- Budget: $5.1 million
- Box office: $2.8 million

Love Is in the Air (French: Amour & turbulences) is a 2013 French romantic comedy film directed by Alexandre Castagnetti.

== Synopsis ==
As the film opens, Antoine and Julie find themselves seated side by side on a return flight from New York to Paris where Julie is about to marry Franck. Antoine, a womanizing lawyer, is desperate to get to Paris for a job interview. The problem is that Julie and Antoine are former lovers who broke up after a chaotic affair three years before. Now they face a seven-hour flight in close quarters.

The film is structured with a framing device of Antoine and Julie explaining their relationship history to fellow passengers, depicted in flashbacks. This history includes their meeting, their first date, problems they faced, and their intentions to marry each other. Their relationship ends when Julie believes she has walked in on Antoine cheating on her, which Antoine explains was a misunderstanding. Antoine and Julie's explanations often contradict each other or lack crucial information and by recounting their memories they come to realise the truth of their history.

Despite the audience of fellow passengers expecting a reconciliation between the couple, Julie claims she is getting married in a couple of days and won't change her mind. They reach Paris, where they part ways at the airport. Julie's fiancé has sent a chauffeur to pick her up while Antoine goes to his interview.

In a twist the person Antoine is interviewing with is Julie's fiancé. Julie in the adjacent room hears Antoine say that it doesn't matter if he doesn't get this dream job as he had lost the love of his life that day. He thanks Franck for the opportunity and leaves. Julie realises that she would like to have an adventurous life with Antoine rather than a stable one with Franck.

Julie breaks off her engagement and chases Antoine's cab and they reconcile.

== Cast ==
- Ludivine Sagnier as Julie
- Nicolas Bedos as Antoine
- Jonathan Cohen as Hugo
- Arnaud Ducret as Franck
- Brigitte Catillon as Claire
- Jackie Berroyer as Arthur
- Clémentine Célarié as Marie
- Michel Vuillermoz as Georges
- Odile Vuillemin as Antoine's former girl-friend
- Lila Salet as Stéphanie
- Ina Castagnetti as Aïssa
- Sophie-Charlotte Husson as Nina
- Jérôme Charvet as Jérôme
- Jean-Philippe Goudroye as Renat

== Box office ==
The film performed poorly in the US, made $4,937 on its first weekend with a $8,425 total.
