= Falling Overnight =

- Film poster
- Directed by: Conrad Jackson
- Written by: Aaron Golden; Parker Croft; Conrad Jackson
- Produced by: Jed Rhein; Elizabeth Jackson
- Starring: Parker Croft; Emilia Zoryan
- Cinematography: Conrad Jackson
- Edited by: Conrad Jackson
- Production companies: Display Purposes Only; Cerebroscope Films; Dried Lemon Productions
- Release date: 2011
- Running time: 86 minutes
- Country: United States
- Language: English

Falling Overnight is a 2011 American drama film directed by Conrad Jackson and written by Parker Croft, Aaron Golden, and Conrad Jackson. Falling Overnight stars Parker Croft and Emilia Zoryan

== Plot ==
Falling Overnight tells the story of 22-year-old Elliot Carson (Parker Croft) on the day before he has surgery to remove a brain tumor. Facing what could be his last night, Elliot’s path intersects with Chloe Webb (Emilia Zoryan), a beautiful young photographer who invites him to her art show. Scared and alone, Elliot welcomes the distraction and as the night descends, Chloe takes him on an intimate and exhilarating journey through the city. But as morning approaches, and Chloe learns of Elliot’s condition, the magic of the evening unravels, and they must together face the uncertainty of Elliot’s future.

== Cast ==
- Parker Croft as Elliot Carson
- Emilia Zoryan as Chloe Webb
- Barak Hardley as Toby
- Millie Zinner as Mel
- Jake Olson as Kevin
- Elizabeth Jackson as Samantha
- Nathalie Antonia as Eva
- Jérôme Charvet as Julian
- Christian Yeager as Jake
- Jon Michael Hill as Troy

== Reception ==
On review aggregator Rotten Tomatoes, the film holds a rating of 40% based on 5 reviews, with an average score of 4.9/10.
