= Zombeavers =

2014 film by Jordan Rubin

- American theatrical film poster by Jordan Rubin in 2015
- Directed by: Jordan Rubin
- Written by: Al Kaplan; Jordan Rubin; Jon Kaplan
- Story by: Al Kaplan; Jordan Rubin; Jon Kaplan
- Produced by: Evan Astrowsky; Chris Bender; Christopher Lemole
- Starring: Rachel Melvin; Cortney Palm; Lexi Atkins; Hutch Dano; Jake Weary; Peter Gilroy; Rex Linn
- Cinematography: Jonathan Hall
- Edited by: Ed Marx; Seth Flaum
- Music by: Al Kaplan; Jon Kaplan
- Production companies: Armory Films; BenderSpink
- Distributed by: Freestyle Releasing; Epic Pictures
- Release dates: April 19, 2014 (Tribeca Film Festival); December 26, 2014 (DVD); March 20, 2015 (United States)
- Running time: 76 minutes
- Country: United States
- Language: English
- Box office: $54,985

Zombeavers is a 2014 American horror comedy, direct-to-video film directed by Jordan Rubin, based on a script by Al Kaplan, Jordan Rubin, and Jon Kaplan. The film follows a group of college kids staying at a riverside cottage that are attacked by a swarm of zombie beavers. A trailer for the film was released in early February 2014 and went viral. The film had its world premiere on April 19, 2014, at the Tribeca Film Festival. The film was released direct-to-video in December 2014, receiving a brief limited theatrical release in the U.S. on March 20, 2015.

== Plot ==
While transporting toxic chemicals, a pair of truckers strike a deer and lose one of their canisters. It rolls into a river, floats downstream, and splashes several beavers at their dam.

Later, college students Mary, Zoe, and Jenn arrive at Mary's cousin's cabin near the dam. Although Zoe and Jenn are distraught that there is no cell phone coverage, Mary insists that they spend the next two days without interruptions from technology or boys. While swimming at the lake, the girls discover the beaver dam. When Jenn swims closer to see a beaver, they are surprised by a bear. Smyth, a local hunter, scares off the bear and admonishes the girls to stay away from the beavers and dress more appropriately.

At night, the girls' boyfriends – Buck, Tommy, and Sam – arrive and play a prank on them. Annoyed, Mary orders them to leave, but Zoe, who knew they were coming, insists they stay. Jenn talks Mary into letting them stay, as she wants to resolve her relationship issues with Sam, who has cheated on her. As the couples separate, Jenn leaves to take a shower, only to be attacked by a beaver. Tommy kills it with a baseball bat, but Jenn and Mary feel something is wrong with it beyond rabies. They put the corpse in a bag and put it outside on the porch. In the morning, they discover it is missing, and Jenn insists that it was not merely eaten by wildlife.

All but Jenn go swimming in the lake. Sam and Mary discuss whether to tell Jenn about their affair, but they are interrupted when beavers chew off Buck's foot and scratch Tommy. The same beaver that attacked Jenn earlier chases her back to the house. She pins it to the counter with a knife, but not before it scratches her leg. Sam throws Zoe's dog into the water as a distraction, and the rest of the group flee to the house, where they realize the beavers have cut the phone lines. As zombie beavers surround the house, Tommy offers to leave with Buck to get help, and Zoe accompanies him. Their drive is interrupted as the beavers bring down a tree in the road, and Tommy sets off on foot, only to be crushed by another falling tree.

Smyth rescues Buck and Zoe, and they drive in his pickup truck to return to the house, which has been boarded up by the others. Unable to enter it, they go to the neighbors' house. They discover the neighbors are dead, and their phone lines cut. As a result of her wounds, Jenn turns into a beaver-like zombie and attacks Mary. As Jenn's saliva falls in Mary's mouth, Sam rescues Mary by hitting Jenn from behind. Mary and Sam lock themselves in the bathroom and check each other for scratches. Satisfied that neither is wounded, they begin to have sex, but zombified Jenn interrupts them and kills Sam by biting off his penis. Meanwhile, Buck turns into a zombie and attacks Smyth. Zoe escapes by jumping through a window, bloodying herself in the process.

As a beaver accidentally sets Mary's cousin's house on fire, Sam rises as a zombie. Once Mary kills Sam, she reunites with Zoe. Smyth, now zombified, shoots at them as they flee in his truck. Jenn jumps on top of the truck, but Zoe runs her over. Together, Mary and Zoe reach the spot where Tommy died and turned into a zombie. With the road blocked, they decide to walk. Believing that Zoe may be bitten due to her bloody appearance, Mary holds her at gunpoint with a pistol recovered from Smyth's truck. As Zoe protests that she is not infected, Mary begins changing into a zombie. Zoe kills her with an axe and walks away. On the road, she encounters the same truckers who had earlier dropped the canister, and they run over her accidentally. In a post-credits sequence, a honeybee becomes infected from a corpse and returns to its hive in a zombified state.

== Cast ==
- Rachel Melvin as Mary Daughtry
- Cortney Palm as Zoe
- Lexi Atkins as Jenn
- Hutch Dano as Sam
- Jake Weary as Tommy
- Peter Gilroy as Buck
- Bill Burr as Joseph
- Rex Linn as Smyth
- Brent Briscoe as Winston Gregorson
- Phyllis Katz as Myrne Gregorson
- Robert R. Shafer as Trucker
- Chad Anderson as Adam
- Jamie, David and Eoin as the Debauchery Beavers
- John Mayer as Luke
- Fred Tatasciore as the voice of the zombie beavers

== Production ==
Al Kaplan, Jordan Rubin, and Jon Kaplan began working on the script for Zombeavers in 2012. Rubin then put together a proof of concept trailer compiled from footage from various horror movies, BBC nature shows, and social media outlets and presented the trailer to BenderSpink and Armory Films. The two companies agreed to finance the film and the film went into pre-production shortly thereafter. The film features animatronic models of beavers as opposed to CGI special effects, and the models were created by Creature Effects. Actresses Cortney Palm, Rachel Melvin, and Lexi Atkins, along with comedian/actor Bill Burr, were all confirmed to be performing in the film. Principal photography took place in Santa Clarita, California at the Disney Ranch over a period of 21 days and with a small budget. Epic Pictures Group uploaded the first official trailer for the film on February 6, 2014, and the trailer quickly went viral, amassing over a million views in less than a week. The same month the production company also created several film posters parodying Oscar Award nominated films Gravity, American Hustle, and Her.

== Release ==
The film had its world premiere on April 19, 2014, at the Tribeca Film Festival and was theatrically released in the U.S. on March 20, 2015. In December 2014, the film was released on DVD.

== Reception ==
=== Critical response ===
On the review aggregator website Rotten Tomatoes, 72% of 36 critics' reviews are positive. The website's consensus reads: "Zombeavers obviously isn't high art, but it delivers just enough of the gory insanity promised by the title to earn a recommendation for genre fans." Metacritic, which uses a weighted average, assigned the film a score of 44 out of 100, based on 6 critics, indicating "mixed or average" reviews.

Brent McKnight of giantfreakinrobot said, "It's as much of a blast as you could hope for." Rob Hunter of Film School Rejects called the film "funny, smart, consistently entertaining". Jason Gorber of Twitch Film "commend[s] its tenacious nature to mine every last drop of narrative and complexity out of a very slight but very funny idea." Frank Scheck of The Hollywood Reporter said, "The world’s population can safely be divided into two camps: those eager to see a movie called Zombeavers and, well, everyone else. The former may well find themselves satisfied by Jordan Rubin's feature debut in which a sextet consisting of three frequently scantily clad coeds and their boyfriends find themselves trapped in a remote cabin while being attacked by a horde of, you guessed it, zombie beavers."

Variety gave Zombeavers a mostly negative review, commenting that "this debut feature for standup and sketch-comedy vet Rubin is not without flashes of ingenuity, but the one-joke premise wears thin even before the mercifully brief 76-minute running time is up... Zombeavers is not a total wash, and seen at night, under the right combination of low expectations and controlled substances, it may even seem better than it really is." The Los Angeles Times was ambivalent as they felt that the film was "a fun idea and, like a good undead animal, has some solid designs on hitting its target" but that this "doesn't necessarily save the experience of watching the film from being anything other than hairy."

=== Box office ===
Zombeavers was released in Austria on November 7, 2014, where it grossed $31,634. It opened in the United States on March 20, 2015, and ended the weekend with a 63rd-place finish grossing $8,163 from eleven screens. As of April 5, 2015, the total US gross is $14,947, for a total worldwide gross of $54,985.

== Soundtrack ==
The soundtrack was composed by Al and Jon Kaplan. It features songs from the Kaplan brothers' band, Legolambs. The soundtrack was released on April 24, 2015, via La-La Land Records. The film also features soundscape from SoundCloud.
