= Parker Croft =

American actor

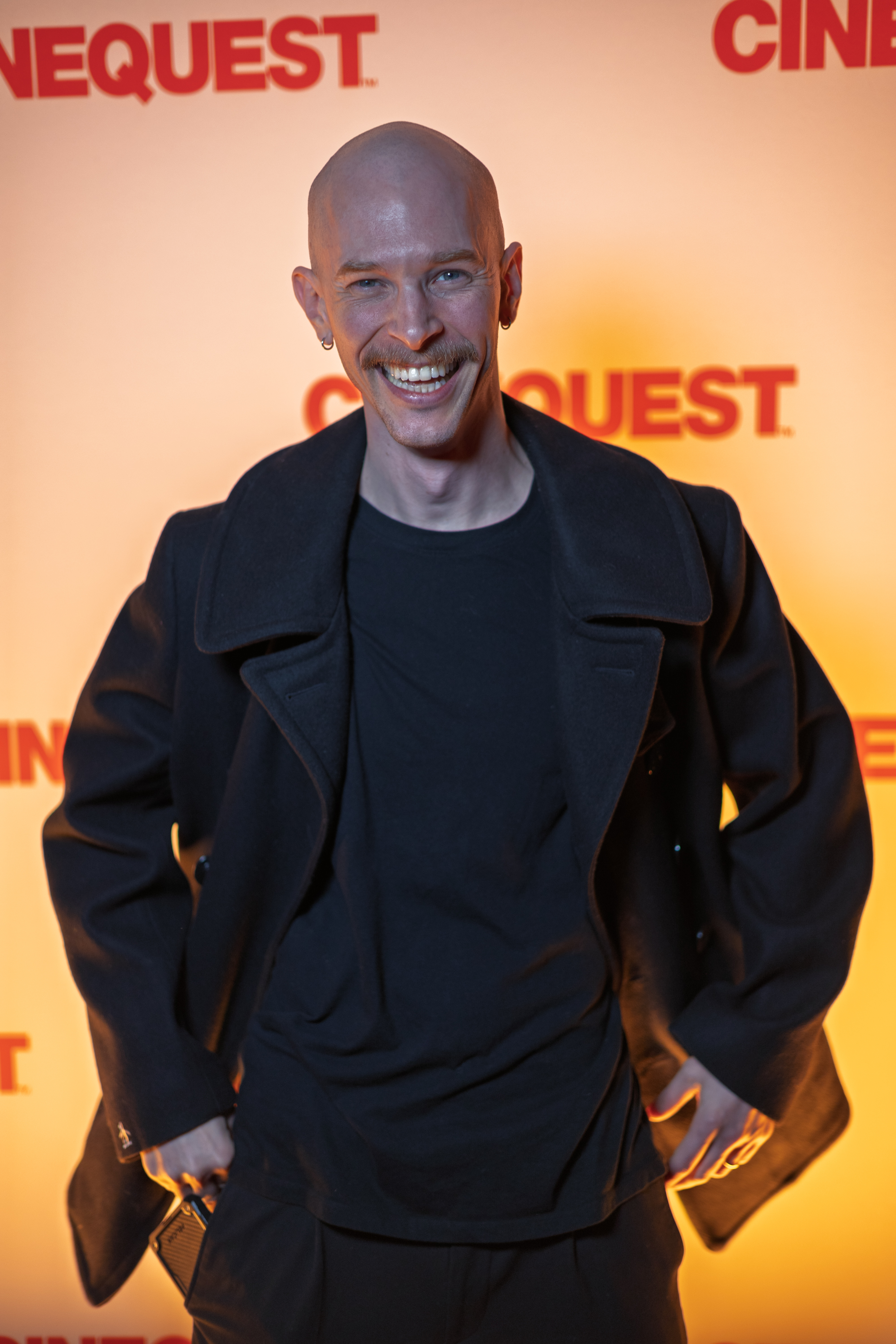
- Croft at the Cinequest Film Festival in 2026
- Born: Parker Hendrick Croft III; January 13, 1987 (age 39); Burlington, Vermont, U.S.
- Occupations: Actor, Writer
- Years active: 2006 – present

Parker Croft (born January 13, 1987) is an American actor and screenwriter, most famous for his role as Felix on Once Upon a Time.

== Early life ==
Parker Croft was born in Burlington, Vermont and raised in Northern Vermont. His mother, Juliet McVicker, is a jazz singer; his father, Parker Hendrick Croft Jr., is an architect, and a painter. Children's theater was Parker's introduction to acting in 1994, at the age of seven. Soon after, he began working with the Vermont Stage Company.

Parker's schooling was varied. He attended public and private schools, as well as experimenting with home schooling. Prior to his graduation from the White Mountain School, Parker received a scholarship to the Perry Mansfield School for the Performing Arts, a summer school for aspiring teen actors. This led him to New York City, where he completed study at the Stella Adler Studio, the William Esper Studio, and the Herbert Berghof Studio.

== Career ==
Parker Croft made his film debut as John in the teen movie, Hooking Up with co-stars Corey Feldman and Bronson Pinchot. One year later he appeared as the gay bashing bully Cooper in Were the World Mine (2008), an independent musical film, based on A Midsummer Night's Dream, in which he sang for the soundtrack.

Parker's television debut was on the FX show Nip/Tuck as Enigma. From his performance in Nip/Tuck Parker was offered a role in Nuclear Family (2010) alongside Ray Wise and Corin Nemec.

Parker's television credits include the FX pilot Back Nine (Creator Jason Filardi), the NBC pilot 1600 Penn, and the Gigapix pilot Adult Life (Creator Conrad Jackson)

In addition to acting, Parker is also a writer. In 2010 he co-wrote Falling Overnight in collaboration with partners Aaron Golden, and Conrad Jackson as a vehicle for his first leading role.

== Personal life ==
Parker lives in Los Angeles.

As of June 2016, he is married to Elisa Croft.

== Filmography ==
=== Film ===
Actor
| Year | Title | Role | Notes |
|---|---|---|---|
| 2006 | Hooking up | John | |
| 2008 | Sky People | Estranged Son | Short Film |
| 2008 | Were the World Mine | Cooper | |
| 2010 | Falling Overnight | Elliot Carson | Nashville Film Festival Best Actor Award; Jacksonville Film Festival Best Actor Award; Blue Whiskey Indipendnet Film Festival Best Actor Award; Visionfest The Jack Nance Breakthrough Performance Award |
| 2014 | Field of Lost Shoes | Garland Jefferson | |

Music Credits
| Year | Title | Song Performed |
|---|---|---|
| 2008 | Were the World Mine | "Pyramus & Thisby" |

=== Television ===
| Year | Show | Role | Episode(s) & Notes |
|---|---|---|---|
| 2009 | Nip/Tuck | Jared 'Enigma' McCloud | 6.02 "Enigma" |
| 2009 | The Back Nine | Ben Hogan | 1.01 "Pilot" |
| 2012 | Nuclear Family | The Son | |
| 2012 | 1600 Penn | Mike | 1.01 "Pilot" |
| 2012 | American Horror Story: Asylum | Devon | 2.03 "Nor'easter" |
| 2013 | Once Upon a Time | Felix | 11 episodes |
| 2016 | Roadies | Dean Kilpatrick | 8 "The All Night Bus Ride" |
| 2016 | Pitch | Jordan Collins | 5 "Alfonzo Guzman-Chavez" |
| 2017 | Big Little Lies | Brent | 2 "Serious Mothering" |
