= Jergens =

Jergens is a surname. Notable people with the surname include:

- Adele Jergens (1917–2002), American actress
- Diane Jergens (1935–2018), American film and television actress

== See also ==
- Andrew Jergens Company
- Jurgens
