= Brian Thompson (actor) =

American actor (born 1959)

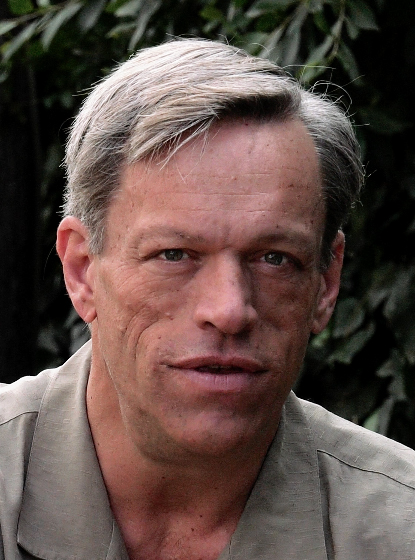
- Thompson in 2017
- Born: Brian Earl Thompson; August 28, 1959 (age 67); Ellensburg, Washington, U.S.
- Education: Central Washington University (BBA); University of California, Irvine (MFA)
- Occupation: Actor
- Years active: 1984–present
- Known for: Cobra (1986 film)
- Children: 2

Brian Earl Thompson (born August 28, 1959) is an American actor. His career began with a small role in the 1984 film The Terminator. He played the villainous "Night Slasher" in the 1986 film Cobra. His first named role was on Werewolf, a horror series that ran during Fox's inaugural broadcasting year of 1987–1988. Thompson has played several characters in the Star Trek franchise—the most notable being the Klingon Lieutenant Klag, who informed Commander William Riker that "Gagh is always best when served live", the Alien Bounty Hunter on The X-Files, and Eddie Fiori on Kindred: The Embraced. In 2014, he produced, wrote and starred in the B movie parody The Extendables.

== Early life ==
Thompson was born in Ellensburg, Washington, and raised in Longview. He attended Central Washington University, where he studied business management, played football, and appeared in many school productions. He then moved to California and earned a Master of Fine Arts from the University of California, Irvine. He initially trained and pursued a career in musical theater, performing at Riverside Civil Light Opera's production of The King and I, Long Beach Civic Light Opera's Bitter Sweet, and several other musicals. In 1982, he was a resident actor at the Colorado Shakespeare Festival.

Thompson's athletic build and unique facial structure were key in the initial roles he was offered. He has stated that it has occasionally been a double-edged sword when it comes to auditioning for roles, but it has provided him with consistent work. Thompson said, "If you're very physical in stature, you're gonna get hired for action movies. The star's always going to be chasing someone so they need an equal adversary. I'm never going to play a nebbish geek."

== Career ==
Thompson was cast in The Terminator while still in school. He and Bill Paxton had minor roles as punk thugs.

He followed that up with roles on Moonlighting, Otherworld, Street Hawk and Knight Rider before landing a role in the Sylvester Stallone vehicle, Cobra (1986). Although the film was critically panned, it was a commercial success. The New York Times wrote of Thompson's portrayal, "the archvillain, a character that is a cross between a James Bond fantasy villain such as Jaws and a raging psychopath, delivers a scorching monologue – a feat of linguistic sophistication that Cobra would have a hard time matching."

In 1993, Thompson landed another comedic role on the large ensemble series Key West which was filmed on location in the Florida Keys. The series lasted for 13 episodes. He played a "new-age sheriff", which Thompson has stated was the favorite role of his career. The character uttered the introductory line, "I'm Sheriff Cody Jeremiah Jefferson. I'm a direct descendant of Wyatt Earp and the Lone Ranger. My personal heroes are Ted Nugent, Buddha and Davy Crockett. I am the last real lawman and the first peace officer of the 21st century."

The following year, Thompson began his tenure on The X-Files and followed that with roles in the science fiction-fantasy series Seven Days, Buffy the Vampire Slayer and Charmed. Between these, Thompson made dozens of appearances in other series and films. In 1996, he appeared in Dragonheart as Brok, the commander of the armies of David Thewlis' villainous king, Einon. The fantasy film, starring Dennis Quaid and Sean Connery, was a moderate success.

Thompson then returned to the big screen as lead antagonist Shao Kahn in the poorly received Mortal Kombat Annihilation. The New York Times called it "colossal compendium of logic-defying martial arts, noisy, hyperactive special effects..." In 2014, Thompson released The Extendables, a film he produced, wrote, and starred in. A parody of movies like The Expendables, Thompson stated that it contained true-to-life instances from his own career. It was released via iTunes. In 2017 Thompson was in the thriller indie film Trafficked with Ashley Judd, and in 2019 he starred in the horror film Hoax alongside Adrienne Barbeau; in 2022 he appeared in the historical thriller film The Tragedy of Macbeth with Denzel Washington.

=== Star Trek ===
In 1989, Thompson landed his first Star Trek role on Star Trek: The Next Generation. His size worked against him at first, because the producers were originally looking to cast someone who could fit in a certain costume. He was able to convince them to give him a try: "That was the first of five auditions that I've had for Star Trek and they've hired me every time." Thompson played a Klingon in the episode "A Matter of Honor". In 1993 and 1996, he appeared in episodes of Star Trek: Deep Space Nine as different characters. In 1994, he appeared in the feature film Star Trek Generations.

In 2005, Thompson was cast as Admiral Valdore in three episodes of Star Trek: Enterprise. Thompson has since participated in Star Trek fandom, giving narrative DVD extras and appearing at conventions.

== Personal life ==
Thompson is a standup paddleboarding, windsurfing, and kiteboarding enthusiast, and also studies hapkido. He has two children.

== Selected filmography ==
=== Film ===
Year	Title	Role	Notes
1984	The Terminator	Rick	
1986	Cobra	'The Night Slasher'	
1986	¡Three Amigos!	German Thug	
1987	Catch the Heat (film)	Danny Boy	
1987	Pass the Ammo	Kenny Hamilton	
1988	Fright Night Part 2	Bozworth	
1988	Alien Nation	Trent Porter	
1988	Miracle Mile	Helicopter Pilot	
1989	Three Fugitives	Second Thug	
1989	Nightwish	Dean	
1990	Lionheart	Russell / Roc	
1990	Moon 44	Jake O'Neal	
1990	After the Shock	Tom	TV movie
1990	Hired to Kill	Frank Ryan	
1991	Life Stinks	Mean Victor	
1992	Doctor Mordrid	Kabal	
1992	Rage and Honor	Conrad Drago	
1993	The Naked Truth	Bruno	
1994	Star Trek Generations	Klingon Helmsman	
1996	Dragonheart	Brok	
1997	Mortal Kombat Annihilation	Shao Kahn	
1997	Perfect Target	Major Oxnard	
2001	Joe Dirt	Bob 'Buffalo Bob'	
2001	Epoch	Captain Tower	
2001	The Order	Cyrus Jacob	
2007	Fist of the Warrior	Max	
2007	Flight of the Living Dead: Outbreak on a Plane	Kevin	
2009	Dragonquest	Kirill	
2011	The Arcadian	Agmundr	
2014	The Extendables	Vardell 'V.D.' Duseldorfer	Also writer, producer and director
2016	Beyond the Game		
2017	Dark Games	Detective Joe Grimes	
2017	Trafficked	Max	
2019	Hoax	John Singer	
2019	I Am That Man	Halpin	
2019	Disappearance	Captain Cody	
2020	Big Muddy	Wyatt Cooper	
2021	The Tragedy of Macbeth	Young Murderer	

=== Television ===
Year	Title	Role	Notes
1984	Hardcastle and McCormick	Police Officer	Episode: "Ties My Father Sold Me"
1985	Knight Rider	Kurt	Episode: "Sky Knight"
1985	Otherworld	D.I. #2	1 episode
1988	Favorite Son	Rolf Petersen	3 episodes
1988	Werewolf	Nicholas Remy	3 episodes
1989	Star Trek: The Next Generation	Klingon Officer Klag	Episode: "A Matter of Honor"
1990	Alien Nation	Peter Rabbit	Episode: "Rebirth"
1993	Key West	Sheriff Cody Jeremiah Jefferson	13 episodes
1993–1996	Star Trek: Deep Space Nine	Inglatu/Toman'torax	Episodes: "Rules of Acquisition" and "To the Death"
1995–2000	The X-Files	Alien Bounty Hunter	9 episodes
1995	Hercules: The Legendary Journeys	Goth the Barbarian	Episode: "Siege at Naxos"
1996	Kindred: The Embraced	Eddie Fiori (leader of the Brujah vampire clan)	6 episodes
1997–1998	Buffy the Vampire Slayer	Luke/The Judge	Episodes: "Welcome to the Hellmouth", "The Harvest", "Surprise", "Innocence"
1998	NYPD Blue	Todd	Episode: "Czech Bouncer"
2000	Charmed	Horseman of War	Episode: "Apocalypse, Not"
2000	Jason and the Argonauts	Hercules	Miniseries
2002	Birds of Prey	The Crawler	Episode: "Split"
2003	Charmed	Titan Cronos	Episode: "Oh My Goddess (Part 1 & 2)"
2004	NCIS	Master Chief Vince Nutter	Episode: "The Truth Is Out There"
2005	Star Trek: Enterprise	Romulan Admiral Valdore	3 episodes
2009	Chuck	Cliff Arculin / Cliff Siljak	Episode: "Chuck Versus the Suburbs"
2012	Californication	Mr. Scary	Episode: "At the Movies"
2012	Spirit of a Denture	Captain Jasper Crow	Short film
2014	Hawaii Five-0	Internal Affairs Detective Nicholas Cruz	Episode: "Hana Lokomaika'i"
2017	The Orville	Drogen	Episode: "Into the Fold"
2018–2024	9-1-1	Captain Vincent Gerrard	6 episodes
2021	NCIS: Los Angeles	CIA Officer Steven Erdnase	Episode: "Through the Looking Glass"
2025–2026	Fallout	Coronado Elder	2 episodes
