= List of Bosch episodes =

Bosch is an American police procedural television series produced by Amazon Studios. It stars Titus Welliver as Los Angeles Police detective Harry Bosch.

The first season of the show, developed for Amazon by Eric Overmyer, takes its inspiration from three of Michael Connelly's novels: City of Bones, Echo Park, and The Concrete Blonde. It was released in complete on February 13, 2015.

On March 18, 2015, Bosch was renewed for a second season, which takes inspiration from Connelly's novels Trunk Music, The Drop, and The Last Coyote. The second season premiered on March 11, 2016. The next season adapting The Black Echo and A Darkness More Than Night premiered on April 21, 2017. The fourth season, based on Angels Flight was released on April 13, 2018. The fifth season, based on Two Kinds of Truth, was released on April 19, 2019. The sixth season, based on The Overlook and Dark Sacred Night, was released a day early on April 16, 2020. The seventh and final season was released on June 25, 2021. The series was followed by a spin-off Bosch: Legacy.

== Series overview ==
Season	Episodes		Originally released
1	10	1	February 6, 2014
1	10	9	February 13, 2015
2	10		March 11, 2016
3	10		April 21, 2017
4	10		April 13, 2018
5	10		April 19, 2019
6	10		April 16, 2020
7	8		June 25, 2021

== Episodes ==
=== Season 1 (2015) ===
No. overall	No. in season	Title	Directed by	Written by	Original release date
1	1	"Chapter One: 'Tis the Season"	Jim McKay	Michael Connelly & Eric Overmyer	February 6, 2014^{[1]}
Detective Harry Bosch and his partner Detective Jerry Edgar are involved in a fatal shooting incident while pursuing a suspect. A departmental investigation clears Bosch, but the family of the suspect sues him in a wrongful death suit. Bosch takes a case when a doctor's dog finds a child's bone. The finding of the bone re-opens a cold case from 1989. During the investigation, Bosch meets rookie police officer Julia Brasher and forms a connection with her. While in the morgue, the coroner details the abuse of the child to Bosch who gets flashbacks of when he was abused as a child.
2	2	"Chapter Two: Lost Light"	Kevin Dowling	Tom Smuts & Eric Overmyer	February 13, 2015
A patrol unit pulls over a van and officers discover a man's naked body in the back. Meanwhile, Detectives Bosch and Edgar continue the investigation of the dead child by re-interviewing convicted paedophile Nicholas Trent. Bosch argues with Deputy Chief Irving over his ongoing court battle. Brasher spends the night with Bosch. The driver of the van, identified as Raynard Waits, seeks a deal to avoid the death penalty by pleading guilty and revealing the locations of all the victims, including the child in Bosch's case. Bosch and Edgar return to Trent's home and find that Trent has committed suicide by hanging.
3	3	"Chapter Three: Blue Religion"	Kevin Dowling	Diane Frolov & Andrew Schneider	February 13, 2015
Deputy Chief Irving tries to get Bosch and Edgar to declare Trent murdered the boy on the hill, but Bosch remains unconvinced, further angering Captain Pounds. A tip identifies the body as Arthur Delacroix, a runaway from a troubled home. District Attorney and political climber Rick O'Shea informs Bosch that Waits has confessed to Delacroix's murder and orders Bosch to confirm the story. Bosch and Brasher have a fight but soon reconcile. Waits reveals details of contents from Delacroix's backpack that only the police knew. Bosch wonders how Waits could have known.
4	4	"Chapter Four: Fugazi"	Ernest Dickerson	George Pelecanos & Michael Connelly	February 13, 2015
Sergeant "Mank" Mankiewicz (Scott Klace) tells Bosch that the officer who pulled over Waits may have done so illegally. Bosch and Edgar get confirmation the body is Arthur Delacroix. Bosch's trial is concluded, and the jury rules in favour of the plaintiff. However, the jury only fines Bosch one dollar. Irving orders Bosch to oversee a field trip where Waits will show the police and the DA where he killed his victims. Against the advice of Bosch, DA O'Shea orders Bosch to release Waits's handcuffs. Waits uses the opportunity to escape by stealing Detective Moore's gun and shooting Moore and the Deputy DA. Bosch swears to an injured Moore that he'll get Waits.
5	5	"Chapter Five: Mama's Boy"	Ernest Dickerson	William N. Fordes	February 13, 2015
DC Irving informs Bosch that DA O'Shea is publicly blaming Bosch for Waits's escape and that Captain Pounds will be leading the task force to catch him. Waits enters the house of an elderly woman (who turns out to be his mother) who calls him David. Waits asks his mother, who is unaware of his crimes, if he can spend Christmas with her and she happily agrees. Bosch and Edgar interview Delacroix's father Sam, during which a drunken Sam breaks down and declares that he killed his own son, but seems stunned by the abuse allegations. In a later interview, Bosch becomes unconvinced of Sam's guilt. Bosch searches Sam's house and finds evidence Sam molested his daughter Sheila. Waits picks up another male prostitute and murders him.
6	6	"Chapter Six: Donkey's Years"	Roxann Dawson	Jennifer Ames & Steve Turner	February 13, 2015
Waits taunts Bosch, leading Bosch to another murder scene at a hardware store. Bosch heads to Las Vegas to visit his ex-wife Eleanor Wish and his daughter Maddie for Christmas but also wants Eleanor's skills as a former FBI profiler to get her opinion on Waits. Officer Brasher is shot in the ribs and claims it happened in a struggle. Bosch is certain he saw Brasher accidentally shoot herself.
7	7	"Chapter Seven: Lost Boys"	Alex Zakrzewski	Joe Gonzalez & Eric Overmyer	February 13, 2015
Bosch revisits Brasher to tell her he knows the truth about the shooting, and Brasher calls Bosch a hypocrite. Waits attempts to pick up a man on the highway only to fail to kill him, which leads DC Irving to assign Bosch to find Waits independent of Captain Pounds's task force. Bosch searches Waits's last known address and finds evidence of Waits's obsession with old Parisian catacombs and skulls, which leads Eleanor to speculate that Waits may be building an underground monument of his own. Bosch realizes he and Waits were both in the same orphanage giving Bosch his first lead on Waits's real identity. Waits murders his mother, telling her that he loves her.
8	8	"Chapter Eight: High Low"	Matt Earl Beesley	William N. Fordes & Tom Smuts	February 13, 2015
Captain Pounds informs Brasher her statement is a lie and implies he'll back her if she reports Bosch for sexual harassment. A new lead in the Delacroix case suggests Trent really did kill the boy, but further review convinces Bosch that Johnny Stokes killed Delacroix for his skateboard. A murder of a prostitute is very similar to his mother's murder, which draws Bosch back into the Waits case.
9	9	"Chapter Nine: The Magic Castle"	Alex Zakrzewski	Diane Frolov & Andrew Schneider	February 13, 2015
Edgar informs an angry rank and file that Stokes is wanted for Delacroix's murder, which forces both Mank and Edgar to defend Bosch. Waits kidnaps a young mother. Bosch calls Eleanor for help, and she tells Bosch the mother is bait for him. Bosch and Edgar track down Waits and his hostage. Waits aims a gun at Bosch, which forces Bosch to kill him. In the aftermath, Irving informs Bosch that Waits's gun was unloaded to which Bosch replies, “Suicide by cop”.
10	10	"Chapter Ten: Us and Them"	Thomas Carter	Michael Connelly & T.L. Lankford	February 13, 2015
Bosch sees the department therapist about the Waits shooting. Maddie runs away to LA. After being caught, Stokes claims Delacroix's death was an accident. Stokes is released since he was a juvenile when he killed Delacroix. Captain Pounds approaches Bosch to shame him for not jailing Stokes, but Bosch warns Pounds to leave him alone. Pounds grabs Bosch's arm, and Bosch shoves Pounds through a window in front of Mank. Pounds screams that Bosch will regret that incident, but Bosch walks away, happy enough that he'll now spend time with his daughter. Bosch turns in his gun and badge to Billets and prepares to go to see his daughter. However before Bosch leaves he receives a call to a crime scene where he finds that Sam has killed Stokes in revenge for killing his son.

=== Season 2 (2016) ===
No. overall	No. in season	Title	Directed by	Written by	Original release date
11	1	"Trunk Music"	Alex Zakrzewski	Eric Overmyer	March 11, 2016
O'Shea continues to plan his run for mayor. Billets assigns Bosch to a case of a dead body in a car trunk, identified as Anthony Allen, a pornographer who recently returned from Las Vegas. Bosch and Edgar go to question Allen's widow, Veronica, a former stripper who suspects that Allen was seeing a girlfriend in Vegas. Whilst at Allen's residence Bosch and Edgar meet a former LAPD detective Carl Nash, now Allen's head of security. Nash offers to assist Bosch in his investigation. Elsewhere Billets and other investigators find a hidden compartment in Allen's car containing a large sum of cash. Chief Irving's son George goes undercover for Internal Affairs investigating Narcotics Detective Eddie Arceneaux.
12	2	"The Thing About Secrets"	Alex Zakrzewski	Eric Overmyer & Tom Bernardo	March 11, 2016
Attempts to get information about Allen's death are blocked by Special Agent Griffin who tells them only that Allen was a minor player in a "national security" case. George Irving continues working with Arceneaux who is careful not to show any of his shakedowns on camera. Edgar finds paperwork showing Tony Allen changed his name and was previously a member of an Armenian street gang that evolved into a criminal empire. Mayor Ramos meets with Irving to ask for his support. Bosch approaches Veronica Allen and informs her that he suspects Allen was part of a money laundering operation, Veronica states that she suspected this was the case.
13	3	"Victim of the Night"	Pieter Jan Brugge	Diane Frolov & Andrew Schneider	March 11, 2016
Bosch heads to Las Vegas to track Tony Allen's movements before he died. George doubts that Arceneaux is part of a larger group, but his handler disagrees. Bosch is partnered in Las Vegas with Detective Iverson who tells him Allen could have been working for Joey Marks, an Armenian gangster that the LVPD wants to take down. Bosch goes to Allen's favourite strip club to locate Layla, Allen's current girlfriend, but manager Luke Rykov has Bosch thrown out. Bosch visit's Eleanor's house and becomes concerned when a casino security video shows her playing poker with Tony Allen days before his death. O'Shea announces his candidacy for mayor.
14	4	"Who's Lucky Now?"	Christine Moore	Tom Smuts	March 11, 2016
Bosch finds a gun in Rykov's bathroom. Arceneaux introduces George Irving to Maureen "Mo" O'Grady, a Vice Detective who also shakes down drug dealers. O'Grady encourages George to get closer to his father to leak information to her. The LVPD reveals Eleanor has minor ties to Marks and uses this to force Bosch to agree to a joint investigation. Edgar meets with a detective in the gang unit who tells him Marks and Allen are actually cousins and Marks has dealings with several terrorist organizations. Bosch and Iverson attempt to interrogate Rykov who angrily accuses them of planting the gun. The next day Marks and his attorney, Martin Weiss, approach Bosch with proof Rykov was in Las Vegas when Allen was murdered. Bosch goes to Eleanor to attempt to mend fences but ends up in another fight.
15	5	"Gone"	Ernest Dickerson	William N. Fordes	March 11, 2016
Carl Nash meets with Bosch and identifies Marks as a frequent visitor to Tony's house. Bosch and Edgar head to Las Vegas to extradite Rykov and search for Layla, who has disappeared. Bosch receives a call from a man with an Armenian accent, who informs Bosch he has Eleanor and Maddie and will trade them for Rykov. Rykov identifies the kidnappers and gives Bosch a location. Bosch and Edgar take down the kidnappers and rescue Eleanor and Maddie. George joins Arceneaux and O'Grady's crew in ripping off a drug stash house. Afterwards, he's introduced to their boss, who is revealed to be Nash. Nash and his crew take George to an oil pumpjack where he participates in an initiation ritual where he climbs to the top of the pumpjack an rides it like a rodeo. Whilst riding the pumpjack, O'Grady searches George's belongings and finds a hidden wire in his watch, confirming Nash's suspicions that George is an informant.
16	6	"Heart Attack"	Adam Davidson	Diane Frolov & Andrew Schneider	March 11, 2016
Agent Griffin reveals Rykov is actually an undercover FBI agent in the Marks organization and orders Bosch and Edgar to preserve Rykov's cover. Bosch reports to Billets stating he now thinks Rykov was set up to make Allen's murder appear to be a mob hit and suggests Veronica had her husband killed. A masked gunman murders George Irving. A devastated Chief Irving asks to speak to Arceneaux, but is refused by his superiors stating he is emotionally compromised. At home Connie is angry that Chief Irving allowed their son to undertake a dangerous operation without telling her. Nash reveals to Arceneaux that he set up George's murder after discovering George was an informant. Nash warns Arceneaux not to reveal anything to the police or else he will be framed for George's murder. Bosch and Edgar get a lead on Layla and question her priest, Father Tabakian, unaware that Tabakian is hiding Layla and preparing to get her out of the country. Nash meets with Veronica, whom he's having an affair with and conspiring with her to try and get Allen's money.
17	7	"Exit Time"	Kevin Dowling	Tom Smuts & Tom Bernardo	March 11, 2016
Bosch gives Eleanor information that Tony Allen may have buried the body of another undercover FBI agent in the Marks organization. Irving calls Bosch to his hotel to inform Bosch of his son's true assignment and asks Bosch to help him run a separate investigation. Arceneaux states he didn't know about George Irving's assassination but names Carl Nash as his boss. With this puzzle piece, Bosch deduces that Veronica Allen hired Nash to have her husband Tony Allen murdered. Veronica Allen breaks into Nash's apartment and plants incriminating evidence against Nash, intending to frame Nash and keep all of Allen's money for herself. Irving and Bosch break into Nash's house and discover the planted evidence; they decide to leave and apply for a search warrant to obtain the evidence legally. Nash finds the planted evidence and realizes that Veronica is setting him up. Later Maureen "Mo" O'Grady kills Arceneaux on Nash's orders.
18	8	"Follow the Money"	Alex Zakrzewski	William N. Fordes & Joe Gonzalez	March 11, 2016
Rykov thanks Bosch for keeping his cover and admits his real name is Luke Goshen. Irving attempts to return home finding that Connie has changed the locks and won't talk with him. Bosch and Edgar, along with the RHD Detectives Brad Conniff and Julie Espinosa investigating the murder of George Irving, raid Nash's house, only to find that Nash has already cleared out all incriminating evidence. Bosch and Edgar decide to stake out Veronica in the hope that she leads them to Nash. Bosch and Edgar discover that Veronica has snuck out of her house to go to the bank where Tony Allen hid the money. At the bank, Veronica, while being watched by Carl Nash's and Joey Marks' crews finds that Layla beat her there. A shootout occurs, killing Marks (along with several henchmen) and wounding Nash. Bosch and Edgar arrive and chase after Nash, who manages to escape after taking a hostage. Both Veronica and Maureen O'Grady are arrested.
19	9	"Queen of Martyrs"	Phil Abraham	Eric Overmyer & Tom Bernardo	March 11, 2016
Veronica Allen pleads ignorance and is released. A hunt for a wounded Nash begins. O'Grady confesses to the crimes of her crew. Mayor Ramos tells DC Irving that Chief Tenzer is resigning and Irving is the first choice to replace him. Irving agrees only if his son's murder investigation is treated fairly and Irving will only be the interim Chief. Veronica kills Father Tabakian for not giving her the stolen money. Bosch receives a call from an old friend of his mother's, Annette, who tells him she knows who killed his mother.
20	10	"Everybody Counts"	Tim Hunter	Michael Connelly & Terrill Lee Lankford	March 11, 2016
Annette admits she sent a client called Mitch to Bosch's mother and that he probably murdered her. Bosch investigates old records and finds the name Fox Mitchell. Bosch meets with retired Detective Caffrey, the lead detective on his mother's case. Caffrey claims that Fox Mitchell was a snitch for the narcotics division and the department ordered Mitchell left alone. Edgar and Bosch find Nash. Nash opens fire but is killed by his own grenade. Upon further investigation, Bosch discovers that Mitchell was previously assigned to the same narcotics team as Chief Irving. With Irving's assistance, Bosch tracks down Mitchell's last known residence only to discover that he has already died from cancer. Bosch later visits Mitchell's grave, dejected that he did not get to bring his mother's killer to justice

=== Season 3 (2017) ===
No. overall	No. in season	Title	Directed by	Written by	Original release date
21	1	"The Smog Cutter"	Adam Davidson	Eric Overmyer	April 21, 2017
Ramos is re-elected mayor in a landslide. Bosch begins tracking Ed Gunn, a murderer who got away with his crime. While Gunn is incarcerated on a drunk and disorderly charge, he is mysteriously bailed out despite having minimal time left on his sentence. Later Bosch goes to retrieve a hidden camera he planted to survey Gunn's apartment and notices two men entering Gunn's apartment and the event is caught on camera. Bosch, together with DDA Anita Benitez (Paola Turbay) preps the trial of Andrew Holland (John Ales), a Hollywood mogul accused of murder. Billy Meadows, a homeless veteran is murdered in a trailer. The murder of Meadows is witnessed by a graffiti artist who flees the scene. Bosch and Edgar are assigned to the murder of Meadows. Meadows' family informs them Meadows started using drugs after returning from deployment. Elsewhere, the trial of Veronica Allen reaches its conclusion, with the jury unable to reach a unanimous decision and a mistrial is declared. When DA O'Shea makes it clear that he will not seek to retry Allen, Bosch angrily and publicly confronts O'Shea, accusing him of intentionally sabotaging the case as a personal vendetta against Irving. The incident is filmed and goes viral, damaging Bosch's reputation.
22	2	"The Four Last Things"	Adam Davidson	Daniel Pyne	April 21, 2017
Ed Gunn is found dead outside a motel in an apparent suicide. Detective Robertson (Paul Calderon), investigating the murder of Ed Gunn, calls Bosch about his interest in Gunn. Bosch and Benitez interview another of Holland's victims. Billets orders Edgar to investigate Bosch as a suspect in the Gunn murder. Detective Robertson finds evidence to suspect a cop killed Gunn. Bosch and Edgar find leads in the Meadows case. Andrew Holland hosts a party and declares himself a victim of a conspiracy by Bosch. Edgar searches Gunn's apartment alone and finds a hidden camera and an owl statue engraved with a phrase that points him to the Dutch painter and namesake of his partner Hieronymus Bosch.
23	3	"God Sees"	Alex Zakrzewski	Tom Bernardo	April 21, 2017
Bosch visits Trevor Dobbs (Jeffrey Pierce), a former army buddy of Meadows. Bosch interviews Sharkey (Bridger Zadina), the tagger present on the night of Meadows' murder who claims not to have seen anything useful. Bosch meets with FBI Agent Luke Goshen (Matthew Lillard) to get more information on Meadows' army unit while Edgar asks Detective Jackson questions about Bosch's interest in Gunn. Dobbs meets with fellow ex-soldiers Woody and Xavi out in the desert. Woody has been carrying out surveillance on Bosch due to Bosch's investigation of Meadows's murder. Woody claims Bosch will not be a problem, however Dobbs warns them not to underestimate Bosch. Later, Bosch manages to detect Woody spying on his house. Woody flees with Bosch in pursuit, however Woody manages to escape
24	4	"El Compadre"	Sarah Pia Anderson	Jeffrey Fiskin	April 21, 2017
Maddie hits a car mirror during a driving lesson because Bosch is distracted and worried they have a tail. Bosch visits Sharkey's mother and on his way out gets a call that Sharkey's prints were on Meadows' RV door. Officers pick him up so Bosch can ask him some more questions. Irving meets with the CRT volunteer and finds out her brother was killed by gang violence. He asks her on a date. Bosch's and DDA Benitez's star witness Anabelle Crowe decides against testifying in the Holland trial because she is scared her profession will be revealed in court. Xavi (Max Arciniega), one of Trevor Dobbs' men, murders Sharkey to keep him from talking to Bosch anymore.
25	5	"Blood Under the Bridge"	Alex Zakrzewski	Elle Johnson	April 21, 2017
The murder of Sharkey takes a personal toll on Bosch who feels responsible for Sharkey's death. Upon examining Sharkey's corpse it becomes apparent, from choice of weapon and nature of the attack, that the perpetrator was trained in the military, causing Bosch to immediately suspect that Dobbs and his men are responsible. Bosch, Edgar and Billets disclose to Robertson their theory that Holland is trying to frame Bosch. Irving closes a chapter in his personal life but is ensnared in departmental politics. Agent Goshen reveals to Bosch that Dobbs and his crew have made several trips to the Middle East, however in the most recent trip the group excluded Meadows. Bosch theorises they are involved in a smuggling operation. Holland and his associates intensify their campaign to smear Bosch by leaking information about the police's investigation to the press. A former soldier named Jackson uses his position as a dock worker to aid Dobb's crew in smuggling cases of cash through the docks, however he is later murdered to tie up loose ends.
26	6	"Birdland"	Ernest Dickerson	Daniel Pyne	April 21, 2017
News explodes that the LAPD is investigating one of its own in a murder case. Bosch and Edgar are invited by Goshen to the deceased Jackson's home where stolen goods and cash are discovered. Bosch theorises that Dobbs and his crew are smuggling stolen money from the Middle East into the US and that Meadows was likely killed to prevent him from exposing their operation. Robertson and Pierce continue to investigate Gunn's murder. They discover that the woman who bailed out Gunn was Marissa Marta, Holland's personal secretary. When Robertson goes to question Marta he finds that she is with Holland's right hand man, Rudy Tefaro. Marta refuses to divulge any helpful information and Tafero advises Robertson to stay away from the case. Later Pierce and Robertson discover evidence that places Tafero's brother, Jessie, at the crime scene where Gunn was killed. However, in spite of this new evidence, Robertson suspects that Bosch is hiding something. Edgar discovers another disturbing link between Harry and a murder victim. Irving assists in the investigation of the "Koreatown Killer."
27	7	"Right Play"	Christine Moore	Jeffrey Fiskin	April 21, 2017
Bosch and Robertson arrest Jessie Tafero, an act which angers Rudy and worries Holland, who believes Jessie may have given damning information to the police. Woody is placed under surveillance and soon spots Edgar following him. Woody draws his gun and is shot dead by Edgar. In the aftermath of the shooting both Dobbs and Xavi disappear. Later on a fire is set at the retirement home where Detective John Caffrey, who worked on the murder of Bosch's mother, is living.
28	8	"Aye Papi"	Ernest Dickerson	Elle Johnson	April 21, 2017
John Caffrey is confirmed as a casualty in the River Watch retirement home fire. The Police step up their search for Dobbs and Xavi. With Bosch's reputation tarnished and no key witnesses, DA O'Shea pressures Benitez into accepting a plea deal. Bosch hands over the video footage from the night of Gunn's murder to a computer expert and asks him to make the recording untraceable. The recording, which shows Jessie Tafero entering Gunn's apartment on the night of Gunn's murder is then passed anonymously to Scott Anderson of the LA times, who in turn passes the information to Robertson. Later, despite Dobbs' request for Xavi to flee the country, Xavi shoots and seriously wounds Edgar out of revenge for killing Woody.
29	9	"Clear Shot"	Stephen Gyllenhaal	Eric Overmyer	April 21, 2017
Police officers begin a manhunt for Xavi in the aftermath of Edgar being shot. The police manage to persuade Rudy Tafero to flip on Andrew Holland by using the recording of his brother entering the apartment as leverage. Later Rudy wears a wire and manages to get Holland to admit his guilt on tape and Holland is arrested. Investigators visit Bosch and confirm that the River Watch fire was an act of arson and that Caffrey was likely the intended target. Irving embraces a lifelong goal. Xavi and Dobbs meet on Dobbs' boat with each other with each intending to kill the other one due to the recent events. Xavi hides a knife on the boat in preparation to kill Dobbs, however Dobbs gets the jump on Xavi and shoots him dead.
30	10	"The Sea King"	Ernest Dickerson	Daniel Pyne & Michael Connelly	April 21, 2017
Bosch pursues Dobbs to an island of the coast of California where Dobbs has hidden large amounts of money. A tense shootout occurs between the two where Bosch manages to capture Dobbs. Later, while in police custody Bosch visits Dobbs and (using Xavi's knife that was hidden on Dobbs' boat to link Dobbs to the murder of Xavi and Sharkey) lets Dobbs know he will pay for all his crimes. Edgar reveals that he knows Bosch sent in the recording causing friction between the two. Eleanor unexpectedly returns to LA and visits Bosch and Maddie; it is later revealed that Eleanor is working for the FBI. From evidence left behind by the deceased Caffey, Harry learns the real person who killed his mother was not Fox Mitchell, it was Mitchell's former friend Bradley Walker, the current president of the police commission.

=== Season 4 (2018) ===
No. overall	No. in season	Title	Directed by	Written by	Original release date
31	1	"Ask the Dust"	Aaron Lipstadt	John Mankiewicz & Daniel Pyne	April 13, 2018
High profile attorney Howard Elias is shot dead on the Angel's Flight railway. At the time of his death, Elias was taking a police brutality case to trial against the Robbery-Homicide Division in a case known as "Black Guardian." Elias' murder immediately attracts public attention, with the assumption that the murderer was a cop. Irving assembles a task force consisting of Bosch, Jimmy Robertson, and detectives Amy Snyder and Gabriella Lincoln. Bosch has the team begin searching for bullets. Bosch discovers Elias' cell phone on Angel's Flight tracks, with a text telling Elias to meet there.
32	2	"Dreams of Bunker Hill"	Aaron Lipstadt	John Mankiewicz & Daniel Pyne	April 13, 2018
Robertson discovers an affair between Elias and his jury consultant Pamela Duncan. Eleanor Wish becomes an FBI asset, playing high-stakes poker games to gather intel on Chinese nationals under investigation. At one such game, she witnesses an unknown man clear the players out so he can beat one of the men she was monitoring. Eleanor covertly films him with her phone.
33	3	"Devil in the House"	Alex Zakrzewski	Tom Bernardo	April 13, 2018
Elias' son Martin becomes a major suspect in his father's murder when his initial alibi is disproven. Millie sends Martin to the police station to provide his real alibi. Bosch suspects Millie sent Martin in deliberately so his bruised face would raise suspicions of police brutality and inflame the protesters. The defendants in the Black Guardian case, led by veteran detective Terry Drake, try to find out where the Elias murder investigation is leading. Robertson grapples with his own personal connection to the case, as Drake was his former partner and mentor. Another Black Guardian defendant, Detective Frank Sheehan, fears the murder will be pinned on him since he lacks an alibi. Bosch comes home late to find Sheehan at his house, drunkenly professing his innocence.
34	4	"Past Lives"	Tim Hunter	Shaz Bennett & Elle Johnson	April 13, 2018
Frank Sheehan admits his guilt in the Black Guardian case but reiterates his innocence of the Elias murder. Bosch lets him sleep on the couch. The next morning, Bosch discovers Sheehan has fled. With Sheehan on the run, he becomes the prime suspect in the Elias murder. Eleanor meets with Bosch for lunch, seeking parenting advice. As Eleanor returns to her car, two men ride by on a motorcycle and shoot her dead. With no other family left, a grieving Maddie moves in with Bosch.
35	5	"The Coping"	Alex Zakrzewski	Jeffrey Fiskin	April 13, 2018
Bosch flashes back to the day of his mother's murder and begins privately investigating Eleanor's shooting. The manhunt for Sheehan continues. Maddie asks to view her mother's body at the coroner's office, and Bosch reluctantly complies. Afterwards, Maddie ruminates that her last conversation with her mother was an argument, and Bosch reassures her, recounting his last conversation with Eleanor at her request.
36	6	"The Wine of Youth"	Zetna Fuentes	John Mankiewicz	April 13, 2018
Edgar traces a number on Eleanor's phone to Tiffany Hsu, a card dealer who was present the night Eleanor took the video. The Koreatown Killer is killed in a hit-and-run accident. Sheehan is spotted sneaking into his ex-wife's house, leading to a tense standoff. Bosch successfully talks a suicidal Sheehan into surrendering. A ballistics report confirms that the bullet found in Elias' body matches Sheehan's service weapon.
37	7	"Missed Connections"	Daisy von Scherler Mayer	Jeffrey Fiskin	April 13, 2018
Suspecting that Elias somehow acquired footage of the Black Guardian incident, Bosch investigates the junkyard bathroom where it took place and finds a hidden camera. Irving informs Walker that he has a suspect in the retirement home fire who may work for one of Walker's construction crews. Tiffany Hsu tells Edgar that the owner of the Golden Soup, the restaurant where Eleanor took her cell phone video, seemed familiar with the man from the video. Bosch looks into an old case where Sheehan fired his sidearm and finds the bullet missing from the property room. Reviewing the records, Bosch learns Amy Snyder had checked out the case file just days before.
38	8	"Dark Sky"	Ernest Dickerson	Elle Johnson	April 13, 2018
Bosch discovers that Lincoln checked out the old Sheehan case file using Snyder's name. Pierce discovers that the bullet that killed the railway operator does not match Sheehan's bullet. Maddie drives out to the desert, searching for the location where an old photo was taken of Eleanor and herself as an infant. Bosch and Edgar learn the man from the video is named Shuwei Chen. They meet with gang unit detective Gabriel Moy, who identifies a group of local hit men called the Baby Bandit Boys that Chen may have hired to carry out the shooting. As the three search a karaoke bar frequented by the hit men, two men resembling Eleanor's killers suddenly open fire. Moy kills one of them in the shootout, but the second man escapes from Bosch on a motorcycle.
39	9	"Rojo Profundo"	Neema Barnette	Michael Connelly	April 13, 2018
A manhunt commences for Eleanor's escaped shooter. Lincoln confesses to her involvement in the Elias case. Lincoln was involved in a conspiracy where she and Walker would secretly provide evidence to Elias in his cases and take a cut of the settlement. She claims Elias' decision to take Black Guardian to trial jeopardized Walker's career, as the source of the footage would be on record, and Walker murdered Elias personally to prevent this. With nothing but Lincoln's confession, O'Shea refuses to move forward with a case against Walker. Remembering that Walker had an alibi at the Biltmore hotel the night of the murder, Bosch returns to the Biltmore and discovers a backroom door leading to the underground tunnels and providing a secret passageway directly to Angel's Flight.
40	10	"Book of the Unclaimed Dead"	Ernest Dickerson	Daniel Pyne	April 13, 2018
The body of Eleanor's killer is found in the trunk of a car with Bosch's business card in his mouth. Bosch tries to stop Shuwei Chen from leaving the country, but the FBI force Bosch to let Chen go. Bosch reveals his suspicions that Griffin compromised Eleanor by relaying the photo she sent him to a Chinese intermediary. Bosch discovers a micro-SD card hidden inside a fake quarter in Elias' pocket change, with a video of Sheehan and Drake torturing a suspect. He turns over the card to Harris and Elias' assistant Kaplan to resume the trial. Bosch talks Walker into confessing to the murders of both Howard Elias and his mother. Bosch arrests Walker and takes Maddie out to the desert, where they spread Eleanor's ashes.

=== Season 5 (2019) ===
No. overall	No. in season	Title	Directed by	Written by	Original release date
41	1	"Two Kinds of Truth"	Alex Zakrzewski	Daniel Pyne	April 19, 2019
In a flash-forward, an undercover Bosch disembarks a plane at a remote desert compound, where he poses as one of several opiate addicts receiving pill rations from a crew of armed men. Bosch gets caught outside at night after spying on the crew, and their leader Walsh plays Russian roulette with a gun pointed at Bosch's head. Two weeks earlier, masked gunmen Hart and Stones break into a pharmacy run by Jose Esquivel and his son Jose Jr. The robbers execute the father and raid the shop for opiates. Officers Powers, Crate, and Barrel respond to the robbery, but a squad car collision let the robbers escape. Bosch and Edgar investigate the Esquivel murder and search for Jose Jr, who flees to his cousin Oscar's apartment. Meanwhile, Maddie informs Bosch that one of his old cases is being reopened: Preston Borders, convicted of raping and murdering Danielle Skylar in 1996, is attempting to overturn the conviction.
42	2	"Pill Shills"	Alex Zakrzewski	Eric Overmyer	April 19, 2019
Bosch and Edgar learn Esquivel Sr. was filing charges against a local clinic run by Dr. Garcia for over-prescribing oxycontin. Edgar contacts Gary Wise, an old CI, to put detectives Marcos and Arias in touch with his acquaintance Bo Jonas while investigating a drive-by shooting. Bosch learns his former partner and ex-girlfriend Christina Henry is spearheading the Borders appeal case. Honey Chandler learns the appeal is based on a deathbed confession by serial rapist Olmer, whose DNA was then found on a handkerchief in the Skylar case's evidence box.
43	3	"The Last Scrip"	Daisy von Scherler Mayer	Elle Johnson	April 19, 2019
The DA's office confirms that they are going forward with the Borders inquiry. Bosch visits retired detective Ryan Rodgers, who also worked the Skylar case, to retrieve old files. Maddie starts dating another intern. Edgar finds Gary Wise shot dead. Detective Pierce combs through security footage from the Esquivel pharmacy in the week before the robbery, finding a heated confrontation between Esquivel Sr. and Carter, the Garcia clinic's van driver. Esquivel Jr. sneaks back to Los Angeles to view his father's body.
44	4	"Raise the Dead"	Laura Belsey	Tom Bernardo	April 19, 2019
Bonner learns from Rita Tedesco that she and Borders are expecting a large payout soon. Robertson gets physical descriptions of Hart and Stones. Crate and Barrel blame each other for the crash. Bosch, undercover as a drug addicted vet, visits the VA hoping for a referral to the Garcia clinic, but is instead encouraged to join group therapy. There he meets Louis Degner and Elizabeth Clayton, both addicts involved with the clinic. Bosch learns that Elizabeth's addiction worsened after the unsolved murder of her daughter Daisy.
45	5	"Tunnel Vision"	Patrick Cady	Jeffrey Fiskin	April 19, 2019
Louis brings an undercover Bosch to the Garcia clinic and vouches for him. Edgar investigates a case from Gary Wise's past. Bonner reveals to Chandler and Bosch that Rita Tadesco was the stenographer at Borders' trial. Borders reveals his plan to ruin Bosch's life by overturning all of his cases once he's free. Jun encourages Irving to run for mayor. Irving destroys a key piece of evidence from the Borders case file.
46	6	"The Space Between the Stars"	Neema Barnette	Shaz Bennett	April 19, 2019
Bosch notices the missing evidence and questions Irving about the premature arrest he covered up. Barrel finally agrees to retire. Robertson's team discover Fentanyl residue in the garage where Hart and Stones were seen. Bosch returns to the Garcia clinic, where he joins a group of addicts in a van. Stones, chaperoning the van pool, brings Bosch and the other addicts to an airfield, where they board a private plane.
47	7	"The Wisdom of the Desert"	Aaron Lipstadt	Jeffrey Fiskin	April 19, 2019
Returning to the flash-forward from the season premiere, Bosch survives Walsh's Russian roulette game and Walsh's crew fly them back into town to fill prescriptions at another pharmacy. Edgar meets with Marcos and Arias, who suggest Bo Jonas may not be Wise's murderer. He learns that Marcos and Arias are in contact with Jacques Avrile, a Haitian war criminal turned CIA asset now living in Los Angeles. Pierce and Vega arrest Hart at Jose Jr's hideout in Bakersfield. Journalist Scott Anderson publishes a news story about Bosch and the Borders appeal based on leaked information.
48	8	"Salvation Mountain"	Ernest Dickerson	Tom Bernardo	April 19, 2019
Edgar identifies the location of Walsh's compound. The news article about Bosch blows his cover when Walsh's men see his face in the paper. Stones and Carter take Bosch on the private plane, intending to execute him, but Bosch is able to kill both men. Walsh and his remaining men narrowly escape the compound as the DEA raid it. Pierce and Vega nail Hart with DNA found on his ski mask from the pharmacy shooting. Maddie confronts her father about his reckless behavior during the undercover operation, reminding him that he's the only family she has left. Crate plans a surprise retirement party for Barrel. Bosch continues to work on the Borders appeal case.
49	9	"Hold Back the Night"	Aaron Lipstadt	Eric Overmyer	April 19, 2019
Pierce and Vega are called to investigate a suitcase full of severed limbs found by a dumpster. At the DA's office, Maddie sees a memo about the Borders case on Tom's desk and takes a picture of it. At Borders' habeas hearing Chandler reveals the Cronyns's conspiracy to frame Bosch. The judge subsequently rejects Borders' appeal entirely and has both of the Cronyns arrested. Bo Jonas claims he and Wise were ambushed by two Jamaican men who killed Gary. Edgar begins to suspect Marco and Arias and looks into their connection to Jacques Avrile. Tom figures out that Maddie copied his memo and breaks up with her. Maddie plans to move out of Bosch's home and go back to school.
50	10	"Creep Signed His Kill"	Ernest Dickerson	Daniel Pyne & Katie Pyne	April 19, 2019
Bosch confronts Irving about his evidence tampering in the Borders file. Irving confirms his own guilt while permanently burying the evidence. Barrel decides not to retire after all. Walsh and his last two men sneak into Bosch's house to assassinate him, but Bosch thwarts and kills all three in the ensuing shootout. Edgar confronts Marcos and Arias about their corruption and involvement with the Wise murder and the detectives reply with veiled threats, confirming his suspicions. Irving announces his run for mayor.

=== Season 6 (2020) ===
No. overall	No. in season	Title	Directed by	Written by	Original release date
51	1	"The Overlook"	Daisy von Scherler Mayer	Eric Overmyer & Tom Bernardo	April 16, 2020
Bosch's investigation of the cold case murder of Daisy Clayton is interrupted when he is called to investigate the murder of Stanley Kent, a medical physicist at St. Agatha's hospital. A welfare check on his wife Alicia finds her bound and gagged in their home, claiming masked men broke in. Security footage at the hospital reveals that Stanley retrieved 32 vials of cesium the night before, unaccounted for at the scene of the murder. FBI agents Brenner, Maxwell and Reece join the investigation, believing the perpetrators are planning to use the cesium for some kind of terrorist attack. Alicia's account of a tattoo on one attacker's wrist leads them to the 308, a group of radical sovereign citizens monitored by the FBI as potential terrorists. Irving plans his mayoral campaign, and learns that Jun is pregnant. When Bosch warns him of the potential terrorist plot, Irving has Jun leave town. Edgar investigates detectives Marcos and Arias for corruption, but Marcos spots his van during a stakeout. Marcos and Arias warn their Jamaican connections about the heat on them, and the Jamaicans murder both cops to sever their ties.
52	2	"Good People on Both Sides"	Alex Zakrzewski	Daniel Pyne	April 16, 2020
The FBI and LAPD grapple over the Kent case, with the FBI agents focused on finding the cesium while the detectives try to solve the murder. Agent Maxwell identifies 308 affiliate Travis Strout as a possible suspect through his CI Ben Craver. Bosch and Edgar approach Strout and his brother Walon at their home, but the brothers become aggravated when the FBI prematurely join the detectives, leading to a shootout in which Maxwell kills Travis and Officer Powers receives a career-ending injury. Weapons are found in the Strout home, but nothing conclusively linking the 308 to the Kent murder or the cesium. Ben Craver is later found murdered in his apartment. Travis' widow Heather believes her husband was deliberately assassinated by the government. Irving works to keep the news of a possible terrorist threat under wraps while planning his mayoral campaign. Edgar learns that Gary Wise's father Dwight has been privately investigating detectives Marcos, Arias and Jacques Avril.
53	3	"Three Widows"	Patrick Cady	Shaz Bennett	April 16, 2020
Interning for Honey Chandler, Maddie brings her information leading to a potentially lucrative new case. Edgar connects with DEA agent Hovan to put him in touch with his Jamaican CI Winston, who Edgar suspects was involved in the murders of Marcos, Arias and Gary Wise. Bosch and Edgar investigate a homeless immigrant suffering severe burns and discover the cesium stashed in his campsite, confirming that it was never in the possession of Kent's killers and putting an end to the terrorist alert. Heather goes into hiding with another 308 member and begins plotting to retaliate for her husband's death. Hitting dead ends with the 308 organization, Bosch investigates alternative angles. Through Kent's phone records, he learns that Kent had hired a private investigator to spy on Alicia, suspecting infidelity. Bosch begins to consider Alicia Kent as a suspect.
54	4	"Part of the Deal"	Michael McDonough	Tom Bernardo	April 16, 2020
Bosch scrutinizes the Kent marriage, learning of financial strain between the couple and a prenuptial agreement granting Stanley half of Alicia's independent wealth contingent on a morals clause. He also discovers a discrepancy between the placement of a robe in Alicia's hostage photo and its location when she was found. He successfully negotiates a warrant from Judge Sobel to monitor and wiretap Alicia for 72 hours. Agent Hovan goes undercover as a drug dealer to meet with Avril about a money laundering scheme, but is buffered by Avril's right-hand man Remy Toussaint. While out drinking with Barrel, Ryan Rodgers suffers a near-fatal heart attack. Maddie introduces her father to her new boyfriend Antonio. Bosch reconnects with a sober Elizabeth Clayton, who calls him after seeing an old friend of Daisy's outside of her workplace, believing he might provide a lead in the murder. Still haunted by the case, Bosch runs the plates Elizabeth recorded and identifies the man as Alex Sands.
55	5	"Money, Honey"	Trey Batchelor	Jeffrey Fiskin & Katie Pyne	April 16, 2020
Bosch talks to Alex Sands, who describes Daisy Clayton talking to a man in a white van the last time he saw her. Dwight Wise continues investigating Avril and his men against Edgar's wishes, spotting a shady repair garage run by Remy Toussaint. Impressed by the undercover Hovan, Toussaint brings him to meet with Avril personally. Irving marries Jun. Crate and Barrel investigate a turf war between two panhandlers that turned fatal. Barrel is shocked to learn that a hospitalized Ryan Rodgers died from a second heart attack. With time running out for the warrant to monitor Alicia Kent, Edgar searches footage on a hidden camera Stanley had set up in his own home to monitor Alicia. Under the pretense of retrieving her husband's belongings, Billets asks Alicia to come to the station. There, Bosch questions her about the discrepancy in the hostage photo, stalling for time until Edgar finds footage of Alicia roaming freely in her house during the time window when she was supposedly tied up. Alicia asks for a lawyer, and Honey Chandler arrives to represent her.
56	6	"The Ace Hotel"	Zetna Fuentes	Alex Meenehan	April 16, 2020
After counseling with Chandler, Alicia Kent seeks a plea deal for a two-year prison sentence, admitting to a conspiracy to scam her husband into violating their morals clause by stealing the cesium, but denying any involvement with his killing. She reveals her lover to be Agent Maxwell, blaming her husband's death entirely on him. The police pursue Maxwell and Agent Reece, his partner, ends up shooting him dead. Bosch's investigation of the Daisy Clayton murder leads to Roy, Elizabeth's boyfriend at the time. Questioning Roy, he learns that Daisy and Alex Sands were running a scheme together where Daisy would meet with pedophile johns and Sands would videotape them for blackmail material. Bosch returns to Sands, who says he deleted the video files, but still provides Bosch with the laptop where he stored them. Vega vents to Pierce about her discomfort with Billets' habit of touching her subordinates' shoulders. Pierce advises Vega to confront Billets herself. Walon Strout is released from jail once cleared for involvement in the Kent case. Inflamed by Travis' death and the FBI's own involvement in the Kent murder, the 308 begin constructing a bomb.
57	7	"Hard Feelings"	Hagar Ben-Asher	Jeffrey Fiskin	April 16, 2020
Bosch and Edgar locate an audio recording of Alicia taking initiative in plotting her husband's murder, which could compromise her plea deal if Chandler can't suppress it in court. Uncomfortable with her personal connection to the Alicia Kent case, Maddie resigns from Chandler's office. At Ryan Rodgers' memorial party, his daughter Melissa chastises Irving for overworking her father. She provides Barrel with a cassette tape her father left behind, asking him to identify its contents. Barrel discovers a 1996 recording that implicates Irving in the coverup of the former police chief's involvement in a drive-by shooting. Pierce goes to Captain Cooper, informing him of Vega's complaints about Billets. Cooper calls in Vega, who downplays her discomfort and refuses to file a complaint. Pursuing a personal vendetta against Billets for a past grievance, Cooper decides to file a sexual harassment complaint on Vega's behalf. Edgar and Hovan put more pressure on Martin, who deliberately blow's Hovan's cover to Avril. Bosch brings Sands' laptop to a technician to retrieve the lost video files, and speaks to former detective Brent Charles about the "backseat butcher", a serial killer whose M.O. resembled Daisy's killing. A partial fingerprint proved that it was a copycat, but Daisy's crime scene included details known only to members of Charles' task force, all of whom were cleared.
58	8	"Copy Cat"	Ernest Dickerson	Eric Overmyer & Alex Meenehan	April 16, 2020
Alicia Kent's trial is delayed when Chandler appeals to have the audio recording and wiretap material thrown out. With public focus on the homeless epidemic, Irving spearheads an inter-departmental initiative targeting homelessness. Ryan Rodgers' daughter leaks the cassette to Scott Anderson, who unsuccessfully attempts to blackmail Irving into securing him a position in his administration. Billets, Vega and Pierce all receive emails about the sexual harassment complaint filed by Cooper. All three try to dissuade Cooper, who nonetheless brings the matter to IA. Dwight Wise walks into Avril's hideout to confront him over the death of his son. With Hovan's cover blown, Edgar's investigation into Avril hits a dead end. Suspicious of Martin and seeking to insulate himself, Avril meets with Edgar and names Martin and Marvel as the Marcos and Arias shooters. Bosch retrieves Sands' video files and reaches a breakthrough when one of the blackmailed johns is identified as Roger Dillon, a crime scene cleaner who worked one of the backseat butcher scenes. Driving by Dillon's garage, Bosch sees a white van parked on the property.
59	9	"Dark Sacred Night"	Tara Nicole Weyr	Daniel Pyne & Osokwe Vasquez	April 16, 2020
Bosch visits Elizabeth to tell her he's found a likely suspect in her daughter's murder, but finds her drunk. IA looks into the sexual harassment complaint against Billets, but it backfires on Cooper when the investigator finds the complaint frivolous and looks into Cooper's agenda against her. Anderson gives the cassette tape to Irving's rival Jack Killoran, who blackmails him into dropping out of the mayoral race. Bosch gets a partial match between Roger Dillon's print and one found at Daisy's crime scene, securing a warrant to raid Dillon's business. Chains and a mattress are found in Dillon's van, as well as numerous young girls' school IDs, including Daisy's. Dillon is arrested, but denies killing any of the girls except Daisy. He explains that he delivers the girls to a human trafficking ring, and demands a reduced sentence for giving up the traffickers. Bosch explains the situation to Elizabeth, who is crestfallen. Jacques Avril wears a wire while meeting with Martin and Marvel, successfully manipulating them into overtly admitting the murders of Marcos and Arias. Both Jamaicans are arrested while Avril walks free. Dwight Wise is unsatisfied that Avril has still evaded justice himself, and Edgar pledges to continue pursuing Avril. Later, Remy Toussaint murders Dwight outside his home.
60	10	"Some Measure of Justice"	Ernest Dickerson	Michael Connelly	April 16, 2020
Roger Dillon's information leads to the bust of a human trafficking ring in which three young girls are rescued. In exchange for the information, Dillon cuts a deal for a manslaughter charge, claiming Daisy's killing was self defense. Bosch disconnects the camera in the interview room and terrorizes Dillon before leaving. Checking up on Elizabeth, he finds her dead from an overdose. Irving abruptly drops out of the mayoral race, backing candidate Lopez rather than Killoran. Infuriated by Dwight's murder, Edgar privately stakes out Avril's house and witnesses Toussaint breaking into Avril's backdoor, following him in. Billets later informs Bosch that Edgar was involved in a shooting where both Avril and Toussaint were killed. Edgar claims Avril murdered Toussaint and he shot Avril in self defense. His story clears questioning, but Bosch suspects the shooting was deliberate and warns Edgar it was the wrong move. As the Alicia Kent trial commences, Heather Strout conspires with other 308 members to smuggle a bomb into the courtroom. Barrel identifies the bomb threat and the courtroom is cleared as Bosch disposes of the bomb, preventing any casualties in the explosion. Suspecting Heather has a second bomb, Bosch warns Agent Reece that she may be approaching the FBI headquarters. Heather is successfully arrested en route. Alicia Kent is eventually convicted of conspiracy to murder her husband. Bosch, the sole attendee of Elizabeth Clayton's funeral, sees her buried next to her daughter in a family plot.

=== Season 7 (2021) ===
No. overall	No. in season	Title	Directed by	Written by	Original release date
61	1	"Brazen"	Alex Zakrzewski	Eric Overmyer	June 25, 2021
New Year's Eve 2019. While Los Angeles celebrates, a fire breaks out in an East Hollywood apartment building killing several residents—including a ten-year-old girl who was delivering fresh homemade tamales to neighbours. When it's determined to be arson, Detective Harry Bosch arrives on the scene but his partner, Detective Jerry Edgar, is noticeably absent.
62	2	"The Dog You Feed"	Patrick Cady	Osokwe Vasquez	June 25, 2021
Bosch and Edgar's probe of the arson fire takes them to the Magic Castle. Billets unwittingly causes discord among a few junior officers. Chandler's new client, Vincent Franzen, spends a night in lockup—but proposes delivering a far bigger financial criminal in exchange for his release.
63	3	"Sabes Demasiado"	Alex Zakrzewski	Jeffrey Fiskin	June 25, 2021
Edgar's continuing mental struggle over the Avril shooting compels Bosch to bring Vega aboard as they hunt "La Mayorista," the woman and drug lord they believe was the real power behind the arson fire. With Maddie's assistance, Chandler prepares Franzen to testify to the Securities and Exchange Commission and secures Franzen in a safe house. Chief Irving and Mayor Lopez discuss the arson case—and try to keep each other's agendas hidden. Irving also worries about his prematurely-born son.
64	4	"Triple Play"	Patrick Cady	Lolis Eric Elie	June 25, 2021
Bosch is called to a double homicide, and discovers Franzen and his girlfriend murdered, not to mention RHD detective Jimmy Robertson also on scene. Not long after, Maddie finds Chandler shot and bleeding heavily in her home. Billets knows the two officers who've been harassing her relentlessly, but she angers Capt. Cooper and Lt. Thorne when she takes it to Internal Affairs before taking it to them. As the hunt for the hit man ramps up, Bosch and Edgar try to question Alvarez.
65	5	"Jury's Still Out"	Alex Zakrzewski	Benjamin Pitts	June 25, 2021
Bosch discovers Alvarez is transferred to federal custody and asks Irving for help. Pierce and Vega get leads on the hitman. Billets reaches out to a former Hollywood division officer for information on Leonard and Norris, the two patrolmen harassing her endlessly. Bosch and Edgar's meeting with financier Carl Rogers hits a dangerous snag when Edgar inadvertently exposes Maddie as the witness for Franzen, prompting Rogers' scheming lawyer Fowwkes to hire a hitman.
66	6	"The Greater Good"	Patrick Cady	Alex Meenehan & Jessica Kivnik	June 25, 2021
Rogers' hitman arrives in LA and kills Fowwkes to remove a loose end. The hitman forces Judge Donna Sobel, Bosch's girlfriend, into letting him into the courthouse and kills her before attempting to kill Maddie. The resulting shootout between the assassin and Bosch, Robertson and Edgar results in the assassin's death. Assistant DA Tegan Boyle is identified as a mole for Fowwkes and arrested. Maddie testifies to a grand jury to ensure her safety. Irving asks for FBI help with Alvarez, learning something useful about Peña, the actual apartment fire starter. The little tamale girl’s father pays Bosch a visit; his pain strengthens Bosch’s resolve to bring her killers to justice. Leonard and Norris push Billets to the brink.
67	7	"Workaround"	Alex Zakrzewski	Elle Johnson & Mitzi Roberts	June 25, 2021
Urged to make neighborhood security checks by Cooper, Billets visits a jewelry shop whose owner she doesn't yet know is a longtime friend and ally of Cooper. Robertson and Bennett trace the hitman to a Las Vegas-based mobster. They find connections to other clients of Fowwkes. Chandler remains in critical condition in the hospital. After she is reported to IA by the jewelry store owner, Billets is able to expose Cooper, Leonard, and Norris for conspiracy and corruption, and all three are arrested. Irving orders Bosch to let Peña go and give up trying to tie him to the fire.
68	8	"Por Sonia"	Patrick Cady	Michael Connelly & Eric Overmyer	June 25, 2021
Billets posts new assignments for the soon-to-be-closed Hollywood homicide division and lowers a final boom on Leonard, Norris, Cooper, and Thorne. Irving promotes Billets to captain. Bosch intends to arrest Peña regardless of the Feds. Chandler wakes up from her coma. Still reeling from Chandler's shooting, Maddie decides to apply to the LAPD. Irving suspends Bosch for trying to arrest Peña. Immediately after Peña is released, he is shot to death in front of the police station by the little tamale girl's father, who is then killed by the police. Enraged, Bosch turns in his badge and ponder his own future away from the LAPD.

Notes

1.	A different version of the pilot was available on January 14, 2015, prior to the rest of the first season.
