= Homeland Security (film) =

2004 American made-for-television film

- Title screen
- Genre: Drama
- Written by: Christopher Crowe
- Directed by: Daniel Sackheim
- Starring: Scott Glenn; Tom Skerritt; Grant Show; Marisol Nichols; Kal Penn; Ross Gibby; Leland Orser
- Music by: Scott Gilman
- Country of origin: United States
- Original language: English

Production
- Executive producers: Christopher Crowe; Kerry McCluggage
- Producers: Ron Binkowski; Clayton Townsend
- Cinematography: Jonathan Freeman
- Editor: Regis Kimble
- Running time: 98 minutes
- Production companies: Craftsman Films; Crowe Entertainment; Paramount Network Television

Original release
- Network: NBC
- Release: April 11, 2004

Homeland Security is a 2004 American television drama film about the creation of the United States Department of Homeland Security in response to the September 11 attacks. It was directed by Daniel Sackheim, written by Christopher Crowe, and stars Scott Glenn and Tom Skerritt. Originally produced for NBC as a pilot for a series that never materialized, it instead aired on NBC as a stand-alone film on April 11, 2004.

== Plot ==
Admiral Theodore McKee is retired, when following the events of 9/11 he receives a call from the White House informing him that his commander in chief requires him to serve his country once again. Shortly after this he is sworn into office as a senior member of the Office of Homeland Security (OHS) under Tom Ridge. Once in office Admiral McKee faces the challenge of organizing this new office so as to prevent further terrorist attacks against the United States. With this in mind Admiral McKee's wife, Elise, recommends he speak to his friend, NSA agent Sol Binder.

Following a meeting with Binder, McKee recruits him into OHS. After which Binder comes up with a plan for the new agency, all law enforcement agencies within the United States will have to put their rivalries aside and funnel all intelligence into the OHS. We first meet Binder at the beginning of the film prior to the events of 9/11, where he is meeting with a group of NSA agents with intelligence on a planned terrorist attack that is to take place in the United States where the number Nine and Eleven keep popping up, it is not until the day of the attacks that Binder was able to piece it together. It is Binder's belief that had there been a cooperative organization such as the OHS, the attacks could have been averted.

While the main concern of the film is the establishment of the OHS, which following Congress' approval would become the Department of Homeland Security (DHS), there are a number of subplots, out of chronological sequence, involved in the film. Such subplots include the invasion of Afghanistan, use of precision-guided air strikes with weapons such as GPS-guided JDAMs, the Customs agent on the Canadian border stopping the vehicle carrying explosives for the attempted Millennium bombing, the pursuit of Osama bin Laden and the destruction of Al'Qaeda training camps in the Middle East, as well as in the beginning of the film. Admiral McKee's daughter, Melissa, is due to leave New Jersey for San Francisco on September 11, 2001, on United Airlines Flight 93. Following hearing an announcement on the news that United Airlines Flight 93 was hijacked and has gone down over Pennsylvania, the Admiral and his wife are distraught; shortly thereafter she contacts her parents to tell them she was late and had fortunately missed her flight.

That is not all Melissa saw that day. After the Pentagon was attacked, military command had received the executive order to investigate various aircraft that were off course, including Melissa's later flight, and to shoot down any that failed to comply with visual command. In a fictional engagement, three military jets engage the airliner, setting off the near collision alarm, one positioning itself in front of the airliner, another to the left. The nervous jet pilot behind the airliner nearly shoots it down before the airliner pilots comply with visual command and respond. The jet pilot is ordered to stand down, take a deep breath, and escort the airliner to O'Hare International Airport in Chicago, where Melissa first vigorously demands to know if they had almost been shot down. From a pay phone, Melissa called her parents and her boyfriend. Melissa demands from her mother, "Who is doing this to us?"

== Cast ==
- Scott Glenn as Joe Johnson
- Tom Skerritt as Admiral Theodore McKee
- Andrew Robinson as Senator
- Grant Show as Bradley Brand
- Marisol Nichols as Jane Fulbar
- Kal Penn as Harrison
- Ross Gibby as Frank Heinhoff
- Leland Orser as Sol Binder
- Stephi Lineburg as Melissa McKee
- Beth Broderick as Elise McKee
- Nicholas Guilak as Saif Khan
- Glenn Morshower as General Eaton
- Al Faris as Dr. Adel
- Christopher Maher as Hamid Karzai
- Vahe Bejan as Brushenko
- Alex Dodd as Achmed
- Sayed Badreya as Jamaitja
- Reynaldo Rosales as Tom

== Production ==
NBC picked up the pilot in January 2003. Filming took place in Los Angeles.

== Reception ==
The film was poorly received and was cancelled even before it started as a TV show. As one review said "And don't be fooled by names like Tom Skerritt and Scott Glenn; Homeland Security is a bland and fairly tasteless bullet-point history lesson on how the 9/11 attacks happened, how a bunch of generic TV characters deal with it, and how many soaring musical strains can be employed while the rah-rah chest-thumping speechifying goes on in front of a flapping American flag." (DVDtalk.com)

== Home release ==
Region 1	Region 2
August 23, 2005	N/A

== See also ==
- September 11, 2001 attacks
- Flight 93 (TV film)
- United 93 (film)
- World Trade Center (film)
