= Bosch (TV series) =

American drama television series

- Genre: Detective fiction; Drama
- Based on: Harry Bosch novel series by Michael Connelly
- Developed by: Eric Overmyer
- Starring: Titus Welliver; Jamie Hector; Amy Aquino; Lance Reddick; Annie Wersching; Sarah Clarke; Jason Gedrick; Madison Lintz; Jeri Ryan; Brent Sexton; Mimi Rogers; Paul Calderón
- Music by: Jesse Voccia
- Opening theme: "Can't Let Go" by Caught a Ghost
- Country of origin: United States
- Original language: English
- No. of seasons: 7
- No. of episodes: 68 (list of episodes)

Production
- Executive producers: Henrik Bastin; Pieter Jan Brugge; Michael Connelly; Eric Overmyer; Titus Welliver; Daniel Pyne; Elle Johnson; Jan David Frouman; Henrik Pabst; Mikkel Bondesen; John Mankiewicz; James Baker
- Producers: James D. Boscadin; Mark Douglas; Tom Bernardo; Titus Welliver; T.L. Lankford; Patrick McKee; Rachel Rusch; Jim Mckay
- Cinematography: Eric Alan Edwards
- Running time: 39–80 minutes
- Production companies: Hieronymus Pictures; Fabrik Entertainment; Amazon Studios

Original release
- Network: Amazon Prime Video
- Release: February 6, 2014 – June 25, 2021

Related
- Bosch: Legacy; Ballard

Bosch is an American police procedural television series produced by Amazon Studios and Fabrik Entertainment starring Titus Welliver as Los Angeles Police Department detective Harry Bosch. The show was developed for Amazon by Eric Overmyer, and the first season takes its inspiration from the Michael Connelly novels City of Bones (2002), Echo Park (2006), and The Concrete Blonde (1994). It was one of two drama pilots that Amazon streamed online in early 2014 (together with The After), and viewers offered their opinions on it before the studio decided whether to place a series order. The seventh and final season was released on June 25, 2021.

Two spin-off series have been produced and a third has been announced. Bosch: Legacy, a sequel series described by Welliver as "essentially Bosch season 8", premiered on May 6, 2022 on Amazon Freevee. Two additional seasons were released on Prime Video, the second of which premiered on October 20, 2023, the third and final on March 27, 2025. The second spinoff follows Detective Renée Ballard, whom Connelly introduced in the 2017 novel The Late Show. An upcoming prequel series for MGM+, Bosch: Start of Watch, focuses a younger Bosch (Cameron Monaghan) at the start of his career with the LAPD.

== Plot ==
Season	Episodes		Originally released
1	10	1	February 6, 2014
1	10	9	February 13, 2015
2	10		March 11, 2016
3	10		April 21, 2017
4	10		April 13, 2018
5	10		April 19, 2019
6	10		April 16, 2020
7	8		June 25, 2021

=== Season 1 ===
Based on The Concrete Blonde (Book 3), City of Bones (Book 8), and Echo Park (Book 12)

The first season follows LAPD detective Harry Bosch (Titus Welliver) as he investigates two cases. The first is the murder of a 12-year-old boy whose bones were found in the Hollywood Hills. During this period, Bosch is being tried for shooting a suspect in self-defense, and faces a civil lawsuit from the suspect's widow. As Bosch pursues the truth in both cases, he crosses paths with Raynard Waits (Jason Gedrick), a serial killer who claims to be the boy's killer and has a personal interest in Bosch. Bosch must deal with the challenges of his job, his past, and his personal life, while trying to bring justice to the victims.

=== Season 2 ===
Based on The Last Coyote (Book 4) and Trunk Music (Book 5), Beginning case and major character death based on The Drop (Book 15)

Six months after the events in Season 1, Bosch returns from a suspension. He investigates the murder of a Hollywood producer who appears to have mob connections. His investigation of the producer sends him to Las Vegas, where he also finds out that all is not well with his teenage daughter and ex-wife. Bosch's investigation almost threatens the life of his family, as he is also brought into another case that leads to a ring of dirty cops. New evidence appears on the homicide of his late mother decades earlier. He investigates the circumstances that led to her murder.

=== Season 3 ===
Based on The Black Echo (Book 1), and A Darkness More Than Night (Book 7)

Sixteen months later. Bosch is haunted with new leads to pursue on his mother's murder case. The season opens with a graffiti-tagging street teen being in the vicinity where a homeless veteran, Billy Meadows, is murdered. Bosch is identified as a suspect in the recent murder of Ed Gunn (a person who fits the MO of his mother's killer), and is doggedly pursued by veteran detective Jimmy Robertson.

Concurrently, Bosch is monitoring an ongoing criminal trial involving a powerful Hollywood movie mogul who is under house arrest. The director employs for his security a former 20+ year police detective, who proves to be a meddlesome and worthy adversary against Bosch and LAPD.

Bosch's personal life takes on new challenges. His teenage daughter, Maddie, is living in LA with him. He also has started a romantic relationship with a deputy DA. A serial murderer known as the Koreatown Killer (KTK) is introduced to the series.

=== Season 4 ===
Based on Angels Flight (Book 6), major character death based on Nine Dragons (Book 14), Bosch's mother's killer's apprehension based on The Last Coyote (Book 4)

Three months later. Civil rights attorney Howard Elias is representing a black man who is accusing the LAPD of police brutality, but Elias is murdered. Elias had a history of representing citizens who sue the LAPD. His homicide unleashes racial strife in LA and elevates tension between the LAPD and citizens.

Police Chief Irving assigns Bosch to head the task force to get to the bottom of the Elias murder and assigns a pair of IA investigators to watch Bosch's team, which includes Edgar, Robertson, and Robertson's detective trainee. Bosch's ex-wife, an FBI agent, is pursuing a gang of Chinese nationals, one of whom is under a US investigation. As a result of her work, she is murdered in a drive-by shooting, just seconds after having lunch with Harry. Bosch gains a vital clue into his mother's murder after the long-retired detective of his mother's case is killed.

=== Season 5 ===
Based on Two Kinds of Truth (Book 20)

Fifteen months later. A murder conviction is brought into question from an old case Bosch worked, possibly affecting other past convictions and endangering his career. An embittered former girlfriend accuses Bosch of planting evidence and believes a claim of new DNA evidence purporting to tie another criminal to the crime. Bosch hires former foe Honey ("Money") Chandler to defend him against charges of planting evidence.

Bosch and his partner Jerry Edgar are investigating the murder of a pharmacist who has, through his son, been involved in dispensing opiates. During their investigation they determine there is a significant opiate-dealing network, possibly controlled by Russian and Armenian gangsters. Bosch goes undercover to learn more about their organization.

Maddie Bosch works as an intern in the LA DA's office. A young attorney mentions a case against her father. Maddie observes bad intent from the CIU investigator, Bosch's former girlfriend, and relays her suspicions to her dad.

Chief Irving is frustrated by Bosch's lack of communication about the murder, the old case with newly discovered evidence, and his undercover work. Lt. Billets covers nicely for Bosch, risking her own position as leader of the Hollywood bureau. Irving is approached by Mayor Vargas's political consultant with the news that he could be a serious contender in the next mayoral election.

=== Season 6 ===
Based on The Overlook (Book 13), and Dark Sacred Night (Book 21)

Eleven months later. After a medical physicist is murdered and the deadly radioactive material he had with him goes missing, Detective Harry Bosch finds himself at the center of a complex murder case, a messy federal investigation, and a possibly catastrophic threat to Los Angeles—the city he has pledged to serve and protect.

=== Season 7 ===
Based on The Burning Room (Book 17)

Four months later, New Year's Eve 12/31/19. When a ten-year-old girl dies in an arson fire, Detective Harry Bosch risks everything to bring her killer to justice despite opposition from powerful forces. Detective Jerry Edgar falls apart as he grapples with the consequences of shooting Jacques Avril. Maddie assists Honey Chandler on a high-profile case that draws Bosch in and puts them in the crosshairs of dangerous criminals.

== Production ==
Amazon Studios announced on October 31, 2013, that Bosch had been given the green light for production. The hour-long pilot stars Titus Welliver as Harry Bosch, and co-stars Annie Wersching, Amy Aquino, and Jamie Hector. Henrik Bastin of Fabrik Entertainment was the producer, and Jim McKay directed.

According to Connelly, "a fair [number] of changes" were made "to the world of Harry Bosch" "in making the shift from page to screen." In the television series set in 2013, Harry "is 47 years old and a veteran of the first Gulf War in 1991," when he was a member of a Special Forces team clearing tunnels. In the books, Harry was born in 1950, and his tunnel-rat expertise was gained in the Vietnam War. Television Bosch "has now been a police officer for twenty years, with a one-year exception when he re-upped with the Army after 9/11, as many LAPD officers did. He came back to the force after serving in Afghanistan and again encountering tunnel warfare." Book Bosch was also an experienced police detective, but his break from the force came from an Internal Affairs investigation. The show prominently features Bosch's 14-year-old daughter "Maddie" (Madeline).

On November 4, 2013, the 13-day shoot began in Los Angeles, while Connelly kept a daily set journal.

The pilot premiered on Amazon Prime in February 2014, allowing customers to vote to decide whether or not more episodes should be made. In March 2014, Amazon announced that they had commissioned Bosch for a full series.

All ten episodes of the first season of Bosch were released for viewing on Amazon Video on February 13, 2015. Portions of the first episode were changed from the pilot. This included reverting the name of the civil rights attorney character from the pilot (where Amy Price-Francis played Sunny Chandler) back to the book name of Honey Chandler and recasting the role to Mimi Rogers. Also a scene was added in which Bosch testifies in court and is questioned about his background by Chandler.

On March 18, 2015, Bosch was renewed for a second season.

On July 16, the series was nominated for the Outstanding Main Title Design award at the 67th Primetime Creative Arts Emmy Awards, along with Manhattan, American Horror Story: Freak Show, Daredevil, Halt and Catch Fire, and Olive Kitteridge; the award was won by Manhattan.

On April 1, 2016, Bosch was renewed for a third season. On October 16, 2016, Bosch was renewed for a fourth season. On February 13, 2018, Bosch was renewed for a fifth season. On November 14, 2018, Bosch was renewed for a sixth season.

On February 13, 2020, the series was renewed for a seventh and final season. The filming for the final season began in September 2020, before wrapping up in January 2021.

== Cast ==
=== Main cast ===
- Titus Welliver as Los Angeles Police Department Detective III Hieronymus "Harry" Bosch, a former Army Special Forces operator and a veteran of the First Gulf War and Afghanistan, who works in the Hollywood homicide division. He is an astute detective with a fundamental respect for rules and policy, though still something of a renegade. Welliver's son Quinn plays adolescent Harry in flashbacks.
- Jamie Hector as Detective II Jerome Edgar ("Jerry"; "J. Edgar"), Bosch's partner
- Amy Aquino as Lieutenant II Grace Billets, Bosch's immediate superior and friend
- Lance Reddick as assistant chief, then deputy chief, later Chief of Police Irvin Irving
- Annie Wersching (season 1; guest seasons 2 & 7) as Police Officer I Julia Brasher, a rookie cop assigned to the Hollywood Division. She becomes romantically involved with Bosch but comes into conflict with him when he realizes that she makes up the rules as she goes along
- Jason Gedrick (season 1) as Raynard Waits, a serial killer and the suspect in the death of a boy whose bones are found in Laurel Canyon
- Sarah Clarke (seasons 1–2 & 4; guest season 3) as Eleanor Wish, Harry's ex-wife with whom he still has a cordial relationship. She is a former FBI agent turned professional poker player.
- Madison Lintz (seasons 2–7; recurring season 1) as Madeline "Maddie" Bosch, Harry and Eleanor's daughter
- Jeri Ryan (season 2; featured season 3; guest season 5) as Veronica Allen, a manipulative former porn star married to an Armenian porn producer, whose husband is murdered
- Brent Sexton (season 2) as Carl Nash, a former LAPD homicide detective who oversees a team of corrupt police officers while working as a security guard at a gated community
- Mimi Rogers (season 7; recurring seasons 1, 4–6, guest season 2–3) as Honey "Money" Chandler, a civil rights attorney
- Paul Calderón (season 7; recurring seasons 3–5) as Detective II Santiago "Jimmy" Robertson, a seasoned detective investigating the murder of a vet who has a history with Harry

=== Recurring cast ===
- Steven Culp as Richard (Rick) O'Shea, the politically ambitious district attorney of Los Angeles County (seasons 1–4)
- Gregory Scott Cummins as Detective II Robert Moore ("Crate"), Barrel's longtime friend and partner
- Troy Evans as Detective II Johnson ("Barrel"), a senior homicide detective at Hollywood Division
- Scott Klace as Sergeant II John "Mank" Mankiewicz, assistant watch commander at Hollywood Division
- DaJuan Johnson as Police Officer III, later Detective I Rondell Pierce
- Jacqueline Obradors as Detective Christina Vega (seasons 5–7)
- Deji LaRay as Police Officer III, later Sergeant I Julius Edgewood
- Eric Ladin as Scott Anderson, a reporter for the Los Angeles Times (seasons 3, 5–7)
- Bess Armstrong as Judge Donna Sobel (seasons 5–7)
- Mark Herrier as Captain III Dennis Cooper (seasons 5–7)
- Jason Sims-Prewitt as Police Officer Victor Rhodes
- Joni Bovill as Ida, assistant to Chief of Police Irvin Irving

==== Season 1 ====
- Katharine Leonard as Marjorie Lowe, shown in flashbacks as Harry's deceased mother. She was a prostitute found murdered in an alley
- Abraham Benrubi as Rodney Belk, a lawyer who represented Bosch at his trial (seasons 1, 7)
- Veronica Cartwright as Irene Saxon, Raynard Waits' mother
- Mark Derwin as Captain Harvey Pounds (seasons 1, 7)
- Shawn Hatosy as Johnny Stokes
- Robbie Jones as Officer George Irving, Deputy Chief Irving's son, a rookie cop later assigned to undercover narcotics (seasons 1–2)
- Adam O'Byrne as Nate Tyler, an aggressive Los Angeles Times reporter
- Paul Vincent O'Connor as Judge Alan M. Keyes, a judge who presided at Bosch's trial.
- Rose Rollins as Detective Kizmin Rider
- Alan Rosenberg as Dr. William Golliher (seasons 1, 7), a forensic anthropologist who assisted Bosch with the identification of the bones
- Scott Wilson as Dr. Paul Guyot, a retired doctor whose dog found bones of a missing boy
- Michelle Hurd (season 1) and Erika Alexander (seasons 2–3) as Connie Irving, Deputy Chief Irving's wife and Officer George Irving's mother, who later divorces Irving believing that he caused their son's death by allowing him to go undercover
- Kirk Bovill as Harry's foster father in flashbacks during his childhood

==== Season 2 ====
- Yancey Arias as Los Angeles Mayor Hector Ramos (seasons 2–4, 6)
- Ingrid Rogers as Latonya Edgar, Jerry's ex-wife (seasons 2-)
- Hoon Lee as Reggie Woo, Eleanor's husband and Maddie's stepfather who is currently in Hong Kong (seasons 2, 4)
- John Marshall Jones as FBI Special Agent Jay Griffin (seasons 2–4)
- Ryan Ahern as Officer Ray Powers (seasons 2-)
- Matthew Lillard as Luke "Lucky" Rykov, an FBI agent with whom Harry works on two cases (seasons 2–3, 7)
- David Marciano as Detective Brad Conniff, investigates the death of Officer Irving (seasons 2–3, 5–6)
- Leisha Hailey as Officer Maureen (Mo) O'Grady, a cop in Nash's ring
- James Ransone as Officer Eddie Arceneaux, Irving's partner and a cop in Nash's ring
- Emilia Zoryan as Layla, the stage name of a dancer at Dolly's in Las Vegas, Nevada, and mysterious girlfriend to an Armenian porn producer who is murdered.
- Christopher Cousins as Martin Weiss, an attorney to one of the Armenian mobsters involved in the case
- Michael Yebba as Mike, an enforcer for the Armenian mob in Las Vegas

==== Season 3 ====
- Winter Ave Zoli as Detective Amy Snyder, Internal Affairs (seasons 3–4)
- Barry Shabaka Henley as Detective Terry Drake (seasons 3–4)
- John Getz as Bradley Walker, president of the Police Commission (seasons 3–4)
- Linda Park as Jun Park, the crisis response team volunteer who starts a relationship with Chief Irving after his wife leaves him. (seasons 3-)
- Verona Blue as Shaz, bartender at The Smog Cutter (seasons 3–5)
- Monti Sharp as Clifton Campbell, perpetrator of the Koreatown Killer (KTK) murders (season 3–4)
- John Ales as Andrew Holland, a movie writer/director accused of murder
- Max Arciniega as Xavi Moreno, a sniper who is part of Dobbs' team
- Christopher Backus as Woody Woodrow, part of Dobbs' team
- Beth Broderick as Judge Sharon Houghton
- Frank Clem as Ed Gunn
- Spencer Garrett as Fowkkes, Andrew Holland's high-powered attorney (seasons 3, 7)
- Jeffrey Pierce as Trevor Dobbs, leader of a team of former military men transiting illicit cargo through the Port of Los Angeles
- Brooke Smith as Captain Ellen Lewis, Hollywood Station
- Paola Turbay as Deputy District Attorney Anita Benitez, who is trying the Holland case, and has a brief relationship with Harry
- Jared Ward as Jesse Tafero, Rudy's younger brother and helper
- Arnold Vosloo as Rudy Tafero, an investigator working for the defense on the Holland case
- Bridger Zadina as Sharkey, a young street boy who is key to one of Harry's cases

==== Season 4 ====
- Clark Johnson as Howard Elias, civil rights attorney who was murdered aboard the Angels Flight two days before the "Black Guardian" case
- Tamberla Perry as Detective Gabriella Lincoln
- Anne Dudek as Pamela Duncan, legal advisor and lover of Howard Elias
- Jamie McShane as Detective Francis Sheehan, a detective with Robbery-Homicide Division
- Louis Ozawa Changchien as FBI Special Agent Chuck Deng
- Anna Diop as Desiree Zealy, a young activist who has a disdain for the police
- Sara Arrington as Margaret Sheehan, estranged wife of Francis Sheehan
- Deidrie Henry as Millie Elias, wife of Howard Elias
- Quincy Fouse as Martin Elias, son of Howard Elias
- David Hoflin as Detective Doug Rooker
- Keston John as Michael Harris, suspect in the abduction and murder of Stacey Kincaid. After being found not guilty of the murder, he retained Howard Elias to sue the city of Los Angeles for police brutality from his interrogation by the LAPD.
- Kristen Ariza as Laura Cooke, reporter (seasons 4, 6)
- Leonard Wu as Shiwei Chen
- Jason Rogel as Det. Jeremy Fix

==== Season 5 ====
- Ryan Hurst as Hector Bonner, a former client of attorney Honey Chandler, currently working as her investigator.
- Mason Dye as Tom Galligan
- Judith Moreland as DA Cheryl Hines (seasons 5, 7)
- M. C. Gainey as Ryan Rodgers (seasons 5–6)
- Bianca Kajlich as DA Investigator Christina Henry
- Chris Browning as Preston Borders
- Juliet Landau as Rita Tedesco
- Jon Lindstrom as Lance Cronyn
- Avery Clyde as Kathy Zelden
- Doug Simpson as Terry Spencer
- Chris Vance as Dalton Walsh
- Jamie Anne Allman as Elizabeth Clayton (seasons 5–6)
- C. Thomas Howell as Louis Degner
- Yani Gellman as Jose Esquivel Jr.
- Kevin Sifuentes as Jose Esquivel Sr.
- Rene Moran as Oscar Pineto
- Celestino Cornielle as Charlie Hovan (seasons 5–6)
- Kwame Patterson as Gary Wise
- Sam Meader as Sean Terrion (seasons 5–6)
- Mark Adair-Rios as DDA Kennedy (seasons 5–6)
- Richard Brooks as Dwight Wise (seasons 5–6)
- Treva Etienne as Jacques Avril (seasons 5–6)
- Wilmer Calderon as Detective Daniel Arias (seasons 5–6)
- Al Vicente as Detective Ray Marcos (seasons 5–6)

==== Season 6 ====
- Kovar McClure as Dr. Stanley Kent
- Lynn Collins as Alicia Kent
- Julie Ann Emery as FBI Agent Sylvia Reece (seasons 6–7)
- Adam J. Harrington as FBI SAC Jack Brenner (seasons 6–7)
- Carter MacIntyre as FBI Agent Clifford Maxwell
- Abby Brammell as Heather Strout
- Kevin Will as Waylon Strout
- Chris Payne Gilbert as Travis Strout
- Leith M. Burke as Charlie Dax
- Mary-Bonner Baker as DDA Hannah Blair
- Benjamin Burt as Ben Craver
- Jon Fletcher as Alex Sands
- Tzi Ma as Brent Charles
- Ashton Holmes as Roger Dillon
- Jonny Rios as Antonio Valens
- D. W. Moffett as Jack Killoran
- Mitchell Fink as Ray Thacker
- Bambadjan Bamba as Remi Toussaint
- Brian D. Mason as Winston
- Terrence Terrell as Marvel

== Episodes ==
Season	Episodes		Originally released
1	10	1	February 6, 2014
1	10	9	February 13, 2015
2	10		March 11, 2016
3	10		April 21, 2017
4	10		April 13, 2018
5	10		April 19, 2019
6	10		April 16, 2020
7	8		June 25, 2021

== Home media ==
In Australia (Region 4), the first four seasons have been released on DVD and distributed by Universal Sony Pictures Home Entertainment Australia Pty Limited.

Home media releases of Bosch, with release dates
DVD title	Region 4
Season 1	October 8, 2015
Season 2	July 20, 2016
Season 3	January 10, 2018
Season 4	January 16, 2019
Season 5	TBA
Season 6	TBA
Season 7	TBA

== Reception ==
=== Critical response ===
On Rotten Tomatoes, the first season has a rating of 83% based on 30 reviews, with an average rating of 7.1/10. The site's critics' consensus reads: "An uneven boilerplate police drama is sharpened by gritty atmosphere, solid acting, and some rousing, suspenseful turns." On Metacritic, the season has a weighted average score of 71 out of 100, based on 17 critics, indicating "generally favorable reviews".

Cory Barker of TV.com wrote that the series is "rock-solid and generally enjoyable without ever making much of an attempt to push boundaries," and praised Amazon Studios for "producing a show based on a book that somehow reproduces the experience of reading." Neil Genzlinger of The New York Times wrote that the series is part of a long "list of brooding, taciturn small-screen police detectives," yet Bosch "proves gripping" due to good "plotting and pacing". Noel Murray of The A.V. Club remarked that "the best thing about Bosch is how well it captures Connelly's Los Angeles," while noting that "the series' biggest stumbling block is that it's stubbornly slow-paced". Brian Lowry of Variety wrote that "the series has the texture and tone of an old-fashioned detective yarn," but "the transition from page to screen… proves too talky in places and clunky in others". Hank Stuever of The Washington Post called Welliver's performance "nicely built out of smirks and smolders". Brian Moylan of The Guardian praised the "film noir" feeling of the show and considered it a step above NCIS, but he did not like the similarities to many other police shows, calling the series "samey".

On Rotten Tomatoes, season two has an approval rating of 100% based on 14 reviews, with an average rating of 7.67/10. The site's critical consensus reads: "Bosch hones its pulpy strengths in a superlative sophomore season, executing its procedural formula with a no-nonsense panache that befits its title character." On Metacritic, the season has a weighted average score of 76 out of 100, based on 7 critics, indicating "generally favorable reviews". Season three has an approval rating of 100% based on 10 reviews, with an average rating of 8/10. The critical consensus reads: "Bosch's third season maintains the series' mastery over mystery, deftly interweaving story strands as sprawling as a Los Angeles intersection." Season four also holds an approval rating of 100% based on 10 reviews, with an average rating of 8/10. The critics' consensus reads: "Bosch continues its steady thrills in a fourth season that successfully navigates topical controversies." Seasons five, six and seven hold approval ratings of 100% (based on 6, 11 and 8 reviews respectively).

=== Accolades ===
List of awards and nominations for Bosch
Year	Award	Category	Nominee(s)	Result	Ref.
2015	67th Primetime Emmy Awards	Outstanding Main Title Design	Grant Lau, creative director; JJ Gerber, creative producer; Michael Radtke, editor; Rod Basham, flame artist	Nominated	
2015	42nd Saturn Awards	Best Supporting Actor on Television	Lance Reddick	Nominated	
2015	42nd Saturn Awards	Best New Media Television Series	Bosch	Nominated	
2016	43rd Saturn Awards	Best New Media Television Series	Bosch	Nominated	

== Spin-offs ==
=== Bosch: Legacy ===
Titus Welliver reprises his role as Harry Bosch in the Amazon Freevee series Bosch: Legacy. It was ordered by Amazon's advertising-supported streaming service in March 2021. Madison Lintz returns as Harry's daughter, Maddie, and Bosch recurring character defense attorney Honey "Money" Chandler, played by Mimi Rogers, is also a main character. Bosch, now retired from the LAPD, works as an investigator for Chandler, while Maddie joins the LAPD. The series is produced by Welliver, Erik Overmyer, Henrik Bastin, Pieter Jan Brugge, and writer Michael Connelly, all of whom produced Bosch. The series began filming in June 2021 in Los Angeles.

In November 2021, the series' title, Bosch: Legacy was announced. In March 2022, it was announced that the series would premiere on May 6, 2022. In May 2022, the series was renewed for a second season; further, in May 2023, it was renewed for a third season, which was released in March 2025.

=== Ballard ===
On November 15, 2023, another spinoff was announced, centered around Michael Connelly's character Detective Renée Ballard investigating cold cases. On March 21, 2024, it was announced that Maggie Q had been cast as Detective Renée Ballard. Maggie Q makes her first appearance as the titular character of Ballard in the finale of season three of Bosch: Legacy.

In May 2025, the series' title, Ballard, was announced. The series premiered on July 9, 2025. It was renewed for a second season in October 2025.

=== Bosch: Start of Watch ===
In October 2025, MGM+ ordered Bosch: Start of Watch, a prequel series focusing on a young Bosch played by Cameron Monaghan. The series is set to premiere on January 10, 2027.
