= Clayton Townsend =

American film producer

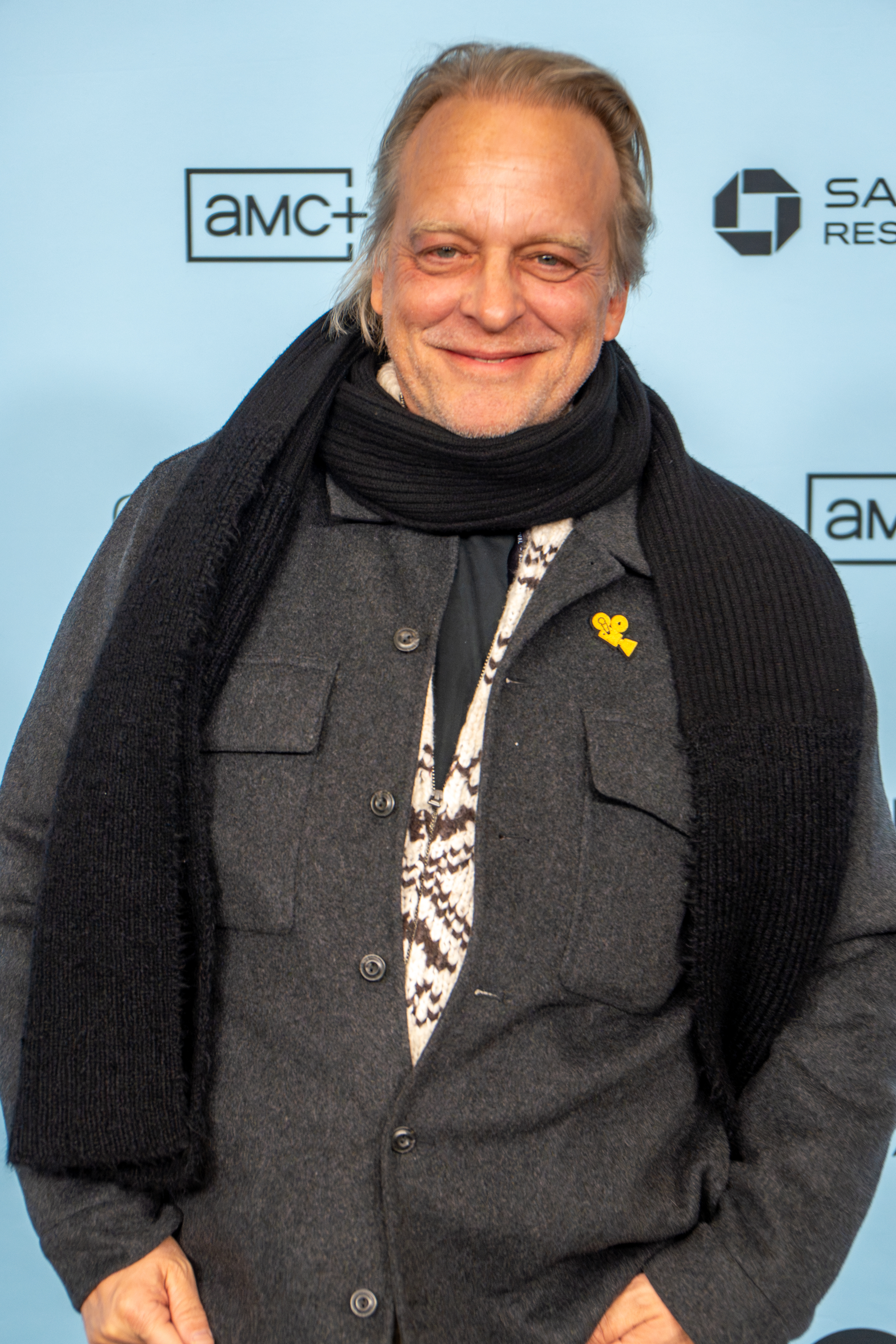
- Clayton Townsend in 2025
- Born: February 9, 1961 (age 65); Cleveland, Ohio, U.S.
- Occupations: Film producer, Television producer, Production manager
- Years active: 1979–present
- Notable work: Born on the Fourth of July; Natural Born Killers; Any Given Sunday; Bad Company; Bridesmaids

Clayton Townsend (born February 9, 1961) is an American film producer, television producer and production manager. Between 1988 and 1999, he collaborated intensively with director Oliver Stone as (co-)producer and associate producer. Notable movies from that period are Born on the Fourth of July (1989), Natural Born Killers (1994) and Any Given Sunday (1999). Other notable producer achievements are Abel Ferrara's The Blackout (1997) and Where's Marlowe? (1998), directed by Daniel Pyne. He also served as an executive producer on the MGM comedy Heartbreakers (2001), directed by David Mirkin, and on Bad Company (2002), from director Joel Schumacher. In addition to feature films, Townsend has produced several television pilots for Paramount Television, including the 2004 television film Homeland Security.

In 1990, Townsend won the Directors Guild of America Award for Outstanding Directorial Achievement in Motion Pictures for the film Born on the Fourth of July. He shared this award with Oliver Stone. In 2012, Clayton was nominated for the Producers Guild of America Award as Outstanding Producer of Theatrical Motion Pictures for Bridesmaids. Since 1992, he is president of Itinerant Film Corporation, a private production company based in Los Angeles.

== Selected filmography ==
=== Feature films ===
Producer

- Born on the Fourth of July (1989, associate producer)
- Natural Born Killers (1994)
- Nixon (1995)
- The Blackout (1997)
- U Turn (1997)
- Where's Marlowe? (1998)
- Any Given Sunday (1999)
- The 40-Year-Old Virgin (2005)
- Knocked Up (2007)
- Walk Hard: The Dewey Cox Story (2007)
- Year One (2009)
- Funny People (2009)
- Bridesmaids (2011)
- People Like Us (2012)
- This Is 40 (2012)
- Fast & Furious 6 (2013)
- Unbroken (2014)
- Zoolander 2 (2016)
- Bird Box (2018)
- Holmes & Watson (2018)
- F9 (2021)
- The Equalizer 3 (2023)
- Last Days (2025)

Executive producer

- Heartbreakers (2001)
- Bad Company (2002)
- The Skeleton Key (2005)
- The Fast and the Furious: Tokyo Drift (2006)

=== Television ===
- Homeland Security (2004, pilot episode)
- Sleepy Hollow (2013, pilot episode)
- Scorpion (2014, 1 episode)
- Ripley (2024, 8 episodes)
