= Where's Marlowe? =

- Directed by: Daniel Pyne
- Written by: John Mankiewicz; Daniel Pyne
- Produced by: Clayton Townsend
- Starring: Miguel Ferrer; Mos Def; John Livingston; John Slattery
- Cinematography: Greg Gardiner
- Edited by: Les Butler
- Music by: Michael Convertino
- Production company: Sandblast
- Distributed by: Paramount Classics
- Release dates: October 1, 1998 (Mill Valley Film Festival); November 12, 1999 (United States)
- Running time: 97 minutes
- Country: United States
- Language: English

Where's Marlowe? is a 1998 American mockumentary mystery black comedy film written by Daniel Pyne and John Mankiewicz. Daniel Pyne also directed the film, which stars Miguel Ferrer, Mos Def, John Slattery, and John Livingston.

== Plot ==
After making a three-hour fiasco about New York City's water supply, a two-man film crew decides to take it up a notch by documenting life in the private investigator offices of "Boone and Murphy". Cheating husbands and missing dogs fail to bring in the big bucks however, and after sleeping with the wife of one of their clients Murphy leaves. To stop Boone from having to close down the business the two film-makers must resort to a hands-on approach in the investigations to ensure the completion of their movie.

== Cast ==
- Miguel Ferrer as Joe Boone
- John Livingston as A.J. Edison
- Mos Def as Wilt Crawley
- John Slattery as Kevin Murphy
- Allison Dean as Angela
- Clayton Rohner as Sonny "Beep" Collins
- Elizabeth Schofield as Monica Collins
- Barbara Howard as Emma Huffington
- Miguel Sandoval as Skip Pfeiffer
- Bill McKinney as Uncle Bill
- Lisa Jane Persky as Jenny
- Nicki Micheaux as Caroline
- Kamala Lopez as Penny
- Wendy Benson-Landers as Heather
- Sarabeth Tucek as Rikki
- Olivia Rosewood as Stacy / Fawn
- John Hawkes as Earl
- David Newsom as Jake Pierson
- Kirk Baltz as Rivers
- Ken Jenkins as Linguist
- Wendy Crewson as Dr. Ninki Bregman
- Erich Anderson as Detective Simmons
- Alexandra Bokyun Chun as Detective Hsu
- Joyce Guy as Wilt's Mom
- Patrick Egan as A.J.'s Dad
- Connie Sawyer as Skip's Mom
- Brent Jennings as Funeral Director
- Don Keith Opper as The Composer
- Brent Roam as Angry Man
- Heather McComb as Trophy Wife
- Julia Kruis as Beautiful Woman
- Giancarlo Esposito as Blind Man (uncredited)
