= White Sands (film) =

1992 American film by Roger Donaldson

- Theatrical release poster
- Directed by: Roger Donaldson
- Written by: Daniel Pyne
- Produced by: William Sackheim; Scott Rudin
- Starring: Willem Dafoe; Mary Elizabeth Mastrantonio; Mickey Rourke
- Cinematography: Peter Menzies Jr.
- Edited by: Nicholas Beauman
- Music by: Patrick O'Hearn
- Production company: Morgan Creek Productions
- Distributed by: Warner Bros.
- Release date: April 24, 1992
- Running time: 101 minutes
- Country: United States
- Language: English
- Budget: $22 million
- Box office: $18 million

White Sands is a 1992 American crime thriller film directed by Roger Donaldson, written by Daniel Pyne, and starring Willem Dafoe, Mary Elizabeth Mastrantonio, Samuel L. Jackson and Mickey Rourke. The neo-noir and neo-Western film follows Ray Dolezal (Dafoe), a deputy sheriff in rural New Mexico who finds a body in the desert with a suitcase containing $500,000. He impersonates the dead man and stumbles into an FBI investigation.

White Sands was produced by Morgan Creek Productions, and was released in the United States on April 24, 1992, by Warner Bros. It received mixed reviews and grossed $18 million worldwide against a budget of $22 million.

== Plot ==
In New Mexico, Torrance County deputy sheriff Ray Dolezal investigates an apparent suicide in the desert. Alongside the body of Bob Spencer is a suitcase containing $500,000. During the autopsy, authorities find a digested piece of paper with a phone number; Dolezal, posing as Spencer, calls the number and goes to a meeting, where he is robbed and instructed to meet gunrunner Gorman Lennox at a restaurant. FBI agent Greg Meeker intercepts Dolezal and informs him that Spencer was an undercover agent. Now that Dolezal has lost the money, Meeker suggests he continue posing as Spencer to recover the money or help arrest Lennox.

Dolezal meets Lennox and his wealthy associate Lane Bodine and learns the money is to arm left-wing freedom fighters in South America. The arms dealers demo the guns for Dolezal and Lennox but demand an additional $250,000 due to unforeseen expenses. Meeker pushes the responsibility on Dolezal, who romances his way into Lane's life so she will attract rich humanitarian donors to fund the deal. Two FBI internal affairs agents, Flynn and Demott, suspect Dolezal of killing Spencer and stealing the money. Dolezal is forced to admit to Lane he is not really Spencer, but she agrees to help raise the money because she finds Dolezal a better alternative to the volatile Lennox.

Dolezal learns from Noreen, who had an affair with the real Spencer, that he was working with an FBI agent who likely killed him. Noreen runs away at the sight of Meeker, and the internal affairs agents grab Dolezal. Lennox runs the agents off the road; Dolezal flees and returns to Lane. He discovers Noreen shot dead and a Polaroid of her with Spencer and Meeker.

Dolezal breaks into a surveillance van outside Lane's house and beats up the FBI agent. He accuses Meeker of killing Spencer and Noreen. Meeker admits he took the $500,000 without authorization to steal it and capture Lennox at the same time, but Spencer lost his nerve and wanted out. Meeker confronted him out in the desert and convinced him to shoot himself. He tells Dolezal the Polaroid proves nothing, and no one will believe his word against that of a minority agent with a spotless record.

Lennox meets Dolezal and reveals Flynn and Demott tied up in the trunk of his car. They drive into the desert, where Lennox says he knows Dolezal is not Spencer, because Lennox is really a CIA agent who wants the arms deal to go through, ensuring the survival of the military–industrial complex. Lennox kills Flynn and Demott and informs Dolezal that he has Lane hostage. Dolezal must find where she hid the $250,000 and meet Lennox on a deserted military base in the White Sands desert.

Dolezal uncovers the money in a briefcase buried in Lane's horse's stall. He kidnaps Meeker, takes him to White Sands, and handcuffs him to a pipe inside an abandoned building. Dolezal explains that Lennox is CIA, the FBI will be arriving soon, and Meeker can either face punishment or try to flee. Dolezal leaves a gun behind, so Meeker grabs it and hides inside a bathroom stall.

Lennox arrives and reveals that Lane is waiting at the base entrance, and asks where his money is located. Dolezal tells him the briefcase is in the abandoned building, but when Lennox walks in, Meeker shoots and kills him. After disabling Lennox's car, Dolezal picks up Lane. He drops her off at her estate and explains that he needs to return to his family. He hands her the $250,000 she had obtained through her pseudo-fund raising event, and then drives away.

Before the FBI arrives, Meeker breaks the pipe he was cuffed to and runs through the desert with the briefcase. Dolezal left the original $500,000 he was suspected of stealing in the trunk of Lennox's car so the FBI would stop investigating him. One of the agents notices footprints going out into White Sands, and they head off in pursuit. As the FBI catches up with him, Meeker stumbles and drops the briefcase which breaks open, revealing it contains nothing but sand. Dolezal is seen driving home, a free man.

== Cast ==
- Willem Dafoe as Ray Dolezal
- Mary Elizabeth Mastrantonio as Lane Bodine
- Mickey Rourke as Gorman Lennox
- Samuel L. Jackson as Greg Meeker
- M. Emmet Walsh as Bert Gibson
- James Rebhorn as Agent Flynn
- Maura Tierney as Noreen
- Beth Grant as Roz Kincaid
- Alexander Nicksay as Ben Dolezal
- Fredrick Lopez as Delmar Blackwater
- Miguel Sandoval as Ruiz
- John Lafayette as Agent Demott
- Ken Thorley as Harold Kleinman
- Jack Kehler as Casanov
- Royce D. Applegate as Peterson
- Megan Butler as Goodman
- Lisa Cloud as Redhead
- Steve Cormier as Artie O'Brien/Bob Spencer
- Mimi Rogers as Molly Dolezal (uncredited)
- Fred Thompson as Arms Dealer (uncredited)
- John P. Ryan as Arms Dealer #2 (uncredited)

== Production ==
Filming took place on location primarily in and around the cities of Estancia, Santa Fe, Taos, and Alamogordo in New Mexico during the fall of 1991. Additional filming took place at Garson Studios on the campus of Santa Fe University of Art and Design and White Sands National Park.

== Reception ==
On Rotten Tomatoes, 47% of 17 critics reviews were positive, and the average rating was 5.10/10. Metacritic assigned the film a weighted average score of 46 out of 100, based on 22 critics, indicating "mixed or average reviews". Audiences polled by CinemaScore gave the film an average grade of "B−" on an A+ to F scale.

Peter Travers of Rolling Stone wrote that the storyline was both predictable and, when Gorman Lennox (Mickey Rourke) is revealed to be a CIA agent, utterly confusing. Desson Howe of The Washington Post wrote that it is never really explained why Willem Dafoe's character Ray Dolezal has an obsession to find out the truth about Bob Spencer (Artie Cormier)'s death, or the various other unexplained oddities that occur in the film, such as the fact that Lane Bodine (Mary Elizabeth Mastrantonio) falls in love with Dafoe's character for no apparent reason. Leonard Maltin gave the film two stars and called it "competently performed (even by Rourke) but with little else to distinguish it from dozens of its ilk”.

The film grossed $9 million in the United States and Canada and $18 million worldwide.

Writer Daniel Pyne called it "a very complex, dark thriller set in the Southwest. Well-received, but not really — it was too challenging; it was too much. I got complaints from people that it was too hard to read. It took them two hours; they wanted to be able to read it in forty-five minutes by their pool."

== Home media ==
The film is available on DVD with English and French language and subtitle options, and includes trailers as well as filmographies of some of the cast members, both for this film and for a few other films produced by Morgan Creek. It was released on Blu-ray from Sony Pictures Home Entertainment on April 23, 2019.
