= Any Given Sunday =

1999 American sports drama film by Oliver Stone

- Theatrical release poster
- Directed by: Oliver Stone
- Screenplay by: John Logan; Oliver Stone
- Story by: Daniel Pyne; John Logan
- Based on: On Any Given Sunday; 1984 novel by Pat Toomay
- Produced by: Lauren Shuler Donner; Dan Halsted; Clayton Townsend
- Starring: Al Pacino; Cameron Diaz; Dennis Quaid; James Woods; Jamie Foxx; LL Cool J; Matthew Modine; Charlton Heston; Ann-Margret; Aaron Eckhart; John C. McGinley
- Cinematography: Salvatore Totino
- Edited by: Stuart Levy; Thomas J. Nordberg; Keith Salmon; Stuart Waks
- Music by: Robbie Robertson; Paul Kelly; Richard Horowitz
- Production companies: The Donners' Company; Ixtlan Productions
- Distributed by: Warner Bros. Pictures
- Release date: December 22, 1999
- Running time: 162 minutes
- Country: United States
- Language: English
- Budget: $55 million
- Box office: $100.2 million

Any Given Sunday is a 1999 American sports drama film directed by Oliver Stone and produced by Clayton Townsend, Dan Halsted, and Lauren Shuler Donner from a screenplay by Stone and John Logan based on a story written by Logan and Daniel Pyne, with Stone and Richard Donner additionally serving as executive producers. The film depicts a fictional professional American football team. It features an ensemble cast that includes Al Pacino, Cameron Diaz, Dennis Quaid, Jamie Foxx, James Woods, LL Cool J, Ann-Margret, Lauren Holly, Matthew Modine, John C. McGinley, Charlton Heston, Bill Bellamy, Lela Rochon, Aaron Eckhart, Elizabeth Berkley, and NFL players Jim Brown and Lawrence Taylor.

The film is partly based on the 1984 novel On Any Given Sunday by NFL defensive end Pat Toomay; the title is derived from a line in the book (also used in the film), that a team can win or lose on "any given Sunday", said by the fictitious coach Tony D'Amato. The quote was originally derived from a statement made in 1952 by then-NFL commissioner Bert Bell, about the league's devotion to financial and competitive parity. Cameo roles also feature many former American football players, including Dick Butkus, Y. A. Tittle, Pat Toomay, Warren Moon, Johnny Unitas, Ricky Watters, Emmitt Smith and Terrell Owens, as well as coach Barry Switzer.

Any Given Sunday was released on December 22, 1999 by Warner Bros. Pictures. The film received mixed reviews from critics and grossed $100.2 million against a $55 million budget.

== Plot ==
The Miami Sharks, an American football team, are struggling to make the 2001 Affiliated Football Franchises of America (AFFA) playoffs. The team is coached by thirty-year veteran Tony D'Amato, who has fallen out of favor with young team owner Christina Pagniacci, and his offensive coordinator Nick Crozier, Tony's expected successor.

In the thirteenth game of the season, both the starting quarterback Jack "Cap" Rooney and second-string quarterback Tyler Cherubini are injured and forced to leave the field. The desperate Sharks call on third-string quarterback Willie Beamen to enter the game. While a nervous Willie makes a number of errors and fails to win the game for the Sharks, he plays well and gains confidence. Cap vows to make it back by the playoffs, with the coach promising not to give up on him.

The following day, Tony and Christina argue about the direction of the team. The owner accepts Crozier's progressiveness, and choses to eventually cut Cap. Tony insists that Christina's late father, the previous owner, would never have meddled in his coaching plans.

During the next game, to Tony's chagrin, Willie disregards the team's conservative offense and changes plays in the huddle. As the media hails Willie as the next model of quarterback, the newfound success feeds his growing narcissism and leads to tension with teammates and coaches. During a confrontation with the quarterback, Tony demotes him to the bench.

After Willie gives an interview in which he takes sole credit for the Sharks' winning streak, the other players refuse to perform for him and consequently lose a home game. After Willie is involved in a brawl with running back Julian "J-Man" Washington, an irate Tony expresses his embarrassment at his team before leaving. Willie thinks about his behavior and amends his ways.

As the playoffs arrive, Sharks middle linebacker Luther "Shark" Lavay reminds Willie about how lucky he is to be in the league, and to find a life outside of football; his words fall on deaf ears. Tony worsens his relationship with Christina and berates Cap for second-guessing his availability. Before the game, Tony gives a rousing speech urging team unity that Willie takes to heart and energizes the rest of the team. Cap returns as starting quarterback but is injured with a concussion after scoring a touchdown.

Cap allows D'Amato to let Beamen finish the game. Subsequently, Pagniacci enters the locker room to demand that D'Amato play Beamen. After she and D'Amato argue, Beamen informs her that he had already been told that he would start the second half. Beamen apologizes to his teammates for his actions and leads the team to win. In a post-game talk with D'Amato, Beamen dedicates the next game to Rooney, but admits that he is worried about his ongoing health.

The Sharks eventually lose the championship (the Pantheon Cup) to San Francisco. At D'Amato's final press conference as head coach, he is thanked by Pagniacci. D'Amato is expected to announce his retirement, but he instead drops two bombshells, announcing that he has been hired as head coach and general manager of an expansion team in New Mexico, the Albuquerque Aztecs, and that he has signed Willie Beamen to be his starting quarterback and franchise player.

== Cast ==
- Al Pacino as Tony D'Amato, head coach of the Miami Sharks. Having held his position for decades and been given much autonomy by the team's owner, "Tony D" is respected for great successes, including two Pantheon Cups, the championship for this (fictional) professional football league. He devoted so much time to the team that he became estranged from his wife and children. Tony's traditional methods have come under fire from management and the media for recent failures, including missing the playoffs. Bitter that he was never promoted to general manager, Tony resents the hands-on "interference" of Christina Pagniacci, who succeeded her late father Artie as team owner. His last name comes from boxing trainer Constantine "Cus" D'Amato.
- Cameron Diaz as Christina Pagniacci, owner and general manager. She inherited the team from her father and boasts a Cornell MBA. She attributes the team's disappointments to Coach D'Amato's "old-school methods" and takes a more hands-on approach, bringing in innovative new offensive coordinator Nick Crozier as his eventual successor. She hints that Tony will not return after his contract expires, adding to his distractions. She also threatens to move the franchise if the city refuses to build a new stadium, causing a confrontation with the AFFA Commissioner and the Mayor of Miami.
- Dennis Quaid as Jack "Cap" Rooney, starting quarterback and team captain. Seen as being like a son to Coach D'Amato, the two have been credited with the team's greatest on-field successes. Cap is now an aging veteran who faces injuries and conflicts with team personnel. Owner Pagniacci wants to dump him. Relations have soured between Cap and wife Cindy (Lauren Holly), the latter of whom goads him without sympathy for his physical or mental situation, mercilessly browbeating him when he mentions retiring. Cap is injured during a game and is replaced, but is determined to make a comeback. Cap recovers for the first round of the playoffs, wherein he plays well until suffering a hard hit while scoring a touchdown before halftime.
- James Woods as Dr. Harvey Mandrake, the unscrupulous team physician. He risks serious injury to players for the team to have a better shot at winning, often at the direction of Christina. He is fired by Tony after his unethical methods are discovered by the conscientious team internist.
- Jamie Foxx as Willie "Steamin" Beamen, the third-string quarterback, out of the University of Houston. Willie has a history that has led him to distrust his coaches. In particular, while playing for San Diego, Willie was turned into a defensive secondary player for having "fast feet", and was eventually injured while making a tackle. He initially believes that racism played a major role in his history of being denied opportunities, using an alternative of "placeism" to describe a lack of African-American quarterbacks and head coaches in pro-football. Willie becomes the starter after injuries to Cap and the backup quarterback. Although surprisingly successful, Willie causes tension among staff and teammates. He frequently either changes the plays that the coach calls or calls his own. These acts create major tension with Tony. The coach respects Willie's athletic ability and acknowledges that his talents warrant him to be a quarterback, but heavily criticizes his lack of leadership skills and intangibles. He is granted his own music video, and asks owner Pagniacci for a date when she enters a postgame locker-room full of naked or partly-dressed players like himself. Willie's antics on and off the field eventually get him demoted to the bench by Tony, who firmly believes that a quarterback's most important role is to lead the team and help keep them confident, both for which Beamen took a clear disregard. Willie eventually matures and is inspired by Cap's gutsy performance in the Sharks' first playoff game.
- LL Cool J as Julian "J-Man" Washington, starting running back. He is very good but becomes increasingly angry at Willie for his cockiness and tendencies to take plays away from him. He is motivated by incentive clauses in his contract, and Tony refers to him as a "merc" (mercenary) "who will be gone before next season". Julian redeems himself to the team by running out of bounds to stop the play clock while his team was attempting an offensive drive with little time remaining.
- Ann-Margret as Margaret Pagniacci, Christina's mother and the widow of the Sharks' original owner Artie.
- Lauren Holly as Cindy Rooney, wife of Jack "Cap" Rooney. It is heavily implied that she is no more than a trophy wife, caring more for her wealth and social status than for her husband's health and well-being.
- Lawrence Taylor as Luther "Shark" Lavay, starting middle linebacker and the captain of the defense. He has a cortisone addiction and is nearing the twilight of a very successful career, but he is held in high esteem by Tony for "revolutionizing" his position by being highly skilled in both pass rushing and defending against the run. Mandrake has concealed that "Shark" is suffering from a previous injury, a broken neck that did not heal properly. If he suffers another serious hit, he may be permanently disabled, suffer from seizures, or killed. The team's internist informs him and D'Amato of the situation, but "Shark" says that he will lose a one-million-dollar bonus if he does not make his incentive stats (one sack and three tackles) or retire, as Powers suggests. He also has a confrontation with Beamen about the role of offense versus defense (which culminates with him cutting Beamen's Chevrolet Suburban in half with a circular saw during a party). While making a hit, Shark is knocked unconscious. He awakens and is hauled away on a stretcher, satisfied that he made his one-million-dollar bonus.
- Jim Brown as Monte "Montezuma" Monroe, defensive coordinator. He is vocal and brings intensity to the defense and to the team in general. A longtime friend of D'Amato, who personally confides in Montezuma several times. Monroe states at one point that he would like to return to high school coaching where the game is "pure".
- Aaron Eckhart as Nick Crozier, offensive coordinator. Nick is an offensive guru brought in from Minnesota by Christina Pagniacci. Young and tech-savvy (making use of a laptop computer while calling plays), he is highly critical of Tony's old-fashioned ways, as well as Beamen's changing the plays in the huddle and Julian's playing for contract incentives. Despite the tension, D'Amato recognizes Crozier's talent. He is named D'Amato's successor after the coach departs to lead an expansion franchise in New Mexico.
- Bill Bellamy as Jimmy Sanderson, the wide receiver who becomes Willie Beamen's first option on offense once he is moved into the starting Quarterback position, adding to the friction that is already building up between Willie and Julian.
- Matthew Modine as Dr. Ollie Powers, the team's internist. He discovers that Dr. Mandrake is covering for players who are suffering from near-career-ending injuries, but are overdosing on painkillers, steroids and hormones to cover the pain. Powers faces his own dilemma needing to relieve the players' pain versus prescribing too much medication at the insistence of the addicted players.
- John C. McGinley as Jack Rose, an abrasive and prominent sports reporter. On his cable show, Rose displays an incredible distaste for all things D'Amato. This leads to D'Amato physically assaulting Rose near the end of the regular season, but no charges are pressed after D'Amato makes a public apology. In spite of their rivalry (or even because of it), Rose confesses that he will miss D'Amato when he retires.
- Lela Rochon as Vanessa Struthers, longtime girlfriend of Willie Beamen who unsuccessfully tries to pressure him into marriage after being humiliated by Cindy Rooney in front of the other football wives.
- Elizabeth Berkley as Mandy Murphy, a high-priced escort who provides Tony with a girlfriend experience when he is feeling lonely.
- Clifton Davis as Mayor Tyrone Smalls, who is always a few steps ahead of Christina in her efforts to leverage him into using taxpayer money to build a new stadium for the Sharks.
- Andrew Bryniarski as Patrick "Madman" Kelly, a starting offensive tackle with violent tendencies, who at one point threatens a jeering fan.
- Charlton Heston as AFFA football commissioner.
- James Karen and Gianni Russo as Christina's advisors.
- Duane Martin as Willie's agent.
- Pat O'Hara as Tyler Cherubini, a journeyman quarterback who was initially second-string quarterback after "Cap" Rooney is injured, before being injured himself, leading to Willie Beamen's first game as quarterback.
- Mazio Royster as wide receiver.
- Rick Johnson as Dallas quarterback.
- Allan Graf as referee.
- Margaret Betts as mayor's aide.
- Lester Speight as Sharks' security guard.
- Eva Tamargo as Tunnel reporter, game 3.
- Delia Sheppard and Jaime Bergman as party girls.
- Dan Sileo as Dallas defensive tackle.
- Sean Stone as fan (as Sean C. Stone).
- Antoni Corone as fan

Cameos

- Dick Butkus
- Terrell Owens
- Ricky Watters
- Irving Fryar
- Joe Schmidt
- Oliver Stone
- Barry Switzer
- Y. A. Tittle
- Warren Moon
- Johnny Unitas
- Pat Toomay
- Emmitt Smith
- Wilt Chamberlain (uncredited)

== Fictional teams ==
Any Given Sunday was filmed in Miami, Florida, and Dallas, Texas. The Orange Bowl in Miami represents the home of the fictitious American football team, the Miami Sharks, and Texas Stadium is used for the home of the fictitious Dallas Knights. These and the other made-up teams and their league, Associated Football Franchises of America (AFFA), are based on the National Football League. The actual NFL teams and league names are trademarked.

At the end of the film, D'Amato laments to gathered media about his team's loss to San Francisco but does not reference their mascot. On the team schedule, the San Francisco Knights are mentioned, but this is likely a mistake because the Dallas team has that nickname. A team called the Pharaohs is mentioned during the Minnesota game without any city, so it is possible that they are the San Francisco Pharaohs.

- Miami Sharks
- Minnesota Americans
- Chicago Rhinos
- California Crusaders
- New York Emperors
- Dallas Knights
- Seattle Prospects
- Oregon Pioneers
- Colorado Blizzard
- Washington Lumbermen
- Los Angeles Breakers
- Kansas Twisters
- Orlando Crushers
- Texas Rattlers
- Houston Cattlemen
- Wisconsin Icemen

Expansion team:

- Albuquerque Aztecs

== Production ==
=== Development ===
Oliver Stone developed a script called Monday Night written by Jamie Williams, a former tight end for the Nebraska Cornhuskers and later the San Francisco 49ers, and Richard Weiner, a sports journalist. Stone separately acquired the spec script On Any Given Sunday by John Logan. The film was originally developed at Turner Pictures for Illusion Entertainment Group. Stone later amalgamated a third screenplay, Playing Hurt by Daniel Pyne, developed at Warner Bros. for producer Richard Donner in 1995, into the project as a byproduct of the merger between Time Warner and Turner Broadcasting System.

As of May 1, 1999, the screenplay's cover page listed the following writers: original draft by Jamie Williams and Richard Weiner, John Logan, Daniel Pyne; subsequent revisions by Gary Ross; revisions by Raynold Gideon and Bruce A. Evans; revisions by John Logan; revisions by Lisa Amsterdam and Robert Huizenga; latest revisions by Oliver Stone.

The Writers Guild of America ultimately awarded screenplay credit to Logan and Stone, with "story" credit to Pyne and Logan. Williams and Weiner went uncredited for their original screenplay, but were credited for their work on the film as technical consultants.

The screenplay was also based in part on the 1994 book You're Okay, It's Just a Bruise: A Doctor's Sideline Secrets by Robert Huizenga. Huizenga was the intern doctor for the Los Angeles Raiders in their 1980s heyday, working under Dr. Robert T. Rosenfeld, who dismissed many players' injuries with the phrase, "You're okay, it's just a bruise".

James Woods's character is based on Rosenfeld. His first diagnosis of "Cap" Rooney's career-threatening injury at the beginning of the film is "you're okay, it's just a bruise". Huizenga left the Raiders in the early 1990s, disgusted at the way that the medical advice was kept from players and Rosenfeld being allowed to continue treating them after several mishaps, one of which is closely mirrored in the film—Shark's neck injury and risk of sudden death, based on the real-life Mike Harden case.

=== Casting ===
Director Oliver Stone's first two choices to play Tony D'Amato were Al Pacino and Robert De Niro. Henry Rollins was offered a role as a football player but turned it down because he felt that he did not have the size to make the portrayal believable. Sean "P. Diddy" Combs was cast as Willie Beamen, but dropped out amidst rumors that he could not throw a football convincingly. Publicly, Combs dropped out of the project because of scheduling conflicts with his recording career. Will Smith turned down the role, saying that he was not interested. According to Cuba Gooding Jr., he met with Oliver Stone about playing the role of Willie Beamen, but Stone turned Gooding down because he had already played a football player in Jerry Maguire (1996). Chris Tucker turned down the role of Willie Beamen. George Clooney was offered the role of Jack Rooney, but turned it down because he thought that Stone was going to rewrite the script for him. Ving Rhames was originally cast in a role in the film, but he dropped out due to production delays and scheduling conflicts with Mission: Impossible 2. Cameron Diaz dropped out of Inspector Gadget to play her role in the film.

Five Pro Football Hall of Fame players make cameo appearances as opposing head coaches: Bob St. Clair, Y. A. Tittle, Dick Butkus, Warren Moon, & Johnny Unitas.

Jim Caviezel played Tony D'Amato's estranged son, but his scenes were cut. They can be seen in the "Extra Features" of the Oliver Stone Collection DVD. Tom Sizemore also had a role in the film, but it too was cut.

=== Principal photography ===
The film was shot in Miami, Florida, and Irving, Texas. When the team traveled to California, the stadium that was used is Pro Player Stadium, which is located in Miami Gardens. Texas Stadium (former home of the Dallas Cowboys) is used for the home of the fictitious Dallas Knights.

Director Oliver Stone failed to get the National Football League's permission to use real NFL team logos and stadiums for the film. As a result, the Sharks play at the Miami Orange Bowl (which the NFL Miami Dolphins abandoned after the 1986 season) in the fictional Affiliated Football Franchises of America (AFFA), not to be confused with the real minor-league AFA from the 1970s and 80s. (Since the Dolphins are mentioned in one scene, the AFFA apparently exists alongside the NFL in this universe.)

For the scenes during a football game, production asked local schools to participate as extras for the film, including Lake Stevens Middle School in Miami, for each shot for which the crowd was asked to move around so that each section looked filled. In empty seats, cardboard cutouts were placed in seats with balloons attached to them so that they would seem to be in motion.

Practice scenes were filmed in the ill-fated Homestead Sports Complex, which was built for spring-training baseball; however, the stadium was damaged by Hurricane Andrew in 1992 and eventually torn down without ever hosting a Major League team.

The film also uses Arena Football League players, such as Pat O'Hara, who played for the Tampa Bay Storm and coached the Orlando Predators and became an assistant coach with the Tennessee Titans, Connell Maynor, who also played for the Predators and spent time as both a player and coach for the Philadelphia Soul, and Bjorn Nittmo, then with the AFL's Buffalo Destroyers, was the Sharks' placekicker.

== Soundtrack ==
A soundtrack containing hip hop, rock and R&B music was released on January 4, 2000, by Atlantic Records. It peaked at #28 on the Billboard 200 and #11 on the Top R&B/Hip-Hop Albums.

Oliver Stone wanted to use the music of the Canadian band Godspeed You! Black Emperor, and actually filmed a scene using their music. However, when he asked for permission, the band said no, and Stone was forced to redo the scene without the music.

Film composer Richard Horowitz, who supplied the original score, published his complete music for the film on a promotional CD.

== Release ==
Any Given Sunday was released by Warner Bros. Pictures on December 22, 1999.

=== Home media ===
==== Director's cut ====
When released to home-video on VHS and DVD, a new director's cut by Oliver Stone was used. Due to the package listing, "6 minutes of previously unseen footage" and a running time of 156 minutes, many assumed that the theatrical cut was 150 minutes, and that Stone had added six minutes of footage. In actuality, the theatrical cut ran 162 minutes; 12 minutes were deleted for the director's cut, and six minutes of new footage were added. Stone said that these changes were made to help the film's pacing.

== Reception ==
=== Box office ===
Any Given Sunday debuted on Wednesday with $3.6 million in ticket sales. During its opening weekend, the film earned more than $13.5 million from 2,505 theaters, with an average of $5,423 per theater. Its five-day opening period brought its total to $20.6 million, enough to place it at number one at the weekend box office for December 24–26. It opened ahead of The Talented Mr. Ripley, which earned $12.7 million over the same weekend. The film fell to fifth place in its second weekend after taking in $11.6 million, a decline of 14.2% from its opening weekend, and trailed Stuart Little, Toy Story 2, The Talented Mr. Ripley and The Green Mile.

Any Given Sunday ultimately earned $75.5 million in North America and a further $24.7 million internationally, giving it a worldwide theatrical gross of $100.2 million. Produced on a budget of $55 million, the film finished its theatrical run with a worldwide gross exceeding its production cost.

=== Critical response ===
The film received mixed reviews. Rotten Tomatoes gave an aggregated score of 51% positive from 128 reviews, with an average rating of 5.5/10. The site's consensus states: "Sometimes entertaining, but overall Any Given Sunday is a disappointment coming from Oliver Stone." On Metacritic, Any Given Sunday has an aggregated score of 52%, based on reviews from 33 critics, indicating "mixed or average" reviews. Audiences polled by CinemaScore gave the film an average grade of "B−" on a scale of A+ to F.

Time Out's Andrew Johnston wrote, "It's often been said of films about sports that smaller balls equal better movies. Any Given Sunday explodes that theory, and not just because of the incredible intensity of its gridiron action. Oliver Stone's best movie in many years—and one of his finest ever—looks at the world of professional football from almost every conceivable angle, but it never tries to be the definitive statement on the subject. A surprisingly balanced film that merges Stone's hyperkinetic style with a character-centric narrative approach reminiscent of John Sayles and Robert Altman at their best, Sunday proves that powerful human drama and MTV visual pyrotechnics actually can coexist after all."

Roger Ebert of the Chicago Sun-Times also gave the film a mostly positive review, awarding it 3 stars out of 4, but criticized its length. "I guess I recommend the movie because the dramatic scenes are worth it. Pacino has some nice heart-to-hearts with Quaid and Foxx, and the psychology of the veteran coach is well-captured in the screenplay by Stone and John Logan. But if some studio executive came along and made Stone cut his movie down to two hours, I have the strangest feeling it wouldn't lose much of substance and might even play better."

Conversely, Richard Schickel of Time criticized the story as being "standard", and stated "(a)lmost three hours of this jitter deteriorates from bravura filmmaking to annoying mannerism, and Any Given Sunday ends up less than the sum of its many, often interesting parts."

Rick Groen of The Globe and Mail wrote that the story was "(c)hoc-a-bloc with manly blather about sacrifice and honour and rugged individuals pulling together for the greater glory of the team".

Elaborating on many critics' shared observations that the movie was "hyperkinetic", Jack Matthews of the New York Daily News stated that "the sensation we get from the blizzard of images and teeth-jarring sound effects is of having our head used as the football".

Stephen Holden of The New York Times criticized Dennis Quaid as too old for his part, Cameron Diaz as "not up to the dramatic demands of her unsympathetic character", and the "ludicrously upbeat" ending, but complimented the portrayal of in-game action, in which the "kinetic furor of the game sequences helps camouflage the weaknesses of a screenplay that is a mechanically contrived series of power struggles".

=== Accolades ===
Year	Award	Category	Nominee(s)	Result	Ref.
1999	New York Film Critics Circle Awards	Best Supporting Actor	Jamie Foxx	2nd place	
2000	ALMA Awards	Outstanding Actress in a Feature Film	Cameron Diaz	Won	
2000	Berlin International Film Festival	Golden Berlin Bear	Oliver Stone	Nominated	
2000	Blockbuster Entertainment Awards	Favorite Actor - Drama	Al Pacino	Nominated	
2000	Blockbuster Entertainment Awards	Favorite Actress - Drama	Cameron Diaz	Won	
2000	Blockbuster Entertainment Awards	Favorite Supporting Actor - Drama	Jamie Foxx	Nominated	
2000	BMI Film & TV Awards		Richard Horowitz	Won	
2000	Cinema Audio Society, USA	Outstanding Achievement in Sound Mixing for a Feature Film		Nominated	
2000	MTV Movie Awards	Breakthrough Male Performance	Jamie Foxx	Nominated	
2000	Teen Choice Awards	Choice Hissy Fit	Cameron Diaz	Nominated	
2000	Black Reel Awards	Theatrical - Best Supporting Actor	Jamie Foxx	Nominated	

== See also ==
- List of American football films
