= Elle Johnson =

Lois "Elle" Johnson is an American television writer, producer, and showrunner.

== Early life and education ==
Johnson grew up in Hollis, Queens in New York City. Her father was a parole officer and her uncle was a homicide detective. In 1981, her 16-year-old cousin was killed in a botched robbery at a Burger King in the Bronx.

Johnson graduated from Harvard University in 1986 with an AB in art history.

== Career ==
Given her family's background in law enforcement, Johnson's career as a writer and producer in television has centered around police procedurals and other police crime dramas, including Homicide: Life on the Street, CSI: Miami, Street Time, Law & Order, The Glades, and Bosch. Other shows she has worked on include Rescue 77, Any Day Now, Ghost Whisperer, and The Fosters.

Johnson, formerly a member of Writers Guild of America West, left and maintained financial core status in 1999.

Johnson was an executive producer and co-showrunner for the 2020 Netflix miniseries Self Made: Inspired by the Life of Madam C. J. Walker.

== Writings ==
Johnson is the author of the memoir The Officer's Daughter, published by HarperCollins in 2021. The book focuses on the murder of her cousin and her relationship with her father.
