= Kerry McCluggage =

American movie and TV production executive (born 1954)

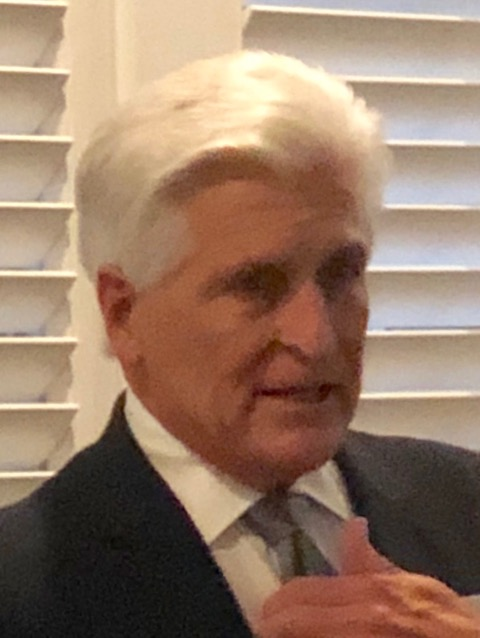
- Born: November 29, 1954 (age 71)
- Education: University of Southern California; Harvard Business School
- Occupations: Motion picture producer, Film industry executive
- Years active: 1975–present

Kerry McCluggage (born November 29, 1954) is an American television and film production executive who developed and produced TV series like Miami Vice, Cheers, and Law & Order. He served as President of Universal Television throughout the 1980s and later as Chairman of Paramount Television in the 1990s. McCluggage was a co-founder of United Paramount Network (UPN). In 2002, he launched his own company, Craftsman Films, to develop motion picture and television content.

== Education ==
At the University of Southern California, McCluggage studied broadcasting and film and was a member of the Sigma Chi fraternity. He later gained his MBA at the Harvard Business School, graduating in 1978. He currently serves on the Sigma Chi Foundation Board of Governors.

== Career ==
McCluggage began his television career in 1978 at Universal Television as a programming assistant. He rose to senior vice president of creative affairs, overseeing series such as Magnum, P.I., The Equalizer, Murder, She Wrote, The A-Team, and Miami Vice. As president of Universal Television, he also helped develop Quantum Leap, Law & Order, Northern Exposure, Coach, and Major Dad.

At Paramount Television, he oversaw the development and launch of programs such as Cheers , its spinoff Frasier , the Star Trek franchise, Entertainment Tonight , The Arsenio Hall Show , Judge Judy , Judge Joe Brown and Judge Mills Lane . In just over a decade, he is credited for growing Paramount TV from $700 million in value to $3.2 billion. He was a co-founder of United Paramount Network (UPN). He developed UPN's original plan and oversaw its launch in January, 1995. The UPN channel was home to Star Trek: Voyager and the sitcom, Moesha. From mid-2018 until the end of 2018, McCluggage stepped in as CEO of IDW Media Holdings (Idea and Design Works), a subdivision of IDW Publishing, temporarily replacing its founder, Ted Adams, who was on sabbatical.

== Miami Vice ==
The idea for Miami Vice originated with 32 year-old Anthony Yerkovich. It was to be a motion picture with the working title "Dade County" or "Gold Coast". In 1983, Yerkovich was working at MCA/Universal and his chief creative partner there was 28 year-old McCluggage, then senior vice-president of creative affairs for the company’s TV division, Universal Television. McCluggage had already overseen the development of at least three very successful TV series and, despite his young age, carried significant influence. As far as making Yerkovich's new idea into a motion picture, Universal's Film Division had already committed to make Scarface and they felt it was unwise to make another Miami crime film. To make a new plan for the project, McCluggage explored making it a television series. He said, "We sent Tony [Yerkovich] to Miami to do some on-site research, and he came back enthused about doing his project as a TV series."

With the urging of McCluggage and MCA/Universal president Robert Harris, Yerkovich sold the project to NBC as a weekly series instead of a theatrical feature. He began writing the pilot for it. The lead characters were cast and the cinematic style of the series was set by the pilot. But early in the filming, McCluggage and Yerkovich agreed that Don Johnson's performance as seen in the dailies was showing too much emotional rawness, which they said was like "channeling Nick Nolte". They flew to Miami to meet with Johnson to ask for a different approach to playing Sonny Crockett’s character. He was receptive and was able to make a quick change in interpreting the intended role.

The show became known for its stylish visuals and cultural cachet. It soon became one of the hippest series in TV history for guest-stars, especially if you were a musician or a real-life political figure. Guest stars included Miles Davis, Frank Zappa, G. Gordon Liddy, Lee Iacocca, Sheena Easton, Leonard Cohen, and Willie Nelson all of whom took turns charming, tormenting, or baffling Crockett and Tubbs. The series received 15 Emmy nominations.

== Filmography ==
As a producer and executive, McCluggage was involved with a wide range of television series, including: The A-Team, Coach, Deadwood, The Equalizer, Frasier, JAG, Northern Exposure, Law & Order, Miami Vice, Murder, She Wrote, Knight Rider, Quantum Leap, Cheers, and Entertainment Tonight.

At Universal Pictures, he contributed to the development of films such as The Breakfast Club, Out of Africa, and Cocktail.
