= Daniel Pyne =

American writer and producer

Daniel Pyne is an American writer and producer. He has written novels as well as film scripts.

Pyne broke into the industry after writing some scripts with a friend, Scott Shepherd. This attracted interest at the company of Aaron Spelling which led to being staffed on Matt Houston. He then went on to work for Miami Vice and created a TV show called Hard Copy.

== Select filmography ==
- Matt Houston (1984–85) - writer of various episodes
- Miami Vice (1985) - writer of various episodes
- Pacific Heights (1990)
- The Antagonists (1991) - writer of various episodes
- Doc Hollywood (1991)
- The Hard Way (1991)
- White Sands (1992)
- Where's Marlowe? (1998) - also directed
- Any Given Sunday (1999)
- Fracture (2007)
- Backstabbing for Beginners (2018)
