= Blue Bloods season 14 =

Season of television series

Blue Bloods
- Season 14
- No. of episodes: 18

Release
- Original network: CBS
- Original release: February 16 – December 13, 2024

Season chronology
- ← Previous; Season 13

The fourteenth and final season of Blue Bloods, a police procedural drama series created by Robin Green and Mitchell Burgess, premiered on CBS on February 16, 2024.

The first half of the season, consisting of 10 episodes, premiered on February 16, 2024, while the second half of the season, consisting of 8 episodes, premiered on October 18, 2024.

== Production ==
On November 20, 2023, it was announced that the fourteenth season would be the series's final season, with the first 10 episodes begin airing February 16, 2024, and the remaining eight in the fall of 2024, with producers including Selleck having pushed the network for the extension beyond the spring for the additional episodes in the fall. The second half of the final season premiered on October 18, 2024 and the series finale aired on December 13, 2024.

On June 4, 2024, Paramount Global co-CEO Brian Robbins said at a shareholder presentation that there were plans for a "franchise extension" of Blue Bloods.

In February 2025, CBS officially announced that Donnie Wahlberg would star in and be an executive producer on a spin-off with the working title Boston Blue, ordered straight to series, set to premiere in the fall.

== Cast ==
=== Main ===
- Tom Selleck as New York City Police Commissioner Francis Xavier "Frank" Reagan
- Donnie Wahlberg as Detective 1st Grade Daniel "Danny" Reagan
- Bridget Moynahan as ADA Erin Reagan
- Will Estes as Sergeant Jamison "Jamie" Reagan
- Len Cariou as New York City Police Commissioner Henry Reagan (Retired)
- Vanessa Ray as Officer Edit "Eddie" Janko
- Marisa Ramirez as Detective 1st Grade Maria Baez

=== Recurring ===
- Abigail Hawk as Detective 1st Grade Abigail Baker
- Gregory Jbara as Deputy Commissioner of Public Information Garrett Moore
- Robert Clohessy as Lieutenant Sidney "Sid" Gormley
- Steve Schirripa as DA Investigator Anthony Abetemarco
- Dylan Walsh as Mayor Peter Chase
- Will Hochman as Detective 3rd Grade Joseph "Joe" Hill
- Andrew Terraciano as Sean Reagan
- Ian Quinlan as Officer Luis Badillo
- Stephanie Kurtzuba as Captain Paula McNichols
- James Hiroyuki Liao as Lieutenant Fleming

=== Guest ===
- Sami Gayle as Nicky Reagan-Boyle
- Tony Terraciano as Jack Reagan
- Malik Yoba as Darryl Reid
- Jennifer Esposito as Jackie Curatola
- Edward James Olmos as Lorenzo Batista
- Aidan Quinn as Detective Gus Vanderlip
- Lauren Patten as Rachel Witten
- Lori Loughlin as Grace Edwards
- Alex Duong as Sonny Le

== Episodes ==
No. overall	No. in season	Title	Directed by	Written by	Original release date	Prod. code	U.S. viewers (millions)
Part 1
276	1	"Loyalty"	Alex Zakrzewski	Ian Biederman	February 16, 2024	1401	5.67
Jamie's undercover mission with a human trafficking ring nearly ends in tragedy when the group realizes an undercover officer is with them, but he is able to improvise and buy the girls some time. Also, Danny and Baez respond to a complaint where a husband is suspected of beating his wife, but the husband is murdered later that day. The battered wife is the prime suspect, but her father, Danny's old partner Daryl Reid (Malik Yoba), falsely confesses to the act to protect her and make up for their tough past. Thanks to testimony from Erin and Reid, the wife is sentenced to six months for manslaughter, and Reid promises to take care of his grandson until she goes free. Meanwhile, Frank grapples with whether to publicly support Mayor Chase (Dylan Walsh) on a policy decision that will make him appear to take a political stance even though he is not one for politics, and the two adversaries are able to find some common ground. Elsewhere, Eddie witnesses a child shoplifting expensive merchandise from a store, which is not prosecuted anymore. Erin then advises Eddie to file a civilian complaint since she was not on tour at the time.
277	2	"Dropping Bombs"	Jackeline Tejada	Siobhan Byrne O'Connor	February 23, 2024	1402	5.45
Danny and Baez join forces with Jackie Curatola (Jennifer Esposito) to finally bring Dr. Walker to justice. In interrogation, Danny uses Dr. Walker's alter ego to trick him into confessing, but not before he accuses Danny of suppressing deeper feelings for both Baez and Jackie. Baez also is upset that Danny shared notes with Jackie while alone. Meanwhile, Eddie calls a bus on a woman in her precinct's holding cell who alleges that a sergeant raped her; not notifying her captain or her partner doesn't sit well with either of them, and the rest of the squad turns their back on Eddie since it appears she did not have a fellow officer's back. Erin and Anthony speak with the sergeant and his lawyer, who alleges that it was consensual and that the woman seduced him first. The sergeant is suspended pending further investigation, and Eddie makes amends with Badillo. Also, Joe Hill (Will Hochman), working with the FBI on a drug operation, unknowingly interferes in Jamie's undercover operation, leading to conflict between the two that intensifies after Joe angrily brings up his father's death. Elsewhere, Frank is blindsided when Mayor Chase (Dylan Walsh) publicly suggests bringing back a Commission of Police.
278	3	"Fear No Evil"	Ralph Hemecker	Kevin Riley & Jack Ciapciak	March 1, 2024	1403	5.55
Frank learns that his friend Lenny Ross has died and that his daughter Tess is in jail for assault. His "tough love" method of trying to steer Tess in the right direction puts him at odds with Baker and Henry. At Sunday dinner, Frank pays tribute to his friend. Meanwhile, Jamie and Joe continue their joint investigation, hoping to fulfill Joe's promise to a woman to reunite her with her sister who was kidnapped as part of the ring. Though they succeed in bringing down the human trafficking ring and Jamie's operation is over, the two still do not see eye to eye. Also, Danny and Erin clash when she goes behind Danny's back to use his old criminal informant Buggs in an investigation. Note: This episode was dedicated to the late Treat Williams, who played Lenny Ross in a recurring role on the show.
279	4	"Past is Present"	Bridget Moynahan	Daniel Truly	March 15, 2024	1404	5.47
Frank bestows a medal upon two officers for delivering a baby, but only one of them arrives at his office. The other is the son of Sonny Malevsky who had applied to the NYPD under his mother's maiden name intending to right his father's wrongs. Frank is deeply appalled by this revelation, not unlike his Dream Team and the family, but after a meaningful discussion with Joe Hill, Frank decides to discipline the officer for lying but keep him on the force as his service speaks for itself. Meanwhile, Danny encounters Trina, a girl who helped him and Baez take down her gang leader named Jaden. After two of her troublemaking friends are stabbed by Jaden who had gotten out on a technicality, Trina is stopped from killing Jaden and comforted by Danny, who promptly arrests Jaden. Also, Erin and Anthony cross paths with an infamous mob lawyer who is shot at by seemingly one of his old clients. It turns out instead that Anthony was the intended target of someone he once put away. Elsewhere, Jamie's old friend Allison seeks to interview Henry about his days on the force, and Jamie is immediately suspicious due to the podcast's anti-cop rhetoric.
280	5	"Bad Faith"	Robert Harmon	Ian Biederman & Van B. Nguyen	April 5, 2024	1405	4.86
Erin is designated to lead a federal investigation into corrupt horse racing that involves former parole officer Don Vorhees. Initially unwilling to testify, Vorhees changes his mind after he is threatened by the US attorney with jail time for gambling violations. Erin instead gets the vet who treated the dead horses to testify against the corrupt trainer, but Anthony informs Erin after the case is closed that Vorhees was shot dead despite not taking the stand. Meanwhile, Jamie investigates a drug operation involving rival gangs, against his boss's orders. Jamie sees the investigation through anyway, and rather than being suspended or fired, Jamie is promoted due to his boss being impressed with his work. Elsewhere, Danny and Baez look into a series of assaults in Little Vietnam with the help of Sonny Le, who they had worked with before, when one of the assault victims ends up dead. Also, Frank is torn when he learns the Brotherhood of Teamsters are lobbying for NYPD officers to join their union.
281	6	"Shadowland"	Jackeline Tejada	Yasmine Cadet	April 12, 2024	1406	5.41
Danny and Baez investigate the disappearance of a young girl with special needs and discover her dead. Baez calls her old partner Wesley to help with the case that points them toward a voodoo worship center. After solving the case, Wesley invites Baez to have a drink, and Danny appears disheartened to see Baez with someone else. Meanwhile, Eddie and a fellow officer who is African-American team up with Captain McNichols when they suspect a prestigious school is employing discriminatory admission practices. The school is indeed found to discriminate, but not against Black people; rather, they are not letting children of cops enroll. Elsewhere, Erin visits a local middle school for career day and is confronted by one of the students who claims that Erin sent her older brother to prison on drug charges despite being a first-time offender. Also, Frank tries to help Garrett's neighbor when her car is held as police evidence; though Garrett's neighbor is cleared of any wrongdoing, the person that stole the car before used it to hide drugs, and the detectives working the case claim Erin's office is holding the car due to protocols.
282	7	"On the Ropes"	Doug Aarniokoski	Daniel Truly & Peter D'Antonio	April 26, 2024	1407	5.38
Jamie teams with Captain McNichols to bust a group of scammers who use artificial intelligence to pose as elderly citizens' grandchildren to defraud them. Meanwhile, Danny and Baez investigate a series of mysterious deaths at a hospital, acting on a tip from a nurse who was an old friend of Linda's. Meanwhile, Anthony is determined to take down an attorney who exploits the Americans with Disabilities Act for his own financial gain, but he becomes the target of an IAB investigation when the attorney is beaten nearly to death shortly after Anthony confronts him. Also, Frank disapproves when he learns Gormley is planning to face off against his former partner, Sergeant Russo, in a "smoker" boxing match to settle a long-running feud between the two.
283	8	"Wicked Games"	Ralph Hemecker	Kevin Reilly	May 3, 2024	1408	5.16
Erin informs an infuriated Danny that Sam Evans (David R. Nash), a serial killer who once targeted Baez and her daughter, has been released from prison early on a deal. Danny and Baez are on edge and Evans ambushes Danny at his house, but Baez kills him before he harms Danny. Also, Jamie and Anthony team up when Anthony's criminal informant (who happens to be his ex-wife's brother) rats out mob members regarding a gambling operation. Meanwhile, Eddie reports a sergeant in her squad that keeps downgrading her cases to McNichols, only to discover that her captain and the sergeant are romantically involved. Elsewhere, Baker goes behind Frank's back to transfer her husband to the mayor's protection detail on his wishes. Frank is disappointed that Baker kept this from him and tried to use a hook at 1PP, and he also discovers that the people who work with him find him intimidating.
284	9	"Two of a Kind"	Doug Aarniokoski	Jack Ciapciak	May 10, 2024	1409	5.15
Sean becomes the latest victim in a series of robberies on his college campus. Though Danny is worried, Sean insists that he is fine and he was able to replace his stolen goods. The robber strikes again, and Sean is injured when he tries to intervene to help a young woman. He tells Danny he recognized the perp, but when Danny goes to arrest him, he gives up his boss: the head of security at the campus. Also, Erin has offered a deal for a first-time offender who robbed a store with his friend (the latter of whom has a record), but the attorney announces he has pled not guilty. Erin soon discovers that the attorney is also representing the friend and correctly figures that he is more interested in helping the friend. Meanwhile, Eddie and Badillo investigate an apartment burglary in which the tenants suspect their landlord. This soon reveals the revelation of an affair. Elsewhere, Joe Hill and Jamie's conflict reaches a boiling point when they get into a fight outside of a bar, making Frank livid at their behavior. He forces Jamie and Joe to ride together, and they eventually put some of their animosity aside.
285	10	"The Heart of a Saturday Night"	Ralph Hemecker	Teleplay by : Kevin Wade; Story by : James Nuciforo & Kevin Wade	May 17, 2024	1410	5.25
Gormley asks Danny to help find his old friend Gus Vanderlip (Aiden Quinn), a committed detective who is dangerously determined to find out how a serial rapist he recently arrested is back on the streets. A tense exchange between the three results in Gus abandoning his weapon and being brought in to the 54th precinct, though Danny and Gormley are visibly reluctant to proceed with charges. Meanwhile, Jamie and Eddie's vacation plans for their 5th anniversary are derailed at the last moment by McNichols, who sends them undercover to take down a corrupt sober living house. Also, Henry asks Frank to help "move along" the application of a deceased officer on behalf of his family for benefits regarding the NYPD's 9/11 Victims Compensation Fund. Though the officer had helped many victims and their families with healing following the event, an investigation by Baker reveals that he hadn't worked at Ground Zero as claimed. Note: Nominated for the Movieguide Awards in three categories.
Part 2
286	11	"Life Sentence"	Jackeline Tejada	Siobhan Byrne O'Connor	October 18, 2024	1411	5.02
Danny and Baez work with Erin and Eddie when their homicide case converges with an allegation of jury tampering against Erin as well as Eddie's bond to a young girl who witnessed her mother's murder at the hands of the suspect Danny and Baez are investigating. The case makes Eddie desire to try having children with Jamie, which he agrees to. Meanwhile, Jamie's Chevelle is stolen, so he joins forces with Joe Hill to recover it. Despite Jamie's apprehension to working with Joe, the two bring back their familial bond, and Jamie ultimately decides to give Joe the car that belonged to his father. Elsewhere, Archbishop Kearns (Stacy Keach) asks Frank to arrest a man wanted for murder in Ohio, a state that has the death penalty, leaving Frank conflicted.
287	12	"Without Fear or Favor"	Donald Thorin, Jr.	Ian Biederman	October 25, 2024	1412	4.61
Danny works with British Investigator Christopher Granger (Jake Weber) to apprehend a deadly international fugitive that is expecting a gun shipment and had killed his former crew. Meanwhile, Erin and Anthony respond to a scene where an officer tased a robber in the back after he pulled a knife near a crowd, with the perp being struck by a vehicle and sending the knife 40 feet away. Crawford pressures Erin to convince the grand jury to indict despite not understanding the circumstances of the incident, but the investigation reveals the officer acted by the book, angering Crawford. Also, Jamie investigates a sports gambling website accused of scamming its users, only to discover that the children of the three men that filed the complaint made the bets as a prank. Elsewhere, Frank learns that a retired cop was arrested following an argument where he pulled his weapon and that Mayor Chase (Dylan Walsh) had him released since he led Chase's protection detail. The same officer gets into another argument in a road rage incident, but the other person shoots him in the chest, devastating both Frank and Chase.
288	13	"Bad to Worse"	Alex Zakrzewski	Tara Garvey & Daniel Truly	November 1, 2024	1413	5.10
The newly-appointed FDNY commissioner (Mira Sorvino) is furious when Mayor Chase does not attend the funeral of a firefighter in favor of a rally for migrants suspected of causing the fire. Frank tries to play mediator to no avail. Meanwhile, Erin learns that Henry has agreed to testify for the defense attorney (which he is usually against) in a harassment case where the defendant is a former cop with a bad reputation and attitude. Henry does not tell Erin beforehand about his testimony, which serves to rightfully convict the former officer. Also, Danny and Baez investigate when human remains are found in a storage unit, soon realizing a serial killer is on the loose. Elsewhere, Eddie and Badillo arrest a protester after he stomps on Badillo's hand and inadvertently causes a bicycle crash, but later discover he is set to donate his kidney to his girlfriend, the daughter of a former cop that used his influence to cut the man loose. When the man shows signs of backing out due to fear, Badillo uses reverse psychology to convince him not to turn his back on her.
289	14	"New York Minute"	Ralph Hemecker	Nicole Abraham & Jack Ciapciak	November 8, 2024	1414	4.85
Danny and Baez are called in when a detective investigating an art gallery suspected of fraud was murdered and left in a dumpster days earlier. Meanwhile, Eddie and Badillo respond to a scene where a mentally ill client of Rachel Witten (Lauren Patten) has her in a chokehold. Eddie finds out Rachel intentionally triggered him to get him the help he needs, feeling the system hasn't done enough for him or his family. Things escalate when the man holds his sister over a high balcony threatening to drop her, and Rachel decides to quit since she crossed a line. Also, Frank is reacquainted with Grace Edwards (Lori Loughlin), now a lawyer for a group bestowing a high Irish honor, when the group rescinds an award meant to be given to Danny due to his past. Henry tells Jamie and Erin he thinks the award is cursed since Joe accepted it just before his death. Danny is upset upon learning his family had been talking about it behind his back, but when the group reverses its stance and offers the award to him, he decides not to accept as he feels that it is rightfully Joe's and should remain that way.
290	15	"No Good Deed"	Alex Zakrzewski	Peter D'Antonio	November 15, 2024	1415	4.73
Danny and his nephew Joe Hill (Will Hochman) investigate the homicide of a delivery driver who may have been connected to an illegal narcotics ring in the city. Joe's results-oriented method of working the case irritates Danny until Joe saves his uncle's life in a shootout. Also, Eddie and Badillo respond to a robbery that turns into a hostage situation. A young probationary officer who is not trained to respond to crime subdues the criminal but may be fired due to the woman's husband alleging he is liable for her tearing her ACL. Determined to help the young man, Eddie discovers there is no merit to the lawsuit. Though the man is fired from the NYPD, Eddie encourages him to pursue employment with the Nassau County police department. Meanwhile, Frank learns Gormley has run late more than once in recent weeks, discovering he has moved in with his mother to care for her while she is in the late stages of heart failure. Frank is torn since the NYPD has strict residency requirements. Elsewhere, Erin clashes with her boss, D.A. Crawford, (Roslyn Ruff) when a seemingly rehabilitated criminal from an old case becomes the subject of an armed robbery investigation.
291	16	"The Gray Areas"	Doug Aarniokoski	Kevin Riley & Van B. Nguyen	November 22, 2024	1416	5.05
Danny and Baez investigate the death of a rising MMA fighter who was killed for refusing to fix fights. Also, Eddie and Jamie find Badillo outside of a police charity event smoking weed. Someone in the department files an anonymous complaint, risking Badillo's career, and this happens to coincide with his annual fishing trip with the son of his late patrol partner, unbeknownst to Eddie and Jamie and causing alarm for them. Upon finding this out, Jamie states that he filed a false report (though he didn't actually do so), giving him a citation but saving Badillo's job. Meanwhile, a sergeant is attacked by thugs at a subway station, and Mayor Chase announces plans to ask the governor to send in the National Guard for the subway system, angering Frank since this gives the perception that the mayor thinks the NYPD can't do their jobs effectively. Elsewhere, Erin presides over a mock trial and is shocked when the winner of the competition is arrested for drug possession. Although he had run with a gang in his youth, he turned his life around, and it is discovered that the second-place participant planted the drugs on him due to jealousy.
292	17	"Entitlement"	Jackeline Tejada	Yasmine Cadet & Daniel Truly	December 6, 2024	1417	5.36
Eddie and Badillo find a squatter in a man's apartment but clash with Jamie when he reveals the squatter is his confidential informant. Meanwhile, Danny and Baez investigate an apparent suicide of a bullied student in her dorm after her mother swears she wouldn't do such a thing. Elsewhere, Frank believes Governor Mendez (David Zayas) has an ulterior motive when he comes to him with a plan to collaborate. Also, sparks fly between Anthony and a potential witness for a trial, and Erin tries to set the two up. It is also revealed that Erin and Jack are back together again.
293	18	"End of Tour"	Alex Zakrzewski	Siobhan Byrne O'Connor & Kevin Wade	December 13, 2024	1418	5.86
Eddie, her partner Badillo and Mayor Chase (Dylan Walsh) get shot by gang members. While Eddie and Chase are hospitalized, Badillo dies. Also, Frank arrives in prison to get information from Lorenzo Batista (Edward James Olmos) about the gang members. Jack Boyle (Peter Hermann) reunites with Erin and they decide to get remarried. Jamie and Eddie announce that they're having a child.

== Ratings ==
Viewership and ratings per episode of Blue Bloods season 14
No.	Title	Air date	Rating/share (18–49)	Viewers (millions)	DVR (18–49)	DVR viewers (millions)	Total (18–49)	Total viewers (millions)	Ref.
1	"Loyalty"	February 16, 2024	0.4/5	5.67	—N/a	—N/a	—N/a	—N/a	
2	"Dropping Bombs"	February 23, 2024	0.3/4	5.45	—N/a	—N/a	—N/a	—N/a	
3	"Fear No Evil"	March 1, 2024	0.4/5	5.55	—N/a	—N/a	—N/a	—N/a	
4	"Past is Present"	March 15, 2024	0.4/4	5.47	0.1	2.67	0.5	8.15 (Note: Live +7 ratings were not available, so Live +3 ratings have been used instead.)	
5	"Bad Faith"	April 5, 2024	0.3/3	4.86	0.2	3.35	0.6	8.21	
6	"Shadowland"	April 12, 2024	0.3/4	5.40	0.2	2.91	0.5	8.31	
7	"On the Ropes"	April 26, 2024	0.3/3	5.38	0.2	3.27	0.5	8.66	
8	"Wicked Games"	May 3, 2024	0.3/3	5.16	0.2	2.95	0.5	8.11	
9	"Two of a Kind"	May 10, 2024	0.3/3	5.15	0.2	2.81	0.5	7.96	
10	"The Heart of a Saturday Night"	May 17, 2024	0.3/3	5.25	0.2	2.75	0.5	8.01	
11	"Life Sentence"	October 18, 2024	0.3/4	5.02	0.2	2.77	0.5	7.79	
12	"Without Fear or Favor"	October 25, 2024	0.3/3	4.61	0.2	2.69	0.4	7.30	
13	"Bad to Worse"	November 1, 2024	0.3/5	5.10	0.2	2.59	0.5	7.69	
14	"New York Minute"	November 8, 2024	0.3/4	4.85	0.2	2.82	0.5	7.68	
15	"No Good Deed"	November 15, 2024	0.2/4	4.73	0.2	2.93	0.4	7.65	
16	"The Gray Areas"	November 22, 2024	0.3/4	5.05	0.2	2.81	0.5	7.86	
17	"Entitlement"	December 6, 2024	0.3/5	5.36	0.2	2.93	0.5	8.29	
18	"End of Tour"	December 13, 2024	0.3/5	5.86	0.2	2.98	0.5	8.85	
