= Blue Bloods season 12 =

Season of television series

Blue Bloods
- Season 12
- No. of episodes: 20

Release
- Original network: CBS
- Original release: October 1, 2021 – May 6, 2022

Season chronology
- ← Previous; Season 11 Next → Season 13

The twelfth season of Blue Bloods, a police procedural drama series created by Robin Green and Mitchell Burgess, premiered on CBS October 1, 2021. The season concluded on May 6, 2022 and contained 20 episodes.

== Cast ==
=== Main ===
- Tom Selleck as NYPD Police Commissioner Francis "Frank" Reagan
- Donnie Wahlberg as Detective 1st Grade Daniel "Danny" Reagan
- Bridget Moynahan as ADA Erin Reagan
- Will Estes as Sergeant Jamison "Jamie" Reagan
- Len Cariou as New York City Police Commissioner Henry Reagan (Retired)
- Marisa Ramirez as Detective 1st Grade Maria Baez
- Vanessa Ray as Officer Edit "Eddie" Janko

=== Recurring ===
- Abigail Hawk as Detective 1st Grade Abigail Baker
- Gregory Jbara as Deputy Commissioner of Public Information Garrett Moore
- Robert Clohessy as Lieutenant Sidney "Sid" Gormley
- Steve Schirripa as DA Investigator Anthony Abetemarco
- Stacy Keach as Archbishop Kevin Kearns
- Lauren Patten as Officer Rachell Witten
- Will Hochman as Detective 3rd Grade Joseph "Joe" Hill
- Roslyn Ruff as D.A. Kimberly "Kim" Crawford
- Ian Quinlan as Officer Luis Badillo
- Callie Thorne as Maggie Gibson
- Dylan Walsh as Mayor Peter Chase
- Peter Hermann as Jack Boyle
- Andrew Terraciano as Sean Reagan
- Treat Williams as Lenny Ross
- Stephanie Kurtzuba as Sergeant Paula McNichols

=== Guest ===
- Tony Terraciano as Jack Reagan
- Jen Jacob as Amber Zazzarino

== Episodes ==
| No. overall | No. in season | Title | Directed by | Written by | Original release date | Prod. code | U.S. viewers (millions) |
|---|---|---|---|---|---|---|---|
| 235 | 1 | "Hate Is Hate" | David Barrett | Siobhan Byrne O'Connor | October 1, 2021 | 1201 | 6.30 |
As Danny consults medium Maggie Gibson (Callie Thorne) to solve the murder of a young boy, Frank is at odds with the mayor (Dylan Walsh) over how best to protect the city from an uptick in crime following a high-profile shooting. Elsewhere, Erin investigates a decades-old murder case in which the primary eyewitness is her boss, DA Kimberly Crawford (Roslyn Ruff), who was 13 years old at the time. Also, Eddie's partner Witten (Lauren Patten) is accused of threatening a young man by pulling her gun after he struck her from behind, and she is forced to take a modified assignment as IAB investigates.
| 236 | 2 | "Times Like These" | Robert Harmon | Brian Burns | October 8, 2021 | 1202 | 6.00 |
Tension escalates between Frank and Mayor Chase after Frank makes a public arrest that goes viral. Elsewhere, Danny and Baez investigate a gang attack that takes an unexpected turn. Jamie worries when Eddie lies to him about where she's going in the evenings. Also, Anthony secretly recruits the Reagans for help with a surprise for Erin.
| 237 | 3 | "Protective Instincts" | Jackeline Tejada | Kevin Riley & Yasmine Cadet | October 15, 2021 | 1203 | 5.96 |
Frank must decide between remaining police commissioner and pursuing a new professional chapter when his old partner Lenny Ross (Treat Williams) presents him with an exciting job opportunity with the NFL. One consideration for Frank is how his current position will affect Erin's possible run for Manhattan DA. Elsewhere, Sean puts Jamie and Eddie in a tough position when he tries his hand at the family's business behind Danny's back. Also, Danny and Baez investigate the murder of an immigrant restaurant delivery man, soon suspecting the man's own family is involved.
| 238 | 4 | "Good Intentions" | David Barrett | Daniel Truly | October 22, 2021 | 1204 | 6.05 |
Jamie and Eddie experience marital tension when Eddie allows her newly released ex-convict father, Armin (Michael Cullen) to live with them. Meanwhile, Danny and Baez go out of their way to help a desperate Ohio man (Dave Quay) find his missing sister, only to later realize the man has not been truthful. Elsewhere, Anthony enlists Erin's help when new evidence arises in an old case from his police career that may exonerate a female gang member he put away. Also, Frank goes head to head with Archbishop Kearns (Stacy Keach) when an activist local priest causes friction between the force and church.
| 239 | 5 | "True Blue" | Ralph Hemecker | Jack Ciapciak | November 5, 2021 | 1205 | 6.20 |
Jamie faces backlash from fellow officers when he partners with Erin and Anthony to investigate an underground bar the NYPD and FDNY use to hide their criminal indiscretions. Meanwhile, Eddie's partner Witten decides to leave the force. Elsewhere, Danny and Baez investigate a female student's murder at a prestigious private school, in the process exonerating the girl's rich boyfriend who was initially accused. Also, Frank addresses an issue of police brutality committed by Baker's husband.
| 240 | 6 | "Be Smart or Be Dead" | John Behring | Siobhan Byrne O'Connor & Graham Thiel | November 12, 2021 | 1206 | 6.10 |
When the new head of the cartel, Arturo Muñoz, puts out a hit on Danny, Frank causes family tension when he assigns Jamie to guard Danny. Frank also tries to stop his cop grandson, Joe Hill (Will Hochman) from seeking revenge after he's attacked. It is learned that the attacker is someone Joe put away several years ago and who wanted revenge. Frank uses his contacts at the FBI to get him charged with a federal crime. Later, he visits Joe in his apartment and gives Joe a picture of his father as Joe had sadly admitted earlier to not having any. Elsewhere, Eddie gets a hostile new partner, and Erin's moral character is attacked by the defense when she tries an old murder case related to her boss, District Attorney Kimberley Crawford.
| 241 | 7 | "USA Today" | Ralph Hemecker | Brian Burns & Van B. Nguyen | November 19, 2021 | 1207 | 5.79 |
Danny's and Baez's attempts to find the culprit who assaulted a shop owner are hindered by the close-knit Vietnamese community's refusal to cooperate in the investigation. Meanwhile, Erin's suspicions about her boss rise when the DA assigns her to a seemingly low-level case. Also, Gormley, Garrett and Baker are threatened when Frank welcomes a new staff member to their "dream team".
| 242 | 8 | "Reality Check" | Jennifer Opresnick | Kevin Riley | December 3, 2021 | 1208 | 5.81 |
Danny partners with Anthony to solve a double homicide when Anthony's shady cousin Joey (Anthony DeSando) proves to have gang ties to the crime. Meanwhile, the boundary between Eddie and Jamie's work and personal relationship is strained when Eddie and her new partner Badillo (Ian Quinlan) ask Jamie to reassign them to different partners. Also, Erin questions the sacrifices she made for her career when she allows her law school friend to dig into her personal life to prepare her for a potential run for district attorney.
| 243 | 9 | "Firewall" | Robert Harmon | Daniel Truly & Peter D'Antonio | December 10, 2021 | 1209 | 5.77 |
Frank enlists the help of an old friend Sloane Thompson (Alex Kingston) to investigate a cyber-attack on the NYPD that forces Danny and Baez to release an evasive suspect. Meanwhile, after questioning her place within the NYPD, Baez gets shot but recovers in the hospital. Also, Eddie is torn when her temporary partner hides her pregnancy due to wanting to make detective, thereby putting herself and her unborn child at risk in the field. Elsewhere, Henry accidentally leaves a stove burner on, starting a fire in a pan. Though the fire is put out quickly and nobody is harmed, Jamie worries about Henry's well-being, bringing out the elder Reagan's stubbornness before they reach a mutual understanding.
| 244 | 10 | "Old Friends" | Jackeline Tejada | Ian Biederman | January 7, 2022 | 1210 | 6.07 |
An illegal drug shipment arriving in New York forces Danny to partner up with his Texas Rangers associate, Major Waylon Gates (Lyle Lovett), to find the narcotics before they flood the streets. Things escalate when cartel enforcers murder several members of their NYC distributors, the Ace Double Treys gang. Elsewhere, Jamie investigates an old mentor when a man alleges the ex-cop threatened him over gambling funds owed to a local bookie. Also, Frank quarrels with Mayor Chase after two cops brawl over defunding the department.
| 245 | 11 | "On the Arm" | Alex Zakrzewski | Kevin Wade & Brian Burns | January 14, 2022 | 1211 | 6.44 |
Danny pursues Dickie Delaney (Jimmy Buffett), a doppelgänger pretending to be the legendary singer Jimmy Buffett, after he's tricked into paying for the scammer's meal at an expensive restaurant. Elsewhere, Frank investigates NYPD Captain Terrell (Regina Taylor) who is using her badge to get free wares from local stores; he tries to get her to cease despite her honorable intentions. Also, Erin worries about her reputation when she's the subject of a salacious, anonymous attack on a public employee blog, and Jamie makes waves by introducing a decades-old saluting rule in his precinct. In the end, it is revealed that Jamie only reinstated that to catch a criminal who was impersonating officers in order to sneak into various precincts and steal guns. The man is caught when he doesn't salute correctly.
| 246 | 12 | "The Reagan Way" | Jackeline Tejada | Siobhan Byrne O'Connor | January 21, 2022 | 1212 | 6.27 |
Frank is at odds with his friend Archbishop Kearns (Stacy Keach) when Kearns insists the NYPD arrested the wrong man for a murder, but he can't break the confessional seal to reveal the true killer's identity. Meanwhile, Danny and Baez use unorthodox methods to work around the Church's confidentiality constraints to find the real killer. Also, Eddie defies Erin and the DA's office to get justice for a sexual assault survivor. The Reagan family ties are put to the test when Jamie and his nephew Joe Hill (Will Hochman) butt heads over a potentially dangerous use of an informant. Note: Nominated for an Edgar Award.
| 247 | 13 | "Cold Comfort" | Alex Zakrzewski | Kevin Riley | January 28, 2022 | 1213 | 6.10 |
Frank contends with a potentially dirty cop within his ranks when Danny's and Baez's investigation into a brutal gang assault on an NYPD detective reveals that the officer may be corrupt. Meanwhile, Eddie and Badillo track down the culprits behind the theft of valuable rare works from a celebrated bookstore. Also, Jamie begrudgingly joins Henry in investigating an old friend's death that Henry deems suspicious, and Erin snoops into the background of a new woman in Anthony's life when it is revealed that she has ties to the mob. However, Anthony is looking out for her after she tells him she wants to get on the right path. Perturbed by Erin's actions, Anthony asks to keep things strictly professional between the two in and out of work.
| 248 | 14 | "Allegiance" | Donald Thorin Jr. | Yasmine Cadet & Jack Ciapciak | February 25, 2022 | 1214 | 6.25 |
When Joe Hill (Will Hochman) overhears his lawyer girlfriend seemingly pressuring a witness not to take the stand, he brings it to Anthony and Erin's attention; they ultimately have to rescue the lawyer from her client who had kidnapped her. Erin takes Joe to the bowling alley she and Joe Sr used to go to every week, and she tells him more about his father. Baez takes Danny to a live taping for her favorite TV cooking personality, who drops dead from an allergic reaction to nut-based products. Baez posits the celebrity was poisoned, and she and Danny conclude that her estranged husband is behind the crime, and convinced the celebrity's assistant to spike her coffee. Frank visits the home of Lieutenant Raymond Moretti (Tony Danza) after a gunman shoots at the family due to his son's involvement with a gang. Moretti is prohibited from allowing his son in his home as a violation of NYPD rules. Having passed the sergeant's exam with flying colors, Eddie works an undercover stint with SVU and decides she wants to be a detective rather than a sergeant.
| 249 | 15 | "Where We Stand" | John Behring | Ian Biederman & Van B. Nguyen | March 4, 2022 | 1215 | 5.90 |
Frank contends with public outcry to defund the NYPD School Safety Division after a physical altercation between a student and a school officer goes viral. At first struggling with what to do while bashing heads with the principal and receiving backlash from the parents, Frank attends an assembly of the parents, to inform them that the officer has been reassigned. Just when the parents are celebrating, Frank reads a list of dangerous items the now removed officer confiscated while protecting the students, leaving the parents horrified that they just made the school less safe with their actions, and leaving the now panicked principal to deal with the parents. Danny and Baez help a father track down his daughter and ex-wife, who have both gone missing. They learn that the ex-wife is wanted by immigration for falling to answer several court summons she was sent. Danny and Baez locate the mother and daughter at the train station, they are able to convince the mother to return. Afterward Danny confronts the father as during the investigation, it was discovered that he stole his ex-wife's mail so she would get deported by missing the deportation hearings, and he could get full custody of their daughter. A disgusted Danny arrests the father, and the mother's deportation is postponed due to the revelation. Elsewhere, Erin and Anthony deal with the aftermath when Anthony tracks a serial criminal who was unexpectedly released from jail. Jamie is unsure of how to deal with inappropriate ethnic hazing among his officers in the precinct.
| 250 | 16 | "Guilt" | Ralph Hemecker | Brian Burns | March 11, 2022 | 1216 | 6.14 |
Frank, Baker, Garrett and Gormley experience feelings of guilt when Detective Angela Reddick (Ilfenesh Hadera), an officer they briefly worked with at 1PP, is shot after Frank reassigned her for not meshing with their team. Meanwhile, Eddie, Danny and Baez investigate a man's murder after Eddie and her partner respond to an altercation between the victim and a neighbor. Also, Anthony finds himself at a crossroads when he's offered a promotion that strains his friendship with Erin since Erin hints the surprise opportunity may be a scheme by her boss, DA Crawford.
| 251 | 17 | "Hidden Motive" | Bridget Moynahan | Daniel Truly | April 1, 2022 | 1217 | 5.67 |
Frank is blindsided when Mayor Chase bypasses him with a request for Jamie to head his security detail. Meanwhile, Danny and Baez arrive at the scene of what they believe is the murder of a wealthy college student. However, when Danny goes to examine the body, the girl is revealed to still be alive, and is rushed to the hospital. As she fights for her life, Danny and Baez try and find out who attacked her and left her for dead. Just when they seem to have hit a dead end, the victim wakes up and gives them the missing piece that leads them to a pair of thieves who are connected to the rental car company her parents used. While the driver drove the targets to the airport, his partner would enter the wealthy clients' houses and rob them. However, the plan went awry when the victim decided not to join her parents on their trip last minute. Also, Eddie experiences tension with her partner, Badillo (Ian Quinlan) when she arrests a protestor against his wishes, and Anthony scrambles to help his half brother when he fears money woes are leading his sibling down the wrong path.
| 252 | 18 | "Long Lost" | Ralph Hemecker | Kevin Riley & Nicole Abraham | April 8, 2022 | 1218 | 5.93 |
Danny and Baez race to find a boy, who was abducted on his way to school. Meanwhile, an encounter with an old law school rival leads Erin to look into an alleged wrongful conviction. Frank faces a dilemma when a Marine veteran, who became a local celebrity for saving a woman's life, asks him to make an exception to the NYPD recruitment age limit so that he can join the force. Also, Jamie is torn over whether to report a sergeant close to Eddie after witnessing her punching a fellow officer.
| 253 | 19 | "Tangled Up in Blue" | Doug Aarniokoski | Teleplay by : Kevin Wade; Story by : Kevin Wade & Graham Thiel | April 29, 2022 | 1219 | 5.85 |
When Erin is stalked by Lenny Katz, who was recently released from prison after serving 12 years, she enlists Anthony and Danny to investigate her office's role in his sentencing. Also, Frank navigates multiple family issues as he deals with a troubling medical diagnosis for Henry as well as Jamie's DUI. Meanwhile, Jamie works to save his badge when he is caught driving under the influence after he is unknowingly given drugs at a party.
| 254 | 20 | "Silver Linings" | Ralph Hemecker | Siobhan Byrne O'Connor | May 6, 2022 | 1220 | 6.23 |
Danny and Jamie join forces with their nephew Joe Hill (Will Hochman) when Jamie and Joe's search for an undocumented trafficked teenaged girl converges with Danny and Baez's investigation into the bombing murder of Eleana Marquez, a pregnant woman in witness protection from Arturo Muñoz; hospital doctors are able to save the baby. After the investigation concludes, Baez adopts the newborn baby. Meanwhile, Frank and Erin butt heads when Frank calls out the district attorney's office for instituting a new rule that classifies armed robbery as a misdemeanor—a mandate that has immediate ramifications for Eddie and Badillo. Erin invites Anthony to Sunday dinner, where she informs the family she plans to run for District Attorney. Note: Nominated for the Movieguide Awards

== Ratings ==
Viewership and ratings per episode of Blue Bloods season 12
| No. | Title | Air date | Rating (18–49) | Viewers (millions) | DVR (18–49) | DVR viewers (millions) | Total (18–49) | Total viewers (millions) |
|---|---|---|---|---|---|---|---|---|
| 1 | "Hate Is Hate" | October 1, 2021 | 0.5 | 6.30 | —N/a | —N/a | —N/a | —N/a |
| 2 | "Times Like These" | October 8, 2021 | 0.4 | 6.00 | —N/a | —N/a | —N/a | —N/a |
| 3 | "Protective Instincts" | October 15, 2021 | 0.4 | 5.96 | —N/a | —N/a | —N/a | —N/a |
| 4 | "True Blue" | October 22, 2021 | 0.5 | 6.05 | 0.3 | 3.81 | 0.8 | 9.86 |
| 5 | "Good Intentions" | November 5, 2021 | 0.5 | 6.20 | —N/a | —N/a | —N/a | —N/a |
| 6 | "Be Smart or Be Dead" | November 12, 2021 | 0.4 | 6.10 | —N/a | —N/a | —N/a | —N/a |
| 7 | "USA Today" | November 19, 2021 | 0.5 | 5.79 | 0.4 | 3.87 | 0.9 | 9.67 |
| 8 | "Reality Check" | December 3, 2021 | 0.4 | 5.81 | 0.4 | 3.64 | 0.7 | 9.45 |
| 9 | "Firewall" | December 10, 2021 | 0.5 | 5.77 | 0.3 | 3.76 | 0.8 | 9.53 |
| 10 | "Old Friends" | January 7, 2022 | 0.5 | 6.07 | —N/a | —N/a | —N/a | —N/a |
| 11 | "On the Arm" | January 14, 2022 | 0.5 | 6.44 | —N/a | —N/a | —N/a | —N/a |
| 12 | "The Reagan Way" | January 21, 2022 | 0.5 | 6.27 | —N/a | —N/a | —N/a | —N/a |
| 13 | "Cold Comfort" | January 28, 2022 | 0.5 | 6.10 | —N/a | —N/a | —N/a | —N/a |
| 14 | "Allegiance" | February 25, 2022 | 0.5 | 6.25 | —N/a | —N/a | —N/a | —N/a |
| 15 | "Where We Stand" | March 4, 2022 | 0.4 | 5.90 | —N/a | —N/a | —N/a | —N/a |
| 16 | "Guilt" | March 11, 2022 | 0.5 | 6.14 | —N/a | —N/a | —N/a | —N/a |
| 17 | "Hidden Motive" | April 1, 2022 | 0.4 | 5.67 | —N/a | —N/a | —N/a | —N/a |
| 18 | "Long Lost" | April 8, 2022 | 0.4 | 5.93 | —N/a | —N/a | —N/a | —N/a |
| 19 | "Tangled Up in Blue" | April 29, 2022 | 0.4 | 5.85 | —N/a | —N/a | —N/a | —N/a |
| 20 | "Silver Linings" | May 6, 2022 | 0.4 | 6.23 | —N/a | —N/a | —N/a | —N/a |
