= Blue Bloods season 9 =

Season of American television series Blue Bloods

Blue Bloods
- Season 9
- Season 9 U.S. DVD cover
- No. of episodes: 22

Release
- Original network: CBS
- Original release: September 28, 2018 – May 10, 2019

Season chronology
- ← Previous; Season 8 Next → Season 10

The ninth season of Blue Bloods, a police procedural drama series created by Robin Green and Mitchell Burgess, premiered on CBS September 28, 2018. The season concluded on May 10, 2019 and contained 22 episodes.

== Cast ==
Donnie Wahlberg (Danny Reagan), Bridget Moynahan (Erin Reagan), Will Estes (Jamie Reagan), and Len Cariou (Henry Reagan) are first credited. Sami Gayle (Nicky Reagan-Boyle) is credited next, marking the fifth season she has been included in the opening credits. Tom Selleck (Frank Reagan) receives an "and" billing at the close of the main title sequence.

Marisa Ramirez, as Danny's partner Detective Maria Baez, and Vanessa Ray, as Jamie's partner Eddie Janko, continue to receive "also starring" billing for season 9. Gregory Jbara as Deputy Commissioner of Public Information Garrett Moore, Robert Clohessy as Lt. Sidney Gormley, and Abigail Hawk as Detective Abigail Baker, Frank's primary aide, appear regularly and receive "special guest star" billing.

=== Main ===
- Tom Selleck as NYPD Police Commissioner Francis "Frank" Reagan
- Donnie Wahlberg as Detective 1st Grade Daniel "Danny" Reagan
- Bridget Moynahan as ADA Erin Reagan
- Will Estes as Officer/ Sergeant Jamison "Jamie" Reagan
- Len Cariou as New York City Police Commissioner Henry Reagan (Retired)
- Sami Gayle as Nicole "Nicky" Reagan-Boyle
- Marisa Ramirez as Detective 1st Grade Maria Baez
- Vanessa Ray as Officer Edit "Eddie" Janko

=== Recurring ===
- Abigail Hawk as Detective 1st Grade Abigail Baker
- Gregory Jbara as Deputy Commissioner of Public Information Garrett Moore
- Robert Clohessy as Lieutenant Sidney "Sid" Gormley
- Stacy Keach as Archbishop Kevin Kearns
- Steve Schirripa as DA Investigator Anthony Abetemarco
- Lauren Patten as Officer Rachel Witten
- Peter Hermann as Jack Boyle
- Yasha Jackson as Maya Thomas
- Bebe Neuwirth as Kelly Peterson
- Callie Thorne as Maggie Gibson
- Tony Terraciano as Jack Reagan
- Andrew Terraciano as Sean Regan
- Treat Williams as Lenny Ross

== Episodes ==
No. overall	No. in season	Title	Directed by	Written by	Original release date	Prod. code	U.S. viewers (millions)
178	1	"Playing with Fire"	David M. Barrett	Siobhan Byrne O'Connor	September 28, 2018	901	8.79
Danny takes on a personal case involving drug cartel member Luis Delgado (Lou Diamond Phillips), whom Danny believes is responsible for torching his former house. Delgado smugly admits to being behind the deed, while also hinting that the cartel may have had something to do with the death of Danny's wife Linda. Danny nails Delgado in a drug bust, but ultimately cuts him loose in front of his crew, making him look like a snitch; this (presumably) precipitates Delgado's murder by the following morning. Erin is given a promotion in the DA's office but finds herself in a challenging situation when both Danny and Jamie ask for her help in their investigations. Jamie and Eddie investigate an arson, where Eddie narrowly escapes serious injury. Also, Frank and Jamie have a disagreement when Jamie refuses to stop riding with his fiancée; Jamie later reveals to his father that he passed the sergeant's exam at the top of the list, and intends to take the promotion.
179	2	"Meet the New Boss"	Robert Harmon	Ian Biederman	October 5, 2018	902	8.57
Gormley looks to Danny and Baez for help tracking down a former NYPD detective he believes may be a threat to Frank's safety. The detective, Ray Cross, was mixed up with drug money, but Frank let him retire with his pension. However, Cross held a grudge for being kicked off the force, and he even gets his son, a young office worker at 1PP, involved, which ultimately gets the young man shot. Erin navigates office politics when she chooses to reopen a closed case that the late Monica Graham was forced by her boss to drop. The boss was close friends with the defendant, a wealthy man accused of abusing his wife. Jamie is transferred to the 29th precinct where his new captain, Espinoza (Luis Antonio Ramos) introduces him to some of the problematic cops working there. After weeding out the bad apples, Jamie prepares a list of cops he would like to have transferred to his new precinct as well; Eddie is among them, but she asks not to be transferred due to wanting to make it on her own as a cop, like she has done since she started on the force. Also, Frank and Baker team up to investigate a complaint about an SVU detective, brought to their attention by Kelly Peterson.
180	3	"Mind Games"	John Behring	Brian Burns	October 12, 2018	903	8.31
While Danny and Maria investigate a case involving a woman who shot her husband while drunk, Danny's instincts tell him there is more to the story. Upon finding out the husband was having an affair with a woman he said to her was their marriage counselor, Danny also uncovers that he made his wife think she shot him, and he arrests both the husband and the mistress. Elsewhere, Anthony ignores Erin's orders to drop an assault case after he finds out new information from the victim. This makes Erin look bad in front of her new department, resulting in her scolding Anthony, and causing a rift between them until they later make peace. Also, Frank holds an emergency drill for his inner circle (though Garrett is initially left out after being held up at a meeting), while Jamie and Eddie navigate their changing work-life dynamic. Eddie changes her mind about working at Jamie's precinct after overhearing some of the cops badmouth him in private, and she requests a transfer there.
181	4	"Blackout"	Ralph Hemecker	Kevin Riley & Allie Solomon	October 19, 2018	904	8.46
When New York City experiences a major blackout, cops scramble to contain the resulting chaos, and Frank uncovers some unpleasant truths about his department in the aftermath. Chief Russo, a friend of Gormley's, left a particularly high-crime neighborhood without police aid; although he received orders from the mayor to do this, Frank fires Russo nonetheless. Jamie and Eddie question the line between work and their relationship when Eddie wants to go undercover to capture an abusive thief who targets drunk women leaving bars. This leads to their first fight as an engaged couple. The crook is eventually caught, but the detective overseeing the case is scolded by Jamie for waiting too long to make an arrest. Meanwhile, Erin crosses her boss when she refuses to prosecute a woman accused of assisting her husband in a robbery, believing the woman did so under duress. The husband is revealed to have a history of abusing his wife, and she wanted to protect their son. Also, Danny and Baez investigate the murder of a woman in an apartment that wasn't her own. The tenant says he never knew her, but he is revealed to have loaned his apartment to her via an app. The prime suspect, his ex-girlfriend, got jealous over the idea of another woman being in his apartment, so the detectives race to question her before she gets tipped off by her ex-boyfriend. However, she commits suicide before they find her.
182	5	"Thicker Than Water"	Jackeline Tejada	Daniel Truly	October 26, 2018	905	7.90
Danny and Baez investigate a murder attempt against a celebrated fertility doctor with a seemingly pristine reputation. One of the young workers in his office quit after her first shift upon finding out the doctor was actually her biological father; the doctor used his own sperm on many occasions instead of the actual father's. Also, Sean calls Eddie for help after getting in trouble for truancy and underage drinking, earning the ire of Danny due to her not telling him about the situation. Jamie believes that Sean is acting in a similar way Jamie himself did when Danny left for the Marines; that he is acting out in an attempt to get his college-bound brother Jack to stay home to "keep him in line." Danny invites Jamie and Eddie to his house as Jack prepares to leave in order to apologize for his outburst, and he later compliments Jamie's decision to marry Eddie. Erin helps Anthony find justice after a date night leads to his wallet and Rolex being stolen; she finds out about it when Anthony's work-related credit card was used to make a major purchase. Anthony is initially reluctant to prosecute, fearing what the situation would do to his reputation, but with Erin's help, he catches the culprit. Also, Frank ties up loose ends with an old friend who believes a supervisor reassigned his son and wants said supervisor fired immediately. However, the son asked for a reassignment, saying he never wanted to be a cop and that he joined the force for his father's sake.
183	6	"Trust"	Alex Zakrzewski	Jack Ciapciak & Kevin Wade	November 2, 2018	906	8.73
Eddie and her new partner, Maya (Yasha Thompson), clash with Jamie on the job when they fail to intervene in a public dispute at a convenience store. A young man physically assaults a woman after the store owner had first asked Eddie and Maya to let him go, but after the assault the owner says he wanted the man arrested. He later admits to lying, stating he employed the young man, who was not a citizen, without pay. Also, Danny and Baez investigate the death of a college freshman at a fraternity party. What is initially presumed as a hazing case turns into a homicide investigation when one of the frat boys is revealed to have shoved the victim, who tried to kiss him, leading to blunt force trauma to the head. Frank battles a potential lawsuit when a longtime inspector accuses the department of reverse racism and ageism, having been passed up for a promotion. The promotion was ultimately given to an Asian American woman whom Frank insists was more qualified, stating it wasn't even close. Elsewhere, Erin agrees to let Anthony work an off-the-books case investigating insurance fraud at his mother's nursing home, but Anthony later enlists Henry's help without telling Erin.
184	7	"By Hook or by Crook"	David M. Barrett	Siobhan Byrne O'Connor	November 9, 2018	907	8.97
Things get personal for Danny when Luis Delgado (Lou Diamond Phillips), the drug cartel hitman responsible for torching his house, resurfaces. Delgado reveals he is an informant for the DEA, forcing Danny to have him cough up his cartel leader in a drug money transfer. However, Delgado plays them, leading to an explosion before he goes into the wind. Attempting to apprehend Delgado at his house, Danny is told by Delgado via video camera that the cartel intentionally caused Linda's helicopter to crash. Elsewhere, an attack on two officers in the line of duty directly impacts Baker, as one of the wounded officers is her husband (he eventually recovers). Erin becomes involved, as she posted bail for the man who turned out to be the shooter after he was arrested for a non-violent drug offense. His violent history in Mexico was not uncovered by the DA's office, leading to a wedge between Frank and Erin. Also, Eddie reluctantly introduces Jamie to her mother, Lena (Christine Ebersole), who only worries about the money Eddie's man makes and the title of his job. Jamie privately goes to Lena's apartment to set her straight, and Lena gives her approval by telling Eddie that Jamie came back, making him the only one of Eddie's romantic interests that she couldn't scare off.
185	8	"Stirring the Pot"	Robert Harmon	Ian Biederman	November 16, 2018	908	8.63
Erin and Frank clash over new legislation from the district attorney's office that undermines Frank's policies on marijuana arrests. Meanwhile, Erin is at odds with Governor Mendez (David Zayas) over questionable sex-trafficking laws that mandate testimony from the victim in court to make a conviction. Erin eventually convinces Mendez to amend the law. Also, Danny gets shot in the arm during a raid. He risks his badge to protect a friend from losing his after said friend freezes during the shootout, but he ultimately resigns from the force, citing his newfound fatherhood as the reason. Elsewhere, an officer under Jamie's command gets injured during a shootout, causing Jamie to question whether he's capable of continuing as a sergeant, even after the injured officer and others agree that Jamie acted by the book.
186	9	"Handcuffs"	Heather Cappiello	Brian Burns	November 30, 2018	909	8.43
When a video surfaces of cops being harassed by a group of people at a housing complex, Frank orders a raid to round up anyone with an outstanding warrant, against Garrett's advice. During the raid, Eddie arrests a man who turns out to be the prime suspect in a cold case. Also, Danny is approached by Molly Chavez (Stephanie Andujar, see 8x20 "Your Six"), a woman he put in jail, who asks for his help keeping her baby brother out of trouble. The woman later shows a romantic interest in Danny, who still shows a reluctance to date again following his wife's death. Also, Nicky's new boyfriend has ulterior motives; he is the nephew of a criminal Erin is prosecuting, and he only got close to Nicky so he could hinder Erin's case. Nicky finds out by secretly recording him doing so, and she promptly breaks up with him.
187	10	"Authority Figures"	Eric Laneuville	Kevin Riley	December 7, 2018	910	8.90
When a video of a sting executed by the NYPD is leaked to the press, the press and public are incensed. Despite the claims of entrapment, Frank focuses on finding the cop who leaked the video. Gormley loses his cool at a press conference when reporters seem to badmouth the officers involved, leading to an argument with Frank. Also, Eddie retaliates against a co-worker who is pranking Jamie, leading to questions about their relationship by other cops in their precinct, including Eddie's partner Maya. Danny and Baez investigate the murder of a tabloid writer named Charlotte, who worked in the hip-hop scene. A recording artist, Cameron Gooding, becomes a suspect when he admits that Charlotte had written scathing articles about him recently, but it is later revealed that Cameron and Charlotte were seeing each other, and that Cameron's business partner is responsible for her death, calling it "taking care of business". Elsewhere, Erin gives a high-profile case to a young ADA under her tutelage, whose inexperience leads to the case being compromised. However, it is revealed that the suspect threatened the ADA's family.
188	11	"Disrupted"	David M. Barrett	Daniel Truly	January 4, 2019	911	8.60
Frank's breakfast is interrupted by a group of community activists. The group's leader, Corey Vallejo (Juani Feliz), accuses Frank of a hit-and-run when the vehicle he is riding in runs over the foot of a young man named Malik, but interrogation by Gormley confirms Malik had set it all up. Frank admonishes Corey before giving her a second chance to redeem herself. Also, Jamie and a rookie officer happen upon a heated argument between a cab driver and a passenger. The driver, a former cop, was driving without a license and carrying a weapon during the argument, but Jamie decides to cut him a break. This ultimately backfires when the man shoots someone over an unrelated dispute. Upon learning from a friend that his ex-wife Vivian is seeing a therapist, Anthony is confronted by a psychiatric patient who goes off the rails; after the patient makes a run for it, Anthony checks on the doctor and her secretary in the office, the latter of which dies. Anthony gets personally involved, since Vivian and their daughter are now in danger, but detectives are able to collar the perp before he gets to them. After this, Anthony and Vivian agree to be more civil towards each other. Elsewhere, Danny's new neighbor from Texas, Ron, is angry upon learning his daughter Jennifer is dating "a kid named Reagan." Exchanges between the two fathers show that they don't see eye to eye, but after Ron gets jumped and Danny helps him out, Ron thanks him with tickets to a hockey game, saying that Sean befriended Jennifer when nobody else did and asking him to make sure Sean gets Jennifer home from the game by curfew.
189	12	"Milestones"	Heather Cappiello	Allie Solomon	January 11, 2019	912	9.05
After a former officer, Rachel Witten, waits on Frank at a restaurant, he feels guilty about the circumstances surrounding why she was fired, and he tries to reinstate her (see episode 8x15 "Legacy"). Despite Witten's initial reluctance, she is later reinstated to the NYPD. Also, Danny and Baez investigate the murder of a star college basketball player linked to sports betting. Erin seeks justice in an apparent DUI in which the perp is a teen, Samantha Wright, whose mother provides proof to the court that she had an undiagnosed mental illness. Samantha had taken the drugs prescribed to her, then got behind the wheel and accidentally fatally struck a child. Erin's decision to recommend rehabilitation instead of charging Samantha with murder doesn't sit well with the mother of the child that was killed. Elsewhere, Jamie rides with an older beat cop who advises him, based on his own failed marriage, that saving money is most important in a relationship. When Jamie and Eddie try to find a wedding venue, Jamie voices his concerns over finances to Eddie, who misinterprets what he says as him not caring at all about their wedding.
190	13	"Ripple Effect"	Ralph Hemecker	Siobhan Byrne O'Connor	February 1, 2019	913	9.13
A medium, Maggie (Callie Thorne), approaches Danny and Baez, claiming to know the true events behind a woman's suicide, revealed later to be a murder staged to look like suicide. The killer, a sex offender, commits suicide himself after a high-speed chase. Also, Eddie is taken wedding dress shopping by Erin and Nicky, and settles on the most beautiful (and expensive) one she finds. She then asks to ride with Jamie, and a woman asks them to help her diabetic son who fell unconscious. The mother had bought cheap insulin online in desperation, not knowing the vial contained only water, but the doctor believes she had neglected and endangered the boy. Jamie and Eddie prove she wasn't at fault, and Eddie even uses her wedding dress funds to get the woman a year's worth of real insulin. Frank goes after a man he believes is laundering money from a charity, given the man's use of false testimonials from Frank himself, but he then goes against the wishes of the Archbishop (Stacy Keach) when he gives the man a second chance. Erin's ex-husband asks her for help with an assault and robbery case in which the victim is his ex-girlfriend. Though Erin is upset over him not telling her the full story (leading once again to some tension), the case is solved and they mend fences.
191	14	"My Brother's Keeper"	Doug Aarniokoski	Ian Biederman	February 8, 2019	914	7.62
It's Reagan versus Reagan when Danny goes against Jamie's direct order during a hostage negotiation. Things nearly get physical between the brothers at Sunday dinner, but Henry gets them to make up. Also, Nicky asks Erin for help when her friend is in jeopardy of losing his scholarship because of a crime he didn't commit; though Erin is reluctant to get involved in a personal matter involving a family member (and Nicky's own relationship with the boy further complicates matters), Erin and Anthony are able to prove the young man didn't do anything wrong. Also, Frank helps Officer Green, a distraught cop who accidentally shot an innocent girl during an ambush; the grand jury declines to indict Green, but the overwhelming guilt over collateral damage combined with the separation from his wife and children prompts him to turn in his shield, then point a gun at his own head. However, Frank is able to talk him out of committing suicide.
192	15	"Blues"	David M. Barrett	Brian Burns	February 15, 2019	915	8.93
While off duty, Danny encounters a gas station robbery in progress and is forced to use his weapon, leaving him shaken and his family and co-workers concerned. Though it wasn't the first shooting Danny was involved in, this one takes a particular toll on him in that Linda was always there to comfort him every time he was involved in a shooting, but she isn't anymore. During this, Danny and Baez investigate the murder of another young man whose mother seems especially out of sorts over the circumstances. Also, Eddie apprehends a turnstile jumper who pleads for leniency by offering information on a missing weapon that's vital to one of Erin's cases, leading to her working with Anthony for the first time. Elsewhere, Frank learns that Inspector Clifford, a top officer in his department, has a dark past as a gang member. Clifford was arrested for robbery when he was 15, and though he turned his life around, the crime was unknown to the department and would have made him ineligible to be hired. Frank ultimately decides to keep Clifford on the job because of how good a cop he's become, rather than fire him because of his past.
193	16	"Past Tense"	Rachel Feldman	Daniel Truly	March 8, 2019	916	8.26
After a woman is strangled in her apartment, Danny and Baez turn to her daughter, Margo (Lyrica Okano), for help, but instead she complicates the investigation by pointing them towards their neighbors who all despised the woman, in an effort to hide the fact that she murdered her mother. Also, parole officer Don Vorhees, who Jamie and Eddie arrested for abusing his power over parolees (see episode 8x13 "Erasing History"), launches a smear campaign against them; he posts racist propaganda under Jamie's name and stomps into Jamie's precinct to file a bogus harassment claim against him and Eddie after the officers confront him at his address. However, his sister framed him for the posts. Also, a mobster shows up in the DA's office claiming to be Anthony's long-lost half-brother and offering assistance in the prosecution of his former boss.
194	17	"Two-Faced"	Ralph Hemecker	Kevin Riley	March 15, 2019	917	7.78
Frank's longtime friend Lenny (Treat Williams) reveals to him that an upcoming exposé will air some of the NYPD's dirty laundry. Also, Erin must decide how to charge a doctor whose experimental treatments led to the death of his terminally ill daughter Sarah; the doctor's ex-wife demands that he be charged for murder, but he admits to Erin and Anthony that Sarah begged him to end it despite his attempts to save her. His ex-wife says that Sarah wouldn't have wanted her father to spend the rest of his life behind bars, so Erin recommends to the judge that he be charged with manslaughter instead of murder. Danny and Baez investigate the mysterious overdose of a promising artist that turns out not to be accidental. Elsewhere, Eddie and Maya arrest a man on drug charges, but he reveals to them that he knows information about a corrupt officer in their squad that takes money from crime scenes. Eddie brings it to Jamie's attention, who instructs her to leave the matter with IAB, but Jamie organizes a fake crime scene disguised as a way to figure out the guilty party. This reveals that Maya is the one stealing money, and he has her publicly arrested during roll call.
195	18	"Rectify"	Robert Harmon	Allie Solomon	April 5, 2019	918	7.90
Frank must decide whether to adopt a more rigorous fitness test for the NYPD after an incident where Officer Witten's backup could not keep up with a chase, putting her in danger. This leads to a wedge between Garrett and Sid regarding the issue of fitness. Also, Danny is hesitant to pursue a cold case after learning that the original detective was Sid Gormley. Danny, Maria, and Sid work together to solve the case. Anthony begs Erin to stall a murder trial against a longtime foster mother so that he can gather more evidence; a foster child named Sam admits to Anthony that he wasn't with the suspect at the time of the incident, which is what he originally told the detectives, and Anthony later takes Sam in after seeing how poorly he is treated by his new foster mother. Meanwhile, Eddie (now partnered with Witten) is invited by the latter to join an NYPD women's sports league, but Jamie, having flashbacks to the Blue Templar and feeling like the others in the league could potentially take advantage of the soon-to-be daughter-in-law of the Police Commissioner, disapproves, angering Eddie. Danny reveals Jamie's reasoning to Eddie by opening up about Joe's death and says he'll talk to Jamie about it. Jamie later changes his stance on Eddie joining a fraternal organization.
196	19	"Common Enemies"	David M. Barrett	Siobhan Byrne O'Connor	April 12, 2019	919	8.09
After someone breaks into Luis Delgado's home and kills his wife, Luis and Danny team up to take down Jose Rojas (Danny Trejo), the vicious murderer who may also be responsible for Linda's death. Luis meets with Rojas while on a cell phone acting as a wire, but Rojas, correctly surmising something is up with his former protege, dumps Luis's phone into a drink. A gunfight between detectives and Rojas's crew soon ensues, while Luis and Rojas duke it out before Danny approaches. Luis urges Danny to kill Rojas after they find out he was responsible for both of their wives' deaths, but Danny arrests him instead. He visits Luis in jail to share condolences for their losses, and Luis gratefully accepts Danny's offer to watch out for his kids. Danny then visits Maggie (Callie Thorne, see 9x13 "Ripple Effect") to confide in her about his wife, and she gently urges him to let go of Linda, saying he kept his promise to her while she was alive; Danny removes his wedding band and places it in a small bag Maggie gives to him. Also, Frank finally meets Eddie's mother Lena (Christine Ebersole), who has been having issues with other tenants at her apartment complex due to her husband Armin's Ponzi scheme. Jamie and Erin are at odds after Jamie seeks her help charging a man who confessed to him while under the influence. Things get tense at Erin's office, and later at Sunday dinner, but with Anthony's help, Jamie brings the guilty party to justice. Anthony then lays down the law for Erin and Jamie, saying they need to work on their individual issues to better understand the challenges each faces on the job.
197	20	"Strange Bedfellows"	Dean White	Ian Biederman	April 26, 2019	920	7.78
Erin must convince Frank to back a new state police bill as part of a bargain she made with Governor Mendez (David Zayas, see 9x08 "Stirring the Pot"). Frank refuses Erin's request, which earns Mendez's ire; he threatens to harm her reputation if she doesn't get her father on board with his bill, as he feels that Erin made a promise to him in exchange for amending sex-trafficking laws. However, Mendez convinces Frank on a compromise himself, making Erin feel as though her father left her out to dry regarding the matter. Also, Danny and Baez pursue the same perp twice after the DA's office is unconvinced by their initial lineup, where Danny declines assistance from another detective. Anthony warns Danny about potentially breaking protocol, leading to yet another argument between the two, until Anthony helps Danny collar the perp in a more by-the-book fashion, and Frank faces a challenge when a cop killer comes up for parole. The cop's son, a friend of Sid's who followed in his father's footsteps, threatens to get justice when the killer goes free, leading to Sid visiting the man in jail to warn him about what awaits him if he does get parole. This creates another rift between Sid and Garrett; after the latter advises against meeting with a cop killer in jail, he is offended that Sid continuously makes him feel like an odd man out in the group because he's never worn a uniform. Elsewhere, Eddie and Rachel save a baby's life, but the father bolts as soon as he sees the police. The baby seems to take a liking to Eddie, who likewise becomes personally involved in the child services case. These events make Eddie consider her and Jamie's future, as she had always been on the fence about having children, but the couple agrees to take the major steps in their relationship only when they are both 100% certain about it.
198	21	"Identity"	John Behring	Daniel Truly	May 3, 2019	921	8.13
DNA evidence in a murder case leads Danny and Baez to identical twins with identical alibis. When the detectives uncover the truth from one of the twin's ex-girlfriends, they go to arrest the suspects, but upon agreement from both twins, one shoots the other in the chest right before turning the gun on himself. Also, Frank learns from Corey Vallejo (Juani Feliz, see 9x11 "Disrupted") that Nicky is interviewing for a job at the Justice Coalition, which he rarely sees eye-to-eye with. Frank later finds out that Corey set it up as a way to get her brother a job with the NYPD. Henry finds out a package left for him on his front door is stolen; the package contained an old locket of Betty's that he had repaired for Nicky as a graduation present. His neighbor provides footage from her security camera, and they learn the thief is her granddaughter, an addict. Henry encourages her to give the girl a second chance, but the girl dies of an overdose soon before rehab. Meanwhile, Eddie's father Armin (William Sadler) reaches out to Jamie from prison, requesting that he be there to walk her down the aisle. Though he is skeptical of Armin's intentions at first, Jamie asks Danny and Erin to help him make it happen, then gets the green light from Eddie. The couple visits Armin, where he says to Eddie, "Thank you, my angel. You've always looked out for me", words that Eddie recognizes from every time he's asked her to cover for him over the years. Thus, Eddie refuses her father's request and storms out with Jamie following.
199	22	"Something Blue"	David M. Barrett	Brian Burns	May 10, 2019	922	8.48
Jamie and Eddie's wedding day finally arrives, but Eddie is at odds with Erin over conflicting witness accounts. Eddie gets the wrong idea from Erin interviewing her to figure out the truth, and Jamie's attempt to ease the situation makes Eddie feel further insulted. Anthony and Eddie later find out that the witness lied under oath, and Erin apologizes to Eddie. Also, Danny and Baez investigate the murder of a young man whose ex-girlfriend, who was obsessed with him, is the prime suspect. She desperately swears that she had nothing to do with the man's death, and surveillance footage from another building's camera shows another ex was responsible. Elsewhere, Garrett and Gormley are offended when Baker privately presents a plan to Frank, and a heated argument later ensues. This forces Frank to have them switch jobs for a day while coming to an agreement on Baker's plan. All three struggle, later admitting they were out of line, and they make up the following morning. Frank also stresses over delivering the toast for Jamie and Eddie's rehearsal dinner; the entire Reagan family, Lena Janko (Christine Ebersole), Rachel, Baez, and Anthony are in attendance, with Archbishop Kearns (Stacy Keach) officiating. The episode ends with Frank walking Eddie down the aisle at her request.

== Ratings ==
Viewership and ratings per episode of Blue Bloods season 9
No.	Title	Air date	Rating/share (18–49)	Viewers (millions)	DVR (18–49)	DVR viewers (millions)	Total (18–49)	Total viewers (millions)
1	"Playing with Fire"	September 28, 2018	0.9/4	8.79	0.6	4.56	1.5	13.35
2	"Meet the New Boss"	October 5, 2018	0.8/4	8.57	0.6	4.35	1.4	12.93
3	"Mind Games"	October 12, 2018	0.8/4	8.31	0.6	4.27	1.4	12.59
4	"Blackout"	October 19, 2018	0.8/4	8.46	0.7	4.64	1.5	13.10
5	"Thicker Than Water"	October 26, 2018	0.7/3	7.90	0.6	4.40	1.3	12.30
6	"Trust"	November 2, 2018	0.8/3	8.73	0.6	4.22	1.4	12.95
7	"By Hook or by Crook"	November 9, 2018	0.8/3	8.97	0.6	4.30	1.4	13.28
8	"Stirring the Pot"	November 16, 2018	0.9/4	8.63	0.6	4.39	1.5	13.02
9	"Handcuffs"	November 30, 2018	0.8/4	8.43	0.6	4.43	1.4	12.86
10	"Authority Figures"	December 7, 2018	0.9/4	8.90	0.6	4.18	1.5	13.08
11	"Disrupted"	January 4, 2019	0.8/4	8.60	0.6	4.24	1.4	12.84
12	"Milestones"	January 11, 2019	0.8/4	9.05	0.7	4.19	1.5	13.24
13	"Ripple Effect"	February 1, 2019	0.8/4	9.13	0.7	4.68	1.5	13.81
14	"My Brother's Keeper"	February 8, 2019	0.7/4	7.62	0.7	4.46	1.4	12.08
15	"Blues"	February 15, 2019	0.8/4	8.93	0.7	4.53	1.5	13.46
16	"Past Tense"	March 8, 2019	0.9/5	8.26	0.6	4.61	1.5	12.87
17	"Two-Faced"	March 15, 2019	0.6/3	7.78	0.7	4.36	1.3	12.21
18	"Rectify"	April 5, 2019	0.8/4	7.90	0.6	4.60	1.4	12.50
19	"Common Enemies"	April 12, 2019	0.7/4	8.09	0.6	4.45	1.3	12.54
20	"Strange Bedfellows"	April 26, 2019	0.7/4	7.78	0.5	4.25	1.2	12.03
21	"Identity"	May 3, 2019	0.7/4	8.13	0.7	4.25	1.4	12.39
22	"Something Blue"	May 10, 2019	0.8/4	8.48	0.5	4.27	1.3	12.75
