= Blue Bloods season 13 =

Season of television series

Blue Bloods
- Season 13
- No. of episodes: 21

Release
- Original network: CBS
- Original release: October 7, 2022 – May 19, 2023

Season chronology
- ← Previous; Season 12 Next → Season 14

The thirteenth season of Blue Bloods, a police procedural drama series created by Robin Green and Mitchell Burgess, premiered on CBS on October 7, 2022.

== Cast ==
=== Main ===
- Tom Selleck as New York City Police Commissioner Francis "Frank" Reagan
- Donnie Wahlberg as Detective 1st Grade Daniel "Danny" Reagan
- Bridget Moynahan as ADA Erin Reagan
- Will Estes as Sergeant Jamison "Jamie" Reagan
- Len Cariou as New York City Police Commissioner Henry Reagan (Retired)
- Marisa Ramirez as Detective 1st Grade Maria Baez
- Vanessa Ray as Officer Edit "Eddie" Janko

=== Recurring ===
- Abigail Hawk as Detective 1st Grade Abigail Baker
- Gregory Jbara as Deputy Commissioner of Public Information Garrett Moore
- Robert Clohessy as Lieutenant Sidney "Sid" Gormley
- Steve Schirripa as DA Investigator Anthony Abetemarco
- Will Hochman as Detective 3rd Grade Joseph "Joe" Hill
- Andrew Terraciano as Sean Reagan
- Roslyn Ruff as D.A. Kimberly "Kim" Crawford
- Ian Quinlan as Officer Luis Badillo
- Stacy Keach as Archbishop Kevin Kearns
- Peter Hermann as Jack Boyle
- Stephanie Kurtzuba as Captain Paula McNichols
- Dylan Walsh as Mayor Peter Chase
- Callie Thorne as Maggie Gibson
- James Hiroyuki Liao as Lieutenant Fleming
- Steven Maier as Officer Zach "Christo" Christodoulopoulos
- Treat Williams as Lenny Ross

=== Guest ===
- Bonnie Somerville as Paula Hill
- Lauren Patten as Rachel Witten
- Lyle Lovett as Texas Ranger Waylon Gates
- Larry Manetti as Sam Velucci
- Sami Gayle as Nicky Reagan-Boyle
- Tony Terraciano as Jack Reagan
- Jennifer Esposito as Chief of Police Jackie Curatola
- Dario Vazquez as Andre Castillo

== Episodes ==
| No. overall | No. in season | Title | Directed by | Written by | Original release date | Prod. code | U.S. viewers (millions) |
|---|---|---|---|---|---|---|---|
| 255 | 1 | "Keeping the Faith" | Alex Zakrzewski | Siobhan Byrne O'Connor & Kevin Wade | October 7, 2022 | 1301 | 6.40 |
Eddie, Badillo, and Jamie work a domestic violence case associated with an investigation worked by Danny, Baez, and Anthony for a trial Erin is leading. Jamie is shot during the case, putting his life in danger as the rest of the Reagans gather at the hospital. Captain McNichols (Stephanie Kurtzuba) also visits to offer support; Eddie requests that she and Jamie stay in the same precinct rather than one being forced to transfer. Joe Hill (Will Hochman) also helps with the investigation, while Frank and Archbishop Kearns (Stacy Keach) go undercover as regular people to gain insight into how the public views cops. Elsewhere, Erin is introduced to a friend of Jack Boyle (Peter Hermann) who promises a large donation in support of her run for District Attorney, which later brings up old feelings between the two exes.
| 256 | 2 | "First Blush" | Alex Zakrzewski | Teleplay by : Brian Burns; Story by : Brian Burns and James Nuciforo | October 14, 2022 | 1303 | 6.06 |
Frank's decision to not publicly endorse a candidate for the Manhattan District Attorney race earns the ire of Garrett, Henry, and especially Erin. Danny and Baez are called in to investigate a pool of blood in a hotel room, leading them to a well-known sleep doctor and author who is secretly seeing escorts outside of his marriage. The man's daughter is found to be responsible after it becomes known that his escort is her college friend. Elsewhere, Jamie is transferred to become the 29's intelligence officer, a job that forces him to keep secrets from other cops, including his own family and wife. This angers Eddie as she had requested to Captain McNichols that she and Jamie stay in the same house. Reluctant to accept the position, Jamie considers transferring to a precinct in close proximity to the 29 so that he can stay reasonably close to Eddie. With help from Anthony, Erin realizes her dad's non-endorsement allows her to offer constructive criticism of the NYPD during her campaign, something she needs to do to have any chance of winning.
| 257 | 3 | "Ghosted" | Jackeline Tejada | Teleplay by : Daniel Truly; Story by : Daniel Truly & Ashley Zazzarino | October 21, 2022 | 1302 | 5.91 |
Danny and Baez respond to a call that their psychic friend Maggie Gibson (Callie Thorne) has been stabbed. Given that the attack jeopardized her gift, Maggie is despondent that she cannot feel her late daughter's presence as a result and bonds with Baez while interacting with the latter's adopted daughter. Meanwhile, Jamie convinces Erin to let a suspect go in hopes of catching a bigger crook that lead him and Anthony on a goose chase in pursuit of a man running guns in the neighborhood. Also, Eddie and Badillo find Eddie's car vandalized; Badillo recognizes the perp as his ex-girlfriend whom he abruptly stopped seeing when she suggested they move in together. Frank grapples with how to honor Bill Connors, his predecessor as NYPD Commissioner who had recently passed. While Connors is praised by his widow and Gormley for being a stand-up cop, his history of taking bribes and siphoning money is brought to light.
| 258 | 4 | "Life During Wartime" | Doug Aarniokoski | Ian Biederman | October 28, 2022 | 1304 | 5.68 |
Danny and Baez investigate a series of violent robberies targeting luxury timepieces, going undercover as a couple to catch the crooks. DA Crawford personally asks Erin to investigate an accomplice of a convicted criminal; while Anthony is certain the accused is guilty, the evidence is circumstantial at best, making Erin reluctant to prosecute without further details. She comes to realize the man is actually innocent and that Crawford handed her the investigation with ulterior motives to jeopardize Erin's run for DA, despite Erin not publicly announcing her candidacy yet. The mayor intends to re-open an investigation into an officer who shot a teen. Although the evidence acquitted the officer beforehand, this brings back feelings of guilt over the incident. Jamie interviews a decorated officer to join his Field Intel team.
| 259 | 5 | "Homefront" | Alex Zakrzewski | Kevin Riley | November 4, 2022 | 1305 | 6.09 |
Frank and Garrett disagree about how to handle protesters who had harassed Henry over an old NYPD tactic. Meanwhile, Danny forms an unlikely partnership with an informant in order to prevent a murder. Also, Eddie clashes with McNichols after she defies her captain's direct order by interviewing someone close to a kidnapping victim. The detective working the case insists they follow a lead that ultimately brings them no closer to solving the case. To put away a major criminal, Erin strikes a deal with the man who previously assaulted Baker, leading to conflict between the two as well as Anthony. Baker and Anthony then collaborate to arrest the criminal without needing to free Baker's assailant.
| 260 | 6 | "On Dangerous Ground" | Ralph Hemecker | Jack Ciapciak | November 18, 2022 | 1306 | 5.82 |
After Danny and Baez are called to investigate a murder, Jamie brings the detectives a lead thanks to his new position. A young man named Elijah confesses to the act, saying it was part of a gang initiation; Jamie wishes to have him lead them to his boss, while Danny wants to close the case to get justice for the murder victim's husband, with whom he had empathized. Jamie goes over Danny's head to pursue the gang leader, leading to a Reagan vs. Reagan conflict that only strains further after the victim's husband goes after Elijah and is arrested as a result. Erin and Anthony work with Joe Hill when a case goes south due to the ADA being a no-show in court. They soon discover he was corrupt, having let the defendant slide several times, and the prosecutor later hangs himself. Joe's comments about the DA's office when this comes to light cause a rift between him and Erin. Also, Frank declines an invitation to speak at a policing forum at a college that had shunned him before, but later grows conflicted after learning Henry and Sid had both accepted an offer to attend in his place.
| 261 | 7 | "Heroes" | Doug Aarniokoski | Siobhan Byrne O'Connor | December 2, 2022 | 1307 | 5.62 |
Still at odds over their previous case together, Danny and Jamie begrudgingly join forces to arrest a robber after he assaults a couple. Admitting he felt like he failed his family when Joe Reagan was killed and that feeling resurfaced when Jamie was shot, Danny apologizes to Jamie for his behavior towards him. Anthony's daughter Sophia (Isabel Harper Leigh) is the sole witness to the murder of her ballet teacher; Anthony does not want her to testify out of fear for her safety, pitting him against Erin who sees no other way to lock up the criminal. Meanwhile, Frank and Garrett argue about how to punish an officer who, while off-duty, failed to act during a robbery despite carrying his weapon. While Garrett reminds Frank that the officer was not required to intervene while off-duty, Frank says the man did not act in the spirit of the NYPD badge and transfers the officer to Fleet Services. Elsewhere, Eddie and Badillo (Ian Quinlan) come to the aid of a young woman visiting the city for the first time only to get pushed into traffic by a violent thug. They bring the attacker to justice and personally give her a tour of the city, lifting her spirits.
| 262 | 8 | "Poetic Justice" | Jackeline Tejada | Teleplay by : Brian Burns; Story by : Brian Burns and Van B. Nguyen | December 9, 2022 | 1308 | 6.05 |
Danny crosses paths with Sonny Le (Alex Duong, see 12x07 "USA Today") a criminal from a previous case when his gang beats up a seemingly innocent man. They soon learn Sonny's crew played vigilante on the victim, who had preyed upon and violently attacked several Vietnamese women. Meanwhile, an off-duty cop incessantly films and questions Mayor Chase, much like how citizens harass cops, leading Frank and Mayor Chase to clash once again. Also, Anthony worries that Jack's renewed relationship with Erin may harm the latter's DA campaign due to some of his shadier clients. Learning the truth, Erin breaks up with Jack again. Elsewhere, Jamie's boss tasks him with investigating Badillo, whose phone records with a criminal may indicate him being a dirty cop. Jamie finds that the criminal is merely trying to frame Badillo due to Badillo arresting the man several times. As such, Jamie informs his boss that the officer is innocent, having never contacted the perp himself.
| 263 | 9 | "Nothing Sacred" | Bridget Moynahan | Daniel Truly | January 6, 2023 | 1309 | 6.10 |
Joe Hill is enraged when Joe Reagan's grave is knocked over, as is Frank, though he tries to talk his grandson out of investigating due to his emotions on the matter. This causes Joe to lash out at Frank, who goes to Paula for advice. Paula helps him realize that much of his grandson's anger is due to his grief over the father he loves but never got to know. They find it was the nephew of the cemetery groundskeeper who was angry over getting fired due to repeated tardiness. Frank has Joe meet him at the grave where the new headstone now reads "Beloved Son, Brother, and Father." Meanwhile, Henry's friend and neighbor Donna is scammed out of a large amount of money, so he brings it to Erin and Anthony's attention, working with the latter to bust the scammer. Also, Eddie and Badillo meet a young girl whose puppy was stolen. They inform Captain McNichols, who takes the case herself due to her guilt over yelling at her daughter whose dog went missing in a similar fashion. Though upset at first over her case getting yanked from her, Eddie understands McNichols' reasoning, and they arrest the dog thieves and free the animals. Elsewhere, Danny is met by the wife of his old friend and partner, who worries for her husband's well-being (as well as their marriage) while deep undercover.
| 264 | 10 | "Fake It 'Til You Make It" | Robert Harmon | Ian Biederman | January 13, 2023 | 1310 | 6.12 |
Jamie and his partner in intelligence infiltrate a high-tech car smuggling ring, where the young officer learns a lesson in self-confidence and utilizes it to ultimately save his sergeant's life. Meanwhile, Frank is agitated when the mayor begins a solo patrol program that causes more officer injuries on the job, and even more so when his chief of transit backs this new program. The mayor then backstabs the chief by pushing to have him fired once he learns the effect the program has on the officers. Also, Eddie and Badillo respond to a robbery call where an apparent officer subdued the criminal. Him not calling it in raises suspicion in Eddie's mind, so she informs Danny, and they work together to put a stop to this police impersonator. Elsewhere, Erin hires an image consultant to help with her D.A. campaign, though is uneasy about putting up a front; rather, she wishes to be elected based on her experience rather than her image.
| 265 | 11 | "Lost Ones" | Jackeline Tejada | Kevin Riley & Yasmine Cadet | January 20, 2023 | 1311 | 6.14 |
Danny and Baez investigate the death of a well-known chess player who was estranged from his son. The son's guilt over his refusal to read the letters his father wrote him lead him to investigate himself, but it is found out that the man committed suicide by overdosing on drugs. Meanwhile, Erin is asked by an influential pastor to look into his nephew's arrest in exchange for an endorsement, but Crawford takes the case file. Erin convinces her to work together on the case, only to discover that the pastor's own business dealings necessitate an investigation. Elsewhere, Gormley is asked by Danny to ask Frank to help get full medical benefits for a fellow 54th squad detective, Laura Acosta, who was critically injured on the job after taking Danny's shift shortly after Linda's passing. Danny claims the catalysts are his guilt over her circumstances as well as her helping him through tough times, though Frank can sense a spark between Danny and Laura. Danny admits at Sunday dinner that he has a dinner date with Laura later that evening. Also, Jamie attempts to help a recently released felon, whom he had arrested as a rookie cop, reintegrate back into society.
| 266 | 12 | "The Big Leagues" | Ralph Hemecker | Teleplay by : Brian Burns & Peter D'Antonio; Story by : Brian Burns & Peter D'Antonio & Kevin Wade | February 3, 2023 | 1312 | 6.19 |
Danny reunites with childhood friend and former criminal Mickey Patrick (Tom Cavanagh), who comes to him for help finding his missing fiancee. Danny investigates only to discover that the woman is not who Mickey thought she was. Meanwhile, Anthony surprises Erin with one last stakeout before her run for district attorney. Also, Jamie comes across a former officer caught stealing from construction sites where the foreman had left undocumented immigrants in a bind. The man goes to confront the foreman while on a wire, but Jamie's act of helping the former officer get away results in a three-day suspension. Elsewhere, a woman confesses to murdering her husband in front of Frank, but it was in self-defense and the man had chronically abused her. The captain and officers that had responded to her calls let him slide due to his working for them as an informant, but Frank terminates the three due to their inaction in helping the woman.
| 267 | 13 | "Past History" | Jackeline Tejada | Siobhan Byrne O'Connor | February 10, 2023 | 1313 | 6.25 |
Danny and Baez race against the clock to catch a serial killer targeting young women across the city. Dr. Walker, the psychiatrist that helps them with descriptions of the killer, turns out to be the culprit himself. Though he admits to killing two women, he hints that more bodies will drop. Meanwhile, Eddie and Badillo respond to a stabbing death where a young female office worker admits to killing her boss but pleads self-defense. Eddie asks Erin's ex-husband Jack to represent the woman, leading to tension with Erin. Also, Joe breaks FBI protocol while working on a joint task force; Frank temporarily transfers him, and that combined with lingering grief over never getting to know his father weighs heavily on Joe's mind. He and Frank find some peace by later watching old family movies of the elder Joe.
| 268 | 14 | "Collision Course" | Ralph Hemecker | Jack Ciapciak & Daniel Truly | March 3, 2023 | 1314 | 6.22 |
Eddie's former partner Rachel Witten (Lauren Patten), now a social worker, brings an accusation of excessive force against two officers who subdued a boy on the autism spectrum that she was working with. The officers turn out to be from Eddie's precinct and, despite her trying to remove herself from the situation, they accuse her of favoring Witten. Meanwhile, Danny and Baez's car is violently crashed into by Trina, a troubled foster child driving a stolen car that has a dead body in the trunk. After a while, Trina admits that she stole the car and knows who killed the victim but swears it wasn't her; she leads the detectives to the person responsible. Also, Erin meets with a campaign manager and asks Anthony to tag along for moral support; the manager requests Erin remove Anthony from her team presumably due to his NYPD history, but Anthony requests a transfer himself. It soon surfaces that Anthony had arrested the campaign manager years back for assaulting her boyfriend at the time; Erin convinces them to work together.
| 269 | 15 | "Close to Home" | Doug Aarniokoski | Ian Biederman & Yasmine Cadet | March 10, 2023 | 1315 | 5.74 |
Danny partners with Texas Ranger Waylon Gates (Lyle Lovett) again to deliver an infamous drug cartel boss to arraignment, but the criminal threatens to harm Jack and Nicky, leading Danny to ask Frank to assign protective custody to their out-of-town family members. Meanwhile, Erin takes on a highly contentious sexual assault case involving a well-known basketball star whose agent is revealed to be complicit in covering up the assaults. Also, Eddie partners with Cora Felton, the officer that Eddie once reported due to hiding her pregnancy, when a mother accuses Eddie of lying when she promised to find her son's killer. Jamie and his boss present a plan to Frank for Jamie to go undercover to bust a child trafficking ring, but Frank plans to have the Vice team capture the ringleader due to their more extensive experience with the case (despite their mission taking a long time). Jamie sees it as Frank being too protective, leading to a disagreement between father and son.
| 270 | 16 | "The Naked Truth" | Donald Thorin Jr. | Nicole Abraham & Daniel Truly | March 31, 2023 | 1316 | 5.33 |
An old friend of Eddie's named Tracey (Alyssa Umphress) invites her and Jamie to dinner at her restaurant where two employees get into a violent fight. Jamie's boss has him investigate whether the business is being used as a drug front; although Tracey is cleared of wrongdoing, they succeed in taking down some drugrunners. Meanwhile, the sister of the ADA that Erin dismissed due to corruption (see 13x06 "On Dangerous Ground") and later killed himself sues Erin, claiming she caused his suicide. She works with Anthony and her ex-husband Jack to prove she did not cause it. Also, Frank weighs whether he should fire a hero officer when he learns she has an online profile featuring naked photos of herself. Danny and Baez respond to a beating that hospitalizes a man and they struggle with bias when they are faced with various descriptions of the same suspect by several witnesses. However, when the victim wakes up he informs the detectives that the perp was white.
| 271 | 17 | "Smoke & Mirrors" | Jackeline Tejada | Kevin Riley & Van B. Nguyen | April 7, 2023 | 1317 | 6.21 |
At a retirement party with an open bar for a longtime NYPD member, Gormley and Baker get into an argument with a sergeant who had bumped into Gormley, spilling drinks. When the sergeant attempts to sucker punch Gormley, Baker lays him out, leading to a complaint and a departmental investigation. Though he declares he will stay out of the matter (causing a rift between him and his Dream Team), Frank persuades the sergeant not to press charges due to his drunken behavior at the party, thereby clearing Baker's name. Meanwhile, Jamie and Danny team up to investigate a series of carjackings involving Buggs, one of Danny's confidential informants, but the working relationship between Danny and Buggs is strained when his brother Marcus (who has been perpetrating the carjackings) is murdered by Reggie, his partner in the criminal enterprise. Also, a reporter asks Crawford (Roslyn Ruff) about reports of her husband’s infidelity during a press conference; Erin tries to help by investigating the source, only for Crawford to snap at her, asking her to stay out of her personal life. Eddie and Badillo encounter a woman who says she is being stalked by a man she recently met on a dating app, with little evidence to back her up. Based on Badillo’s intuition about the situation, Eddie discovers evidence that proves her partner was right.
| 272 | 18 | "Family Matters" | Ralph Hemecker | Jack Ciapciak & Peter D'Antonio | April 21, 2023 | 1318 | 5.99 |
Danny and Baez investigate a case of grand larceny tied to feuding crime families when the gifts are stolen during a mob wedding. Meanwhile, Frank clashes with Mayor Chase when an influx of immigrants arrive in the city and Chase refuses to sign off on funds for additional police support despite strongarming Frank into employing more of his cops for Chase's cause. Erin questions whether her district attorney campaign is compromising her day job after she fails to get a rapist convicted. She decides to work with Jack to get justice, even if it hinders her campaign for District Attorney. Also, Eddie enlists Jamie's help to bust a drug dealer responsible for fentanyl overdoses in order to comfort a grieving grandfather (Larry Manetti) who happens to be retired from the force.
| 273 | 19 | "Fire Drill" | Donald Thorin Jr. | Ian Biederman | May 5, 2023 | 1319 | 5.61 |
At an anti-cop protest, a woman shoves Eddie twice and is arrested but fakes serious injury despite Eddie barely using force. She asks Frank to put her on modified assignment to show that Frank doesn't play favoritism, despite all parties agreeing that the arrest was by the book. Still unsatisfied, the protester files a civil suit, forcing Frank to distance himself from the CCRB investigation. However, Henry obtains evidence that proves the protester has no case by photographing her taking off her neck brace, leading to the charges being dropped. Meanwhile, Jamie partners with the FDNY to find the arsonist responsible for a massive fire at an NYPD evidence storage facility. The massive loss of evidence leaves Erin & Anthony scrambling to bring criminals to justice and Danny & Baez back to square one trying to convict the drug lord they previously arrested (see 13x15 "Close to Home"). Anthony also asks Erin to allow him to personally investigate the murder of his old friend in an armed robbery.
| 274 | 20 | "Irish Exits" | Ralph Hemecker | Kevin Riley | May 12, 2023 | 1320 | 5.46 |
Frank worries about his longtime friend Lenny Ross (Treat Williams) when he suspects the former officer is hiding his true reason for returning to the city. He eventually discovers Lenny has a terminal illness. Meanwhile, Danny and Baez investigate when Baez and her daughter are targeted by a criminal Baez once put away. Baez nearly goes vigilante on the perp, but Danny successfully talks her down. Also, Eddie gives her partner Badillo relationship advice when his ex-girlfriend is physically attacked. Anthony is sucked into the inner workings of an underground crime ring when his chaotic cousin Joey begs him for a favor.
| 275 | 21 | "Forgive Us Our Trespasses" | Alex Zakrzewski | Siobhan Byrne O'Connor & Kevin Wade | May 19, 2023 | 1321 | 5.78 |
Danny is reunited with his old partner Jackie Curatola (Jennifer Esposito), now a Chief of Police with Suffolk County, when they and Baez suspect a copycat killer of emulating previous murders (see 13x13 "Past History"). However, Dr. Walker is revealed to be back killing women under an alternate persona known as Jeremy. He attacks Jackie at her home, but though she fights him off, he escapes before Danny and Baez can apprehend him. Meanwhile, Frank learns of a plan by Mayor Chase (Dylan Walsh) to put homeless people in handcuffs in order to get them into shelters. They go back and forth over the plan, culminating in Chase blackmailing Frank after his detail is confronted by a homeless man. Archbishop Kearns scolds Chase before convincing the two to find common ground. Also, Jamie apprehends Tyler Green, a man who had committed criminal assault but was cut a deal by the DA's office, when he reverts to his old ways. He and Eddie work together with Erin to bring the man to justice once and for all, and after the case is closed, Erin announces to the press that she has decided not to run for District Attorney after all.

== Ratings ==
Viewership and ratings per episode of Blue Bloods season 13
| No. | Title | Air date | Rating (18–49) | Viewers (millions) | DVR (18–49) | DVR viewers (millions) | Total (18–49) | Total viewers (millions) |
|---|---|---|---|---|---|---|---|---|
| 1 | "Keeping the Faith" | October 7, 2022 | 0.4 | 6.40 | 0.3 | 3.43 | 0.7 | 9.83 |
| 2 | "First Blush" | October 14, 2022 | 0.4 | 6.06 | 0.3 | 3.46 | 0.7 | 9.52 |
| 3 | "Ghosted" | October 21, 2022 | 0.5 | 5.91 | 0.3 | 3.45 | 0.7 | 9.36 |
| 4 | "Life During Wartime" | October 28, 2022 | 0.4 | 5.68 | 0.3 | 3.67 | 0.7 | 9.35 |
| 5 | "Homefront" | November 4, 2022 | 0.4 | 6.09 | 0.3 | 3.62 | 0.7 | 9.71 |
| 6 | "On Dangerous Ground" | November 18, 2022 | 0.4 | 5.82 | —N/a | —N/a | —N/a | —N/a |
| 7 | "Heroes" | December 2, 2022 | 0.3 | 5.62 | —N/a | —N/a | —N/a | —N/a |
| 8 | "Poetic Justice" | December 9, 2022 | 0.4 | 6.05 | —N/a | —N/a | —N/a | —N/a |
| 9 | "Nothing Sacred" | January 6, 2023 | 0.4 | 6.10 | 0.3 | 3.53 | 0.7 | 9.63 |
| 10 | "Fake It 'Til You Make It" | January 13, 2023 | 0.4 | 6.12 | 0.3 | 3.44 | 0.7 | 9.56 |
| 11 | "Lost Ones" | January 20, 2023 | 0.4 | 6.14 | 0.3 | 3.56 | 0.7 | 9.70 |
| 12 | "The Big Leagues" | February 3, 2023 | 0.4 | 6.19 | —N/a | —N/a | —N/a | —N/a |
| 13 | "Past History" | February 10, 2023 | 0.4 | 6.25 | —N/a | —N/a | —N/a | —N/a |
| 14 | "Collision Course" | March 3, 2023 | 0.4 | 6.22 | —N/a | —N/a | —N/a | —N/a |
| 15 | "Close to Home" | March 10, 2023 | 0.3 | 5.74 | —N/a | —N/a | —N/a | —N/a |
| 16 | "The Naked Truth" | March 31, 2023 | 0.3 | 5.33 | —N/a | —N/a | —N/a | —N/a |
| 17 | "Smoke & Mirrors" | April 7, 2023 | 0.4 | 6.21 | —N/a | —N/a | —N/a | —N/a |
| 18 | "Family Matters" | April 21, 2023 | 0.3 | 5.99 | —N/a | —N/a | —N/a | —N/a |
| 19 | "Fire Drill" | May 5, 2023 | 0.3 | 5.61 | —N/a | —N/a | —N/a | —N/a |
| 20 | "Irish Exits" | May 12, 2023 | 0.3 | 5.46 | —N/a | —N/a | —N/a | —N/a |
| 21 | "Forgive Us Our Trespasses" | May 19, 2023 | 0.3 | 5.78 | —N/a | —N/a | —N/a | —N/a |
