= Blue Bloods season 2 =

Season of American television series Blue Bloods

Blue Bloods
- Season 2
- Region 1 DVD cover art
- No. of episodes: 22

Release
- Original network: CBS
- Original release: September 23, 2011 – May 11, 2012

Season chronology
- ← Previous; Season 1 Next → Season 3

The second season of Blue Bloods, a police procedural drama series created by Robin Green and Mitchell Burgess, premiered on CBS September 23, 2011 and ended May 11, 2012. Ed Zuckerman served as executive producer and showrunner for the season after Green and Burgess departed the show at the end of the first season.

== Cast ==
Donnie Wahlberg, Bridget Moynahan, Will Estes, Len Cariou are first credited, with Tom Selleck receiving an "and" billing at the close of the main title sequence. Jennifer Esposito retains her "also starring" credit from the first season, whilst Amy Carlson and Sami Gayle are also credited as "also starring" during the episodes that they appear.

The cast for season 2 includes:

=== Main ===
- Tom Selleck as New York City Police Commissioner Francis "Frank" Reagan
- Donnie Wahlberg as Detective 1st Grade Daniel "Danny" Reagan
- Bridget Moynahan as ADA Erin Reagan
- Will Estes as Officer Jamison "Jamie" Reagan
- Len Cariou as New York City Police Commissioner Henry Reagan (Retired)
- Amy Carlson as Linda Reagan
- Sami Gayle as Nicole "Nicky" Reagan-Boyle

=== Recurring ===
- Jennifer Esposito as Detective 1st Grade Jackie Curatola
- Abigail Hawk as Detective 1st Grade Abigail Baker
- Gregory Jbara as Deputy Commissioner of Public Information Garrett Moore
- Robert Clohessy as Sergeant Sidney "Sid" Gormley
- Nicholas Turturro as Sergeant Anthony Renzulli
- Ato Essandoh as Reverend Darnell Potter
- Tony Terraciano as Jack Reagan
- Andrew Terraciano as Sean Reagan

== Episodes ==
No. overall	No. in season	Title	Directed by	Written by	Original release date	Prod. code	U.S. viewers (millions)
23	1	"Mercy"	Michael Pressman	Kevin Wade	September 23, 2011	201	12.06
When a supporter for Mayor-elect Poole is found dead in his car, Frank is ordered to position the killing as a random act of violence. Meanwhile, while on his first undercover assignment Jamie bonds with a suspicious patron who turns out to have a connection with the Cavazerre crime family. Tony Bennett and Carrie Underwood perform a duet of "It Had To Be You" at Mayor-elect Poole’s party.
24	2	"Friendly Fire"	John Polson	Brian Burns	September 30, 2011	203	11.30
After having a very rough day, with various blow ups, Danny faces an Internal Affairs investigation due to his shooting of an undercover cop who failed to identify himself.
25	3	"Critical Condition"	Ralph Hemecker	Thomas Kelly	October 7, 2011	202	11.29
When an attempted bank robbery goes wrong and turns into a wounded hostage situation, Danny discovers one of the armed robbers is Billy Flood, a former cop who was a member of Frank’s secret enforcement unit. Meanwhile Jamie is temporarily assigned a new partner, Luisa Sosa (Monica Raymund), for a plain clothes “Bingo Bag” assignment.
26	4	"Innocence"	Alex Zakrzewski	Siobhan Byrne-O'Connor	October 14, 2011	204	11.19
DA Rosselini assigns Erin to reopen an 18-year-old rape case, based on new DNA evidence that exonerates Miles Thomas of the crime. Frank who was the arresting officer in the case, assigns Baker to find the actual rapist. Meanwhile, Danny and Jackie investigate the shooting of three teenagers in a park, who appear to have been shot for no apparent reason. Jamie and Renzulli deal with a laptop theft. Nicky gets permission to go into the city at night unchaperoned. Note: Nominated for an Edgar Award.
27	5	"A Night on the Town"	Ralph Hemecker	Kevin Wade	October 21, 2011	205	10.90
Danny and Linda embark on a romantic getaway weekend, but he fails in his attempt to juggle it with his investigation of a suspicious fatal car accident and medicaid fraud case. Jamie resumes his undercover assignment as "Jimmy Riordan", renewing his acquaintance with Noble Sanfino, the mercurial nephew of a high-profile Cavazerre mob boss. Henry looks for misplaced musical tickets.
28	6	"Black and Blue"	Alex Chapple	Brian Burns	November 4, 2011	206	12.73
Frank deals with a looming political crisis after Jamie and Renzulli are injured at a black religious center, after responding to a robbery call (male with a gun), by security members who physically prevented them from climbing the stairs. Frank must diffuse a tense situation, incited by a rabble-rousing community leader, Reverend Darnell Potter (Ato Essandoh).
29	7	"Lonely Hearts Club"	Félix Alcalá	Vanessa Rojas	November 11, 2011	207	11.30
Jackie goes undercover as an escort to try and track down a serial killer who is murdering prostitutes in hotel rooms. Meanwhile, Erin meets Jacob Krystal, a potential suitor with whom she shares common interests at an art gallery. Henry is wooed by Ajax, a private security corporation hoping to capitalize on the connections he made during his forty years in law enforcement. Frank deals with the patrolman’s union contractual demands as he deals with budget cuts.
30	8	"Thanksgiving"	Steve Gomer	Shaun Cassidy	November 18, 2011	209	12.41
On Thanksgiving eve, Henry suffers a heart attack as he and Linda make dinner preparations, which leaves him hospitalized and the family worrying about him. While Jamie and Renzulli are on foot patrol, they witness a woman’s death from a fall from a 17-story high-rise residential unit. When Danny and Jackie look into the apparent suicide, they discover it may not be what it seems. Frank and Mayor Poole disagree about a terrorist threat to the Lincoln Tunnel. When Jacob runs into Erin and Nicky on the streets of the city, Erin notices undercover police surveillance of them. Meanwhile, Renzulli deals with phone calls concerning his $3,000 gambling debt.
31	9	"Moonlighting"	Robert Harmon	Kevin Wade	December 2, 2011	210	11.05
Danny and Sam Croft spend the day locating the bodies of a number of cold case victims through the assistance of Tommy Marone, a dangerous ex-mobster, who is helping the authorities in exchange for leniency for his son’s grand theft auto charges. Meanwhile, Jamie (as Jimmy Riordan) begins work in a boiler room operation in order to uncover secrets about the Cavazerre crime family. But he has a rough go with his new boss, Johnny Tesla, a made man. Jacob Krystal returns and makes contact with Erin.
32	10	"Whistle Blower"	Robert Harmon	Thomas Kelly	January 6, 2012	208	11.34
When Erin's confidential informant Ray Milo is murdered while leaving a restaurant with his wife, Erin blames herself and works to help Danny and Jackie discover who killed him. Frank deals with the ramifications of a potential case of police brutality caught on video.
33	11	"The Uniform"	Alex Zakrzewski	John Moskowitz	January 13, 2012	211	12.08
Danny and Jackie investigate a murder scene at a diner, where a witness claims a uniformed officer fled the scene after shots were fired. Jamie takes a second job to help pay off his Harvard Law School loans.
34	12	"The Job"	Nick Gomez	Brian Burns	February 3, 2012	212	11.44
While driving home from a football watching party with Linda and his sons, Danny strikes a man who had run into the road ahead of the car. As Danny attends to the wounded person (who turns out to be a convicted child molester), another man who was chasing the man shoots at Danny. The bullet just misses the boys in the SUV. As Danny and Jackie try to locate the shooter, a shaken Linda proclaims she is tired of being "second fiddle" to the NYPD. Meanwhile, Frank deals with survivor's guilt when he learns that his old partner and friend John McKenna is dying from a 9/11-related disease. In secret, Frank visits a psychiatrist (guest starring Academy Award winner F. Murray Abraham). Note: Writer Brian Burns was a finalist for the Humanitas Prize for this episode.
35	13	"Leap of Faith"	David M. Barrett	David Black	February 10, 2012	213	11.82
When a wealthy woman dies of a heart attack, her eccentric daughter claims that she received a message from God, who told her that her stepfather (guest star Timothy Busfield) is the murderer of the woman. Skeptical at first, Danny and Jackie still investigate the daughter’s claims. Also, Frank investigates a rumor about Father William Campion (who is up for canonization) that he went too far when protesting the Vietnam War.
36	14	"Parenthood"	John Polson	Siobhan Byrne-O'Connor	February 17, 2012	214	10.81
When a man's family is robbed and beaten in front of him, and the assailant is shot and killed, the Reagans debate about how far they would go to protect their family. Meanwhile, when Mayor Poole's illegitimate daughter is arrested at a college protest, Frank struggles with the charges brought against her.
37	15	"The Life We Chose"	Félix Alcalá	Thomas Kelly	February 24, 2012	215	11.35
When a close friend to the Reagan family, an undercover detective, is murdered in the line of duty, Linda and the boys begin to worry about Danny, as his relentless search for the suspected killer (nicknamed Phantom) starts to take a toll on his emotional state of mind. Henry and Nicky prepare for a duet performance in the upcoming parish talent show.
38	16	"Women with Guns"	Martha Mitchell	Kevin Wade	March 2, 2012	216	11.47
Melanie Maines (Margaret Colin), a high-profile reporter and close friend of Frank, is nearly assaulted while she is out with him, when a masked stranger (guest star Tom Wopat) throws acid at her. Danny and Jackie search for the would-be attacker. Meanwhile, Jamie's undercover case investigating the Cavazerre crime family comes to a critical stage, when he learns from Bianca Sanfino (Mara Davi) that Johnny Tesla has been whacked.
39	17	"Reagan vs. Reagan"	Jim McKay	Ed Zuckerman	March 9, 2012	217	11.27
As Erin begins a trial prosecuting a young woman accused of killing her rich and older husband, one of the defendant's attorneys is mysteriously murdered, and Danny is assigned to that investigation. Later, when Danny is put on the stand by the defense, matters get heated between the siblings as they face off in court (which later spills over into the family dinner). Meanwhile, Frank deals with large fraudulent charges made on an institutional credit card that may point back to Jimmy’s, a restaurant that he often frequents.
40	18	"No Questions Asked"	Christine Moore	Vanessa Rojas & Brian Burns	March 30, 2012	218	10.72
Danny is put in a difficult position when he receives information about a robbery shooting through the NYPD's “no questions asked” gun buyback program arranged by Reverend Potter. He must choose to either arrest the suspect or follow the "no questions asked" rule. Jamie helps Nicky deal with her friend Diane’s social media problem caused by a risqué photo.
41	19	"Some Kind of Hero"	Alex Zakrzewski	Siobhan Byrne-O'Connor	April 6, 2012	219	10.92
Danny causes waves in the department when he investigates a closed case, the suicide of a firefighter, at the insistence of the man's 11-year-old son. Meanwhile, Jamie saves a baby from a burning building, which will jeopardize his undercover work if he is identified as a hero in the press.
42	20	"Working Girls"	James Whitmore Jr.	Ian Biederman	April 27, 2012	220	10.47
Danny and Jackie are assigned to protect a key witness in a Russian mob trial, but when an attempt is made on her life, they realize there is a leak on the task force. Meanwhile, Erin is offered a job as deputy mayor, which would have her working directly with her father.
43	21	"Collateral Damage"	Ralph Hemecker	Kevin Wade & Thomas Kelly	May 4, 2012	221	10.36
Danny and Jackie investigate the suspicious death of a high-rolling investor, who had injuries from a fight, but no marks on his hands. Meanwhile, Frank puts Jamie under house arrest, after hearing the Sanfino family has put out a hit on "Jimmy Riordan."
44	22	"Mother's Day"	Michael Pressman	Brian Burns	May 11, 2012	222	10.73
Frank must race to prevent a biological weapon attack on New York City, while keeping it a secret from his family during their most sentimental holiday, Mother's Day. Meanwhile, a long-standing conflict between Danny and Jamie comes to a head.

== Ratings ==
№	Episode	Air date	18-49 rating	Viewers (million)	Weekly rank	Live+7 18-49	Live+7 viewers (million)
1	"Mercy"	September 23, 2011	2.0	12.06	#25	2.7	14.91
2	"Friendly Fire"	September 30, 2011	1.8	11.30	#21	2.6	14.21
3	"Critical Condition"	October 7, 2011	1.9	11.29	#21	N/A	14.19
4	"Innocence"	October 14, 2011	1.8	11.19	#19	N/A	13.92
5	"A Night on the Town"	October 21, 2011	1.7	10.90	N/A	2.4	13.59
6	"Black and Blue"	November 4, 2011	2.1	12.73	#16	N/A	N/A
7	"Lonely Hearts Club"	November 11, 2011	1.7	11.30	#19	2.5	14.17
8	"Thanksgiving"	November 18, 2011	2.0	12.41	#12	2.8	15.33
9	"Moonlighting"	December 2, 2011	1.6	11.05	#8	2.2	13.57
10	"Whistle Blower"	January 6, 2012	1.8	11.34	#15	2.6	14.17
11	"The Uniform"	January 13, 2012	1.8	12.08	#11	2.5	14.70
12	"The Job"	February 3, 2012	1.7	11.44	#10	2.4	14.13
13	"Leap of Faith"	February 10, 2012	1.8	11.82	#15	N/A	14.34
14	"Parenthood"	February 17, 2012	1.6	10.81	#16	N/A	13.45
15	"The Life We Chose"	February 24, 2012	1.7	11.35	#18	N/A	13.90
16	"Women with Guns"	March 2, 2012	1.7	11.47	#13	N/A	13.81
17	"Reagan V. Reagan"	March 9, 2012	1.6	11.27	#11	2.3	13.93
18	"No Questions Asked"	March 30, 2012	1.6	10.72	#15	2.2	13.30
19	"Some Kind of Hero"	April 6, 2012	1.7	10.92	#15	2.3	13.53
20	"Working Girls"	April 27, 2012	1.5	10.47	#10	2.2	13.19
21	"Collateral Damage"	May 4, 2012	1.4	10.36	#16	2.1	13.39
22	"Mother's Day"	May 11, 2012	1.3	10.73	#17	2.0	13.77
