= Erin Reagan =

- Blue Bloods character
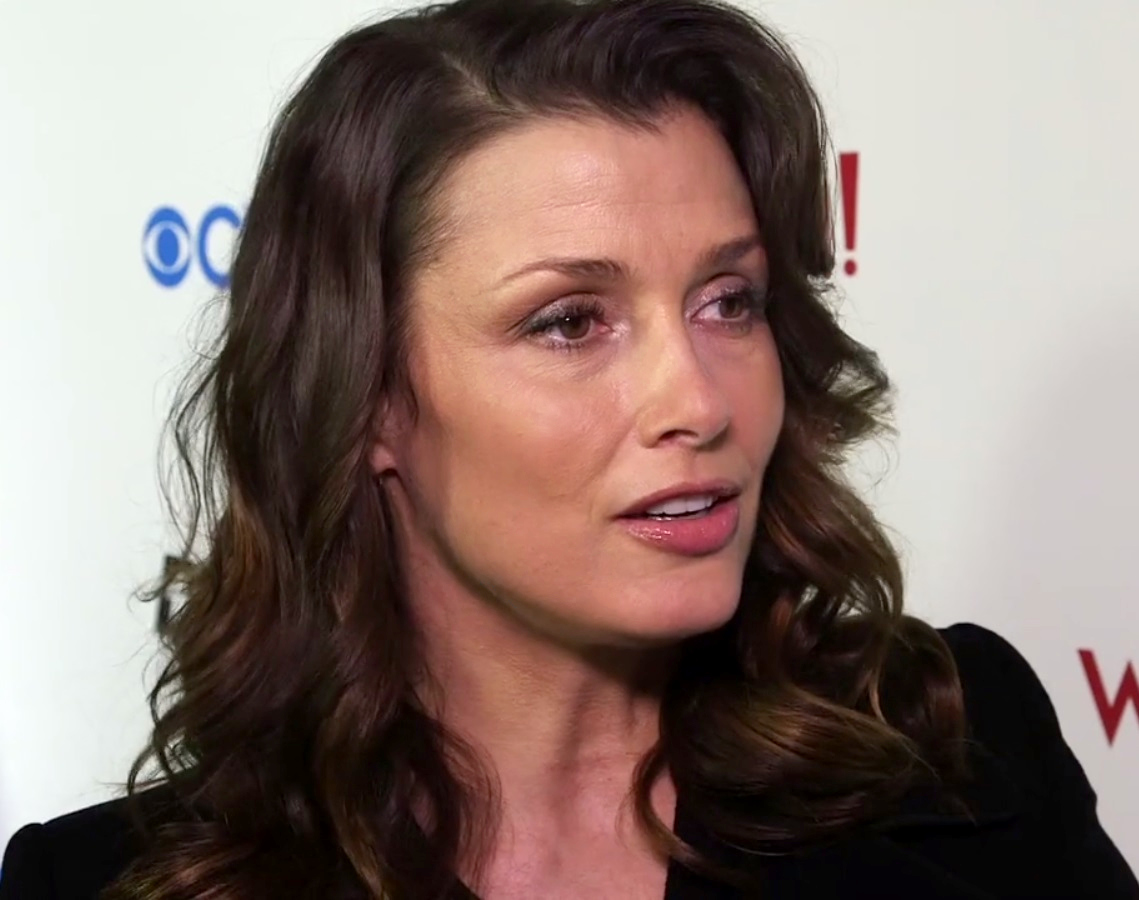
- Actor, Bridget Moynahan, in 2016.
- First appearance: "Pilot"; September 24, 2010
- Created by: Robin Green; Mitchell Burgess
- Portrayed by: Bridget Moynahan

In-universe information
- Full name: Erin Reagan
- Alias: Erin Reagan-Boyle (formerly)
- Gender: Female
- Occupation: Prosecutor
- Family: Francis Xavier "Frank" Reagan (father); Mary Margaret Reagan (mother)† Daniel Fitzgerald "Danny" Reagan (older brother); Joseph Conor "Joe" Reagan (younger brother)† Jameson "Jamie" Reagan (younger brother)
- Spouse: Jack Boyle (ex-husband)
- Significant others: Charles Rosselini (romantic interest); Jacob Krystal (romantic interest); Jack Boyle (fling); Robert McCoy (ex-boyfriend)
- Children: Nicky Reagan-Boyle
- Relatives: Henry Reagan (grandfather); Betty Reagan (grandmother)† Peter Christopher Reagan (uncle)† Charles Reagan (great-grandfather)† Linda Reagan (sister-in-law)† Eddie Janko (sister-in-law); Jack Reagan (nephew); Sean Reagan (nephew); Joe Hill (nephew); Joseph Francis Reagan (nephew)
- Religion: Catholic
- Nationality: Irish-American

DA career
- Department: Manhattan District Attorney's Office
- Years of service: 2000s – Present
- Rank: Bureau Chief

Erin Reagan is a fictional New York County Assistant District Attorney, and one of the main characters in the television series, Blue Bloods, being the only daughter of Frank Reagan. She is portrayed by Bridget Moynahan.

Co-star Donnie Wahlberg had encouraged Moynahan to take the role after working with her on a 2008 TV pilot called Bunker Hill.

Erin has been described as "brilliant but also incredibly strong", and as "the 'tough but feminine' Bureau Chief in the Manhattan District Attorney's Office who is the most small-l liberal of her family, but even she has no issue with police brutality if it gets the job done".

In July 2025, it was announced that the character would appear in the first episode of the spinoff series Boston Blue.

== Biography ==
A New York County Assistant District Attorney and single mother, Erin is the second child and only daughter of the current New York City Police Commissioner Frank Reagan and his wife Mary. She grew up in Bay Ridge, Brooklyn, with three brothers, Danny, Joe, and Jamie. It is implied throughout the series that she had something of a wild streak growing up (unlike her daughter).

It is mentioned in season 5 that she graduated top of her class from Columbia University. She later went on to attend Fordham University School of Law. Erin is also the only one of her siblings not to follow their father and grandfather into becoming a police officer. In season 6, Erin celebrated her 40th birthday.

At the start of the series, Erin is divorced from John "Jack" Boyle (Peter Hermann), a criminal defense attorney, whom she met when they were 19, and a single mother to their daughter, Nicky Reagan-Boyle. Erin is almost raped and killed by a criminal she had formerly prosecuted in the season 1 episode "Re-Do", though Frank saves her life by shooting her attacker dead. In "Old Wounds", she finally changes her name from Erin Reagan-Boyle back to Erin Reagan. Since her divorce, Erin has had a few romantic interests. She and her boss, District Attorney Charles Rosselini (Bobby Cannavale), flirted with each other and even shared a kiss after a date, but nothing ever came of it mainly due to Erin's reluctance with the idea of dating her boss. In 2011, she met Jacob Krystal (Fred Weller) at an art gallery; she later learned that he was an art thief who returned once-stolen works to their rightful owners, and he left town.

In the 2013 episode, "To Protect and Serve", Erin and her ex-husband Jack are taken hostage at the courthouse, and Erin is shot in the arm. She is saved by Danny after he says a coded message, "Please, don't hurt my family," after which she dropped to the ground, and Danny shot her assailant. It is revealed that their father taught them this when they were young, as a plan in case one of them was ever held at gunpoint. After the courtroom hostage situation, she began dating Jack again, but broke up with him when she realized Jack only wanted to date and that he didn't want a serious commitment. In 2014, Erin met Robert McCoy, a defense attorney, on a speed-date, and the two became romantically involved until he was appointed interim District Attorney, at which point she said she can't sleep with her boss. In later seasons, she was sporadically involved with Jack yet again.

In "Working Girls", Erin is offered the position of Deputy Mayor of Operations by Mayor Poole, but she turns him down. In "Ends and Means", Erin is promoted from Senior Counsel to Deputy Bureau Chief of the Trial Bureau. In the season four finale, she filed a complaint against her boss, Bureau Chief Amanda Harris, upon learning she had abused her power. In season six, Erin was considered for a judgeship. Erin is on the short list to become District Attorney in the season 11 episode "In the Name of the Father", after her boss, DA Samar Chatwell, is arrested on corruption charges. While Erin is on the short list to be named Acting DA by the governor, the governor ultimately chooses the then-Acting DA for Fulton County, Georgia (Atlanta) for the job. Throughout season 12, Erin contemplated running for Manhattan District Attorney, resolving to do so in the final episode of the season. Throughout season 13, Erin makes plans for her campaign, and has both positive and negative interactions with the current DA, who she is preparing to run against. She also continues to rekindle her relationship with Jack before putting it on hold to avoid political fallout from some of Jack's criminally connected clientele. In the season finale, however, Erin realizes that being DA would take her away from the important work she does as a prosecutor, and announces to the press that she will not be running in this election. At the end of season 14, she and Jack secretly remarry.

Like the rest of her family, Erin is licensed to carry a firearm. Her weapon of choice is the Glock 19 in 9×19mm and, according to Frank, she's a better shot than Danny and Jamie. In season 8, it was revealed Erin wanted to join the police force like her family, and wanted to take the exam, but it wasn't for her and she instead chose law and became a prosecutor.
