= Alex Duong =

American comedian and television actor (1984–2026)

- Duong in 2020
- Born: Alexander Duong; March 20, 1984; Dallas, Texas, U.S.
- Died: March 28, 2026 (aged 42); Santa Monica, California, U.S.
- Occupations: Comedian; television actor
- Years active: 2000s–2024
- Spouse: Christina Duong (m. 2018)
- Children: 1

Alexander Duong (March 20, 1984 – March 28, 2026) was an American comedian and television actor. He was best known for playing the recurring role of criminal and gang leader Sonny Le in the American police procedural television series Blue Bloods.

== Life and career ==
Duong was born in Dallas, Texas, the son of Vietnamese parents. He attended and graduated from North Dallas High School. He began his career as a stand-up comedian in the early 2000s. He first worked as a doorman at The Comedy Store, and performed at The Laugh Factory. He then began his screen career in 2006, appearing in the UPN semi-autobiographical sitcom television series Everybody Hates Chris.

In 2014, Duong starred as Genghis Khan in the YouTube comedy television series The Cost of Living. He guest-starred in television programs including The Young and the Restless, 90210, Mad TV, Death Valley, and Dexter, and played the recurring role of criminal and gang leader Sonny Le in the CBS police procedural television series Blue Bloods. In 2018, he was featured in the third season of the Comedy Central roast comedy competition television series Jeff Ross Presents Roast Battle, battling comedian Robin Tran.

Duong retired from acting in 2024, last appearing in his first and only film Sideways for Attention.

== Personal life and death ==
In 2018, Duong married Christina, a dental hygienist. They had a daughter in 2021. Their marriage lasted until Duong's death in 2026.

In 2025, Duong was diagnosed with alveolar rhabdomyosarcoma. He died of septic shock at the Saint John's Health Center in Santa Monica, California, on March 28, 2026, at the age of 42.
