= Jamie Reagan =

Fictional NYPD Officer

- Blue Bloods character
- First appearance: "Pilot"; September 24, 2010
- Last appearance: "End of Tour"; December 13, 2024
- Created by: Robin Green; Mitchell Burgess
- Portrayed by: Will Estes

In-universe information
- Full name: Jameson Reagan
- Gender: Male
- Title: Lieutenant
- Occupation: Police Officer
- Family: Francis Xavier "Frank" Reagan (father); Mary Margaret Reagan (mother)† Daniel Fitzgerald "Danny" Reagan (older brother); Erin Reagan (older sister); Joseph Conor "Joe" Reagan (older brother)†
- Spouse: Edit Marie "Eddie" Janko-Reagan
- Significant other: Sydney Davenport (ex-fiancée)
- Children: Joseph Francis Reagan (son with Eddie)
- Relatives: Joe Hill (nephew); Nicole Boyle (niece); Sean Reagan (nephew); Jack Reagan (nephew)

Police career
- Department: New York City Police Department
- Years of service: 2010 – Present
- Rank: Lieutenant

Jameson "Jamie" Reagan is a fictional NYPD Lieutenant, and one of the main characters in the television series, Blue Bloods and appears as a guest character in its spinoff series Boston Blue. He is the youngest son of Frank Reagan. He is portrayed by Will Estes.

== Biography ==
First introduced as a young police officer and recent Harvard Law School graduate, Jamie is the youngest child of the current New York City Police Commissioner Frank Reagan and his wife Mary. Jamie grew up in Bay Ridge, Brooklyn with two older brothers, Danny and Joe, and an older sister, Erin. His shield number as a Patrol Officer was 60528, and as a Sergeant is 71181.

He was stationed at the 12th Precinct, and is partnered with Sgt. Anthony Renzulli (his training officer) in seasons one and two, Officer Vinny Cruz in season three, and Officer Eddie Janko since season four. Upon Jamie’s promotion to Sergeant, he is transferred to the 29th Precinct.

Despite graduating from Harvard Law School, Jamie turns to police work following the death on the job of his brother Joe. During his first year on the job, Jamie was the one who continued Joe's investigation into the Blue Templar, a group of dirty and corrupt cops found to be responsible for Joe's death. In season two, he takes advantage of a chance opportunity to go undercover in the Sanfino crime family. In "Front Page News", Jamie gets into his first officer involved shooting in what he learns is a suicide by cop; the shooting leaves him with brief post-shooting trauma (more so since Bryant's death was found to be a suicide by cop), but between his family and the NYPD psychologist (Annabella Sciorra), he quickly recovers. In season four, he begins to express concerns because both his father and brother had made detective by that point in their careers, while he is still a patrol officer. In season six, Jamie is studying for and is considering taking the Sergeant's exam; however, he ultimately decides against taking it. In season seven, Frank gets wind from the ranks that he may be the only thing holding Jamie back from becoming a detective. When pressed, Jamie informs his father that he's happy where he is in his career and doesn't necessarily want another assignment. In that same episode, it is mentioned that Jamie is the only NYPD employee with a Harvard Law degree that walks a beat.

While attending Harvard, Jamie met and became involved with Sydney Davenport and the two even got engaged. However, Sydney broke up with him a few months after he became a police officer when realizing the true danger of his career.

Beginning in 2013, there was significant romantic tension between Jamie and his patrol partner, Eddie Janko, with the two even sharing a kiss. Jamie chose not to act on his feelings after learning that Sergeant Renzulli would reassign them to new road partners if they did. Despite agreeing to keep things professional, there remained lingering romantic tension between the two. In 2018, Jamie and Eddie get engaged along with choosing to remain as partners on the job after discovering there is no official rule against it. In Season 9 Episode 1 "Playing With Fire", however, after Frank contemplates issuing such a specific written rule because of his concerns, Eddie tells Jamie that all she wanted was for them to be a couple. Jamie then announces to Frank that he had scored at the top of the Sergeants' Exam (Frank had not yet looked at the scores and was under the impression that he had declined to take it) and had decided to accept the promotion, which would end his patrol partnership with Eddie and resolve the conflict. Frank then gives his blessing for the marriage, saying he couldn't be happier for Jamie and Eddie.

The Season 9 finale, "Something Blue", ends at the start of the wedding Mass with Archbishop Kearns (Stacy Keach) officiating; as Eddie's father Armin (a convicted racketeer) remains incarcerated, Frank walks Eddie down the aisle at her request.

In the Season 10 episode "Vested Interests," his grandfather Henry said, "I look at [your brother Danny Reagan] and I see a great detective. I look at you and I see a future PC because of your strengths. Your heart, your smarts, the patience of a saint." In a 2022 interview, Will Estes said "Jamie Reagan will probably be the P.C. one day, but I’m not sure it will ever fit into the structure of this Blue Bloods." He is often referred to as a "boy scout" by other characters due to his preference for adhering to the rules.

In the first episode of season 13, Jamie is shot in the abdomen while investigating a suspect. Within a few episodes thereafter, he is back to actively engaging in foot chases. Over the course of Season 13, Jamie becomes a field intelligence sergeant within his precinct. In Season 14, Jamie's undercover mission with a human trafficking ring nearly ends in tragedy when the group realizes an undercover officer is with them, but he is able to improvise and buy the girls some time. He is instructed by his boss to go home and lay low for a few days, allowing him to make it to Sunday dinner and reunite with the family briefly. Joe Hill, working with the FBI on a drug operation, unknowingly interferes in Jamie's undercover operation, leading to conflict between the two that intensifies after Joe angrily brings up his father's death. Jamie and Joe continue their joint investigation, hoping to fulfill Joe's promise to a woman to reunite her with her sister who was kidnapped as part of the ring. Though they succeed in bringing down the human trafficking ring and Jamie's operation is over, the two still do not see eye to eye. Later in the season, Jamie investigates a drug operation involving rival gangs, against his boss's orders. Jamie sees the investigation through anyway, and rather than being suspended or fired, Jamie is promoted due to his boss being impressed with his work. Joe Hill and Jamie's conflict reaches a boiling point when they get into a fight outside of a bar, making Frank livid at their behavior. He forces Jamie and Joe to ride together, and they eventually put some of their animosity aside.

As a uniformed patrol officer, Jamie drives a patrol car on duty and carries a Glock 19 in 9×19mm as his duty weapon; while in plainclothes, Jamie uses the smaller Glock 26 in 9×19mm. While off-duty, Jamie drove his brother Joe's 1971 Chevrolet Chevelle SS until it was sabotaged and totaled by the Blue Templar. He mentioned gradually repairing and restoring it over the next several years, and was next seen driving it in Season 9 Episode 7. At the end of season 14, Jamie and Eddie announce that they are having a baby.

In Boston Blue, it is revealed that he is now the father to a boy named Joseph Francis Reagan. In Season 2, Episode 5, it was revealed that he had been promoted to Lieutenant at the NYPD.

== Partners ==
Over his career, Jamie has had several partners.

- Sergeant Anthony Renzulli (Nicholas Turturro) – Jamie's training officer, Sgt. Renzulli knows the beat of his precinct very well and often offers Jamie good advice when he needs it. He believes Jamie will make a great cop, and often pokes fun at him for abandoning a lucrative law career.
- Officer Vincent Cruz (Sebastian Sozzi) – Jamie's partner who grew up in the Bitterman housing projects neighborhood of New York City. In "The Bitter End", Cruz and Jamie are patrolling near the Bitterman Houses and come across a purse snatcher who leads them on a chase through the project. The purse snatching proves to be a setup, and both officers find themselves under fire from Los Lords gang members. Cruz is hit twice in the neck and despite Jamie's best efforts, he dies at the scene from massive internal bleeding.
- Officer Edit "Eddie" Janko-Reagan (Vanessa Ray) – A younger police officer and Jamie's partner from season 4 until he is promoted to sergeant season 9. Feisty and strongly opinionated, she is very passionate when it comes to her job. Over the course of the series, her latent romantic feelings for Jamie become more apparent. Initially, they mutually decide not to pursue a romantic relationship lest they lose their partnership. However, they announced their engagement to the Reagan family in the season 8 finale, "My Aim Is True". The two wed in the season 9 finale, "Something Blue".

== Reception ==
Evaluating the launch of the show for the Los Angeles Times, reviewer Mary McNamara wrote that "as Jamie, Estes provides the viewer's entrance into a suspicious and suspecting world. McNamara notes that some of the early dramatic tension in the show is established by Jamie's decision to leave Harvard for police work, and investigation of his brother's suspicious death.

Fans were reported to have noted of the character that "while previous seasons displayed his usual easy-going demeanor full of smiles and laughter, Season 13 has replaced it with a constant stoic manner".

=== Awards and nominations ===
Will Estes has won two awards for his performance of the character:

Year	Award	Category	Nominated work	Result	Ref.
2014	Prism Award	Performance in a Drama Series Episode	Blue Bloods	Won	
2015	Golden Honu Award	Actor of the Year	Blue Bloods	Won	
