= Frank Reagan (Blue Bloods) =

- Blue Bloods character
- First appearance: "Pilot"; September 24, 2010
- Last appearance: "End of Tour"; December 13, 2024
- Created by: Robin Green; Mitchell Burgess
- Portrayed by: Tom Selleck

In-universe information
- Full name: Francis Xavier Reagan
- Gender: Male
- Title: New York City Police Commissioner
- Occupation: Police officer/ police commissioner
- Family: Henry Reagan (father); Betty Reagan (mother, deceased); Peter Reagan (brother, deceased)
- Spouse: Mary Margaret Conor (deceased)
- Children: Daniel Fitzgerald "Danny" Reagan; Erin Reagan; Joe Reagan (deceased); Jameson "Jamie" Reagan
- Relatives: Charles Reagan (grandfather, deceased); Teddy Reagan (great-uncle); Nicky Reagan-Boyle (granddaughter); Jack Reagan (grandson); Sean Reagan (grandson); Joe Hill (grandson); Joseph Francis Reagan (grandson)
- Nationality: American (ethnicity: Irish-American)

Police career
- Department: New York City Police Department
- Years of service: 1974 – Present
- Rank: Commissioner
- Awards: US Flag Breast Bar; World Trade Center Breast Bar; NYPD Medal of Honor; NYPD Combat Cross (2); NYPD Meritorious Police Duty; NYPD Excellent Police Duty; NYPD Unit Citation; NYPD 1986 Liberty Breast Bar; NYPD Firearms Proficiency Bar; NYPD Award of Merit

Francis Xavier Reagan is a fictional character from the television series Blue Bloods portrayed by Tom Selleck. In the series, Reagan is the New York City Police Commissioner, the son of a former Commissioner, and the patriarch of a family of police officers and others involved in aspects of the city's criminal justice system. Selleck's performance in the role has been critically praised, but the character has been criticized by some for presenting an overly positive view of law enforcement administration.

== Character analysis and reception ==
Selleck mentioned that he was drawn to the project because of the strong pilot script, though he was concerned about becoming involved in an ongoing series because he did not want to compromise his commitment to the Jesse Stone television movies.

The New York Daily News praised Selleck's performance in the role, drawing comparisons between Selleck's characters Jesse Stone and Frank Reagan, saying that both Reagan and Stone are moral, principled men of few words. In 2017, Selleck was nominated for a People's Choice Award for Favorite TV Crime Drama Actor for his work on the show.

The character has been described as "a wise, benevolent potentate of a police commissioner"; a "no-nonsense police chief" who "runs the force as diplomatically as he runs his family" and as having "strong family values that are inspiring to those around him"; and as a leader who "upholds the law and justice no matter how hard it may be and no matter who breaks the law". However, political scientist George A. Gonzalez has criticized the series generally, and the character of Frank Reagan specifically, as propaganda, noting that the show "equates justice with the NYPD", and that in the politically charged episode "Parenthood", Reagan "refuses to ponder if zealous, or overzealous, enforcement of the law may be unduly punishing political dissent and serve to deter future political protests". In terms of his personal life, Reagan is a widower, and "the family in Blue Bloods is portrayed as deeply Catholic and highly traditional: they meet often for family dinners, always begin the meals with prayers, often explicitly addressing Jesus", but with "no evident concern about traditional Christian teachings on sexual morality", with characters including Reagan having "occasional brief sexual relationships". In the 2014 episode "Burning Bridges", Reagan "criticized the Catholic Church for its stance on homosexuality", a depiction of the character that drew an offended response from Catholic League CEO Bill Donohue, who incorrectly predicted that the show would lose viewership.

Reagan's character draws inspiration from Raymond Kelly, former Commissioner of the NYPD, and Theodore Roosevelt, former President of the Board of Commissioners of the NYPD, who later served as Governor of New York, Vice President, and the 26th President of the United States.

== Family tree ==
Charles | Unnamed Mother
Henry | Betty
Peter | Frank | Mary
Linda | Danny | Jack | Erin | Joe | Paula | Jamie | Eddie
Jack | Sean | Nicky | Joe H.

Grey indicates that the character is deceased

== Biography and family ==
Frank is the younger son of Henry (Len Cariou) and Betty Reagan, born in Bay Ridge, Brooklyn, New York in the early 1950s. His older brother, Peter Christopher Reagan, died of leukemia at the age of 18 months, over a year before Frank was born.

Frank married Mary Margaret Reagan (née Conor) in the early 1970s, and they have four children together: Danny, Erin, Joe, and Jamie. Each of Frank's sons followed him into the NYPD: Danny (Donnie Wahlberg) is a Detective 1st Grade and lead investigator with the 54th Precinct's Detective Squad; Joe was a Detective with the Warrants Squad who was murdered on the orders of his partner Sonny Malevsky (Michael T. Weiss), the leader of a corrupt gang of police officers called the Blue Templar; and Jamie (Will Estes), who received a law degree from Harvard University before joining the force, first as a patrol officer, then as a Sergeant assigned to the 29th Precinct, and later as the Intelligence Officer for the 2-9 as of Season 13, Episode 2. Frank's only daughter, Erin (Bridget Moynahan), is a Manhattan Assistant District Attorney. Erin was promoted to Deputy Bureau Chief of the NYCDA's Trial Bureau in 2013.

In addition to his children, Frank is also a loving grandfather to Erin's daughter, Nicky Reagan-Boyle (Sami Gayle), and Danny's two children, Jack (Tony Terraciano) and Sean Reagan (Andrew Terraciano). It is revealed in Season 10's "Family Secrets" that Frank also has one more grandson, Joseph Hill, the son of Paula Hill, whom Joe Reagan met at the academy. Paula said the two had a brief affair and she never told Joe about her pregnancy or his son. Paula visits Frank and reveals the news in an effort to get her son, a young detective in the firearms unit, assigned to a less dangerous precinct. Soon Joe's connection to the family made public and he leaves for a while but after a dangerous undercover assignment, he returns to his family and comes to accept them, as well as his heritage.

In one episode, it is mentioned that Frank's wife's grandfather was one of the builders on the Brooklyn Bridge in the 1870s and '80s. Frank's dad's father, Charles Reagan, was an Irish immigrant who served in World War I before becoming a police officer. Charles was the one who taught him how to fish. In "Whistle Blower" (season 2, episode 10), Frank mentions his great-uncle Teddy Reagan, a member of the NYPD Mounted Unit, who spent a cold night in a boxcar with his horse, Dolly, and a flask, waking up much later in Pittsburgh.

Growing up, Frank became friends with Angelo Gallo (Chazz Palminteri), who grew up to be one of the top mafia lawyers. After Gallo was shot on the orders of a former client, Frank has him publicly arrested for hindering prosecution, to protect him from being considered a rat. His other close friends include Monsignor Walter Donahue, a member of the city archdiocese, and Kevin Kearns (Stacy Keach), the Archbishop of New York.

However, it is also mentioned that Frank does not have many friends in the New York City Council, especially after Danny's arrest of city Councilman Tony Mancini (Richard Burgi), a former NYPD detective, for domestic abuse.

== Service ==
After serving in the United States Marine Corps during the Vietnam War (during which time he held the rank of Lieutenant and was awarded the Navy & Marine Corps Achievement Medal), Frank became the third generation of Reagans to become a police officer. He began his career as a patrol officer stationed at the 27th Precinct. His shield number as a Patrol Officer was 82632, based on the portrait of him by artist Trudy Slaughter (Mimi Rogers), an old acquaintance of his who was commissioned to paint his official portrait as Commissioner in "Brushed Off", and elected to portray him at the start of their acquaintance. After three years on patrol, he was promoted to Detective 3rd Grade. Since then, he has served in various positions across the city, including Chief of the Brooklyn South Division and the Chief of Department of the NYPD, culminating in being appointed Police Commissioner.

In the 1970s, Frank led the attempt to apprehend Whitey Brennan, the head of the Westies, at his grandson's baptism. Due to the chaos, a shootout ensued in which two police officers were wounded and four people from the Westies were killed, including Whitey's wife and grandson.

In the early 1980s, Frank served in the Canine Unit as a dog handler. However, he transferred out of the unit after Greta, his canine partner, was shot and killed by a burglar Frank sent her in after.

From 1995 to 1999, Frank was the Commanding Officer of the Special Investigations Unit, a special anti-narcotics task force.

On September 11, 2001, Frank was working in the North Tower when the South Tower collapsed. He spent days at Ground Zero, and took refuge at St. Paul's Chapel, where he and other officers slept in the pews.

As Frank began his NYPD service prior to 1994, he is entitled to carry a revolver instead of a semiautomatic pistol as his duty weapon; he prefers a Colt Official Police that originally belonged to his father and grandfather, customized as a FitzGerald Special. He also owns a Colt Government M1911. At one point, he uses it on a serial killer who was about to rape and kill Erin.

== As police commissioner ==
Frank was appointed the Police Commissioner by Mayor Frank Russo (Bruce Altman). In 2011, after the election of Carter Poole (David Ramsey), Frank offers to tender his resignation, but Poole decides to keep Frank on as PC. In 2015, after Mayor Poole's successful reelection, Frank struggles with whether he even wants to stay on for another four years as PC, assuming the mayor even asks him to. He ultimately decides to stay for "as long as the Mayor's head is in his ass" (which was remarked as indefinitely). The mayor officially asks Frank to re-up in February 2016, and he agrees.

Frank has an indifferent attitude toward politics, often taking on the mayor and numerous reporters who misinterpret his actions. He tries hard not to judge people and tends to purse his lips together when hearing bad news or the horrific details of an ongoing case. He also refuses to play favorites; in season 4, he mentions that he is afraid to recommend Jamie, now with four years on the force, for promotion to detective because it would look like nepotism.

In a 2011 episode, Frank was shot by Kevin Brennan (Jack Gwaltney), the son of the former head of the Westies whom Frank had arrested back in the '70s.

In 2013, Frank is the target of an assassination attempt by Hector Santiago (Omar Maskati), a mentally challenged teenager of the Bitterman housing projects who is tricked by a member of the Los Lordes gang who declared war on the NYPD. The bullets miss Frank but hit Mayor Poole and leave him paralyzed and a wheelchair user.

One of Frank's predecessors, "Crooked" Commissioner Connors, served time in a federal prison after his term as PC was completed and left him with more than one mess to clean up, including Officer Thomas Sculley (Warren Kole), one of four patrol officers who, a few months after 9/11, accidentally shot an unarmed Muslim teenager and was acquitted of all charges and allowed by then Commissioner Connors to keep his job. In 2016, Officer Sculley, who had kept his head down for the last 14 years and made great strides to atone for his horrible rookie mistake, passed the Sergeant's exam with flying colors. Frank was reluctant to promote him, lest tensions between the citizens and the police grow even worse, and ultimately offers Officer Sculley a choice: transfer to another city (Long Island, Albuquerque, New Mexico, Boulder, Colorado, or San Diego were among the departments Frank talked to) or take his promotion to Sergeant and ride a desk at the Erie Basin Auto Pound in Brooklyn for the rest of his NYPD career.

In the first season, Frank is well regarded and respected by his officers and his city, to the point where the mayor feels threatened by his popularity; however, by season 6, public opinion regarding the police – and him personally – has changed so drastically that he gets booed off-stage while speaking at Columbia University. However, in season 7, new mayor Margaret Dutton affirms that his polls are better than any of the NY Mayors.

Frank is nearly served with a vote of no confidence by the NYPD rank and file in 2012 when he publicly apologizes for the accidental shooting of a black man by a rookie patrol officer named Blake (played by Corbin Bleu) instead of waiting for the official report.

=== Senior staff ===
The following officers are among Frank's senior staff who assist or have assisted him in his duties as the New York City Police Commissioner.

- First Deputy New York City Police Commissioner – Vincenzo (John Bedford Lloyd)
- Deputy Commissioner, Public Information/de facto Chief of Staff – Garrett Moore (Gregory Jbara)
- Chief of Department – Ed Hines (John Rue) (Ret. 2013)
- Chief of Department – Dino Arbogast (John Ventimiglia) (terminated, 2014)
- Special Assistant to the Commissioner – Lieutenant Sidney Gormley (de facto Chief of Department) (Robert Clohessy)
- Chief of Organized Crime Control Bureau – Bureau Chief Dino Arbogast (John Ventimiglia) (promoted to Chief of Department in a 2013 episode)
- Chief of Intelligence – Bureau Chief Bryce Helfond (Victor Slezak)
- Chief of Gang Division – Deputy Chief Donald Kent (Dennis Haysbert) (promoted to Assistant Chief and then KIA, 2015)
- Chief of Training – Deputy Chief Jane Kimura (Sumalee Montano)
- Chief of Transit – Bureau Chief Thomas Penworth (Lucas Caleb Rooney)
- Primary Aide – Detective 1st Grade Abigail Baker, PC's (Detective) Squad (Abigail Hawk)

== List of assignments ==
The following are Frank's known police assignments.

1. Patrol Officer, NYPD 27th Precinct
2. Patrol Officer, NYPD 25th Precinct
3. Detective, NYPD 21st Precinct
4. Senior Detective, NYPD Homicide
5. Dog handler, NYPD Canine Unit
6. Commanding Officer, NYPD Special Investigations Unit
7. Deputy Chief, NYPD Patrol Borough Brooklyn South
8. Chief of Department, NYPD(Wears the uniform and shield to Academy graduation and other special events as appropriate.)
9. New York City Police Commissioner

== Partners ==
Over his career, Frank has had numerous partners.

- Jimmy Burke (Gary Basaraba) – Frank's partner while stationed at the 27th Precinct who took a bullet for him. He was eventually promoted to inspector and placed in command of the 15th Precinct. While up for a promotion to deputy chief as the deputy commander of Patrol Borough Manhattan South, it was revealed that he had been cooking the books for his precinct's CompStats. Frank allowed him to retire rather than face demotion to captain and reassignment to the 128th Precinct in Staten Island.
- Lenny Ross (Treat Williams) – Frank's partner while stationed at the 25th Precinct; by 2016, Lenny had retired and wrote a book about the bad old days, Back in the Day, detailing their exploits.
- John McKenna – An NYPD officer who was with Frank during 9/11 who later got sick and died from illness he was exposed to during the attacks.
- Greta – When assigned to the Canine Unit as a dog handler, Frank's partner was Greta. He transferred out of the unit after Greta was shot and killed by a burglar Frank sent her in after.
