= Danny Reagan =

- Blue Bloods and Boston Blue character
- Danny Reagan (Donnie Wahlberg)
- First appearance: Blue Bloods: "Pilot"; September 24, 2010; Boston Blue: "Faith & Family"; October 17, 2025
- Last appearance: Blue Bloods: "End of Tour"; December 13, 2024
- Created by: Robin Green; Mitchell Burgess
- Portrayed by: Donnie Wahlberg

In-universe information
- Full name: Daniel Fitzgerald Reagan
- Gender: Male
- Occupation: Police officer
- Family: Francis Xavier "Frank" Reagan (father); Mary Margaret Reagan † (mother); Erin Reagan (younger sister); Joseph Conor "Joe" Reagan † (younger brother); Jameson "Jamie" Reagan (younger brother)
- Spouse: Linda Rose Reagan (née O'Shea) (wife)†
- Significant others: Marianne Romano (ex-girlfriend); Maria Baez (girlfriend)
- Children: Jack Reagan; Sean Reagan
- Relatives: Henry Reagan (grandfather); Nicky Reagan-Boyle (niece); Joe Hill (nephew); Joseph Francis Reagan (nephew)

Police career
- Department: New York City Police Department; Boston Police Department
- Years of service: 1995 – 2025 (NYPD); 2025 – present (Boston PD)
- Rank: Detective 1st Grade (NYPD, Retired), Detective Sergeant (Boston PD)
- Awards: NYPD Medal for Valor

Daniel Fitzgerald "Danny" Reagan is a fictional Boston (formerly New York City) police detective, former marine, and one of the protagonists in the television franchise Blue Bloods and its spinoff series Boston Blue. Introduced in the first episode in 2010, he has been portrayed by actor and New Kids on the Block singer Donnie Wahlberg for the entire run of the franchise.

== Biography ==
The eldest son of the current New York City Police Commissioner Frank Reagan and his wife Mary, Danny grew up in Bay Ridge, Brooklyn with a younger sister, Erin, and two younger brothers, Joe and Jamie. He was happily married to Linda Rose O'Shea from October 1996, with whom he has two sons, Jack (b. October 2000) and Sean (b. circa 2003), until Linda's death off-screen before the start of Season 8 in 2017. They lived at 1712 Amboy Road on Staten Island until a drug cartel retaliated against a recent bust that Danny had made by firebombing their home in the season 7 finale "The Thin Blue Line". The death of Linda in a helicopter crash is later also suggested to be retribution by the drug cartel. During high school, Danny dated Marianne Romano (Charisma Carpenter), who was described by his partner Baez as "the queen bee, super good looking, a little crazy, and dynamite in the sack" to which he agreed. Right after graduating from high school, Danny worked numerous jobs including construction and bartending.

In several episodes in the earlier seasons, it is clearly established in dialogue that Danny was the oldest of the siblings followed by Erin, Joe and Jamie in that order; Frank mentions that Danny was in diapers during the Watergate hearings which took place in 1973–1974, while the final scene at the Reagan family plot in the episode "The Blue Templar" shows Joe's date of birth on his headstone as June 6, 1977. In the Season 2 episode "Mother's Day" revolving around tension between Danny and Jamie, his wife Linda says Joe was the "only thing that you and Jamie had in common" and calls Joe the "bridge" between the two of them. In later seasons, the writers appear to have retconned the order of birth. In the episode "Common Ground", Frank states that Joe was his firstborn and that he misses him every day. He also stated that the boys were 19 months apart and Erin was their younger sister. Therefore, Joe is the oldest, then Danny, Erin and Jamie is the youngest.

For a class project of Nicky's, Danny mentioned that when he was three years old, he wanted to be a firefighter for Halloween, but his grandfather Henry swore that as long as he was alive, no Reagan would ever be a member of the FDNY, got him into a police uniform, and he "never took it off" until he made Detective.

On the job since autumn 1995, Danny took a leave of absence from the New York City Police Department to serve two tours in the Iraq War as a Marine. (He had enlisted and served in the Marines sometime after high school and prior to joining the NYPD, and either stayed in the Marine Corps Reserve and was activated, or volunteered to reenlist at the start of the war.) Danny saw combat in Fallujah, and was the only member of his platoon to come home alive (resulting in some post-traumatic stress). During his time in the Marines, Danny was decorated for heroism.

He is old-school; his hotheadedness and harsh methods of detective work sometimes get him in trouble, which his father worries about. When asked if his son "crosses the line" and violates procedure from time to time, Frank answered, "I think he walks on the line". In a Season 9 conversation with his brother Jamie, who is often referred to as a "boy scout" and considered a future police commissioner, Danny acknowledges that he probably won't advance as far on the job as Jamie, who has become a sergeant, due to his temperament. Danny is hard on other policemen and detectives when he feels they are unprofessional or not doing their duty to its utmost. Having been a Detective since his promotion to Detective 3rd Grade in spring 1999 after three-and-a-half years on the force, he is currently assigned to the Detective Squad of the 54th Precinct, and partnered with Detective Maria Baez. In "Most Wanted", it is mentioned that he leads the Manhattan South Detective Borough in both collars and complaints. In "Love Stories", he and Baez are awarded the NYPD Medal for Valor for their actions in "Partners"; at dinner immediately afterwards, he gives his Medal to Frank, giving Frank long-overdue recognition for an incident that occurred on March 9, 1988, in which an off-duty Frank, then a Detective assigned to the 21st Precinct, singlehandedly apprehended a bank robber who had murdered a teller and wounded 3 other people at the scene, but was never rewarded with the Medal for Valor or a commendation bar for his actions by Henry (the Commissioner at the time), who wanted to avoid favoritism.

As a detective with the NYPD, Danny carries a Kahr K9 in 9×19mm as his duty weapon, and drives a Dodge Charger on duty, which replaced his previous Chevrolet Impala 9C1. He also owns a Glock 19 in 9×19mm, and previously used a Smith & Wesson 5946 in 9×19mm. Danny drove a Jeep XJ Cherokee as his personal/family vehicle from Season 1 to Season 5, whilst Linda drove a rather troublesome 2001 Kia Sedona/Carnival; this vehicle was replaced when Henry lost his driver's license and gave Linda his car. In Season 6, Danny's Cherokee was replaced by a fourth-generation Ford Explorer.

He wears a Meritorious Police Duty pin beginning with the second episode of Season 4 until halfway through Season 6, when he starts wearing a Detective Bureau lapel pin instead. His NYPD shield number is 51466.

In the spin-off Boston Blue, Danny's youngest son Sean moves to Boston to pursue a career in the Boston Police Department (BPD) due to a hiring freeze in the NYPD and as a recommendation by his friend Jonah Silver, who is also a rookie in the BPD. After Sean gets into an accident trying to save lives in a fire, Danny accidentally encounters and works with Jonah's sister Lena Silver, a BPD detective, on the case and later decides to stay in Boston full time while looking after Sean. Later, Lena's stepsister and police superintendent Sara Silver offers Danny a position with the BPD. Meanwhile, the convict sentenced for the murder of the Silver sibling's father is set free and Danny accepts Sara's offer in the BPD to help the Silver family.

== Partners on Blue Bloods ==
Over his career, Danny has had numerous partners, mostly female, some for shorter periods of time, before the longest-lasting partnership with Maria Baez from the middle of Season 3 through the end of the series. The character has addressed this himself, in a conversation with partner Jackie Curatola in the Season 2 episode "Lonely Hearts Club" and with Maria Baez in the Season 11 premiere.

- Detective Darryl Reid (Malik Yoba): As mentioned in a 2015 episode, Reid was partnered with Danny for "eight months seven years ago" (c. 2008). Reid's career came to an end (and put Danny's in jeopardy) when it was revealed that he planted evidence to secure a murder conviction.
- Detective DeMarcus King (Flex Alexander): Was partnered with Danny in the pilot episode.
- Detective Ava Hotchkiss (Yvonna Kopacz Wright): First partner of Danny's when he was assigned to Major Crimes.
- Detective First Grade Jackie Curatola (Jennifer Esposito): From 2010 until 2012, Danny was primarily partnered with Detective Jackie Curatola at the 54th Precinct. In 2012, Jackie took early retirement from the NYPD after starting to show signs of burning out. Jackie later returned in the season 13 finale "Forgive Us Our Trespasses" over ten years later where she is revealed to be the Chief of Police of Suffolk County and assists Danny and Baez with capturing a serial killer.
- Detective Kate Lansing (Megan Ketch): Assigned to replace Detective Curatola in 2012, Detective Kate Lansing worked with Danny for almost three months. She transferred back to Internal Affairs after the arrest of Captain Derek Elwood (Nestor Serrano), who framed Danny for possession of narcotics in order to prevent him from discovering his gambling problem.
- Detective Candice "Mac" McElroy (Megan Boone): A temporary addition to the 54th Precinct, Detective Candice McElroy briefly served as Danny's partner in 2013. She was later transferred to the Vice Enforcement Division.
- Detective First Grade Maria Baez (Marisa Ramirez): Danny's partner since 2013, and someone he has known for over 20 years. She previously spent three years with the Joint Bank Robbery Task Force until it was disbanded in 2011. Due to Reagan's long-standing positive relationship with Baez, fans have speculated that the two of them would become romantically involved. This is proven correct in the first episode of spinoff Boston Blue when they are shown to have been in a committed romantic relationship for about a year.

== Partner on Boston Blue ==
- Detective Lena Silver (Sonequa Martin-Green): Danny's partner when he takes a position with the Boston Police Department.

== Critical reception ==
For his performance in the role, Wahlberg was nominated for a People's Choice Award for Favorite TV Crime Drama Actor in 2017. In 2024, CinemaBlend included the character on their list of the "32 Smartest TV Detectives".
