= Blue Bloods season 1 =

Season of television series

Blue Bloods
- Season 1
- Region 1 DVD cover art
- No. of episodes: 22

Release
- Original network: CBS
- Original release: September 24, 2010 – May 13, 2011

Season chronology
- Next → Season 2

The first season of Blue Bloods, an American police procedural–family drama television series, aired in the United States on CBS between September 24, 2010, to May 13, 2011. The series was created and along with Leonard Goldberg and Michael Cuesta, executively produced by Robin Green and Mitchell Burgess. The show revolves around the Reagan family, consisting of the retired police commissioner, current police commissioner, police officers, and an assistant district attorney, all working with the New York City Police Department (NYPD). Actors Donnie Wahlberg, Bridget Moynahan, Will Estes, Len Cariou and Tom Selleck make up the main cast as the Reagan family—Danny, Erin, Jamie, Henry and Frank.

Blue Bloods' first season aired during the 2010–11 television season on Fridays at 10:00 p.m. EST. The series debuted with the pilot episode, which was viewed by 13.01 million viewers. The season ended with the finale "The Blue Templar", which was watched by 11.79 million viewers. The season averaged 12.58 million viewers per 22 episodes. Internationally, the first season was very successful in Canada, United Kingdom and New Zealand, ranking among the top 30 most watched programs on the respective channels. The first season also garnered positive reviews from television critics, praising the performances of lead actors Donnie Wahlberg and Tom Selleck and the family dynamic among the Reagans.

A running theme through the first season is Jamie's assumption of Joe's investigation. The FBI tried to recruit Jamie, but instead he conducted his own covert investigation into Joe's murder. The corrupt cops were operating within a fraternal organization called the "Blue Templar", and murdered Joe when his covert investigation was getting close to exposing names. Joe's assailants attempt to kill Jamie by sabotaging the brakes in his car; however, this effort backfired. After the failed hit, Jamie informs Frank, Danny, and grandfather Henry about the results of his informal investigation. Along with Frank's prosecutor daughter Erin, the Reagan family completes Joe's Blue Templar investigation. After gathering sufficient evidence to obtain arrest warrants, Frank personally leads a squad of police officers, including Danny and Jamie, to execute the warrant. They arrest the corrupt cops while they are having a covert meeting to divide stolen drug money. The group's leader, a detective named Sonny Malevsky, admits to killing Joe. After his confession, Malevsky commits suicide with his service pistol.

The entire season was released on DVD in Region 1 on September 13, 2011, Region 2 on September 19, 2011, and Region 4 on September 15, 2011.

== Production ==
The first season of Blue Bloods was produced by Panda Productions, Paw In Your Face Productions and CBS Productions. The series aired in the United States on CBS Friday nights at 10:00 P.M. EST and Canada on CTV via simulcast. Internationally, season one aired in New Zealand on TV3 Saturday nights at 9:30 P.M., in Australia on Network Ten for the first twelve episodes (Wednesday nights at 8:30 P.M. for the first six and Friday nights at 9:30 P.M.) and on One for the rest of the season. In a deal with CBS Studios International, the series was acquired by the UK channel Sky Atlantic on January 5, 2011, and was one of the first series to air on the new channel, which launched on February 1, 2011. The series was created by Mitchell Burgess and Robin Green and executive produced by Burgess, Green, producer Leonard Goldberg and director Michael Cuesta. The show was initially run by director Ken Sanzel, but Sanzel left in August 2010 amid alleged creative tension with series star Tom Selleck. Staff directors for the season include Cuesta, Félix Alcalá, Jan Eliasberg, Karen Gaviola, Stephen Gyllenhaal, Ralph Hemecker, Gwyneth Horder-Payton, Frederick K. Keller, Matt Penn, John Polson, Michael Pressman, Rosemary Rodriguez, and Alex Zakrzewski. Episodes were written by a team of writers, which consisted of Burgess, Green, Brian Burns, Siobhan Byrne-O'Connor, Amanda Green, Julie Hébert, Thomas Kelly, Gwendolyn M. Parker, Mark Rosner, Ken Sanzel, Diana Son, and Kevin Wade. Cinematographers hired for the season included Craig DiBona, David Insley, Tim Ives and Teodoro Maniaci. Composers Mark Morgan and Rob Simonsen provided the background music for the season.

In a 2011 interview about possible Emmy Awards recognition, Wahlberg named "Silver Star" as an episode that was important to him.

== Cast ==
The first season featured a cast of five main actors who received star billing. Tom Selleck portrays Francis "Frank" Reagan, the patriarch of the Reagan family, a former Marine, and current Police Commissioner who is notably silent about his political beliefs. Donnie Wahlberg acted as Frank's eldest son Daniel "Danny" Reagan, a hard-nosed NYPD Detective and former Marine who often roughs up his suspects, despite being prohibited to do so. Bridget Moynahan portrays Frank's daughter Erin Reagan-Boyle, an assistant district attorney who abides by the law in her dealings with criminal justice. Will Estes portrayed Frank's youngest son Jamison "Jamie" Reagan, a rookie police officer and graduate from Harvard Law before entering the police academy. Len Cariou played Frank's father Henry Reagan, a retired police commissioner and former Marine who, like Danny, is very vocal about his political beliefs.

In addition to the regular cast, the season also featured actors who received the "also starring" billing, appearing in almost every episode of the season. Jennifer Esposito portrayed Jackie Curatola, an NYPD detective at the precinct and Danny's partner. Nicholas Turturro portrayed Sergeant Anthony Renzulli, Jamie's partner and mentor, who had been a partner of Joe Reagan.

Several recurring characters appeared in the first season. Amy Carlson appeared as Linda Reagan, Danny's wife and mother of two children Jack and Sean. Sami Gayle portrayed Erin's teenage daughter Nicole "Nikki" Reagan-Boyle (Marlene Lawston played this role in the pilot episode). Abigail Hawk portrayed Abigail Baker, Frank's primary aide. Brothers Andrew and Tony Terraciano portray Sean and Jack Reagan, Danny and Linda's sons. Gregory Jbara acted as Garrett Moore, the NYPD's Deputy Commissioner of Public Information. Robert Clohessy played Sgt. Sidney Gormley, the immediate supervisor of Danny and the other detectives at the precinct. Actress Dylan Moore appeared in the first eight episodes as Jamie's short-lasting fiancée Sydney Davenport. Bruce Altman portrayed Mayor Frank Russo, Frank's superior. Andrea Roth appeared in four episodes as Kelly Davidson, a television news reporter who dated Frank. Yvonna Kopacz Wright portrayed Ava Hotchkiss, a detective at the precinct and Danny's temporary partner. Noelle Beck appeared in three episodes as Frank's Deputy Press Secretary Sue Connors. Nick Sandow recurred in four episodes as Lieutenant Alex Bello, an officer at Internal Affairs. Michael T. Weiss portrayed Sonny Malevsky, a detective who had worked with Joe Reagan before his murder. Colleen Clinton appeared as Agent Anderson, an FBI agent who attempts to recruit Jamie for her investigation into the Blue Templar. Bobby Cannavale appeared in three episodes as Charles Rosselini, Erin's boss who becomes romantically involved with her. Robert John Burke portrayed Jyle Hogan in three episodes.

=== Main ===
- Tom Selleck as Police Commissioner Francis "Frank" Reagan
- Donnie Wahlberg as Detective 1st Grade Daniel "Danny" Reagan
- Bridget Moynahan as ADA Erin Reagan
- Will Estes as Officer Jamison "Jamie" Reagan
- Len Cariou as retired Police Commissioner Henry Reagan

=== Recurring ===
- Jennifer Esposito as Detective 1st Grade Jackie Curatola
- Abigail Hawk as Detective 1st Grade Abigail Baker
- Robert Clohessy as Sergeant Sidney "Sid" Gormley
- Gregory Jbara as Deputy Commissioner of Public Information Garrett Moore
- Bruce Altman as Mayor Russo
- Andrea Roth as Kelly Davidson
- Nicholas Turturro as Sergeant Anthony Renzulli
- Amy Carlson as Linda Reagan
- Sami Gayle as Nicole "Nikki" Reagan-Boyle
- Tony Terraciano as Jack Reagan
- Andrew Terraciano as Sean Reagan

== Reception ==
=== Viewership and ratings ===
Blue Bloods premiered with the pilot episode, which attracted 13.01 million viewers. After four episodes, the season received a full order of 22 episodes. The series was the most watched program on Friday nights during its duration and was the second most watched program during its short move to the Wednesday timeslot. Apart from the pilot episode, the most-watched episode of the season was "Little Fish", which accrued a viewership of 12.30 million viewers. The season finale was watched by 11.78 million viewers. The season averaged over 12.58 million viewers and a 7.8/14 household rating, becoming the 19th most-watched series of the 2010-2011 primetime television season. In the 18-49 adult demographic, the season averaged a 2.2 Nielsen rating, equating to 2.88 million viewers and ranking number 85th for the 2010-2011 primetime television season.

In Canada, Blue Bloods stood as a solid performer on CTV, landing within the top twenty of the top programs in Canada. The show ended its first season as the most watched new drama series as well as second most watched new series of the season. The season ranked number five in the 18-49 and 25-54 age demographics. In the United Kingdom, the series was among the weekly top five most viewed program on Sky Atlantic, amassing an audience between 450,000 and 630,000 viewers. In Australia, the series premiered with a strong 1.11 million viewers, but viewership fell to 288,000 viewers by April, prompting Network Ten to move the series to its HD channel One, which premiered the second half of the season on October 31, 2011.

=== Critical reviews ===
Upon the premiere of the pilot episode, the series received positive reviews from television critics. At Metacritic, which assigns a weighted mean rating out of 100 to reviews from television critics, the show received an average score of 70, which indicates "generally favorable review", based on 25 reviews. Reviews for the full season were generally positive.

Nick Hartel of DVD Talk deemed the DVD release of the season as "Recommended", writing that it "should wisely be approached as a family drama that utilizes the police angle as a common bonding element." Hartel lauded Selleck, Wahlberg and Cariou's performances and the family dinners, noting that "the arguments and interruptions that garnish the meals give "Blue Bloods" its most human qualities." Hartel also noted that the series "quickly resort to genre story staples", adding that the "identity crisis of cop drama versus family drama results in the former getting the short end of the stick with many cases feeling like an afterthought or plot contrivance for the Reagans to discuss at the weekly family dinner." C.S. Stonebridge of The Numbers wrote, "The regular crimes are also intriguing enough to carry most episodes, although there were a few too many times where there were pretty big coincidences that strained credibility. But this storyline made watching each episode more important, as opposed to a show like Law & Order, where you could almost literally grab any episode in the show's 20 year run and watch it without having to have seen any of the earlier episodes to know what's going on." Stuart Cummins of What Culture called the series "entertaining police drama that combines the best elements of shows such as Numbers, CSI and Law & Order with the family crises and dramas found in shows like Brothers & Sisters." Chuck Barney of San Jose Mercury News found the cases on the series to "don't carry much of a wow factor" and the show overall lacked "the kind of grittiness that might make it more powerful." Barney however praised the actors' performances and the family dynamic of the Reagans.

Some reviewers, however, share mixed to negative opinion concerning the shows format. DVD Verdict writer Adam Arseneau wrote positively about the season, praising the actors' performances, the family dynamic and the multi-generational police family plot while deeming the family dinners and the lessons doled out from them "smacks of self-righteousness and lazy writing." Arseneau concluded about the season, "If we had genuinely solid material to engage the Reagans, Blue Bloods could be one of the best cop shows on television. As it stands, it rarely transcends average." David Brown from Radio Times gave the season release three stars (out of five), writing "Imagine something that mixes the best elements of Law & Order and Brothers & Sisters and you get the idea." The Guardian writer Michael Hann wrote negatively of the series, noting that "one can know what is happening without even watching the show, since each episode follows the same template."

== Episodes ==
No.	Title	Directed by	Written by	Original release date	Prod. code	U.S. viewers (millions)
1	"Pilot"	Michael Cuesta	Robin Green & Mitchell Burgess	September 24, 2010	101	13.01
Jamie graduates from the Police Academy and joins the NYPD on the same day Teresa Campos, a nine-year-old diabetic Hispanic girl, is abducted while on her way home from school and Danny is assigned to investigate her disappearance. Frank addresses the press regarding the case and has a discussion with Mayor Russo (Bruce Altman) about it. With time at an essence, Danny is questioned about his enhanced interrogation tactics that led to Teresa’s rescue, but also resulted in the kidnapper’s charges being dropped. Jamie is approached about joining the investigation of the Blue Templars.
2	"Samaritan"	Ralph Hemecker	Ken Sanzel	October 1, 2010	102	11.32
The Reagans contemplate the rights and wrongs of taking matters into their own hands after a good Samaritan (with a criminal record) shoots (and kills) a member of a criminal gang that is involved in a string of subway armed robberies and terrorism. After his IA inquiry from the previous kidnapping case, Danny is assigned to major crimes and is involved in the investigation of the subway case.
3	"Privilege"	Stephen Gyllenhaal	Brian Burns	October 8, 2010	103	11.15
Erin, Frank, and Danny seek justice for a college student rape victim when the prime suspect is the son of an Argentinian diplomat who has immunity that he invokes for his son. Jamie continues his training with Sgt. Renzulli.
4	"Officer Down"	Ralph Hemecker	Thomas Kelly	October 15, 2010	104	10.39
The NYPD is dispatched to track down the robbery suspects connected with the murder of a police officer Michelle Martin during a downtown jewelry store heist. Danny and Detective Jackie Curatola work the case. Nicole "Nikki" Reagan-Boyle returns from her trip with her father to San Francisco.
5	"What You See"	Félix Alcalá	Julie Hébert	October 22, 2010	105	11.15
The Reagans debate the pros and cons of profiling Muslims as Frank, Danny, Jamie and the rest of the NYPD search for a bomb that is set to go off in Manhattan on a Saturday afternoon. Erin spends time with Henry at a handball tournament. Linda takes the boys to a Manhattan park and Danny worries when he can’t reach her to warn her because her cell phone dies.
6	"Smack Attack"	Gwyneth Horder-Payton	Siobhan Byrne-O'Connor	October 29, 2010	106	11.61
After three teenage boys die from a drug overdose, Danny sets out to find their narcotic source.
7	"Brothers"	Frederick K. Keller	Mark Rosner	November 5, 2010	107	10.31
When Erin tries to take down Pablo Torres, a gang leader, using his law-abiding high school math teacher/brother as bait, the family debates her methods. Meanwhile, Danny tries to protect Jamie by being tough on the rookie, but things get heated between the brothers at Sunday dinner.
8	"Chinatown"	Michael Pressman	Diana Son	November 12, 2010	108	10.57
After meeting with federal agents in Chinatown regarding the Blue Templar, Jamie witnesses a crime in progress, which results in a suspect getting killed during a pursuit. To avoid Jamie undergoing an investigation by Internal Affairs, Danny works to solve the case and clear Jamie's name. Jamie lies to Internal Affairs over the nature of his meeting, and the FBI agent backs up his story. Meanwhile, Sydney gives Jamie back her engagement ring, and calls off the wedding, effectively ending the relationship.
9	"Re-Do"	Rosemary Rodriguez	Julie Hébert	November 19, 2010	109	11.36
Three dangerous criminals are released from prison due to lapses in DNA testing. One of the criminals is Richard Reed (Toby Leonard Moore), a convicted rapist and murderer, whose "fans" commit similar acts. Reed is about to rape and murder Erin for revenge, when Frank arrives. Reed has overpowered Erin, and seems confident that he can thwart Frank by having a gun and using her as his shield. Frank fires a single shot to Reed's head without injury to Erin.
10	"After Hours"	Alex Zakrzewski	Brian Burns	December 3, 2010	110	11.31
Danny attends to the murder of a popular bouncer outside a nightclub with a flirtatious owner. Frank deals with controversy when his former partner (Gary Basaraba) tampers with arrest records for the previous six months to lower crime rates in his district in hopes of securing a promotion.
11	"Little Fish"	Michael Pressman	Siobhan Byrne-O'Connor	January 19, 2011	111	12.29
Danny and Jackie investigate the murder of a high-end escort after her body is found floating in the East River. Meanwhile at the crime scene, Jamie meets Det. Sonny Malevsky (Michael T. Weiss), his late brother Joe's old partner, and is suspicious of him. Frank vows to bring a killer to justice, when the skeletal remains of a missing boy are finally found 25 years after he disappeared, a case that Frank was emotionally invested in.
12	"Family Ties"	Stephen Gyllenhaal	Mark Rosner	January 26, 2011	113	12.09
Danny explores the world of the Russian mob in Brighton Beach and their politics after the son of a gangster is killed at his wedding party. Meanwhile, Erin is handed a high-profile case of political corruption by her district attorney boss (Bobby Cannavale).
13	"Hall of Mirrors"	Frederick K. Keller	Thomas Kelly	February 2, 2011	112	11.31
Danny is assigned to investigate the attempted assassination of an undercover counterterrorism agent, and he must determine whether the agent’s cover has been blown without disrupting the police activity in the Muslim sleeper cell and informing his partner. Meanwhile, Jamie takes an interest in helping a young woman when she reports unsubstantiated and unforced break-ins at her home. Also, Sonny Malevsky pays Jamie a visit.
14	"My Funny Valentine"	John Polson	Diana Son	February 9, 2011	114	11.79
When a teenager is kidnapped on her way home from school, Danny and Jackie suspect her older boyfriend with a criminal past is involved. Erin's relationship with her boss takes an unexpected turn when her daughter sets them up on a dinner date for Valentine's Day. Frank looks into a case of mistaken identity arrest which involves the son of Inez, a 1PP custodian.
15	"Dedication"	Jan Eliasberg	Kevin Wade	February 18, 2011	115	11.16
When Frank is wounded and almost assassinated in a drive-by shooting outside a restaurant, the police force begins a citywide manhunt. The search eventually points Danny towards Whitey Brennan’s family, a dying crime boss with a grudge against Frank, fomented by a tragic event from their long ago past. Meanwhile, the unresolved case is further complicated by the Reagan family’s plan to attend a dedication ceremony at John Jay College of Criminal Justice of their new atrium in Joe's memory.
16	"Age of Innocence"	Félix Alcalá	Amanda Green	February 25, 2011	116	11.65
When an unidentified teenage girl is found murdered outside of a hotel hosting a debutante ball, Danny and Jackie interrogate a high end prostitute who was seen on the hotel's surveillance footage giving the victim a hard time. Also, Danny gets into hot water with Erin for bringing Nicky to the hotel crime scene, where she witnesses the victim’s lifeless body. Meanwhile, Frank incurs the ire of the mayor’s press secretary when he declines her offer to increase his media profile. Jamie and Renzulli are tasked with tracking down T-Mac, a talented young graffiti artist tagging local businesses.
17	"Silver Star"	Ralph Hemecker	Thomas Kelly	March 11, 2011	117	11.60
When a highly decorated, homeless Afghanistan war veteran’s body is found brutally beaten (and his Silver Star missing) in an alleyway adjacent to a high end nightclub, Danny, a former Marine himself, becomes emotionally involved in solving the murder. Meanwhile, Frank deals with an erroneous newspaper column indicating his interest in running for mayor. Jamie and Renzulli help in canvassing the area for a possible witness to the beating.
18	"To Tell the Truth"	Alex Zakrzewski	Siobhan Byrne-O'Connor	April 1, 2011	119	10.91
Danny witnesses a midnight shooting of citizen David Taylor, perpetrated by Raymundo Salazar, a Peruvian drug lord with a history of witness intimidation. Matters become personal when, just before Danny prepares to testify at Salazar’s grand jury arraignment, the criminal's goons abduct Linda in a blatant attempt to force Danny's silence.
19	"Model Behavior"	Matt Penn	Brian Burns	April 8, 2011	118	10.71
At a fashion show, apparently someone attempts to poison Linda's niece Sophie (Sonya Harum), an up-and-coming model, but succeeds at killing Millie, another model. Danny and Jackie investigate the case and receive a tip from Millie’s assistant Cameron Swanson (Marina Squerciati). Meanwhile, with her niece in a coma, Linda deals with the envy her older sister, Wendy (Sophie's mother), bears towards her. Frank is on a personal mission to discover why St. Luke’s popular pastor, Fr. McMurray is mysteriously being transferred to Bolivia by Bishop Sullivan.
20	"All That Glitters"	Michael Pressman	Gwendolyn M. Parker	April 29, 2011	120	10.06
Frank's frustrations rise when the media sensationalizes the apparent random murder of a tourist, as he steps outside a trendy Lower East Side restaurant for an after dinner cigar. Jamie continues his investigation of the Blue Templars.
21	"Cellar Boy"	Karen Gaviola	Story by : Diana Son; Teleplay by : Diana Son & Robin Green & Mitchell Burgess	May 6, 2011	121	10.38
When the Reagan’s long time next-door neighbors are murdered, the “black sheep” son becomes the prime suspect in his parents’ deaths. Renzulli confronts Jamie about his furtive behavior and Jamie asks Renzulli to trust him. Jamie becomes convinced of being pursued by the Blue Templar when first his gun goes missing and then the brakes of his car are sabatoged, causing him to crash it. Jamie finally comes forward to Danny about investigating the Blue Templar by himself, revealing Joe's final recording given to Jamie by the FBI. (Part 1 of 2)
22	"The Blue Templar"	Frederick K. Keller	Kevin Wade	May 13, 2011	122	11.79
In his attempt to expose the Blue Templar, Frank chooses to bypass Internal Affairs after a drug bust indicates dirty cops are involved. As Frank, Danny, Erin, and Henry work the case from Frank's house with the help of Danny's old friend Cliff from combat, Jamie happens upon a scared young woman, Laura Peck, running about in the street. He helps her to safety, and she reveals she was running away from attempted kidnappers. Jamie is assigned to protect her, and he suspects her best friend, Billy Coffin, after he says "I left work as soon as I heard," even though Laura never contacted anyone after the incident. Meanwhile, Jamie and Laura start developing feelings for each other and share a passionate kiss. After he is relieved of his duties for the day, Jamie's sixth sense tells him something is amiss, and Coffin indeed leads Laura to the men who tried to kidnap her before. Jamie apprehends the men and shoots one of them, saving Laura's life. Coffin's motive is for money, as Laura's father received all the money from his business after it went south. Frank taps into the wire of Sonny Malevsky and several others involved with the Blue Templar (including Internal Affairs investigator Alex Bello). Danny gets evidence from Malevsky's car, which is later dumped at a church, and Danny asks Jackie to trail Damon Camia, who's also involved. Another Templar member runs Jackie off the road, leaving her with minor injuries. Having enough intel, Frank leads several cops, including Danny and Jamie, to arrest the corrupt cops and take their shields after Frank asks which one of them killed Joe. Malevsky eventually confesses to the act before fatally shooting himself. The episode finishes with the Reagan family visiting the graves of their fallen family members, with Joe finally being able to rest in peace with his killer brought to justice. (Part 2 of 2)

== Ratings ==
=== United States ===
No. in		Episode	Air date	Time slot (EST)	18-49 rating		Viewership			Live+7		Ref
series	season	Episode	Air date	Time slot (EST)	Rating	Share	in millions	Nightly rank	Weekly rank	18–49 rating	Viewership	Ref
1	1	Pilot	September 24, 2010	Fridays; 10:00 P.M.	2.2	7	13.01	#1	#17	—N/a	15.27	
2	2	Samaritan	October 1, 2010	Fridays; 10:00 P.M.	2.0	7	11.32	#1	#23	2.6	13.83	
3	3	Privilege	October 8, 2010	Fridays; 10:00 P.M.	1.8	6	11.15	#1	#23	2.5	13.51	
4	4	Officer Down	October 15, 2010	Fridays; 10:00 P.M.	1.7	6	10.40	#1	—N/a	2.3	12.69	
5	5	What You See	October 22, 2010	Fridays; 10:00 P.M.	1.8	6	11.15	#1	#22	2.4	13.32	
6	6	Smack Attack	October 29, 2010	Fridays; 10:00 P.M.	1.8	6	11.61	#1	#21	2.4	13.86	
7	7	Brothers	November 5, 2010	Fridays; 10:00 P.M.	1.8	6	10.31	#1	#25	2.4	12.74	
8	8	Chinatown	November 12, 2010	Fridays; 10:00 P.M.	1.6	5	10.57	#1	#24	—N/a	12.79	
9	9	Re-Do	November 19, 2010	Fridays; 10:00 P.M.	1.6	5	11.36	#1	#22	2.2	13.63	
10	10	After Hours	December 3, 2010	Fridays; 10:00 P.M.	1.7	6	11.31	#1	#12	2.3	13.71	
11	11	Little Fish	January 19, 2011	Wednesdays; 10:00 P.M.	2.0	6	12.29	#2	#13	2.7	14.94	
12	12	Family Ties	January 26, 2011	Wednesdays; 10:00 P.M.	2.1	6	12.09	#2	#7	2.7	14.51	
13	13	Hall of Mirrors	February 2, 2011	Wednesdays; 10:00 P.M.	1.6	5	11.31	#2	#12	2.3	13.73	
14	14	My Funny Valentine	February 9, 2011	Wednesdays; 10:00 P.M.	2.1	6	11.79	#4	#16	—N/a	14.24	
15	15	Dedication	February 18, 2011	Fridays; 10:00 P.M.	1.5	5	11.16	#1	#14	2.2	13.78	
16	16	Age of Innocence	February 25, 2011	Fridays; 10:00 P.M.	1.7	6	11.65	#1	#14	2.4	14.25	
17	17	Silver Star	March 11, 2011	Fridays; 10:00 P.M.	1.8	6	11.60	#1	#11	2.5	14.15	
18	18	To Tell the Truth	April 1, 2011	Fridays; 10:00 P.M.	1.7	5	10.92	#1	#19	2.5	13.85	
19	19	Model Behavior	April 8, 2011	Fridays; 10:00 P.M.	1.6	5	10.71	#1	#19	2.2	13.42	
20	20	All That Glitters	April 29, 2011	Fridays; 10:00 P.M.	1.6	5	10.06	#1	#17	2.4	13.01	
21	21	Cellar Boy	May 6, 2011	Fridays; 10:00 P.M.	1.5	5	10.38	#1	#17	2.2	12.77	
22	22	The Blue Templar	May 13, 2011	Fridays; 10:00 P.M.	1.8	5	11.79	#1	#12	2.6	14.60	

=== Canada ===
No. in		Episode title	Air date	Time slot (EST)	Viewership		Ref
series	season	Episode title	Air date	Time slot (EST)	in millions	Weekly rank	Ref
1	1	Pilot	September 24, 2010	Fridays; 10:00 pm	2.126	#12	
2	2	Samaritan	October 1, 2010	Fridays; 10:00 pm	1.585	#21	
3	3	Privilege	October 8, 2010	Fridays; 10:00 pm	1.744	#16	
4	4	Officer Down	October 15, 2010	Fridays; 10:00 pm	1.937	#12	
5	5	What You See	October 22, 2010	Fridays; 10:00 pm	1.767	#13	
6	6	Smack Attack	October 29, 2010	Fridays; 10:00 pm	1.720	#17	
7	7	Brothers	November 5, 2010	Fridays; 10:00 pm	1.602	#20	
8	8	Chinatown	November 12, 2010	Fridays; 10:00 pm	1.630	#19	
9	9	Re-Do	November 19, 2010	Fridays; 10:00 pm	1.608	#25	
10	10	After Hours	December 3, 2010	Fridays; 10:00 pm	1.756	#11	
11	11	Little Fish	January 19, 2011	Wednesdays; 10:00 pm	1.598	#15	
12	12	Family Ties	January 26, 2011	Wednesdays; 10:00 pm	1.662	#11	
13	13	Hall of Mirrors	February 2, 2011	Wednesdays; 10:00 pm	1.576	#19	
14	14	My Funny Valentine	February 9, 2011	Wednesdays; 10:00 pm	1.769	#17	
15	15	Dedication	February 18, 2011	Fridays; 10:00 pm	1.769	#17	
16	16	Age of Innocence	February 25, 2011	Fridays; 10:00 pm	1.963	#11	
17	17	Silver Star	March 11, 2011	Fridays; 10:00 pm	1.479	#20	
18	18	To Tell the Truth	April 1, 2011	Fridays; 10:00 pm	1.794	#10	
19	19	Model Behavior	April 8, 2011	Fridays; 10:00 pm	1.664	#15	
20	20	All That Glitters	April 29, 2011	Fridays; 10:00 pm	1.486	#15	
21	21	Cellar Boy	May 6, 2011	Fridays; 10:00 pm	1.456	#20	
22	22	The Blue Templar	May 13, 2011	Fridays; 10:00 pm	1.799	#17	

=== United Kingdom ===
All viewing figures and ranks are sourced from BARB.

No. in		Episode	Air date	Time slot (UTC)	Sky Atlantic	
series	season	Episode	Air date	Time slot (UTC)	Viewers (millions)	Weekly rank
1	1	Pilot	February 1, 2011	Tuesdays; 10:00 pm	—N/a	—N/a
2	2	Samaritan	February 8, 2011	Tuesdays; 10:00 pm	0.626	#1
3	3	Privilege	February 15, 2011	Tuesdays; 10:00 pm	0.584	#2
4	4	Officer Down	February 22, 2011	Tuesdays; 10:00 pm	0.551	#2
5	5	What You See	March 1, 2011	Tuesdays; 10:00 pm	0.582	#2
6	6	Smack Attack	March 8, 2011	Tuesdays; 10:00 pm	0.530	#2
7	7	Brothers	March 15, 2011	Tuesdays; 10:00 pm	0.499	#2
8	8	Chinatown	March 22, 2011	Tuesdays; 10:00 pm	0.452	#2
9	9	Re-Do	March 29, 2011	Tuesdays; 10:00 pm	0.451	#2
10	10	After Hours	April 5, 2011	Tuesdays; 10:00 pm	0.517	#2
11	11	Little Fish	April 12, 2011	Tuesdays; 10:00 pm	0.540	#1
12	12	Family Ties	April 19, 2011	Tuesdays; 10:00 pm	0.489	#2
13	13	Hall of Mirrors	April 26, 2011	Tuesdays; 10:00 pm	0.521	#2
14	14	My Funny Valentine	May 3, 2011	Tuesdays; 10:00 pm	0.473	#2
15	15	Dedication	May 10, 2011	Tuesdays; 10:00 pm	0.465	#2
16	16	Age of Innocence	May 17, 2011	Tuesdays; 10:00 pm	0.472	#2
17	17	Silver Star	May 24, 2011	Tuesdays; 10:00 pm	0.539	#2
18	18	To Tell the Truth	May 31, 2011	Tuesdays; 10:00 pm	0.503	#2
19	19	Model Behavior	June 7, 2011	Tuesdays; 10:00 pm	0.525	#2
20	20	All That Glitters	June 14, 2011	Tuesdays; 10:00 pm	0.493	#2
21	21	Cellar Boy	June 21, 2011	Tuesdays; 10:00 pm	0.478	#3
22	22	The Blue Templar	June 28, 2011	Tuesdays; 10:00 pm	0.471	#1

=== Australia ===
No. in		Episode title	Air date	Time slot	Viewership			Ref
series	season	Episode title	Air date	Time slot	in millions	Nightly rank	Weekly rank	Ref
1	1	Pilot	February 2, 2011	Wednesdays; 8:30 P.M.	1.107	#8	#23	
2	2	Samaritan	February 9, 2011	Wednesdays; 8:30 P.M.	0.701	#17	#63	
3	3	Privilege	February 16, 2011	Wednesdays; 8:30 P.M.	0.653	#20	#74	
4	4	Officer Down	February 23, 2011	Wednesdays; 8:30 P.M.	0.467	#22	#74	
5	5	What You See	February 23, 2011	Wednesdays; 8:30 P.M.	0.377	#27	—N/a	
6	6	Smack Attack	March 2, 2011	Wednesdays; 8:30 P.M.	0.565	#20	#83	
7	7	Brothers	March 11, 2011	Fridays; 9:30 P.M.	0.283	#32	—N/a	
8	8	Chinatown	March 18, 2011	Fridays; 9:30 P.M.	0.387	#21	—N/a	
9	9	Re-Do	March 25, 2011	Fridays; 9:30 P.M.	0.337	#25	—N/a	
10	10	After Hours	April 1, 2011	Fridays; 9:30 P.M.	0.318	#28	—N/a	
11	11	Little Fish	April 8, 2011	Fridays; 9:30 P.M.	0.286	#30	—N/a	
12	12	Family Ties	April 15, 2011	Fridays; 9:30 P.M.	0.288	#31	—N/a	

== DVD release ==
Blue Bloods - The 1st Season
Set details		Special features
22 episodes; 6-disc set (DVD); 1.78:1 aspect ratio; Subtitles: English, French, Spanish, Portuguese; English: Dolby Digital 5.1, Stereo; French: Stereo		Featurettes; "Analyzing the Scene"; "Code Blue"; "Creating the Characters"; "Empire State of Mind"; "Keeping it in the Family"; "Keeping it Real"; Deleted scenes; Gag reel; Network on-air promos
DVD release date
Region 1	Region 2	Region 4
September 13, 2011	September 19, 2011	September 15, 2011
