= Blue Bloods season 10 =

Season of American television series Blue Bloods

Blue Bloods
- Season 10
- Season 10 U.S. DVD cover
- No. of episodes: 19

Release
- Original network: CBS
- Original release: September 27, 2019 – May 1, 2020

Season chronology
- ← Previous; Season 9 Next → Season 11

The tenth season of Blue Bloods, a police procedural drama series created by Robin Green and Mitchell Burgess, premiered on CBS September 27, 2019, with the first episode of the season celebrating the series' milestone 200th episode. Each season typically has 22 episodes, but due to production being halted during the COVID-19 pandemic, episode 19 served as the de facto season 10 finale.

== Cast ==
Donnie Wahlberg (Danny Reagan), Bridget Moynahan (Erin Reagan), Will Estes (Jamie Reagan), and Len Cariou (Henry Reagan) are first credited. Sami Gayle (Nicky Reagan-Boyle) is credited next, marking the sixth season she has been included in the opening credits. (Gayle left the show after Episode 5 but returned for Episode 16.) Tom Selleck (Frank Reagan) receives an "and" billing at the close of the main title sequence.

Marisa Ramirez, as Danny's partner Detective Maria Baez, and Vanessa Ray, as Jamie's former partner (now wife) Eddie Janko-Reagan, continue to receive "also starring" billing for season 10. Gregory Jbara as Deputy Commissioner of Public Information Garrett Moore, Robert Clohessy as Lt. Sidney Gormley, and Abigail Hawk as Detective Abigail Baker, Frank's primary aide, appear regularly and receive "special guest star" billing.

=== Main ===
- Tom Selleck as NYPD Police Commissioner Francis "Frank" Reagan
- Donnie Wahlberg as Detective 1st Grade Daniel "Danny" Reagan
- Bridget Moynahan as ADA Erin Reagan
- Will Estes as Sergeant Jamison "Jamie" Reagan
- Len Cariou as New York City Police Commissioner Henry Reagan (Retired)
- Sami Gayle as Nicole "Nicky" Reagan-Boyle
- Marisa Ramirez as Detective 1st Grade Maria Baez
- Vanessa Ray as Officer Edit "Eddie" Janko

=== Recurring ===
- Abigail Hawk as Detective 1st Grade Abigail Baker
- Gregory Jbara as Deputy Commissioner of Public Information Garrett Moore
- Robert Clohessy as Lieutenant Sidney "Sid" Gormley
- Stacy Keach as Archbishop Kevin Kearns
- Steve Schirripa as DA Investigator Anthony Abetemarco
- Will Hochman as Detective 3rd Grade Joseph "Joe" Hill
- Lauren Patten as Officer Rachel Witten
- Peter Hermann as Jack Boyle
- Tony Terraciano as Jack Reagan
- Andrew Terraciano as Sean Reagan
- Treat Williams as Lenny Ross
- Callie Thorne as Maggie Gibson

=== Guest ===
- Bonnie Somerville as Paula Hill
- Whoopi Goldberg as Regina Thomas
- Lyle Lovett as Texas Ranger Waylon Gates

== Episodes ==
No. overall	No. in season	Title	Directed by	Written by	Original release date	Prod. code	U.S. viewers (millions)
200	1	"The Real Deal"	David M. Barrett	Siobhan Byrne O'Connor & Kevin Wade	September 27, 2019	1001	7.85
Maggie (Callie Thorne), the medium who previously helped Danny and Baez, returns with a year-old homicide. More victims are found, and Maggie stops another murder, but the killer kidnaps Maggie and threatens to blow her up. Danny saves Maggie and they appear to grow closer, to Baez’s chagrin. The daughter of Lenny Ross (Treat Williams) is arrested and had pulled DNA from her half-sister, Lenny’s actual biological daughter. After Lenny admits the "perfect" Reagans made him uncomfortable with bringing up children, Frank invites Lenny as Sunday dinner's first outsider, upon Henry’s suggestion. They cause contention until Jamie deduces that the uber-bickering was intentional. Lenny thanks Frank for the gesture. Erin faces off against an attorney from her past, who defends a wealthy man accused of repeatedly assaulting his girlfriend. The woman testifies she was never abused, and is later stabbed. While apartment hunting, Jamie and Eddie find too good a deal based on being a Reagan which Jamie turns down. They settle on a smaller apartment, with Eddie working nights at the 29th precinct.
201	2	"Naughty or Nice"	John Behring	Ian Biederman	October 4, 2019	1002	7.44
Frank and Erin are at odds when Frank learns the D.A.'s office keeps a "naughty list" of NYPD cops they consider unreliable, to the point where they won't prosecute some cases those cops work for fear that the defense will use their history against them. Danny and Baez work a case of a restaurant owner who was killed by a mob hitman, and recruit retired mobster Vincent Rella (Dan Hedaya) to assist in their investigation. Meanwhile, Jamie is tagged to participate in a decoy operation to take down a predator who is targeting cab drivers. This puts him at odds with Eddie, who had previously asked to be the decoy and wrongfully believes that Jamie requested the assignment just to protect her.
202	3	"Behind the Smile"	Ralph Hemecker	Daniel Truly	October 11, 2019	1003	7.64
Frank's esteem for a late friend proves to be a mistake when her son threatens to publicly reveal the kind of person she really was. Jamie seeks help from Erin to capture the perpetrator who shot at him and a rookie cop, after learning she chose not to send him to prison six months ago. This leads to Anthony working with his brother, a former mobster, to catch the criminal. Meanwhile, Eddie struggles with her unreasonable boss, Sergeant McNichols (Stephanie Kurtzuba), after taking some initiatives while investigating a murder at a community pool; McNichols berates Eddie for being a part of the Reagan family and "putting herself in charge of a crime scene" despite Eddie doing her job. Also, Danny drags a reluctant Baez into a case involving a suspicious Chinese immigrant couple who are grieving at the morgue. Due to their immense distaste for cops — whom they still associate with the brutal authoritarian regime they came to the United States to escape — they disowned their son, Officer Chen, after he became one. They now blame themselves for the death of their daughter, having refused to go to the police after she married an abusive man. Chen nearly goes off when apprehending his sister's husband, while the detectives discover that the woman is actually alive and being held captive. Nicky announces during the family dinner that she is heading to San Francisco for a job interview.
203	4	"Another Look"	Jackeline Tejada	Brian Burns	October 18, 2019	1004	7.44
Frank takes one of Jamie's cases to heart when it involves the death of FBI Agent Wilson Ortega's (Emiliano Díez) terminally ill wife. A longtime friend of Wilson's, Frank grapples with the possibility that Wilson may have ended his wife's life per her request. Meanwhile, Erin needs Anthony's help on a string of unsolved robbery cases. The shop owner victims all happen to be undocumented immigrants who refuse to appear in court, ultimately forcing Anthony to go undercover as a shop owner himself to catch the crook. Also, Danny reunites with an old friend from the job who had previously retired; he helps Danny and Baez in a case where a young woman accuses an older man of rape. The man only remembers drinking with the young woman, and nothing after. Danny discovers the man's wife, who was in the midst of a nasty divorce and custody battle with him, paid the girl to spike her husband's drink and file a false claim. Frank later visits Jamie to discuss Mary's illness and death and how the situation with Ortega and his wife reminded him of her.
204	5	"The Price You Pay"	John Behring	Kevin Riley	October 25, 2019	1005	6.91
Frank works to vindicate Detective Douglas McKenzie (Mike Carlsen), who stands accused of exerting excessive force. The situation hits home, as it was Frank who initially reported McKenzie to internal affairs. McKenzie ultimately resigns from the force after protesters show up at his residence as he takes his daughters to school. Meanwhile Danny and Baez become reacquainted with rapper Cameron Gooding after a drive-by shooting kills his bodyguard. The intended victim was Gooding, and the detectives apprehend the perp Ky Bishop before he can finish the job at Gooding's next scheduled concert. Jamie is skeptical about a relationship between Espinoza (Luis Antonio Ramos) and a new rookie officer, Sarah Brooks (Lilly Brown), after Espinoza refuses to let Jamie discipline Brooks following two procedural violations. Espinoza admits that Brooks is the daughter of his late best friend who died in the 9-11 attacks, and he wanted to watch out for her and guide her on the right path. Also, Eddie goes undercover to help Erin and Anthony investigate a mysterious cult, whose leader is thought to be responsible for the recent disappearance of a young woman. During Sunday dinner, Nicky reveals she's been hired for the job she interviewed for in San Francisco.
205	6	"Glass Houses"	Heather Cappiello	Teleplay by : Allie Solomon & Kevin Wade; Story by : Allie Solomon & Peter D'Antonio	November 1, 2019	1006	7.61
Frank is unsure of how to deal with a former officer, Rick Austin (Evan Arthur Hall), who gripes about his pension. Austin raises money via motivational speaking that also criticizes the NYPD, and by department rules must claim that income against his pension, but Gormley finds out that Austin lied about the circumstances of his career-ending accident. Meanwhile, Jamie's friend Connor O'Brien (Brian Hutchison) finds illicit photographs of his daughter on the internet, thought to be "revenge porn" posted by an angry ex-boyfriend. Jamie brings in Eddie to help, only for them to learn that the girl posted the photos herself in order to frame the boy who broke up with her. Anthony confronts the realization that his foster son, Sam (Jaden Michael), might not be suited for police work. Sam fails the police exam the first time and refuses to take it again, ultimately resulting in him running away. Anthony later tells Sam that he'll always be there if he needs him. Also, Danny and Baez investigate a murder that forces them to look into an old case where the accused, recently released from prison on a technicality, could truly be innocent of the crime.
206	7	"Higher Standards"	David M. Barrett	Teleplay by : Siobhan Byrne O'Connor; Story by : Siobhan Byrne O'Connor & James Nuciforo	November 8, 2019	1007	7.39
Jamie and Frank are at odds over how the public treats police officers after rowdy teens pour water on two rookies, especially when Jamie's reaction to the incident goes public. Frank reminds Jamie that, like it or not, being named Reagan holds him to a higher standard as a cop. Meanwhile, Danny and Baez investigate a man who preys on the elderly. When one of the man's victims later dies in the hospital, they ultimately trick him into confessing to lesser assault charges while identifying photos of people he's targeted. Also, Erin must admit her wrongdoings when Jack (Peter Hermann) brings her an old case and claims a man she put away five years ago was falsely convicted.
207	8	"Friends in High Places"	Jennifer Opresnick	Ian Biederman	November 15, 2019	1008	7.51
Henry begins working for child services as an investigative consultant. He and Danny work the case of a woman whose estranged husband (who has a record) is paranoid over her taking their son in the divorce. While Henry is more willing to give him the benefit of the doubt, Danny is concerned over the man's angry visits to his wife. The wife goes to Danny with a fear that her husband may have abducted their son, but he has only taken him to a hockey game. Meanwhile, Frank is caught in a crossfire while the police and the fire departments battle it out after the FDNY commissioner (Dan Lauria) provokes a cop following a misunderstanding. Erin ponders a life-challenging opportunity presented to her by Mayor-elect Peter Chase (Dylan Walsh), who endorses her for the district attorney's office. Her family expresses support, but Erin is more reluctant to take that step and settles on telling Chase she is still considering it. Also, Eddie is partnered with veteran cop Kenneth Troy (Eric Troy Miller), and they collar a man who carries a gun that matches the description of a weapon used in a recent double homicide. Jamie is suspicious that Troy may have planted illicit drugs as a reason to search the perp's vehicle, leading to another argument with Eddie. Jamie gives Troy an ultimatum to put in his papers to keep his pension and keep Eddie from being labeled as a rat.
208	9	"Grave Errors"	Robert Harmon	Daniel Truly	November 22, 2019	1009	7.57
While working on a case of a nanny accused of abuse, Erin disagrees with a psychiatric consultant, Dr. Alice Dornan (Jennifer Bowles), regarding her diagnosis and punishment suggestion. Anthony suggests that recent changes in Erin's life (including the Mayor-elect endorsing her for the D.A.'s office and Nicky moving to San Francisco) may be clouding her judgment. Meanwhile, Eddie confronts her boss, Sergeant McNichols (Stephanie Kurtzuba), who has a personal vendetta against the commissioner and the Reagan family name. Also, Mayor-elect Peter Chase pushes Frank to make staffing changes, namely replacing Garrett with a new DCPI, and Danny goes undercover on a case when a woman claims to have heard someone plotting a murder at the bar where she works. Danny remembers an incident at this same bar that resulted in one of his first-ever collars, and correctly deduces he's being set up by the woman and the suspect she named.
209	10	"Bones to Pick"	David M. Barrett	Brian Burns	December 6, 2019	1010	7.33
After a woman is found dead at a men's-only club, Danny and Baez investigate whether her death was foul play or accidental, with Baez personally getting involved due to disliking the club's policy against allowing women. Frank gets wind of an alleged extramarital affair between the chief of Internal Affairs and the spouse of another member of law enforcement, and enlists Baker and Gormley to retrieve further information. Meanwhile, Eddie argues gender politics with Jamie after giving him a "honey-do" list, later revealing feelings of insecurity to Jamie regarding how his siblings' marriages have ended and the fact they don't often see each other due to working opposite shifts. Also, despite Erin telling him to drop it, Anthony tails a habitual thief that was released with no bond, ultimately putting himself in harm's way. Note: Dedicated to show creator Leonard Goldberg.
210	11	"Careful What You Wish For"	Rachel Feldman	Kevin Riley & Allie Solomon	January 3, 2020	1011	7.68
After an EMT is shot and killed in what turns out to be a fake call (with Jamie escaping serious injury), Danny and Baez learn it's one of many recent calls that resulted in drugs being stolen from ambulances. They soon also discover that it may be an inside job. Frank defends New York's homeless community after the newly sworn-in Mayor Chase insists that the NYPD strictly enforce vagrancy laws, especially in areas frequented by tourists. Meanwhile, Erin tries to put away a perp with a violent past after a judge shockingly allows him to walk on a drug charge; it is soon revealed that the judge is a childhood friend of the defendant, whose cohort ambushes her at her house only to get shot. Also, Eddie offers to help Jamie pay off his student loans from a trust fund left by her father, but Jamie is concerned that the money may be dirty. Eddie picks yet another fight with Jamie due to what she misconstrues as Jamie calling Armin a crook.
211	12	"Where the Truth Lies"	David M. Barrett	Siobhan Byrne O'Connor	January 10, 2020	1012	7.91
Frank takes heat when a widow, Rosemary Martin, blames him for her husband's recent suicide while on the job. Rosemary criticizes the NYPD for not having each others' backs as much as it appears, and an investigation reveals that her husband had an affair and was being blackmailed for it. Frank decides to keep this information from Rosemary, earning more anger due to not providing the results of the investigation. Frank discreetly arranges for Rosemary to speak to the officers in her husband's precinct. Also, when Eddie has a gut feeling about a murder, she and Erin band together to solve the case, but not before Erin earns Eddie's anger by telling her what she usually tells Danny about a case (she needs concrete evidence as opposed to a gut feeling). Meanwhile, a desperate Luis Delgado (Lou Diamond Phillips) tells Danny and Baez that the only way he'll testify against his former cartel is if they protect his sons. After a cartel member abducts one of the boys, the investigator working with Danny and Baez urges the detectives to lie in order for Delgado to testify in court. However, Danny and Baez resolve to rescue the boy in time, and do so by goading the cartel member to reveal where they're keeping Delgado's son by bringing his pregnant wife in on charges of her own.
212	13	"Reckless"	John Behring	Jack Ciapciak	January 31, 2020	1013	7.53
Frank and Sid must uncover the truth when an undercover officer accuses a fellow cop of police brutality. After a private meeting with the accuser, Frank implores Sid to decide on punishment for the accused officer, and Sid decides to suspend him indefinitely rather than fire him from the force. Also, Danny and Baez investigate the murder of a famous photographer recently accused of assault by his former models. The photographer was married, leading Danny to suspect the models or the photographer's wife, but all the potential suspects are cooperative in the investigation. The father of the nanny (who happened to be pregnant with the photographer's baby and lied to her father about having been raped), is found to be responsible for the act. Elsewhere, Erin struggles to protect a witness as new justice reform laws go into effect, and Jamie investigates when several cops are accused of handing accident reports (and by extension, victims' private information) to a doctor instead of keeping the matter confidential.
213	14	"The Fog of War"	Doug Aarniokoski	Ian Biederman	February 14, 2020	1014	7.45
Danny and Baez work with Texas Ranger Waylon Gates (Lyle Lovett), when they are put on a case to find The Lone Star Killer who had become involved with the Ace Double Tres drug gang in New York. Meanwhile, Eddie's partner, Officer James Addison (Justin Cunningham), mistakenly shoots an undercover cop during a drug bust operation; the shot officer later dies from her injuries. Internal Affairs accuses Jamie of not supervising properly and Frank speaks with Officer Addison about why he shouldn't turn in his shield. Also, Erin has a disagreement with Mayor Chase when the shooting of two muggers on the street is revealed to be an act of vigilantism by a man whom the thieves previously victimized.
214	15	"Vested Interests"	Alex Zakrzewski	Daniel Truly	March 6, 2020	1015	7.31
Jamie becomes the subject of an IAB investigation when his police vest is found on a perp, and Frank tries to aid and protect an old friend, Chuck Kennedy (Ed Asner), whose home was invaded. Meanwhile, Danny and Baez investigate the suspicious circumstances surrounding the death of a hotel employee initially believed to be a suicide. Also, Erin asks Anthony to make a deal with an accused mobster, who reveals just before his trial that he knows secrets about corruption in the DA's office.
215	16	"The First 100 Days"	Robert Harmon	Brian Burns	March 13, 2020	1016	8.14
Frank and Garrett devise a plan to convince Mayor Chase to work better with others, in order to properly run the city. Meanwhile, Danny and Baez track down a perp who vandalized several NYPD vehicles with anti-cop graffiti and made threats against officers; the accused is an honors student whose older brother (who had a lengthy record) was killed by cops. Danny is especially tense about this case, but encourages the young man to stay on the right path instead of going down the same road his brother did. Erin is shaken after she's in a car accident, to the point where she tells her ex-husband Jack how much he had hurt her over the years. Nicky also visits from San Francisco, which cheers up Erin a little, but she takes it especially rough at Sunday dinner when her family members discuss the police work they had been up to that week. Erin later goes to dinner with Jack and Nicky; Jack has Nicky run a short errand, so he can formally apologize to Erin. Elsewhere, Eddie and Jamie argue about whether they should keep a stray dog who led Eddie and Rachel to a crime scene. Jamie is reluctant to keep the dog after it runs amok in his office, but agrees to keep it at the precinct after it gives him and Eddie another collar naming it Jamko.
216	17	"The Puzzle Palace"	Dean White	Kevin Riley	April 3, 2020	1017	8.77
Erin and Anthony must trust Donnie Hassett (Mark Deklin), a sociopath claiming to have evidence to convict a double-murderer. Also, Frank faces backlash from his department when he suspends an officer for violent behavior. Meanwhile, Danny and Baez try to arrest a notorious hitman who appears to have people inside the department covering for him. Elsewhere, Jamie and Eddie's elderly neighbor (Susan Blommaert) who has dementia accuses the "plumber" (who is really the building manager) of stealing her rings and other valuables. Jamie investigates the theft and arrests the woman's ex-husband for larceny.
217	18	"Hide in Plain Sight"	Doug Aarniokoski	Allie Solomon & Kevin Wade	April 24, 2020	1018	8.02
Danny and Baez are faced with tracking down a dealer of dangerous weight loss drugs after two young models are found dead from an overdose. Elsewhere, Eddie and Jamie team up to determine who masterminded an electronics store robbery, after learning it was carried out by students who are home because of a teachers strike. Meanwhile, Erin’s investigation into an arson is compromised when a young ADA is ambushed by the press and inadvertently leaks details. Also, Archbishop Kearns asks Frank to look into an allegation of inappropriate behavior between a priest and an 11-year-old altar boy. However, during the investigation Frank discovers that the boy is actually the priest's son due to an affair the priest had with the boy's mother who oversees his home. When he reveals this information to Kearns, Kearns admits that the priest will have to be transferred to another parish due to the priest refusing to stop being a part of his son's life.
218	19	"Family Secrets"	David M. Barrett	Siobhan Byrne O'Connor	May 1, 2020	1019	8.52
After getting a match for an unknown first cousin from a DNA network, Sean Reagan does some detective work to figure out who this mystery person might be. Frank gets a request from a woman, Paula Hill (Bonnie Somerville) to transfer her son (Will Hochman), a detective in firearms, to a safer assignment. She reveals to Frank that her son's father is Joe Reagan; they had a fling when they were young, she kept the information from him, and she named her son after his father. Frank meets with the younger Joe, but doesn't reveal he's Joe's grandfather, as Joe is still unaware. During their meeting, Frank realizes Joe loves working in firearms and does great work there, so Paula concludes Frank won't transfer him. She tells Frank not to contact either of them again, but Joe and Sean get in touch, and the former joins the family for Sunday dinner. Also, Danny seeks to uncover the truth behind the murder of a key witness in one of Erin's cases, coming to the conclusion that the victim's girlfriend tipped off the murderer. Meanwhile, Eddie and Jamie discover a newborn boy left outside their precinct. They attempt to find the mother, who had panicked after two members of an infant trafficking ring (posing as adoption lawyers) sought her baby, leaving him at the steps of the precinct in hopes of protecting him. After a reunion between mother and son at the hospital, an emotional Eddie begins to seriously consider having children with Jamie. Note: Won the Movieguide Faith & Freedom Award for TV.

== Ratings ==
Viewership and ratings per episode of Blue Bloods season 10
No.	Title	Air date	Rating/share (18–49)	Viewers (millions)	DVR (18–49)	DVR viewers (millions)	Total (18–49)	Total viewers (millions)
1	"The Real Deal"	September 27, 2019	0.6/3	7.85	0.6	4.56	1.2	12.42
2	"Naughty or Nice"	October 4, 2019	0.6/4	7.44	0.6	4.50	1.2	11.95
3	"Behind the Smile"	October 11, 2019	0.6/4	7.64	0.6	4.31	1.2	11.96
4	"Another Look"	October 18, 2019	0.6/4	7.44	0.5	4.17	1.1	11.61
5	"The Price You Pay"	October 25, 2019	0.6/3	6.91	0.5	4.25	1.1	11.16
6	"Glass Houses"	November 1, 2019	0.6/4	7.61	0.5	4.27	1.1	11.88
7	"Higher Standards"	November 8, 2019	0.6/4	7.39	0.6	4.28	1.2	11.67
8	"Friends in High Places"	November 15, 2019	0.6/3	7.51	0.5	4.36	1.1	11.87
9	"Grave Errors"	November 22, 2019	0.7/4	7.57	0.5	4.16	1.2	11.73
10	"Bones to Pick"	December 6, 2019	0.6/4	7.33	0.5	4.21	1.1	11.54
11	"Careful What You Wish For"	January 3, 2020	0.7/4	7.68	0.5	4.07	1.2	11.75
12	"Where the Truth Lies"	January 10, 2020	0.7/4	7.91	0.5	4.10	1.2	12.01
13	"Reckless"	January 31, 2020	0.6	7.53	0.5	4.45	1.1	11.98
14	"Fog of War"	February 14, 2020	0.7	7.45	0.4	4.19	1.1	11.64
15	"Vested Interests"	March 6, 2020	0.6	7.31	0.5	4.44	1.1	11.75
16	"The First 100 Days"	March 13, 2020	0.7	8.14	0.5	4.23	1.2	12.37
17	"The Puzzle Palace"	April 3, 2020	0.7	8.77	0.5	4.28	1.2	13.05
18	"Hide in Plain Sight"	April 24, 2020	0.8	8.02	0.44	4.20	1.2	12.22
19	"Family Secrets"	May 1, 2020	0.7	8.52	0.46	4.12	1.15	12.65
