= Blue Bloods season 11 =

Season of television series

Blue Bloods
- Season 11
- No. of episodes: 16

Release
- Original network: CBS
- Original release: December 4, 2020 – May 14, 2021

Season chronology
- ← Previous; Season 10 Next → Season 12

The eleventh season of Blue Bloods, a police procedural drama series created by Robin Green and Mitchell Burgess, premiered on CBS December 4, 2020. Due to production schedules being shortened by the COVID-19 pandemic, the season is reduced to 16 episodes, with the two hour season finale having aired May 14.

On April 15, 2021, CBS renewed Blue Bloods for a twelfth season.

== Cast ==
Donnie Wahlberg (Danny Reagan), Bridget Moynahan (Erin Reagan), Will Estes (Jamie Reagan), and Len Cariou (Henry Reagan) are first credited. Tom Selleck (Frank Reagan) receives an "and" billing at the close of the main title sequence. This marks the first time since season 4 that Sami Gayle is not in the opening credits; she made one guest appearance in season 11.

Marisa Ramirez, as Danny's partner Detective Maria Baez, and Vanessa Ray, as Jamie's former partner (now wife) Eddie Janko-Reagan, continue to receive "also starring" billing for season 11. Gregory Jbara as Deputy Commissioner of Public Information Garrett Moore, Robert Clohessy as Lt. Sidney Gormley, Abigail Hawk as Detective Abigail Baker, Frank's primary aide, and Steve Schirripa as DA investigator Det. Anthony Abetemarco appear regularly and receive "special guest star" billing.

=== Main ===
- Tom Selleck as NYPD Police Commissioner Francis "Frank" Reagan
- Donnie Wahlberg as Detective 1st Grade Daniel "Danny" Reagan
- Bridget Moynahan as ADA Erin Reagan
- Will Estes as Sergeant Jameson "Jamie" Reagan
- Len Cariou as New York City Police Commissioner Henry Reagan (Retired)
- Marisa Ramirez as Detective 1st Grade Maria Baez
- Vanessa Ray as Officer Eddie Janko

=== Recurring ===
- Abigail Hawk as Detective 1st Grade Abigail Baker
- Gregory Jbara as Deputy Commissioner of Public Information Garrett Moore
- Robert Clohessy as Lieutenant Sidney "Sid" Gormley
- Steve Schirripa as DA Investigator Anthony Abetemarco
- Lauren Patten as Officer Rachel Witten
- Will Hochman as Detective 3rd Grade Joseph "Joe" Hill
- Rosyln Ruff as D.A. Kimberly "Kim" Crawford
- Peter Hermann as Jack Boyle
- Andrew Terraciano as Sean Reagan
- Callie Thorne as Maggie Gibson
- Stephanie Kurtzuba as Sergent Paula McNichols

=== Guest ===
- Sami Gayle as Nicole "Nicky" Reagan-Boyle
- Tony Terraciano as Jack Reagan
- Bonnie Somerville as Paula Hill
- Whoopi Goldberg as Regina Thomas
- Lyle Lovett as Texas Ranger Waylon Gates

== Episodes ==
| No. overall | No. in season | Title | Directed by | Written by | Original release date | Prod. code | U.S. viewers (millions) |
|---|---|---|---|---|---|---|---|
| 219 | 1 | "Triumph Over Trauma" | David Barrett | Siobhan Byrne O'Connor | December 4, 2020 | 1101 | 6.44 |
Frank and City Council Speaker Regina Thomas (Whoopi Goldberg) clash over recent protests against police brutality. Frank composes a resignation letter for the mayor and has Garrett read it aloud to him. Danny and Baez worryingly vanish during their pursuit of a dangerous killer. Anthony, Jamie, and Jamie's nephew Joe all join in the hunt to find the two. After the two are finally located, an injured Baez joins the Reagan Sunday dinner. Eddie helps a young woman whose father was misidentified among a number of Coronavirus victims, which inspires her to attend her father's parole hearing (after initially telling Jamie she did not wish to attend). Note: Dedicated to executive producer Leonard Goldberg.
| 220 | 2 | "In the Name of the Father" | John Behring | Brian Burns | December 11, 2020 | 1102 | 6.38 |
Danny and Baez work with Jamie to convict a notorious drug lord after a witness that was set to testify against him is killed. Danny is convinced the drug lord's defense attorney broke the law and shared the witness list with his client. After DA Charwell, Erin's boss, is arrested and dismissed for corruption, Erin nervously awaits the governor's selection for the new district attorney. Meanwhile, Detective Joe Hill thwarts a kidnapping while off-duty and it is caught on camera, leading to Garrett wanting to make him the face of the NYPD. This forces Frank, Joe and Joe's mother Paula to face a difficult decision about revealing Joe's family ties. When Joe and Paula join the Reagan Sunday dinner, Frank learns that someone dug up Joe's birth certificate.
| 221 | 3 | "Atonement" | David Barrett | Kevin Riley | December 18, 2020 | 1103 | 6.38 |
After Joe Hill is revealed to be related to the Reagan family, he has a tough time with other cops in his squad, culminating in a fistfight at his precinct. He later admits to Frank he has applied for a leave; he affirms he'll try to attend Sunday dinner to meet Nicky and Jack, who are visiting for Christmas, but he doesn't show up. Meanwhile, Danny is visited by a young woman who shows him a video of her grandfather being pushed down a flight of stairs. She initially spoke to Jamie on the matter, but he brushed it off because the woman claimed God told her that her grandfather was murdered. Danny updates Jamie on the matter and discreetly works the case with him as Jamie reports himself to IAB. The young woman's brother is responsible, having committed the act as a gang initiation, and Jamie ultimately talks him off a ledge. Also, Erin and Anthony receive gift-wrapped evidence from gangster Donnie Hassett (Mark Deklin) regarding a mob case, but it turns out to be a setup. Note: Dedicated to recurring guest star Nick Cordero.
| 222 | 4 | "Redemption" | Alex Chapple | Ian Biederman | January 8, 2021 | 1104 | 6.56 |
Officer Ray Flores is wracked with guilt over his partner being shot while the two accosted a robbery suspect, and later says to Jamie that he wants to kill the suspect. When the suspect ends up shot in the head, Flores is investigated by IAB, but Jamie isn't convinced that his officer acted on his claim. Erin faces a dilemma when a man convicted of vehicular homicide in a drunk driving incident protects some children in a heroic act while out on bail. She consults the victim's mother to make a case that the convicted man should get a lighter sentence. Elsewhere, Frank is conflicted when Detective Allison Mulaney (Ali Stroker) wants to continue actively working cases despite being unable to walk after being injured on the job.
| 223 | 5 | "Spilling Secrets" | John Behring | Daniel Truly | January 22, 2021 | 1105 | 6.73 |
Eddie and Rachel (Lauren Patten) are heralded for their bravery for stopping an active shooter until a civilian comes forward to accuse them of faking the incident as part of a government conspiracy. Meanwhile, Frank pries into a decades-long history of cash payments his father Henry has been making to an unknown recipient. Also, Danny and Baez investigate a man's murder and find the man's two sons each accusing the other of the crime. Elsewhere, Sean's high school locker is vandalized with anti-police graffiti.
| 224 | 6 | "The New Normal" | David Barrett | Ian Biederman | February 5, 2021 | 1106 | 6.51 |
Frank deals with a police captain in The Bronx whose precinct is seeing growing crime and fewer arrests. Meanwhile, Danny faces backlash from Baez and Internal Affairs over a tough call he made in the field. Also, Jamie assigns Eddie and Rachel a social worker to ride along with them as part of a pilot program, and Eddie is surprised at the worker's effectiveness on their first domestic call. Elsewhere, Erin opposes a criminal being released due to new bail laws, and crosses her new boss with the way she handles things after the man is back on the street.
| 225 | 7 | "In Too Deep" | Jennifer Opresnick | Daniel Truly | February 12, 2021 | 1107 | 6.52 |
After Danny’s neighbor is injured in a drive-by shooting, he and the investigating detective are at odds over their differing methods. Meanwhile, a friend of Jamie’s from high school, who is now a true-crime blogger, comes to him with evidence on a cold case. Skeptical, Jamie brings it to Erin and Anthony’s attention, and they work together to determine the culprit. Elsewhere, Douglas McKenzie (Mike Carlsen), a detective who resigned a year prior, reveals information about a suspected crime ring to Frank. Despite Garrett and Gormley's apprehension in trusting McKenzie, Frank ultimately asks McKenzie to rejoin the force.
| 226 | 8 | "More Than Meets the Eye" | David Barrett | Siobhan Byrne O'Connor & Yasmin Cadet | March 5, 2021 | 1108 | 6.30 |
Another victim of the serial killer, who previously held Danny and Baez hostage, is found. With the location of the body in dispute, Danny agrees to work the case in conjunction with a Nassau County detective, which initially angers Maria. Jamie arrests an intrusive reporter who appears at a series of store lootings. The new District Attorney shadows Erin as they try to convince a scared eyewitness to reveal the identity of the person who shot her boyfriend. Erin realizes that she and her boss have very different methods. Meanwhile, Frank gets involved when Attorney General Robert Lewis (Michael Imperioli) asks him to get the charges against the reporter dropped.
| 227 | 9 | "For Whom the Bell Tolls" | Robert Harmon | Brian Burns | March 26, 2021 | 1109 | 6.39 |
A man with whom Baez was briefly romantically involved is found murdered on her front lawn. Unbeknownst to Baez, the man had a fiancé; her alibi is solid, but a camera app Baez installed on her front door shows that the fiancé is responsible. Danny ultimately makes it in time to stop the woman from killing Baez as well. An officer at Jamie's precinct is given a rip for arriving to work late three times in one week, though it is due to his pregnant wife's morning sickness. While Eddie is upset at Jamie's handling of the situation, their captain sides with Jamie on the matter. Erin is frustrated upon receiving prosecution case notes from her boss and barges into her boss's office to complain. Elsewhere, Frank calls Dr. Alex Dawson, the therapist who previously helped Danny, to meet with his team when Gormley is shown to be highly stressed. It is later revealed that Gormley's longtime partner had died suddenly and unexpectedly. Frank himself admits to the therapist he is struggling to "see past the scoreboard" of his own fallen friends and family members. At Sunday dinner, Sean opens a letter from his college of choice, and announces he was accepted.
| 228 | 10 | "The Common Good" | David Barrett | Kevin Riley | April 2, 2021 | 1110 | 6.21 |
Frank asks Erin to liaise between him and NY Governor Mendez regarding pension policy reform he privately backs, but can't publicly support because it would put him at odds with police rank and file. Meanwhile, Danny and Baez become enmeshed in the world of competitive gaming when a high-profile video game streamer is murdered. Elsewhere, Eddie and Witten suspect a live-in nanny is being abused after she approaches them on the street for help. Also, Jamie mentors a street kid until three gang members label and assault him for being a snitch.
| 229 | 11 | "Guardian Angels" | Ralph Hemecker | Ian Biederman & Jack Ciapciak | April 9, 2021 | 1111 | 6.35 |
Frank takes matters into his own hands to save Gormley's career when decades-old excessive force complaints against him become public knowledge. Meanwhile, Danny and Baez learn to be allies to the transgender community when a transgender woman is found murdered in a dumpster. Elsewhere, Eddie gets assaulted by a man who hates cops and was just released on bail for a similar assault. Jamie investigates the incident and has a plan to get back at the culprit. Also, Erin and Anthony watch a video of a vigilante beating up and nearly killing a robbery-assault suspect, with their views on the matter putting them at odds with both the DA and the governor.
| 230 | 12 | "Happy Endings" | Eric Laneuville | Siobhan Byrne O'Connor | April 16, 2021 | 1112 | 6.83 |
Business becomes personal for Frank and his Police Plaza team when Baker is assaulted on the street. The incident inspires Baker to seriously consider returning to field work. Meanwhile, Erin asks her ex-husband Jack Boyle to represent a defendant she's prosecuting in a gun possession case; Jack bets that he will get to take Erin on a romantic weekend if his client is innocent, but Erin counters by saying Jack must attend Sunday dinner if the defendant is guilty. It turns out the gun was used in an attempted murder of a couple that Danny and Baez are investigating, with the friend of Erin's suspect pulling the trigger. Elsewhere, Eddie wonders if she is being too stubborn after she publicly undermines Jamie's decision to assign her and Witten's collar to an anti-crime unit. Jack joins the family for Sunday dinner despite winning his bet with Erin about his client being innocent.
| 231 | 13 | "Fallen Heroes" | David Barrett | Peter D'Antonio & Daniel Truly | April 30, 2021 | 1113 | 6.29 |
Jamie rides with a rookie in his squad who is shoved by a perp. Jamie recognizes the perp as a homeless veteran who saved Danny's life in Fallujah, and tells his rookie to cut her loose without explanation. Frank and Gormley question why Jamie keeps mum about the ordeal, and the argument between father and son continues into Sunday dinner. Danny reunites with his combat friend and convinces her to enter rehab after several unsuccessful tries by Jamie in the past. Meanwhile, Danny and Baez disagree while investigating the murder of a controversial comedy club owner when the lead suspect is Emmett Fells (Ben Bailey), one of Danny's favorite comedians whose alcoholism has led to troubled times. While Danny wants to look into other potential suspects, Baez believes Danny is too starstruck to accept that the evidence points toward Fells. Elsewhere, Eddie agrees to an undercover assignment with Anthony, but balks when she learns the informant is former corrupt parole officer Don Voorhees. Despite the lingering animosity between the two, Voorhees ultimately puts himself in harm's way to come to Eddie's aid when the suspect dumps her phone.
| 232 | 14 | "The New You" | Jackeline Tejada | Brian Burns | May 7, 2021 | 1114 | 5.87 |
A quote of Garrett's that appears to say the NYPD "can do better" is listed on the front page of a local paper. Garrett refuses to walk it back, leading to an argument with Frank. Meanwhile, a jogger discovers a dead homeless man in a park. Danny and Baez learn this is his third such discovery and grow suspicious, later finding he was a prominent presence in anti-homeless protests as a former politician. Reviewing the video footage again leads the detectives toward a homeless woman with mental health issues as being responsible. Anthony is mistaken for a mafioso at a bar when a man named Lenny (Louis Mustillo) asks him to kill his unfaithful wife for him. Lenny decides not to follow through with this plan, but Anthony later confronts the man who was having the affair. Elsewhere, Eddie tries to get Jamie to take a love language quiz against his will, ending in a lover's quarrel outside the interrogation room at the precinct.
| 233 | 15 | "The End" | Alex Zakrzewski | Siobhan Byrne O'Connor & Kevin Riley | May 14, 2021 | 1115 | 6.36 |
Shockwaves ripple through the Reagan family when Danny and Maria follow up on a tip about the sale of illegal guns, only to find recently discovered family member and NYPD detective Joe Hill (Will Hochman) making the purchase along with an accomplice. An angry Frank meets with ATF field agent Rachel Webber (Gloria Reuben), who was aware that Joe was working undercover for ATF, but did not inform the NYPD that Joe had returned to New York. Danny also learns that Jamie was aware of Joe's undercover status and is acting as a contact, but did not tell the rest of the Reagans. The episode ends with Danny and Jamie discovering a burned body in a car that had blown up, thought to be the one Joe was riding in.
| 234 | 16 | "Justifies the Means" | David Barrett | Teleplay by : Kevin Wade; Story by : Ian Biederman & Kevin Wade | May 14, 2021 | 1116 | 7.07 |
The Reagans are relieved to learn that Joe was not in the car at the time of the explosion, but nonetheless realize his cover must have been blown. Danny and Jamie follow leads left by Joe to help bring down the gunrunning outfit. Joe and Ty (one of the group's lower-level members who later joins Joe's side) send Danny and Jamie up to New England, culminating in the four of them finding a large stash of weapons at a New Hampshire farm. The gunrunning group tails them to this location and a shootout ensues; most of the criminals are killed, Ty sacrifices his life to save Joe's, and the gunrunning leader escapes. Joe then joins the Reagans for Sunday dinner.

== Ratings ==
Viewership and ratings per episode of Blue Bloods season 11
| No. | Title | Air date | Rating (18–49) | Viewers (millions) | DVR (18–49) | DVR viewers (millions) | Total (18–49) | Total viewers (millions) |
|---|---|---|---|---|---|---|---|---|
| 1 | "Triumph Over Trauma" | December 4, 2020 | 0.5 | 6.44 | 0.4 | 3.61 | 0.9 | 10.05 |
| 2 | "In the Name of the Father" | December 11, 2020 | 0.5 | 6.38 | 0.4 | 3.77 | 0.9 | 10.15 |
| 3 | "Atonement" | December 18, 2020 | 0.5 | 6.38 | —N/a | —N/a | —N/a | —N/a |
| 4 | "Redemption" | January 8, 2021 | 0.6 | 6.56 | 0.4 | 3.56 | 1.0 | 10.13 |
| 5 | "Spilling Secrets" | January 22, 2021 | 0.6 | 6.73 | —N/a | —N/a | —N/a | —N/a |
| 6 | "The New Normal" | February 5, 2021 | 0.5 | 6.51 | —N/a | —N/a | —N/a | —N/a |
| 7 | "In Too Deep" | February 12, 2021 | 0.5 | 6.52 | —N/a | 3.70 | —N/a | 10.22 |
| 8 | "More Than Meets the Eye" | March 5, 2021 | 0.5 | 6.30 | —N/a | 3.79 | —N/a | 10.09 |
| 9 | "For Whom the Bell Tolls" | March 26, 2021 | 0.5 | 6.39 | —N/a | —N/a | —N/a | —N/a |
| 10 | "The Common Good" | April 2, 2021 | 0.7 | 6.21 | —N/a | —N/a | —N/a | —N/a |
| 11 | "Guardian Angels" | April 9, 2021 | 0.5 | 6.35 | —N/a | 3.78 | —N/a | 10.13 |
| 12 | "Happy Endings" | April 16, 2021 | 0.6 | 6.83 | —N/a | 3.69 | —N/a | 10.52 |
| 13 | "Fallen Heroes" | April 30, 2021 | 0.5 | 6.29 | —N/a | 3.89 | —N/a | 10.18 |
| 14 | "The New You" | May 7, 2021 | 0.5 | 5.87 | 0.4 | 3.83 | 0.9 | 9.70 |
| 15 | "The End" | May 14, 2021 | 0.5 | 6.36 | 0.3 | 3.06 | 0.8 | 9.41 |
| 16 | "Justifies the Means" | May 14, 2021 | 0.6 | 7.07 | 0.3 | 3.14 | 0.9 | 10.21 |
