= Jacob Latimore =

American singer-songwriter and actor (born 1996)

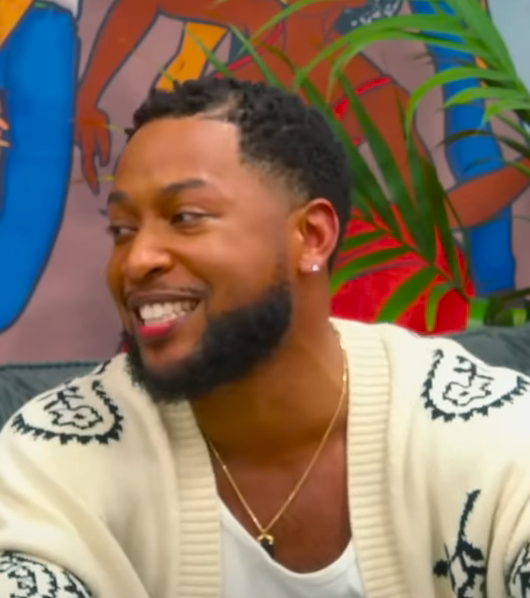
- Latimore in 2023

Background information
- Born: Jacob O'Neal Latimore Jr, August 10, 1996 (age 30); Milwaukee, Wisconsin, U.S.
- Genres: R&B, pop, hip hop
- Occupations: Actor; singer-songwriter
- Instrument: Vocals
- Years active: 2005–present
- Labels: FTE; Jacob's Ink; EMPIRE; Crown World; RCA

Jacob O'Neal Latimore Jr. (born August 10, 1996) is an American actor, singer and dancer from Milwaukee, Wisconsin. As a singer, Latimore has self-released four studio albums, Connection (2016), Connection2 (2019), C3 (2020), and JL (2025). As an actor, he is best known for his roles in Black Nativity, The Maze Runner, Collateral Beauty, Detroit, and The Chi. He also starred in the Netflix Original movie Candy Jar alongside Sami Gayle.

== Life and career ==
Latimore was born in Milwaukee, Wisconsin, the son of Latitia Taylor and Jacob Latimore Sr.

=== Film ===
Latimore has co-starred in several major films, including Black Nativity (2013), as Langston, and Ride Along (2014), as Ramon. He also appeared in the movie The Maze Runner, which was released in theaters September 19, 2014. He then starred in the drama film Collateral Beauty, which was released on December 16, 2016, and street magic drama movie Sleight, which was released on April 28, 2017. Latimore is currently starring on Showtime's The Chi as Emmett. In 2019, Bilal: A New Breed of Hero was released in which Latimore acted as a voiceover. In 2020, he co-starred in the comedy Like a Boss. In 2021, he starred in Gully.

=== Music ===
Latimore's first single "Best Friend" was released in 2005. In 2006, "Superstar" was released. In June 2014, he released his hit song "Heartbreak Heard Around The World" ft. T-Pain. His debut album, Connection, was released in 2016. His second effort, Connection2, the sequel to Connection, was released on April 26, 2019.

== Filmography ==
=== Film ===
Year	Film	Role	Notes
2010	Vanishing on 7th Street	James Leary	
2013	Black Nativity	Langston	
2014	Ride Along	Ramon	
2014	The Maze Runner	Jeff	
2016	Bilal: A New Breed of Hero	Bilal (teen)	
2016	Collateral Beauty	Raffi / Time	
2017	Sleight	Bashir “Bo” Wolfe	
2017	Detroit	Fred Temple	
2017	Krystal	Bobby Bryant	
2018	Candy Jar	Bennett Russell	
2019	Gully	Calvin	
2019	The Last Summer	Alec	
2020	Like a Boss	Harry	
2022	Texas Chainsaw Massacre	Dante Spivey	
2023	House Party	Kevin	

=== Television ===
Year	Title	Role	Notes
2009	One Tree Hill	Kid No. 1	Episode: "Now You Lift Your Eyes to the Sun"
2011	Tyler Perry's House of Payne	Dante	Episode: "Growing Paynes"
2011	So Random!	Himself	
2011	Reed Between the Lines	Jacob	Episode: "Let's Talk About College Boys"
2012	The Finder	Young Trey	Episode: "Life After Death"
2014	Survivor's Remorse	Johnny Miller	Episode: "How to Build a Brand"
2018–2026	The Chi	Emmett Washington	Main
2020	Amazing Stories	Cody	Episode: "Signs of Life"

== Discography ==
=== Studio albums ===
Title	Album details	Peak chart positions	
Title	Album details	US Indie	US R&B
Connection	Released: December 9, 2016; Label: FTE, Jacob's Ink, EMPIRE; Format: CD, Digital download, streaming	42	36
Connection2	Released: April 26, 2019; Label: FTE, Jacob's Ink, EMPIRE; Format: Digital download, streaming	—	—
C3	Released: May 22, 2020; Label: FTE, Jacob's Ink, EMPIRE; Format: Digital download, streaming	—	—
JL	Released: May 2, 2025; Label: Jacob’s Ink, CWE DISTRO; Format: Digital download, streaming	—	—

=== Mixtapes and extended plays ===
- I Am the Future (2009)
- This is Me (2012)
- This is Me 2 (2013)
- Leo Season (2020)
