= Candy Jar =

2018 American romantic comedy film by Ben Shelton

- Directed by: Ben Shelton
- Written by: Chad Klitzman
- Produced by: Michael A. Simpson; Judy Cairo
- Starring: Sami Gayle; Jacob Latimore; Shell Galloway
- Cinematography: Topher Osborn
- Edited by: Kayla Emter
- Music by: Ryan Leach
- Production company: Netflix
- Distributed by: Netflix
- Release date: April 27, 2018 (United States)
- Running time: 92 minutes
- Country: United States
- Language: English

Candy Jar is a 2018 American romantic comedy film directed by Ben Shelton and starring Sami Gayle and Jacob Latimore. The screenplay concerns a dueling high school debate champion duo who are trying to get into the colleges of their dreams. The film was released on April 27, 2018 on Netflix.

== Plot ==
In the principal's office of Hemlock Prep Academy, Lona Skinner internally monologues about her hate towards Bennet Russell, her fellow and only other debate club member. They compete to be president of their two-person debate club as it would look good on their college applications; Lona - Harvard and Bennet - Yale. Ultimately, the principal declares them co-presidents, despite their protests.

At the debate tournament, Lona's mother, Amy, and Bennet's mother, Julia, are passive aggressive towards each other. Both Bennet and Lona make it to finals, and are declared co-champions as they are from the same school. The next day, they each send in their college applications.

Despite Lona's protests, Amy makes her dress for homecoming. Lona leaves the house, promising to go, but instead walks barefoot to the movies. She bumps into Bennet, who is also dressed for the dance. After the movie ends, Bennet offers Lona a ride home, but instead of taking her there, they get fast food and eat outside by the waterfront.

Their mothers are again hostile to each other next day at the regional qualifying tournament. Julia is meant to be a guest speaker, but Amy heckles her. Kathy, the school guidance counselor and their confidant, is told by both that their mothers are the reason neither qualified for the state championship. Kathy suggests maybe they just lost, but Bennet explains that the same happened in middle school twice. She tries to get them to work as a team to try and qualify in another round of state regionals, but neither wants to.

Bennet eventually tricks Lona into agreeing to team up, and they begin to study together. Together, they qualify for the state championship, but both worry about their college applications. Kathy makes them promise to have fun, no matter where they end up. The results come in later that night, and neither gets into their dream school. Julia tries to use her influence to get Bennet into Yale, only to infuriate Bennet.

The next day, both Lona and Bennet wait outside Kathy's office, but the principal approaches and informs them that Kathy died in a car crash. Bennet and Lona bond at Kathy's funeral, going out after for shakes and fries, where Bennet talks about how neither have ever really been high schoolers because they've been so busy with homework, tests, and debate.

Neither want to continue towards the state championship, but after talking with their debate coach Mr. Johnson, they agree to continue working together. Working cohesively, they begin to bond over Amy's cookies and become friends. Two days before the state tournament they kiss, then Lona pulls away. Meanwhile, Julia tries to make peace with Amy by asking for her cookie recipe. The next day, Lona skips school, so Bennet goes over later and tries to talk about the kiss only to be shut down by her, who explains she doesn't know how to handle it.

The following day at the state championship, they make it to the final, and compete against a team with an unconventional style of citing personal feelings over facts. Lona begins to stutter, but recovers after she seeing a note from Bennet, reminding her of Kathy. She and Bennet agree with the other team, losing the state championship but becoming a couple.

On prom night, Julia and Amy prepare their children for the prom. It is revealed that Lona was accepted into Yale, and Bennet to Harvard. They skip the dance and instead go to the movies, where again Lona internally monologues about how much she likes him.

== Cast ==
- Sami Gayle as Lona Skinner
- Jacob Latimore as Bennett Russell
- Christina Hendricks as Amy Skinner, Lona's mom who despises Julia.
- Uzo Aduba as Julia Russell, a successful state senator and Bennet's mom.
- Tom Bergeron as Principal Nelson
- Helen Hunt as Kathy, Lona and Bennett's school counselor and confidant
- Shell Galloway as Anton
- Paul Tigue as Mr. Johnson
- Austin Flynn as Twin Taylor
- Blake Flynn as Twin Tanner
- Evan Castelloe as Zack

== Production ==
The film was shot from March to April 2017 in locations such as Atlanta, Georgia as well as Newnan, Georgia. Screenwriter Chad Klitzman wrote the role of Lona specifically for his sister, Sami Gayle, to portray. Speaking of her brother and the role, Gayle said:

He saw the types of material that was coming in for me, the types of characters that I was being sought after to play, and he wanted me to be able to fulfill my dream of having a leading role in a film where it was about a driven, independent young woman who was looking for a kind of self-fulfillment that was independent of external things like a relationship. She's just a girl who is trying to be the best version of herself, and so he thought, Why not take this into our own hands? So when he wrote this character, not only was it fulfilling the dream role I wanted to play, but it was also—since he's my brother and we're very close and nobody really knows you better than your family—tailor-made for me to play to my strengths as an actor and to really allow them to shine.

== Reception ==
Glenn Kenny of The New York Times praised the film as "fleet, sweet and often genuinely funny." Kenny wrote Candy Jar "honors young people of intellectual achievement while also making sharp points about class and educational standards. The two young leads, Jacob Latimore and Sami Gayle, are deft at playing brainy, and Helen Hunt, Christina Hendricks and Uzo Aduba offer solid adult support; Ms. Hunt is particularly effective as a sympathetic guidance counselor."

Jeffrey Lyles of Lyles Movie FilesDirector gave praise, saying "Ben Shelton does a terrific job of making something so potentially routine and boring as debate clubs interesting. Shelton has a clear understanding of the genre and liberally tosses in some fun split screens, close-ups and dynamic presentations of the debates to make them more exciting." Joe Reid of Decider.com also gave a positive review, saying "between Hunt, Aduba, and Hendricks, the acting level for a movie of this caliber is uncommonly high. This is highly watchable movie that doesn't break any new ground but will, at worst, make you think of a good half-dozen other great movies like it."
