= The Familiar Stranger =

2001 American drama television film

- Genre: Drama
- Written by: Alan Hines
- Directed by: Alan Metzger
- Starring: Margaret Colin; Jay O. Sanders
- Music by: Craig Safan
- Country of origin: United States
- Original language: English

Production
- Producer: Terry Gould
- Cinematography: Rhett Morita
- Editor: Pamela Malouf
- Running time: 91 minutes
- Production companies: Andrea Baynes Productions; Hearst Entertainment

Original release
- Network: Lifetime
- Release: March 12, 2001

The Familiar Stranger is a 2001 American drama television film directed by Alan Metzger. It stars Margaret Colin and Jay O. Sanders.

== Plot ==
It is based on the true story of Patrick Welsh, happily married with 2 sons. But he has committed money fraud. Feeling the heat, he fakes his suicide and abandons his family. He is eventually found in Maine (Galveston, TX in real life).

== Cast ==
- Margaret Colin as Elizabeth 'Peach' Welsh
- Jay O. Sanders as Patrick Hennessy Welsh / Timothy Michael Kingsbury
- Will Estes as Ted Welsh
- Aaron Ashmore as Chris Welsh
- Michael Cera as Young Ted Welsh
- Erik Knudsen as Young Chris Welsh
