= Blue Bloods =

American police procedural drama television series (2010–2024)

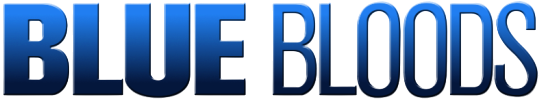
- Genre: Police procedural; Crime drama; Legal drama
- Created by: Robin Green; Mitchell Burgess
- Starring: Donnie Wahlberg; Bridget Moynahan; Will Estes; Len Cariou; Tom Selleck; Sami Gayle; Amy Carlson
- Opening theme: "Reagan's Theme" by Rob Simonsen
- Composer: Mark Snow
- Country of origin: United States
- Original language: English
- No. of seasons: 14
- No. of episodes: 293 (list of episodes)

Production
- Executive producers: Leonard Goldberg (2010–2020); Brian Burns; Mitchell Burgess; Robin Green; Siobhan Byrne O'Connor; Ian Biederman; Kevin Wade; Dan Truly; Tom Selleck
- Producers: Fred Keller; David Barrett (2024)
- Production locations: New York, New York, U.S.
- Cinematography: Craig Dibona, ASC; Donald E. Thorin Jr.; Gene Engels
- Editors: Charles McClelland; Brice Bishop-Pullan; Thomas R. Moore; Jackeline Tejada
- Camera setup: Single-camera
- Running time: 40–44 minutes
- Production companies: Panda Productions (2010–2020); The Leonard Goldberg Company (2020–2024); Paw in Your Face Productions (2010–2011); CBS Productions (2010–2012); CBS Television Studios (2012–2020); CBS Studios (2020–2024)

Original release
- Network: CBS
- Release: September 24, 2010 – December 13, 2024

Related
- Boston Blue

Blue Bloods is an American police procedural drama television series that aired on CBS from September 24, 2010, to December 13, 2024, across 14 seasons and 293 episodes. Its main characters are the fictional Reagan family, an Irish-American Catholic family in New York City with a history of work in law enforcement. Blue Bloods stars Tom Selleck as New York City Police Commissioner Frank Reagan; other main cast members include Donnie Wahlberg, Bridget Moynahan, Will Estes and Len Cariou for all 14 seasons, plus Amy Carlson (seasons 1–7), Sami Gayle (seasons 1–10), as well as Marisa Ramirez (regular since season 4) and Vanessa Ray (regular since season 5).

The show was filmed on location in New York City. The series debuted on September 24, 2010, with episodes airing on Fridays following CSI: NY before being moved to Wednesdays at 10:00 pm ET/PT for a four-week tryout. After four weeks, it returned to its original Friday 10:00 pm slot, where it remained until its cancellation in 2024.

On March 29, 2023, CBS announced the show had been renewed for a 14th season, with the cast and producers reportedly taking a pay cut to secure the renewal. On July 21, 2023, CBS announced the renewed 14th season would be delayed and on hold due to the 2023 SAG-AFTRA strike, and on November 20, 2023, that it would be the show's last. The first ten episodes of the season began airing on February 16, 2024, while the rest of the season, consisting of eight episodes, premiered on October 18, 2024. The series finale aired on December 13, 2024.

CBS subsequently announced in February 2025 that it had ordered the spin-off series Boston Blue, which is executive produced by Wahlberg and focuses on his character of Danny Reagan. It premiered in October 2025, succeeding Blue Bloods in its former Friday-night time slot.

== Premise ==
The series follows the Reagan family, which has a long history of policing in New York. Frank Reagan (Tom Selleck) is the New York Police Department Police Commissioner, a post his father Henry also held. Frank's eldest surviving son, Danny (Donnie Wahlberg), is an NYPD detective and his youngest son, Jamie (Will Estes), is an NYPD sergeant who graduated from Harvard University; his daughter, Erin (Bridget Moynahan), works as a New York city assistant district attorney. Frank's late eldest son, Joe (the series refers to him as the eldest in later episodes), was murdered by a corrupt cop in the line of duty in events that predate the series, when he was involved with an FBI investigation of a group of corrupt NYPD cops known as the Blue Templar. Frank's father, Henry (Len Cariou), is a former NYPD beat cop who rose through the ranks to become police commissioner.

Each member of the family represents a different aspect of police work or the legal process: Frank as the commissioner, Danny as the detective, Jamie as the beat cop, and Erin as the prosecutor. Additionally, while each person's story might occasionally interweave with another's, the show also follows the professional and, at times, personal relationships with their respective partners and colleagues: Frank with Garrett Moore (Gregory Jbara), the NYPD Deputy Commissioner of Public Information and de facto Chief of Staff, Detective 1st Grade Abigail Baker (Abigail Hawk), the primary aide to the commissioner, and later, Lieutenant Sidney Gormley (Robert Clohessy), the Special Assistant to the Commissioner and de facto Chief of department; Danny with Detective Jackie Curatola (Jennifer Esposito) and later, Detective Maria Baez (Marisa Ramirez) at the 54th Precinct; Jamie with Officer Edit "Eddie" Janko (Vanessa Ray) at the 12th and later the 29th Precinct; and Erin with Detective Anthony Abetemarco (Steven Schirripa), who is an investigator for the DA's office.

The Reagans are an Irish-American Catholic family who gathers for Sunday dinner each week. According to People, "the Sunday supper is the heart of each show."

Both Henry's and Frank's respective wives, Betty and Mary, are deceased, as is Frank's firstborn son, Joe. Erin is divorced and has one daughter, college graduate Nicky (Sami Gayle), who lived with her mother until accepting a job in San Francisco in season 10. Danny is a widower with two sons, Jack and Sean (Tony and Andrew Terraciano). He was married to Linda (Amy Carlson), a nurse who was killed off-screen in a helicopter crash between seasons 7 and 8. Jamie married his partner, Edit "Eddie" Janko, in the season 9 finale. They acknowledged their mutual attraction during season 7 and became engaged at the end of season 8.

The season 10 finale reveals a son of Joe's, a fact unknown to himself and the family until the revelation. He's a 24-year-old detective in the firearms unit named Joe Hill (played by Will Hochman).

Guests at the family dinner outside of the core family members have included Frank's former partner Lenny Ross (Treat Williams), Frank's DCPI Garrett Moore, Frank's friend Archbishop Kevin Kearns (Stacy Keach), Danny's partner Maria Baez, Erin's ex-husband Jack Boyle (Peter Hermann) and her investigator partner Anthony Abetemarco, and Joe Hill with his mother Paula Hill (Bonnie Somerville).

== Cast and characters ==
Actor	Character	Seasons													
Actor	Character	1	2	3	4	5	6	7	8	9	10	11	12	13	14
Donnie Wahlberg	Detective Danny Reagan	Main	Main	Main	Main	Main	Main	Main	Main	Main	Main	Main	Main	Main	Main
Bridget Moynahan	ADA Erin Reagan	Main	Main	Main	Main	Main	Main	Main	Main	Main	Main	Main	Main	Main	Main
Will Estes	Officer/Sergeant Jamie Reagan	Main	Main	Main	Main	Main	Main	Main	Main	Main	Main	Main	Main	Main	Main
Len Cariou	Commissioner (ret.) Henry Reagan	Main	Main	Main	Main	Main	Main	Main	Main	Main	Main	Main	Main	Main	Main
Tom Selleck	Commissioner Frank Reagan	Main	Main	Main	Main	Main	Main	Main	Main	Main	Main	Main	Main	Main	Main
Jennifer Esposito	Detective Jackie Curatola	Also starring	Also starring	Also starring										Guest	Guest
Amy Carlson	Linda Reagan	R.	Also starring	Also starring	Also starring	Main	Main	Main							
Sami Gayle	Nicky Reagan-Boyle	R.	Also starring	Also starring	Also starring	Main	Main	Main	Main	Main	Main	G.		Guest	Guest
Marisa Ramirez	Detective Maria Baez			R.	Also starring	Also starring	Also starring	Also starring	Also starring	Also starring	Also starring	Also starring	Also starring	Also starring	Also starring
Vanessa Ray	Officer Eddie Janko-Reagan				R.	Also starring	Also starring	Also starring	Also starring	Also starring	Also starring	Also starring	Also starring	Also starring	Also starring

== Episodes ==
Season	Episodes		Originally released		Rank	Avg. viewership (in millions)
Season	Episodes		First released	Last released	Rank	Avg. viewership (in millions)
1	22		September 24, 2010	May 13, 2011	19	12.58
2	22		September 23, 2011	May 11, 2012	22	12.15
3	23		September 28, 2012	May 10, 2013	14	13.16
4	22		September 27, 2013	May 9, 2014	10	13.63
5	22		September 26, 2014	May 1, 2015	13	13.77
6	22		September 25, 2015	May 6, 2016	10	13.07
7	22		September 23, 2016	May 5, 2017	8	14.07
8	22		September 29, 2017	May 11, 2018	12	13.09
9	22		September 28, 2018	May 10, 2019	8	12.83
10	19		September 27, 2019	May 1, 2020	7	11.96
11	16		December 4, 2020	May 14, 2021	8	10.16
12	20		October 1, 2021	May 6, 2022	6	9.78
13	21		October 7, 2022	May 19, 2023	5	9.40
14	18	10	February 16, 2024	May 17, 2024	TBA	TBA
14	18	8	October 18, 2024	December 13, 2024	TBA	TBA

== Production ==
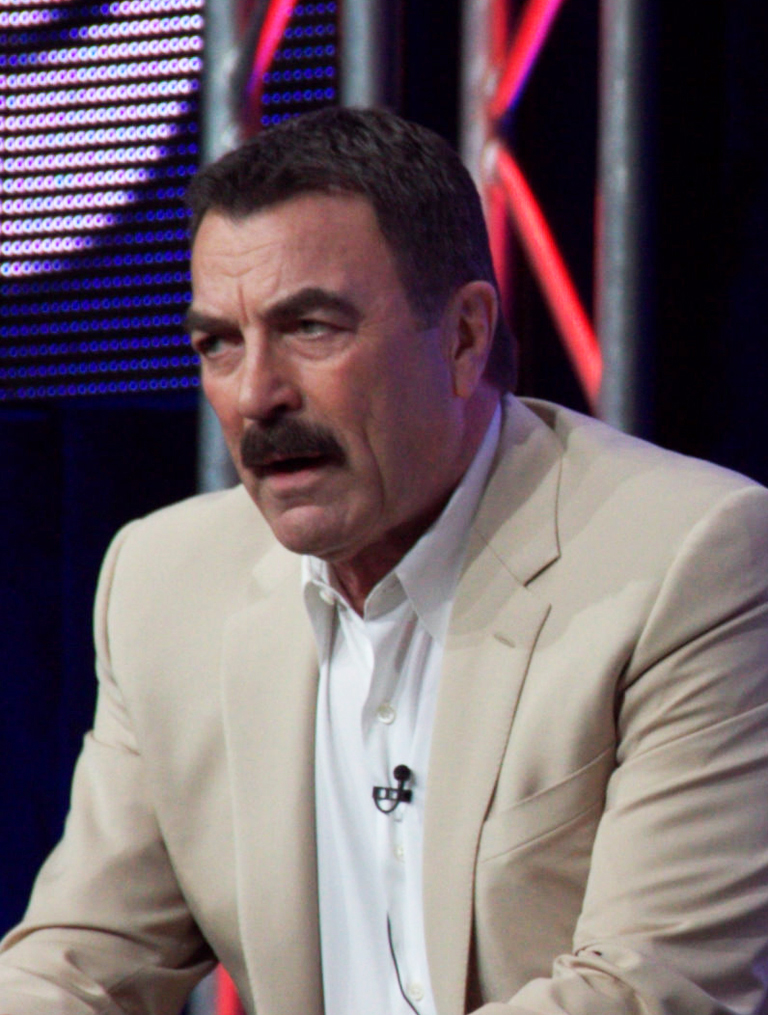
Tom Selleck, 2010

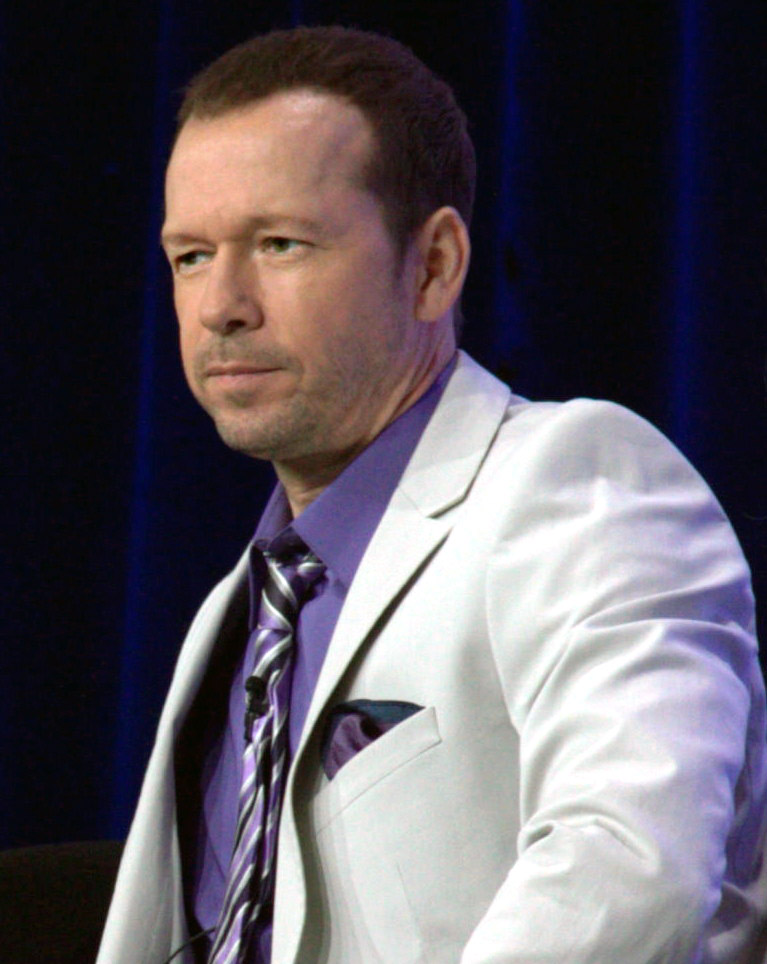
Donnie Wahlberg, 2010

Selleck mentioned that he was drawn to the project because of the strong pilot script and that he was concerned about becoming involved in an ongoing series because he did not want to compromise his commitment to the Jesse Stone television movies. Beginning January 19, 2011, Blue Bloods was moved to Wednesdays at 10 pm for a four-week tryout. In February 2011, the series returned to its Friday night time slot due to the series premiere of Criminal Minds: Suspect Behavior. In the UK, the show helped launch the Sky Atlantic channel by premiering on Tuesday, February 1, 2011, at 10:30 pm. In Australia, the show premiered in February 2011 in a primetime Wednesday slot on Network 10, then from February 2013 for season two was moved from the network's primary SD channel to its HD channel One alongside White Collar, then on August 26, 2013, the show moved back to the primary SD channel on Mondays for season three. In New Zealand, the show premieres on July 13, 2013, on TV3 replacing CSI: NY in a primetime Saturday slot after Law & Order: Special Victims Unit.

On October 20, 2012, CBS announced that Jennifer Esposito was being dropped from the series, with her character, Detective Curatola, being placed on indefinite leave of absence. Curatola's last appearance was in the season-three episode "Nightmares". Esposito and CBS had been at odds over her limited availability for work after the actress was diagnosed with celiac disease. She had missed a week after collapsing on set earlier in the season. In a press release from CBS, the network said that Esposito had "informed us that she is only available to work on a very limited, part-time schedule. As a result, she's unable to perform the demands of her role and we regretfully had to put her character on a leave of absence." According to Esposito, CBS challenged her request for a reduced work schedule, and further, kept her from finding work elsewhere.

On November 20, 2023, CBS announced that the 14th season would be the last, with the first 10 episodes premiering February 16, 2024, and the remaining eight in the fall of 2024, with producers including Selleck having pushed the network for the extension beyond the spring for the additional episodes in the fall. The second half of the final season premiered on October 18, 2024, and the series finale aired on December 13, 2024.

=== Filming ===
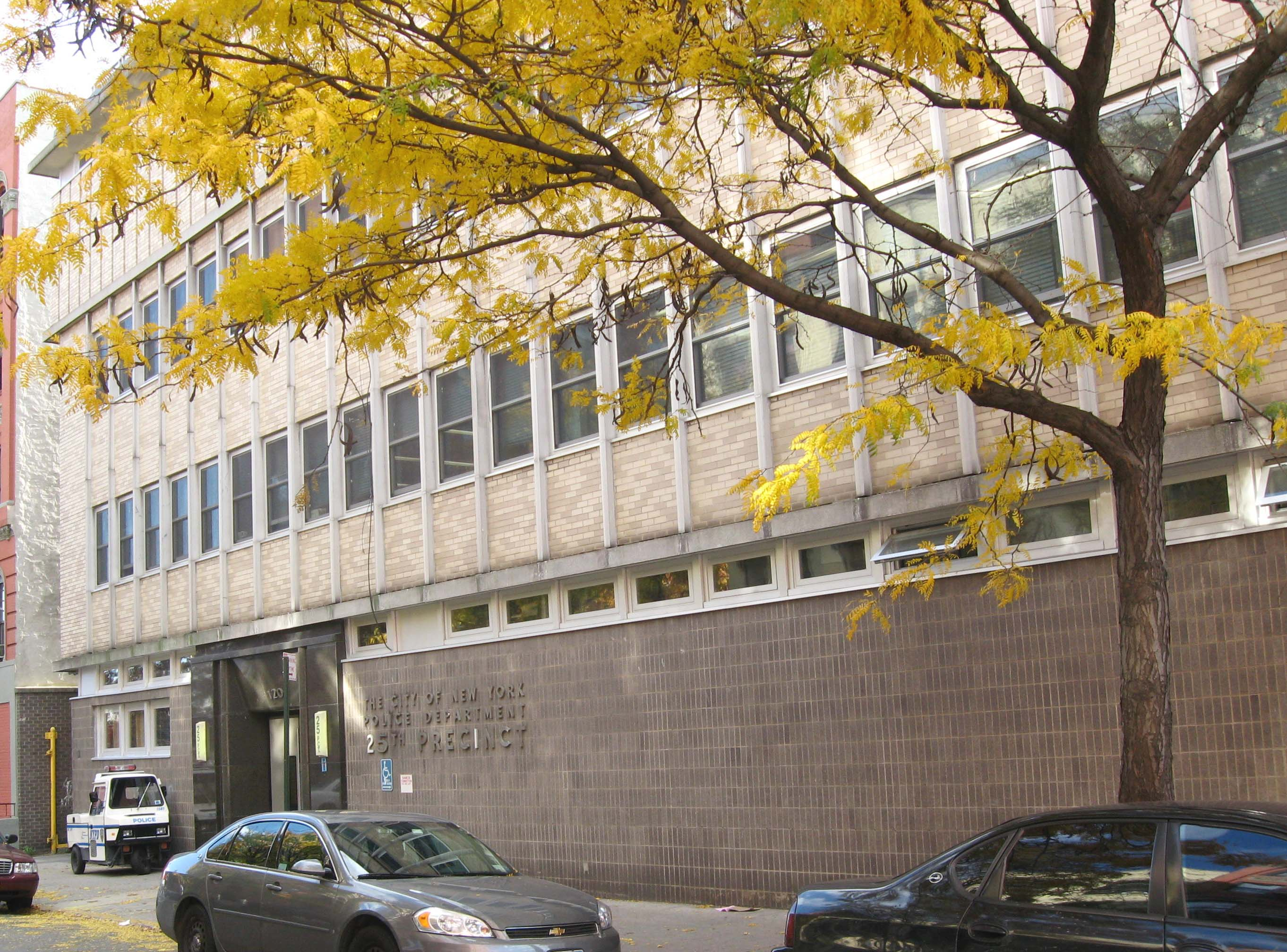

A house in Bay Ridge, Brooklyn, is used for exterior shots of the Reagan home, with interior scenes filmed at soundstages in Greenpoint, Brooklyn. In the initial episodes of the first season, Danny's precinct was identified as the 12th Precinct on screen, the same as the first precinct Jamie Reagan was assigned to, which is later identified as a different building. The building then has no precinct identification for several seasons, and is first referred to as the 54th Precinct in dialogue at the end of season three, before being identified as such on screen at the start of the fifth season.

== Release ==
=== International broadcast ===
In Australia, the show premiered in February 2011 in a primetime Wednesday slot on Network 10. Due to poor ratings of the first season, Network 10 moved the series to its secondary HD channel One alongside White Collar, where it premiered the second season on October 31, 2011. Due to decreased viewership of Ten's primary channel, season three moved back to the primary SD channel from August 26, 2013, and season four returned on March 17, 2014. In New Zealand, the show premiered on July 13, 2013, on TV3, replacing CSI: NY in a primetime Saturday slot after Law & Order: Special Victims Unit.

In Canada, new episodes air on CTV and are available for free for one week after the original air date on the CTV app.

In the United Kingdom, the show helped launch Sky Atlantic by premiering on Tuesday, February 1, 2011, at 10:30 pm, with season two returning on October 4, 2011, season three on December 13, 2012, and season four on November 28, 2013. Season five premiered on January 21, 2015. From season 9, new episodes of Blue Bloods moved to Sky Witness and have aired weekly and have been available on demand for some periods of time. It is also available on Paramount+ in the UK up to season 11. In Ireland, all series have been shown on RTÉ, which is the national broadcaster for the Republic of Ireland.

The series has also been broadcast throughout the Arabic-speaking market through MBC Action.

=== Reruns and home media ===
Every episode is available to stream on Paramount+ in the United States, while seasons one through 9 are also available on Hulu.

Reruns of Blue Bloods through season 14 air nationally in the United States on Wednesdays on Ion Television, although it was briefly removed from the schedule in early 2020. NewsNation previously aired the show daily with a marathon of episodes beginning July 4, 2022, after the show had aired on predecessor channel WGN America. Up TV began airing the program up to Season 7 with episodes every weeknight. Blue Bloods has also re-aired on Sundance TV and We TV beginning with Season 8. CBS Media Ventures currently distributes the series to local outlets on weekends, with two episodes being offered. Free streaming service Pluto TV launched a Blue Bloods channel in the U.S. in 2023.

Seasons one through 14 have had DVD releases that include special features, with seasons two through six also including audio commentaries on selected episodes.

In April 2025, a bundle of the complete series was among the top-10 digital titles in terms of revenue through Fandango at Home. In the U.K., the final season was among the top ten DVDs sold in March 2025.

== Reception ==
=== Critical response ===
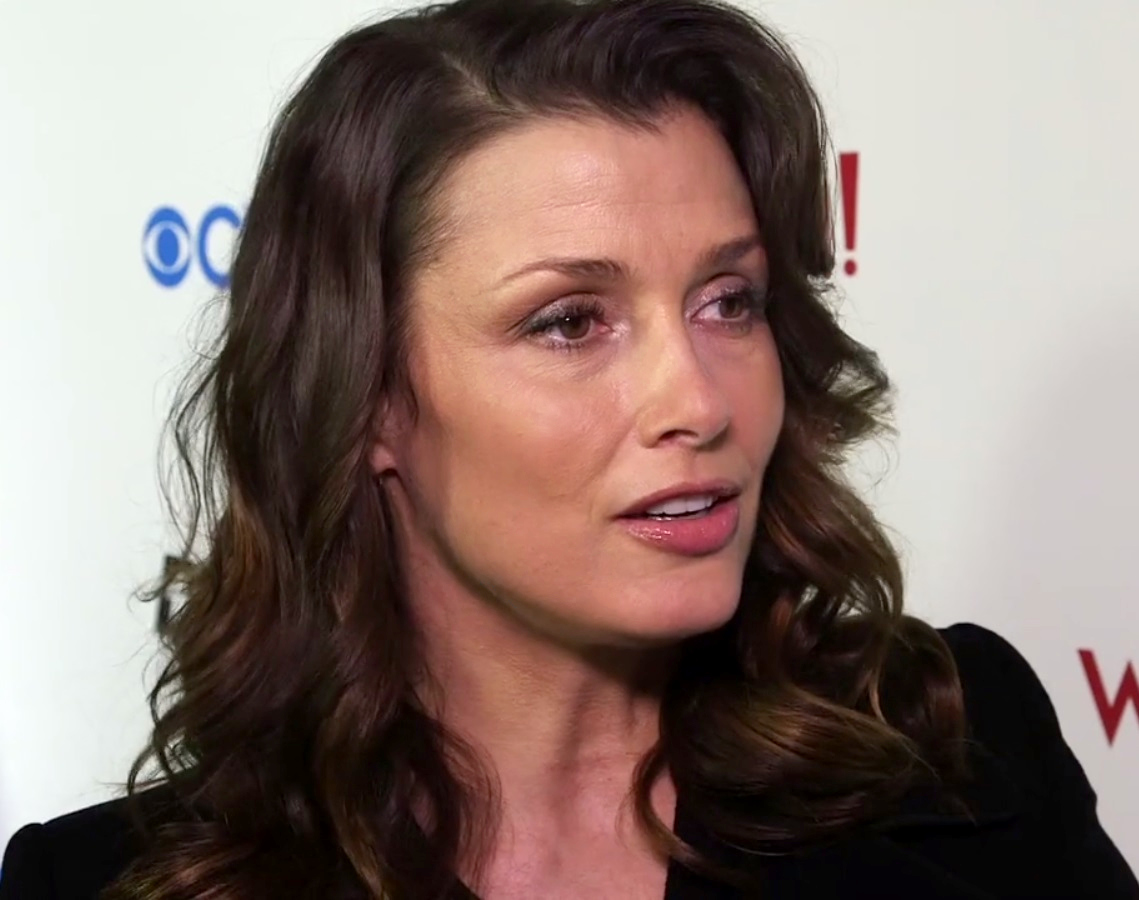
Bridget Moynahan, 2013

For the first season, the review aggregator website Rotten Tomatoes reported an 84% approval rating, with an average rating of 7.3/10 and based on 31 reviews. The website's consensus reads: "Blue Bloods features charismatic performances from Donnie Wahlberg and Tom Selleck, intriguing plotlines, and compelling doses of family drama within its police procedural trappings." Metacritic, which uses a weighted average, assigned a score of 70 out of 100 based on 25 critics, indicating "generally favorable reviews".

Reviewers have praised the series' on-location shooting. The New York Daily News praised Selleck's performance as Frank Reagan, while also praising the family dinner scenes for discussion of morally complex issues.

The Daily News drew comparisons between Selleck's characters Jesse Stone and Frank Reagan, saying that both Reagan and Stone are moral, principled men of few words. In Entertainment Weekly's annual Fall TV Preview, Ken Tucker named Blue Bloods one of the "Five Best New Shows" of 2010.

In late 2014, Slate's Laura Hudson criticized the show for downplaying or apologizing for systemic racism in law enforcement. Similarly, in a 2022 episode of Last Week Tonight, John Oliver compared the show to an "adult Paw Patrol" and criticized it for perpetuating the myth that police officers could overdose on fentanyl after merely touching it, using clips from a 2017 episode of the show. Jack Ori wrote for TVFanatic that calling the show "copaganda" was unfair, arguing that it made an effort to showcase multiple points of view to prompt discussion and featured both negative and positive portrayals of police.

As part of its Performer of the Week series, TVLine praised Donnie Wahlberg's performance in the premiere of season eight, the performances of Tom Selleck and Will Hochman in the season 13 episode "Nothing Sacred", and Marisa Ramirez's performance in the season-11 premiere.

Newsday highlighted the final season as part of its look at the best TV shows of 2024.

=== Ratings ===
The pilot episode garnered 15.258 million viewers because of the Live + 7 days after with viewings from DVRs. Without the DVR adding to the live viewing, the show's debut episode garnered a total of 13.02 million viewers.

Overall, the ratings have been steady for the series, after the pilot episode. The lowest viewer total through the first seven seasons was 8.88 million in episode eight of season seven (which ran against game three of the 2016 World Series); it was one of the few episodes through the first seven seasons that had fewer than 9 million initial-broadcast viewers. The second-season finale on May 11, 2012, was watched by 10.73 million viewers and received a 1.2/4 ratings/share among adults ages 18–49. The highest (non-pilot) live viewership of 12.93 million occurred in episode 14 of season four ("Manhattan Queens"), which was the series' 81st episode.

In January 2013, CBS announced via press release that Blue Bloods was the first scripted Friday series in 10 years to average at least 13 million viewers (live + 7), gaining eight percent more viewers than the previous year. The second season of CSI in 2001 had 14.78 million viewers, while the fourth season of Law & Order: SVU in 2003 had 14.92 million.

From season eight onward, ratings declined. Season nine was the first season with no episodes reaching 10 million first-run viewers, although Blue Bloods still ranked as the eighth-most watched program in 2018–19 Live + 7 viewership. Season nine also had the lowest first-run viewership for any episode to date (7.62 million for episode 14, "My Brother's Keeper").

Viewership and ratings per season of Blue Bloods
Season	Timeslot (ET)	Episodes	First aired		Last aired		TV season	Viewership rank	Avg. viewers (millions)
Season	Timeslot (ET)	Episodes	Date	Viewers (millions)	Date	Viewers (millions)	TV season	Viewership rank	Avg. viewers (millions)
1	Friday 10:00 p.m. (1–10, 15–22); Wednesday 10:00 p.m. (11–14)	22	September 24, 2010	13.01	May 13, 2011	11.79	2010–11	19	12.58
2	Friday 10:00 p.m.	22	September 23, 2011	12.06	May 11, 2012	10.73	2011–12	22	12.15
3	Friday 10:00 p.m.	23	September 28, 2012	11.22	May 10, 2013	10.30	2012–13	14	13.16
4	Friday 10:00 p.m.	22	September 27, 2013	11.70	May 9, 2014	11.78	2013–14	10	13.63
5	Friday 10:00 p.m.	22	September 26, 2014	10.88	May 1, 2015	11.28	2014–15	13	13.77
6	Friday 10:00 p.m.	22	September 25, 2015	10.08	May 6, 2016	10.10	2015–16	10	13.07
7	Friday 10:00 p.m.	22	September 23, 2016	10.55	May 5, 2017	9.24	2016–17	8	14.07
8	Friday 10:00 p.m.	22	September 29, 2017	10.04	May 11, 2018	8.88	2017–18	12	13.09
9	Friday 10:00 p.m.	22	September 28, 2018	8.79	May 10, 2019	8.48	2018–19	8	12.83
10	Friday 10:00 p.m.	19	September 27, 2019	7.85	May 1, 2020	8.52	2019–20	7	11.96
11	Friday 10:00 p.m.	16	December 4, 2020	6.44	May 14, 2021	7.07	2020–21	8	10.16
12	Friday 10:00 p.m.	20	October 1, 2021	6.30	May 6, 2022	6.23	2021–22	6	9.78
13	Friday 10:00 p.m.	21	October 7, 2022	6.40	May 19, 2023	5.78	2022–23	5	9.40
14	Friday 10:00 p.m.	18	February 16, 2024	5.67	December 13, 2024	5.86	2023–24	TBD	TBD

=== Accolades ===
In 2012, producer Brian Burns was a finalist for the Humanitas Prize for the season-two episode "The Job". In 2021, the show was awarded the TV Faith and Freedom Award for season 10, episode 19, "Family Secrets" at the MovieGuide Awards. Writer producer Siobhan Byrne O'Connor was nominated for an Edgar Award in 2012 for the episode "Innocence", in 2015 for the episode "Unfinished Business" and in 2023 for the episode "The Reagan Way". Kevin Wade was nominated for an Edgar Award in 2019 for the episode "My Aim is True".

== Spin-off ==
On June 4, 2024, Paramount Global co-CEO Brian Robbins revealed plans for a "franchise extension" of Blue Bloods. In February 2025, CBS announced that it had ordered a spin-off—Boston Blue—straight to series for the 2025–26 television season; the series is executive produced by Wahlberg and focuses on his character of Danny Reagan, who transfers to the Boston Police Department alongside his son Sean. It premiered on October 17, 2025, inheriting the former timeslot of Blue Bloods.
