= True Colors (film) =

1991 film by Herbert Ross

- Theatrical release poster
- Directed by: Herbert Ross
- Written by: Kevin Wade
- Produced by: Herbert Ross; Laurence Mark
- Starring: John Cusack; James Spader; Imogen Stubbs; Mandy Patinkin; Richard Widmark
- Cinematography: Dante Spinotti
- Edited by: Robert M. Reitano; Stephen A. Rotter
- Music by: Trevor Jones
- Production company: Laurence Mark Productions
- Distributed by: Paramount Pictures
- Release date: March 15, 1991
- Running time: 111 minutes
- Country: United States
- Language: English
- Budget: $20 million
- Box office: $418,807

True Colors is a 1991 American political drama film directed by Herbert Ross, written by Kevin Wade, and starring John Cusack, James Spader, Imogen Stubbs, Mandy Patinkin, and (in one of his final film roles) Richard Widmark.

== Plot ==
In 1990, Peter Burton and best friend Tim Garrity nervously await the results of Peter's congressional election, with Tim narrating about how this came to be. The two had met seven years earlier following an argument in the parking lot at University of Virginia School of Law. After discovering that they are to be roommates, the men become close friends. Tim, who comes from an affluent family, plans a career with the Department of Justice, a fact that doesn't sit well with his girlfriend, Diana, the daughter of Senator Stiles. Diana effectively ends the relationship before Tim has a chance to propose. Peter, who is embarrassed by his lower-class roots, plans a career in politics, eventually manipulating his way into a job on a congressman's campaign staff.

The friendship between them is severely tested when Peter confesses to Tim during a ski vacation that he and Diana have been carrying on an affair. He adds that he plans to ask Diana to marry him. Tim, angry at the betrayal, speeds off down a hazardous ski trail. The less experienced Peter follows him down with far less grace than Tim. There's a steep cliff at the end. Tim hesitates to warn Peter, but finally does so. Unfortunately, Peter doesn't hear Tim's belated warnings in time, hurtles down to the bottom breaking his leg and cracking two ribs. Tim forgives Peter and even agrees to be the best man at Peter and Diana's wedding.

Shortly after marrying Diana, Peter falls under the influence of John Palmieri, who has ties to organized crime and political corruption. He finances Peter's campaign to gain corrupt influence. Meanwhile, things have begun to spiral out of control in Peter's extended family. Earlier in the film, Stiles is diagnosed with early onset Alzheimer's disease, something that will end his political career. Peter seizes the opportunity to manipulate his father-in-law into supporting his run for Congress. When the older man refuses, Peter threatens to leak news of the illness to the press. The senator reluctantly acquiesces, but promises Peter that he will eventually get caught.

Tim, who by this time has risen through the ranks of the Department of Justice, launches an investigation into political corruption that will eventually lead back to Palmieri. When Palmieri discovers Peter's ties to Tim, he bullies Peter into setting Tim up by putting him in touch with a bogus tipster. Tim reveals the investigation to a reporter, creating public embarrassment for the DOJ and enabling Palmieri's corrupt plan. Tim is suspended, and Peter hires him to work for him on his upcoming campaign, believing he left the DOJ. Stiles reveals the conversation that he had with Peter to Diana and she decides to divorce Peter. Shortly thereafter, Tim discovers Peter's role in getting him suspended from his job but he denies it to keep Peter's trust. Diana reveals she has filed for divorce. Tim volunteers to help the DOJ work to bring Peter down.

Tim works diligently to gather evidence of Peter's dealings with Palmieri. He convinces his DOJ superiors to set up surveillance in a hotel room. After Peter wins the election, he and Tim adjourn to the hotel room. Tim tries to get Peter to admit details of his shady dealings with Palmieri. Peter becomes suspicious and Tim comes clean about his role. He also tells Peter that Palmieri is being arraigned at that very moment. Peter viciously attacks Tim. When the fighting subsides and the two calm down, Tim tells Peter he has brought ruin upon himself but Peter says it was all necessary to achieve his goals.

After Peter gives his victory speech, he is arrested and charged with political corruption. The movie ends a few months later when Peter drops by Tim's apartment to drop off a case of champagne, fulfilling the bet made at the New Year's Eve party years before. Peter reveals that he will not be sworn into office, and that he has been offered immunity in exchange for testimony against Palmieri. Tim then tells Peter that he will be forced to testify against him if he does not accept the plea deal. The two have a reconciliation of sorts and go their separate ways, with Peter maintaining that his political career may not be completely ruined.

== Cast ==
- John Cusack as Peter Burton
- James Spader as Tim Garrity
- Imogen Stubbs as Diana Stiles
- Mandy Patinkin as John Palmieri
- Richard Widmark as Senator James Stiles
- Dina Merrill as Joan Stiles
- Philip Bosco as Senator Steubens
- Paul Guilfoyle as John Lawry
- Brad Sullivan as Abernathy
- Don McManus as Doug Stubblefield
- Rae Norman as Fanne
- Mary Mara as Sophia Palmeri

== Reception ==
The film received mixed reviews.

On the review aggregator website Rotten Tomatoes, 44% of 18 critics' reviews are positive, with an average rating of 5/10.

=== Box office ===
Produced on a budget of $20 million, the film grossed just $418,807 in its limited theatrical run.

=== In Pop Culture ===
On the TV show Seinfeld, Jerry has two VHS copies of True Colors on his shelf, amongst other movies.
