= Sami Gayle =

American actress (born 1996)

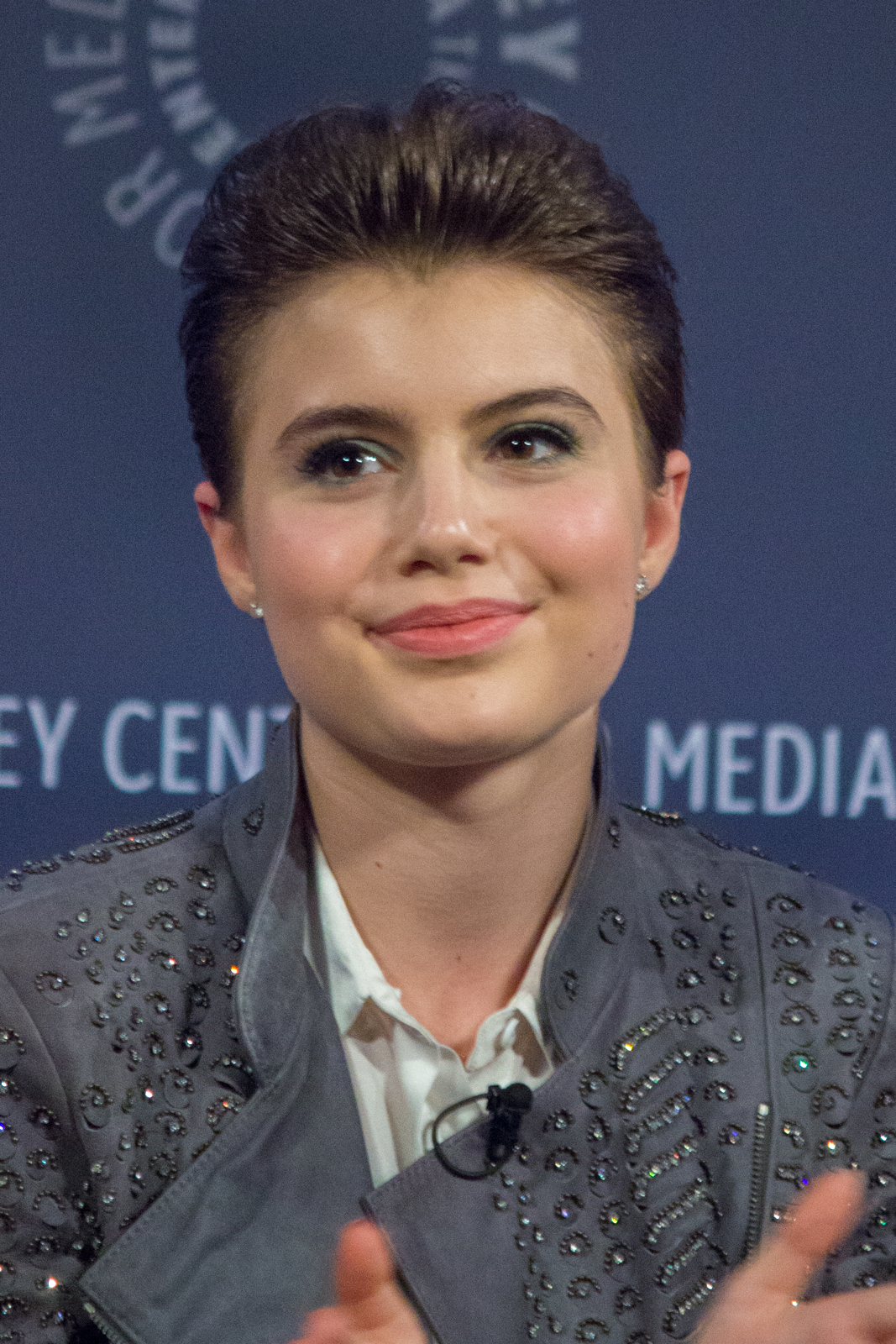
- At PaleyFest in October 2014
- Born: Samantha Gail Klitzman; January 22, 1996 (age 30); Weston, Florida, U.S.
- Education: Columbia University
- Occupation: Actress
- Years active: 2009–present

Samantha Gail Klitzman (born January 22, 1996) is an American actress. She is best known for her role as Nicky Reagan in the CBS series Blue Bloods.

== Early life ==
Klitzman was born and raised in Weston, Florida into a Jewish family. Her mother Robin previously owned her own business and currently works as her agent. Her father is Larry Klitzman, an attorney. Gayle was home-schooled and followed Advanced Placement (AP) curricula in all subjects. She was nationally ranked in Public Forum Debate and has received two bids to compete at the Tournament of Champions, putting her among the top debaters nationwide. She studied political science and art history at Columbia University and graduated in 2018.

== Career ==
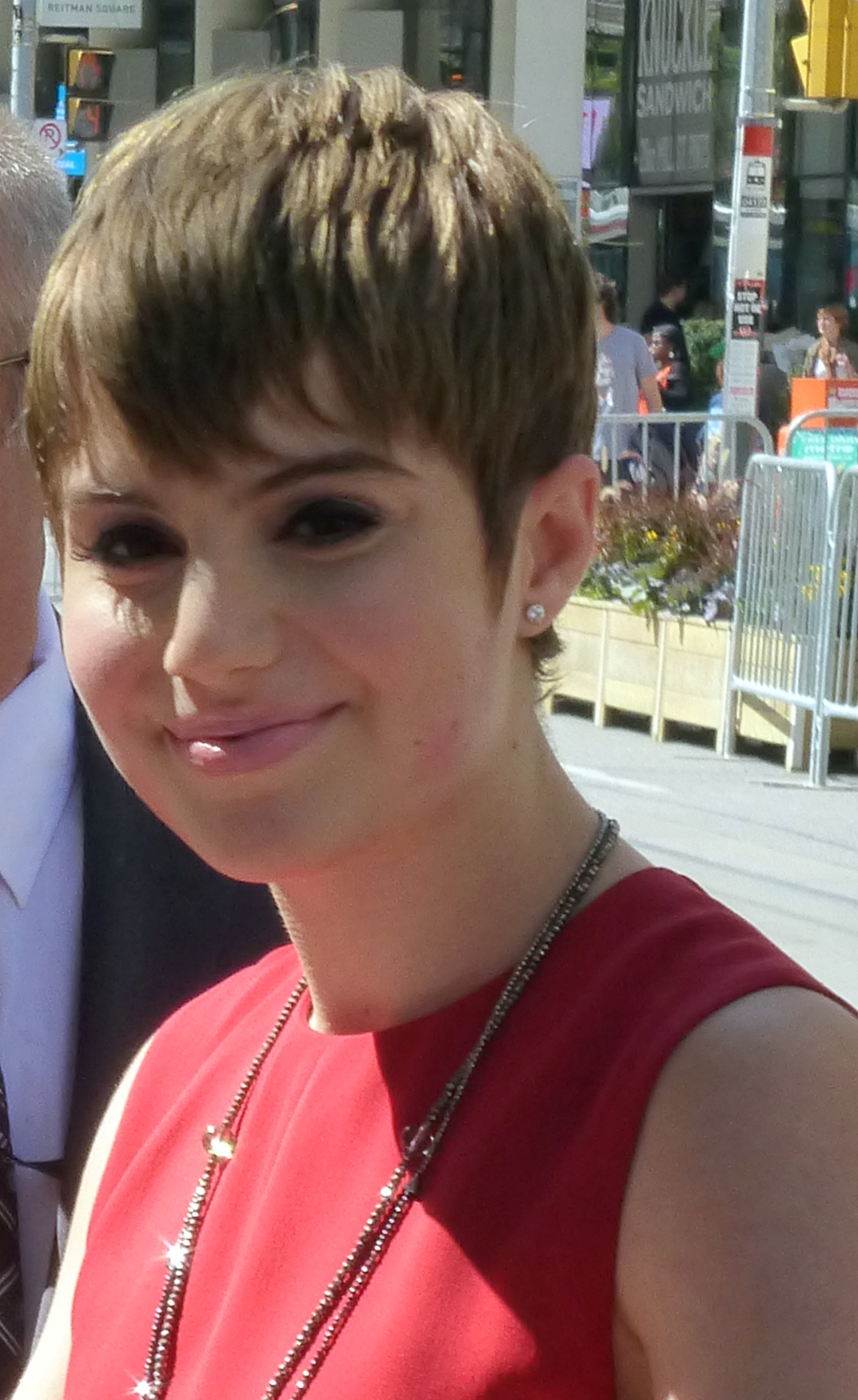
Gayle at the 2013 Toronto International Film Festival

Gayle began her acting career as Baby June in the off-Broadway production of Gypsy starring Patti LuPone. She reprised her role when the production transferred to Broadway a few months later. She later starred in the off-Broadway plays Oohrah! at the Atlantic Theatre Company and MCC Theatre's Family Week under the direction of Jonathan Demme. Gayle was featured in the 2007 Broadway production of Dr. Seuss' How the Grinch Stole Christmas! The Musical.

In addition to her role on Blue Bloods, Gayle guest starred on USA's Royal Pains and had a recurring role on the CBS soap opera As the World Turns. She starred in Detachment, directed by Tony Kaye and released in 2012. She also appeared in Stolen (2012) and The Congress (2013). She co-starred in the 2014 film adaptation of Vampire Academy, as Mia Rinaldi. In 2018, Gayle starred in the original Netflix romantic comedy Candy Jar.

After appearing as a regular character on Blue Bloods from seasons 2 through 10, Gayle made only one appearance in season 11 and another in the series finale. The absence was owed to Gayle graduating from Columbia University and being busy with other projects.

In 2023, Gayle returned to theatre, originating the role of Adele the stepsister in the Broadway cast of Andrew Lloyd Webber's Bad Cinderella.

== Filmography ==
Film and television roles
Year	Title	Role	Notes
2009–2010	As the World Turns	Hayden Lawson	3 episodes
2010–2024	Blue Bloods	Nicole "Nicky" Reagan-Boyle	Recurring (season 1); Also starring (seasons 2–4); Main role (seasons 5–10); Guest (seasons 11, 13 & 14)
2011	Royal Pains	Natalie	Episode: "A History of Violins"
2011	Detachment	Erica	Film
2012	Stolen	Alison Loeb	Film
2013	The Congress	Sarah Wright	Film
2013	Hateship, Loveship	Edith	Film
2014	Vampire Academy	Mia Rinaldi	Film
2014	Noah	Refugee Daughter	Film
2018	Candy Jar	Lona Skinner	Streaming film
