= Kevin Wade =

American screenwriter

- Born: March 9, 1954 (age 72); Chappaqua, New York, US
- Education: Connecticut College
- Occupations: Screenwriter, television producer
- Years active: 1978–present
- Spouse: Polly Draper (m. 1983; div. 1990) Sasha Clifton (m. 1991)
- Children: 2

Kevin Wade (born March 9, 1954) is an American screenwriter and television producer.

== Early life and education ==
Wade was born in Chappaqua, New York, and attended Connecticut College.

== Career ==
Before his writing career, Wade acted in two films for underground filmmaker Mark Rappaport, including The Scenic Route (1978). He wrote the play Key Exchange, which was produced off-Broadway in 1981 and adapted to film in 1985. Seven years later he received his first screen credit for Working Girl, which earned him nominations for the Golden Globe Award for Best Screenplay and the Writers Guild of America Award for Best Original Screenplay.

Additional film credits include True Colors, Mr. Baseball, Junior, Meet Joe Black, and Maid in Manhattan. He did an uncredited rewrite on the James Bond film GoldenEye, but was acknowledged in the naming of Bond's CIA ally Jack Wade.

For television, Wade created and executive produced the short-lived ABC drama series Cashmere Mafia. He also wrote the seven episodes that were broadcast by the network before the show was canceled. He joined the writing staff of the CBS drama Blue Bloods in its first season and has served as its executive producer/showrunner since the second season. He entered into an overall deal with CBS Studios in 2013. In 2019 he was nominated for a Edgar Award for the episode “My Aim is True”.

== Personal life ==
Wade was married to actress Polly Draper from 1983 to 1988. He remarried Sasha Clifton in 1991 and they have two children together.

== Filmography ==
=== Film ===
Year	Title	Director	Notes
1988	Working Girl	Mike Nichols	
1991	True Colors	Herbert Ross	
1992	Mr. Baseball	Fred Schepisi	Co-written with Monte Merrick and Gary Ross
1994	Junior	Ivan Reitman	Co-written with Chris Conrad
1998	Meet Joe Black	Martin Brest	Co-written with Bo Goldman, Jeff Reno and Ron Osborn
2002	Maid in Manhattan	Wayne Wang	

==== Uncredited script contributions ====
- GoldenEye (1995)
- Daylight (1996)
- Summer Catch (2001)
- Bridge to Terabithia (2007)

=== Television ===
Year	Title	Writer	Exec. Producer	Creator	Notes
2008	Cashmere Mafia	Yes	No	Yes	Writer; 1 episode
2011-24	Blue Bloods	Yes	Yes	No	Writer; 34 episodes Showrunner; Seasons 1-12

== Awards and nominations ==
Institution	Year	Category	Work	Result
Golden Globe Awards	1989	Best Screenplay	Working Girl	Nominated
Edgar Awards	2019	Best Episode in a TV Series	Blue Bloods (“My Aim is True”)	Nominated
Writers Guild of America Awards	1989	Best Original Screenplay	Working Girl	Nominated
