= Will Estes =

American actor (born 1978)

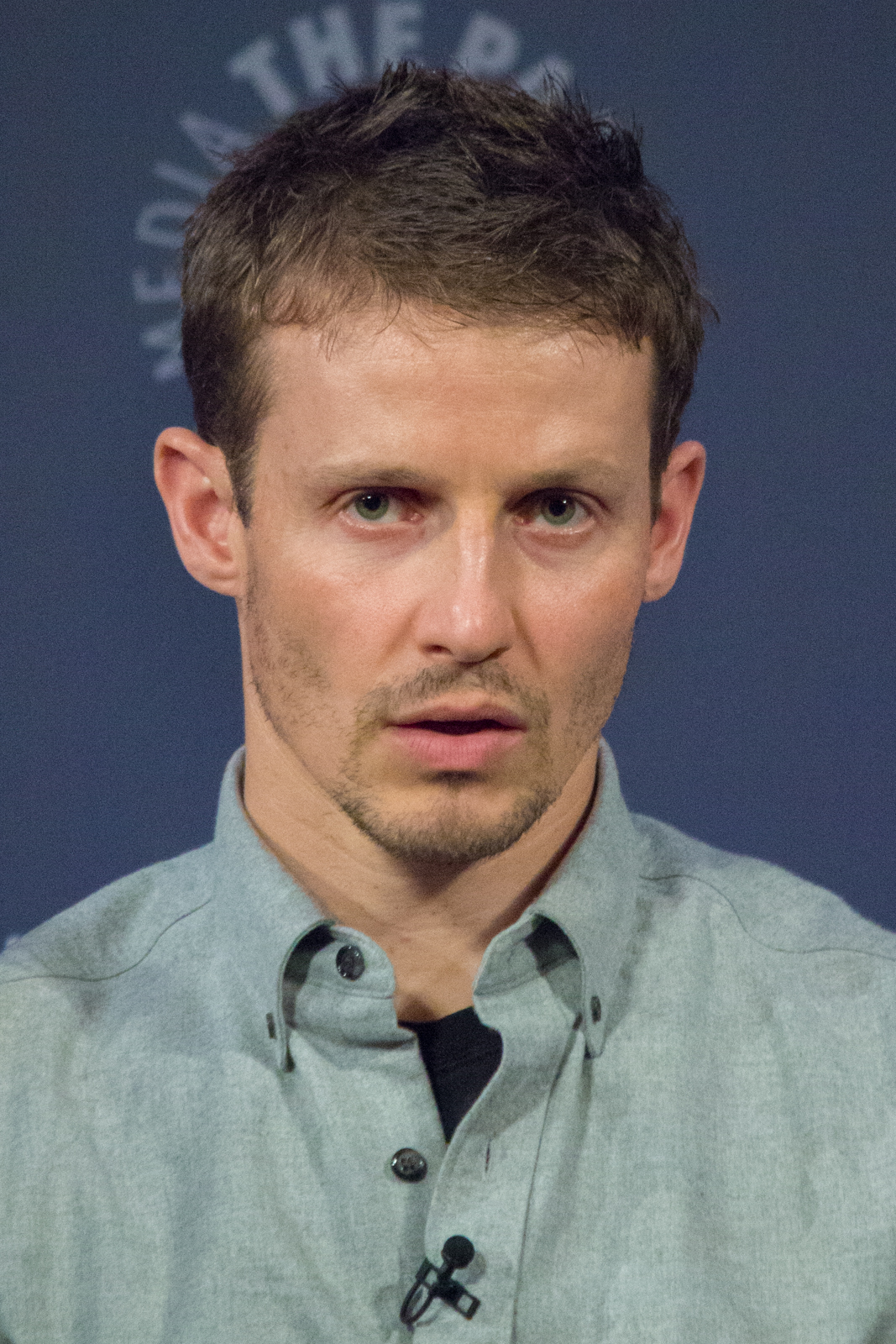
- Estes in PaleyFest 2014
- Born: William Estes Nipper; October 21, 1978 (age 47); Los Angeles, California, U.S.
- Occupation: Actor
- Years active: 1984–present
- Website: www.willestes.com

William Estes Nipper (/ˈɛstəz/; born October 21, 1978) is an American actor. He is known for his role from 2010 to 2024 on CBS police drama Blue Bloods as Jameson "Jamie" Reagan, a New York City Police Department officer and the youngest son of the police commissioner, played by Tom Selleck. Prior to that role, he starred as J.J. Pryor on the NBC drama American Dreams.

== Personal life ==
Estes was born and raised in Los Angeles, California, where he currently resides. He has spoken about his interest in environmentalism and described himself as "not completely vegetarian."

== Career ==
Estes' break-out movie role was Seaman Ronald 'Rabbit' Parker on U-571. Early in his career, he did many commercials including Fruit of the Loom and numerous guest starring roles in series like Highway to Heaven and Santa Barbara.

Estes landed his first major role in a television series when he was chosen out of 700 other children to play Will McCollough (essentially the "Timmy" role) in the syndicated New Lassie series, which ran from 1989 to 1992. Since then, he has had many starring roles in television series and he dabbled in the music video industry. He has appeared in Meat Loaf's video "Objects in the Rear View Mirror May Appear Closer than They Are" (from Bat Out of Hell II: Back into Hell). He starred in Bon Jovi's music video "It's My Life" alongside Shiri Appleby. In 2000, according to a 2005 Soap Talk interview, Estes was asked by Jon Bon Jovi to be in his music video after he worked with Estes on U-571. Estes did most of his own stunts in the video.

Estes had a leading role in the Fox series Reunion. The series followed six best friends over the course of 20 years, with each episode marking the next successive year. When the group meets up for its 20th high school reunion, one turns up dead at the end of the night. In late 2005, Fox announced that the series would be canceled because of low ratings and the identity of the murderer would not be revealed.

Estes portrayed Jack Kerouac in the 2007 short film Luz Del Mundo, written by Ty Roberts and David Trimble, directed by Ty Roberts, and produced by Ryan McWhirter and John Pitts. He has also appeared in a couple of photographs, in the books Hollywood Splash and Men Before 10 AM Too. He was nominated four times for one award, the Young Artist Awards for The New Lassie and Kirk.

From 2010 to 2024, Estes played Jamie Reagan in the police procedural television series Blue Bloods.

== Filmography ==
=== Film ===
Year	Title	Role	Notes
1991	Dutch	Teddy	known as Will Nipper at the time; film released in the UK and Australia as Driving Me Crazy
1993	Once Upon a Forest	Willy	Voice role; as Will Nipper
1995	How to Make an American Quilt	Boy at Party	
1999	Blue Ridge Fall	Taz	
2000	U-571	Seaman Ronald 'Rabbit' Parker	
2000	Terror Tract	Sean Goodwin	Segment: "Come to Granny"
2001	Mimic 2	Nicky	Straight to video
2001	New Port South	Chris	
2001	My Husband's Double Life	Ted Welsh	
2002	May	Chris, Adam's roommate	
2004	Charity	Repo Man	Short film
2005	The Drive	Aaron	
2009	Not Since You	Billy	
2011	Magic Valley	Jimmy Duvante	
2012	The Dark Knight Rises	Officer Simon Jansen	
2013	Mission Park	The Dealer	
2013	Automotive	Kansas	
2014	Dangerous Attraction	Morgan Pierce	
2015	Anchors	Dylan	

=== Television ===
Year	Title	Role	Notes
1984	Santa Barbara	Brandon DeMott Capwell	Temporary replacement (unknown episodes)
1988–1989	Highway to Heaven	Louis (at 11); Samuel Hays (age 7)	as Will Nipper; Episode: "The Correspondent"; Episode: "Merry Christmas from Grandpa"
1989	Murphy's Law	Young Daedalus Patrick Murphy, the role played by George Segal in the TV series	Episode: "Doing It the Hard Way Is Always Easier"
1989–1992	The New Lassie	Will McCullough	Series regular; as Will Nipper
1990	Miracle Landing	David Kornberg	TV movie; as Will Nipper
1990	Menu for Murder	Chad	TV movie; as Will Nipper
1991	The Last Halloween		TV movie; as Will Nipper
1992	Baywatch	Cooper	Episode: "The Chamber"; as Will Nipper
1992	The Legend of Prince Valiant	Stable-Boy/Squire	Voice role; Episode: "The Lesson Twice Learned"; as Will Nipper
1992	Harry and the Hendersons	Brad	Episode: "Harry the Mascot"
1993	Jonny's Golden Quest	Jonny Quest	TV movie; voice role; as Will Nipper
1993	It Had to be You	Christopher Quinn	Series regular (6 episodes)
1993	When Love Kills: The Seduction of John Hearn	Gary Black	TV movie; as Will Nipper
1993	Circus of the Stars Gives Kids the World	Himself	Trapeze Artist
1994	Step by Step	Kevin Phillips	Episode: "Growing Up is Hard to Do"
1994–1996	Boy Meets World	Alex; Dylan	Episodes: "Turnaround", "Career Day"; Episode: "Hair Today, Goon Tomorrow"
1995	Brother's Destiny	Michael Murphy	TV movie
1995	Full House	Andrew Berkley	Episodes: "Michelle Rides Again, Part One & Part Two"
1995–1996	Kirk	Cory Hartman	Series regular (31 episodes)
1997	Meego	Trip Parker	Series regular (12 episodes)
1997–1998	The Secret World of Alex Mack	Hunter Reeves	Recurring role (Season 4; 6 episodes)
1998	Diagnosis: Murder	Erik Fincher	Episode: "An Education in Murder"
1998	Kelly Kelly	Sean Kelly	Series regular (7 episodes)
1999–2000	7th Heaven	Andrew Nayloss	Recurring role (5 episodes)
2000	The Fugitive	Jesse Larson	Episode: "Guilt"
2001	The Familiar Stranger	Ted Walsh	TV movie
2002–2005	American Dreams	J.J. Pryor	Series regular (60 episodes)
2003	Celebrity Jeopardy!	Himself	Contestant
2004	See You In My Dreams	Ben	TV movie
2005	Reunion	Will Malloy	Series regular (9 aired episodes, 4 unaired episodes)
2005	The Dive From Clausen's Pier	Mike Mayor	TV movie
2005	Pet Star	Himself	Judge
2006	Law & Order: Special Victims Unit	Adam Halder	Episode: "Class"
2008	Squeegees	Pee-Wee Machachi	Webisodes available
2008	Eleventh Hour	Kevin Pierce	Episode: "Surge"
2009	In Plain Sight	Henry Atkins/Henry Adams	Episode: "Gilted Lily"
2009	The Cleaner		Episode: "Crossing the Threshold"
2010–2024	Blue Bloods	Officer/Sergeant Jamie Reagan	Main role
2012	Shadow of Fear	Morgan Pierce	TV movie
2026	Boston Blue	Sergeant Jamie Regan	Episode: "Blood Diamonds"

== Awards and nominations ==
Year	Award	Category	Nominated work	Result	Ref.
1990	Young Artist Awards	Best Young Actor in an Off-Primetime Family Series	The New Lassie	Nominated	
1991	Young Artist Awards	Best Young Actor Starring in an Off-Primetime Series	The New Lassie	Nominated	
1992	Young Artist Awards	Best Young Actor Starring in an Off-Primetime or Cable Series	The New Lassie	Nominated	
1996	Young Artist Awards	Best Performance by a Young Actor – TV Comedy Series	Kirk	Nominated	
2014	Prism Award	Performance in a Drama Series Episode	Blue Bloods	Won	
2015	Golden Honu Award	Actor of the Year	Blue Bloods	Won	
