= List of Blue Bloods episodes =

American police procedural TV series by Robin Green and Mitchell Burgess (2010-24)

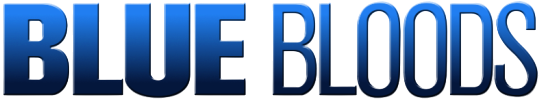

Blue Bloods is an American police procedural television series created by Robin Green and Mitchell Burgess. It aired from September 24, 2010 until December 13, 2024. The series centers on the Reagans, a family of police officers in New York City. Frank Reagan (Tom Selleck) is the police commissioner with three grown children working in law enforcement: the oldest, Danny (Donnie Wahlberg), a pragmatic detective; Erin (Bridget Moynahan), an assistant district attorney who prosecutes many of the offenders Danny apprehends; and Jamie (Will Estes), a Harvard Law School graduate and a patrol cop in the NYPD. Frank's second son, Joseph, an NYPD detective, was killed in the line of duty while investigating a group of dirty cops nicknamed "The Blue Templar" 15 months prior to the start of the series.

== Series overview ==
Season	Episodes		Originally released		Rank	Avg. viewership (in millions)
Season	Episodes		First released	Last released	Rank	Avg. viewership (in millions)
1	22		September 24, 2010	May 13, 2011	19	12.58
2	22		September 23, 2011	May 11, 2012	22	12.15
3	23		September 28, 2012	May 10, 2013	14	13.16
4	22		September 27, 2013	May 9, 2014	10	13.63
5	22		September 26, 2014	May 1, 2015	13	13.77
6	22		September 25, 2015	May 6, 2016	10	13.07
7	22		September 23, 2016	May 5, 2017	8	14.07
8	22		September 29, 2017	May 11, 2018	12	13.09
9	22		September 28, 2018	May 10, 2019	8	12.83
10	19		September 27, 2019	May 1, 2020	7	11.96
11	16		December 4, 2020	May 14, 2021	8	10.16
12	20		October 1, 2021	May 6, 2022	6	9.78
13	21		October 7, 2022	May 19, 2023	5	9.40
14	18	10	February 16, 2024	May 17, 2024	TBA	TBA
14	18	8	October 18, 2024	December 13, 2024	TBA	TBA

== Episodes ==
=== Season 1 (2010–11) ===
No.	Title	Directed by	Written by	Original release date	Prod. code	U.S. viewers (millions)
1	"Pilot"	Michael Cuesta	Robin Green & Mitchell Burgess	September 24, 2010	101	13.01
2	"Samaritan"	Ralph Hemecker	Ken Sanzel	October 1, 2010	102	11.32
3	"Privilege"	Stephen Gyllenhaal	Brian Burns	October 8, 2010	103	11.15
4	"Officer Down"	Ralph Hemecker	Thomas Kelly	October 15, 2010	104	10.39
5	"What You See"	Félix Alcalá	Julie Hébert	October 22, 2010	105	11.15
6	"Smack Attack"	Gwyneth Horder-Payton	Siobhan Byrne-O'Connor	October 29, 2010	106	11.61
7	"Brothers"	Frederick K. Keller	Mark Rosner	November 5, 2010	107	10.31
8	"Chinatown"	Michael Pressman	Diana Son	November 12, 2010	108	10.57
9	"Re-Do"	Rosemary Rodriguez	Julie Hébert	November 19, 2010	109	11.36
10	"After Hours"	Alex Zakrzewski	Brian Burns	December 3, 2010	110	11.31
11	"Little Fish"	Michael Pressman	Siobhan Byrne-O'Connor	January 19, 2011	111	12.29
12	"Family Ties"	Stephen Gyllenhaal	Mark Rosner	January 26, 2011	113	12.09
13	"Hall of Mirrors"	Frederick K. Keller	Thomas Kelly	February 2, 2011	112	11.31
14	"My Funny Valentine"	John Polson	Diana Son	February 9, 2011	114	11.79
15	"Dedication"	Jan Eliasberg	Kevin Wade	February 18, 2011	115	11.16
16	"Age of Innocence"	Félix Alcalá	Amanda Green	February 25, 2011	116	11.65
17	"Silver Star"	Ralph Hemecker	Thomas Kelly	March 11, 2011	117	11.60
18	"To Tell the Truth"	Alex Zakrzewski	Siobhan Byrne-O'Connor	April 1, 2011	119	10.91
19	"Model Behavior"	Matt Penn	Brian Burns	April 8, 2011	118	10.71
20	"All That Glitters"	Michael Pressman	Gwendolyn M. Parker	April 29, 2011	120	10.06
21	"Cellar Boy"	Karen Gaviola	Story by : Diana Son; Teleplay by : Diana Son & Robin Green & Mitchell Burgess	May 6, 2011	121	10.38
22	"The Blue Templar"	Frederick K. Keller	Kevin Wade	May 13, 2011	122	11.79

=== Season 2 (2011–12) ===
No. overall	No. in season	Title	Directed by	Written by	Original release date	Prod. code	U.S. viewers (millions)
23	1	"Mercy"	Michael Pressman	Kevin Wade	September 23, 2011	201	12.06
24	2	"Friendly Fire"	John Polson	Brian Burns	September 30, 2011	203	11.30
25	3	"Critical Condition"	Ralph Hemecker	Thomas Kelly	October 7, 2011	202	11.29
26	4	"Innocence"	Alex Zakrzewski	Siobhan Byrne-O'Connor	October 14, 2011	204	11.19
27	5	"A Night on the Town"	Ralph Hemecker	Kevin Wade	October 21, 2011	205	10.90
28	6	"Black and Blue"	Alex Chapple	Brian Burns	November 4, 2011	206	12.73
29	7	"Lonely Hearts Club"	Félix Alcalá	Vanessa Rojas	November 11, 2011	207	11.30
30	8	"Thanksgiving"	Steve Gomer	Shaun Cassidy	November 18, 2011	209	12.41
31	9	"Moonlighting"	Robert Harmon	Kevin Wade	December 2, 2011	210	11.05
32	10	"Whistle Blower"	Robert Harmon	Thomas Kelly	January 6, 2012	208	11.34
33	11	"The Uniform"	Alex Zakrzewski	John Moskowitz	January 13, 2012	211	12.08
34	12	"The Job"	Nick Gomez	Brian Burns	February 3, 2012	212	11.44
35	13	"Leap of Faith"	David M. Barrett	David Black	February 10, 2012	213	11.82
36	14	"Parenthood"	John Polson	Siobhan Byrne-O'Connor	February 17, 2012	214	10.81
37	15	"The Life We Chose"	Félix Alcalá	Thomas Kelly	February 24, 2012	215	11.35
38	16	"Women with Guns"	Martha Mitchell	Kevin Wade	March 2, 2012	216	11.47
39	17	"Reagan vs. Reagan"	Jim McKay	Ed Zuckerman	March 9, 2012	217	11.27
40	18	"No Questions Asked"	Christine Moore	Vanessa Rojas & Brian Burns	March 30, 2012	218	10.72
41	19	"Some Kind of Hero"	Alex Zakrzewski	Siobhan Byrne-O'Connor	April 6, 2012	219	10.92
42	20	"Working Girls"	James Whitmore Jr.	Ian Biederman	April 27, 2012	220	10.47
43	21	"Collateral Damage"	Ralph Hemecker	Kevin Wade & Thomas Kelly	May 4, 2012	221	10.36
44	22	"Mother's Day"	Michael Pressman	Brian Burns	May 11, 2012	222	10.73

=== Season 3 (2012–13) ===
No. overall	No. in season	Title	Directed by	Written by	Original release date	Prod. code	U.S. viewers (millions)
45	1	"Family Business"	Alex Chapple	Brian Burns	September 28, 2012	302	11.22
46	2	"Domestic Disturbance"	Michael Pressman	Ian Biederman	October 5, 2012	301	9.77
47	3	"Old Wounds"	John Polson	Siobhan Byrne-O'Connor	October 12, 2012	303	10.53
48	4	"Scorched Earth"	Peter Werner	Dawn DeNoon	October 19, 2012	304	10.29
49	5	"Risk and Reward"	Ralph Hemecker	Thomas Kelly	October 26, 2012	306	11.06
50	6	"Greener Grass"	Martha Mitchell	Daniel Truly	November 2, 2012	308	11.05
51	7	"Nightmares"	John Polson	Kevin Wade	November 9, 2012	305	11.32
52	8	"Higher Education"	Robert Harmon	Ian Biederman	November 30, 2012	307	11.31
53	9	"Secrets and Lies"	David M. Barrett	Siobhan Byrne-O'Connor	December 7, 2012	309	11.17
54	10	"Fathers and Sons"	Michael Pressman	Brian Burns	January 4, 2013	310	10.18
55	11	"Front Page News"	Robert Harmon	Dawn DeNoon	January 11, 2013	311	11.22
56	12	"Framed"	David M. Barrett	Daniel Truly	January 18, 2013	312	11.64
57	13	"Inside Jobs"	Alex Hall	Kevin Wade	February 1, 2013	313	11.50
58	14	"Men in Black"	Alex Chapple	Teleplay by : Ish Goldstein & Ian Biederman; Story by : Ish Goldstein	February 8, 2013	314	11.24
59	15	"Warriors"	Oz Scott	Siobhan Byrne-O'Connor	February 15, 2013	315	10.73
60	16	"Quid Pro Quo"	Alex Zakrzewski	Brian Burns	February 22, 2013	316	11.21
61	17	"Protest Too Much"	Larry Teng	Dawn DeNoon	March 8, 2013	317	10.72
62	18	"No Regrets"	David M. Barrett	Daniel Truly	March 15, 2013	318	10.41
63	19	"Loss of Faith"	James Whitmore, Jr.	Seth Pearlman	April 5, 2013	319	11.00
64	20	"Ends and Means"	John Polson	Ian Biederman	April 12, 2013	320	10.65
65	21	"Devil's Breath"	Alex Chapple	Siobhan Byrne-O'Connor	April 26, 2013	321	10.46
66	22	"The Bitter End"	Christine Moore	Brian Burns	May 3, 2013	322	10.02
67	23	"This Way Out"	Peter Werner	Kevin Wade	May 10, 2013	323	10.30

=== Season 4 (2013–14) ===
No. overall	No. in season	Title	Directed by	Written by	Original release date	Prod. code	U.S. viewers (millions)
68	1	"Unwritten Rules"	David M. Barrett	Ian Biederman	September 27, 2013	401	11.70
69	2	"The City That Never Sleeps"	John Behring	Kevin Wade	October 4, 2013	402	11.37
70	3	"To Protect and Serve"	Peter Werner	Siobhan Byrne-O'Connor	October 11, 2013	403	10.56
71	4	"The Truth About Lying"	Robert Duncan McNeill	Brian Burns	October 18, 2013	404	10.56
72	5	"Lost and Found"	Alex Chapple	Daniel Truly	October 25, 2013	405	11.27
73	6	"Growing Boys"	Eric Laneuville	Willie Reale	November 1, 2013	406	11.01
74	7	"Drawing Dead"	Ralph Hemecker	Ian Biederman	November 8, 2013	407	10.97
75	8	"Justice Served"	David M. Barrett	Siobhan Byrne-O'Connor	November 15, 2013	408	11.79
76	9	"Bad Blood"	Robert Harmon	Daniel Truly	November 22, 2013	409	11.90
77	10	"Mistaken Identity"	David Solomon	Diana Son & Ian Biederman	December 13, 2013	410	10.94
78	11	"Ties That Bind"	Christine Moore	Brian Burns	December 20, 2013	411	10.52
79	12	"The Bogeyman"	David M. Barrett	Kevin Wade and Benjamin Cummings & Orson Cummings	January 10, 2014	412	12.68
80	13	"Unfinished Business"	Alex Chapple	Siobhan Byrne-O'Connor	January 17, 2014	413	12.62
81	14	"Manhattan Queens"	Donnie Wahlberg	Willie Reale	January 31, 2014	414	12.93
82	15	"Open Secrets"	Eric Laneuville	Ian Biederman	February 28, 2014	415	11.96
83	16	"Insult to Injury"	David M. Barrett	Teleplay by : Daniel Truly; Story by : Daniel Truly & Andrew Raab	March 7, 2014	416	12.03
84	17	"Knockout Game"	Robert Harmon	Brian Burns	March 14, 2014	417	11.68
85	18	"Righting Wrongs"	Alex Zakrzewski	Siobhan Byrne-O'Connor	April 4, 2014	418	11.69
86	19	"Secret Arrangements"	Tawnia McKiernan	Teleplay by : Willie Reale & Sinead Daly; Story by : Sinead Daly	April 11, 2014	419	11.05
87	20	"Custody Battle"	Alex Chapple	Ian Biederman	April 25, 2014	420	11.05
88	21	"Above and Beyond"	Greg Beeman	Daniel Truly	May 2, 2014	421	11.59
89	22	"Exiles"	David M. Barrett	Kevin Wade	May 9, 2014	422	11.78

=== Season 5 (2014–15) ===
No. overall	No. in season	Title	Directed by	Written by	Original release date	Prod. code	U.S. viewers (millions)
90	1	"Partners"	David M. Barrett	Siobhan Byrne-O'Connor	September 26, 2014	501	10.88
91	2	"Forgive and Forget"	Eric Laneuville	Willie Reale	October 3, 2014	503	10.85
92	3	"Burning Bridges"	John Behring	Ian Biederman	October 10, 2014	502	11.09
93	4	"Excessive Force"	Alex Zakrzewski	Brian Burns	October 17, 2014	504	10.70
94	5	"Loose Lips"	Alex Chapple	Daniel Truly	October 24, 2014	505	11.42
95	6	"Most Wanted"	Ralph Hemecker	Bryan Goluboff	October 31, 2014	506	11.39
96	7	"Shoot the Messenger"	David M. Barrett	Siobhan Byrne-O'Connor	November 7, 2014	507	11.51
97	8	"Power of the Press"	Tawnia McKiernan	Ian Biederman	November 21, 2014	508	11.62
98	9	"Under the Gun"	David M. Barrett	Willie Reale & Kevin Wade	December 12, 2014	509	11.09
99	10	"Sins of the Father"	David M. Barrett	Daniel Truly	January 2, 2015	511	11.61
100	11	"Baggage"	John Behring	Brian Burns	January 9, 2015	510	12.86
101	12	"Home Sweet Home"	Robert Harmon	Bryan Goluboff	January 16, 2015	512	12.61
102	13	"Love Stories"	Alex Zakrzewski	Siobhan Byrne-O'Connor	January 30, 2015	513	11.87
103	14	"The Poor Door"	Alex Chapple	Willie Reale	February 6, 2015	514	11.32
104	15	"Power Players"	David M. Barrett	Ian Biederman	February 13, 2015	515	11.46
105	16	"In the Box"	Holly Dale	Brian Burns	February 20, 2015	516	11.60
106	17	"Occupational Hazard"	David M. Barrett	Daniel Truly	March 6, 2015	517	11.03
107	18	"Bad Company"	Tawnia McKiernan	Bryan Goluboff	March 13, 2015	518	11.07
108	19	"Through the Looking Glass"	Eric Laneuville	Siobhan Byrne O'Connor	April 3, 2015	519	10.70
109	20	"Payback"	Alex Chapple	Lauren Gautier & Kevin Wade	April 10, 2015	520	10.31
110	21	"New Rules"	John Behring	Ian Biederman	April 24, 2015	521	10.00
111	22	"The Art of War"	David M. Barrett	Brian Burns	May 1, 2015	522	11.28

=== Season 6 (2015–16) ===
No. overall	No. in season	Title	Directed by	Written by	Original release date	Prod. code	U.S. viewers (millions)
112	1	"Worst Case Scenario"	David M. Barrett	Bryan Goluboff	September 25, 2015	603	10.08
113	2	"Absolute Power"	David M. Barrett	Siobhan Byrne O'Connor	October 2, 2015	601	11.41
114	3	"All the News That's Fit to Click"	Alex Chapple	Brian Burns	October 9, 2015	602	10.74
115	4	"With Friends Like These"	Heather Cappiello	Ian Beiderman	October 16, 2015	604	10.61
116	5	"Backstabbers"	John Behring	Dan Truly	October 23, 2015	605	10.42
117	6	"Rush to Judgment"	Peter Werner	Peter Blauner	October 30, 2015	606	9.70
118	7	"The Bullitt Mustang"	David M. Barrett	Teleplay by : Kevin Wade; Story by : Kevin Wade & Willie Reale	November 6, 2015	607	10.90
119	8	"Unsung Heroes"	Alex Chapple	Siobhan Byrne O'Connor	November 13, 2015	608	10.33
120	9	"Hold Outs"	Eric Laneuville	Brian Burns	November 20, 2015	609	11.01
121	10	"Flags of Our Fathers"	David M. Barrett	Ian Biederman	December 11, 2015	610	9.95
122	11	"Back in the Day"	Robert Harmon	Bryan Goluboff	January 8, 2016	612	10.85
123	12	"Cursed"	Peter Leto	Daniel Truly	January 15, 2016	611	10.62
124	13	"Stomping Grounds"	Don Thorin, Jr.	Peter Blauner	January 22, 2016	613	11.56
125	14	"The Road to Hell"	Thomas R. Moore	Siobhan Byrne O'Connor	February 12, 2016	614	10.92
126	15	"Fresh Start"	David M. Barrett	Brian Burns	February 19, 2016	615	10.74
127	16	"Help Me Help You"	Alex Chapple	Ian Biederman	February 26, 2016	616	10.33
128	17	"Friends in Need"	P.J. Pesce	Kevin Riley & Kevin Wade	March 11, 2016	617	9.83
129	18	"Town Without Pity"	David M. Barrett	Peter Blauner	April 1, 2016	618	10.40
130	19	"Blast from the Past"	Eric Laneuville	Bryan Goluboff	April 8, 2016	619	10.35
131	20	"Down the Rabbit Hole"	David M. Barrett	Siobhan Byrne O'Connor	April 15, 2016	620	10.41
132	21	"The Extra Mile"	John Behring	Brian Burns	April 29, 2016	621	10.13
133	22	"Blowback"	David M. Barrett	Ian Biederman	May 6, 2016	622	10.10

=== Season 7 (2016–17) ===
No. overall	No. in season	Title	Directed by	Written by	Original release date	Prod. code	U.S. viewers (millions)
134	1	"The Greater Good"	David M. Barrett	Siobhan Byrne-O'Connor	September 23, 2016	701	10.55
135	2	"Good Cop Bad Cop"	Kellie Cyrus	Brian Burns	September 30, 2016	704	10.56
136	3	"The Price of Justice"	John Behring	Ian Biederman	October 7, 2016	702	9.85
137	4	"Mob Rules"	Robert Harmon	Peter Blauner	October 14, 2016	703	10.22
138	5	"For the Community"	Peter Werner	Teleplay by : Blair Singer & Kevin Wade; Story by : Blair Singer	October 21, 2016	705	10.03
139	6	"Whistleblowers"	Eric Laneuville	Kevin Riley and Kevin Wade	October 28, 2016	706	8.88
140	7	"Guilt by Association"	Robert Harmon	Siobhan Byrne O'Connor	November 4, 2016	707	9.76
141	8	"Personal Business"	David M. Barrett	Ian Biederman	November 11, 2016	708	10.27
142	9	"Confessions"	Alex Zakrzewski	Brian Burns	November 18, 2016	709	10.36
143	10	"Unbearable Loss"	David M. Barrett	Peter Blauner	December 9, 2016	710	10.18
144	11	"Genetics"	Alex Chapple	Allie Solomon	January 6, 2017	711	10.79
145	12	"Not Fade Away"	Robert Harmon	Kevin Wade and Blair Singer	January 13, 2017	712	10.48
146	13	"The One That Got Away"	Jane Raab	Siobhan Byrne O'Connor	January 20, 2017	713	9.77
147	14	"In & Out"	John Behring	Ian Biederman	February 3, 2017	714	10.13
148	15	"Lost Souls"	Alex Chapple	Brian Burns	February 10, 2017	715	10.65
149	16	"Hard Bargain"	David M. Barrett	Peter Blauner	February 17, 2017	716	10.15
150	17	"Shadow of a Doubt"	P.J. Pesce	Kevin Riley	March 10, 2017	717	9.36
151	18	"A Deep Blue Goodbye"	David Barrett	Kevin Wade	March 31, 2017	718	9.62
152	19	"Love Lost"	Ralph Hemecker	Siobhan Byrne O'Connor	April 7, 2017	719	9.77
153	20	"No Retreat, No Surrender"	Jane Raab	Brian Burns	April 14, 2017	720	9.43
154	21	"Foreign Interference"	John Behring	Peter Blauner	April 28, 2017	721	8.74
155	22	"The Thin Blue Line"	David M. Barrett	Ian Biederman	May 5, 2017	722	9.24

=== Season 8 (2017–18) ===
No. overall	No. in season	Title	Directed by	Written by	Original release date	Prod. code	U.S. viewers (millions)
156	1	"Cutting Losses"	David M. Barrett	Siobhan Byrne O'Connor	September 29, 2017	801	10.04
157	2	"Ghosts of the Past"	John Behring	Kevin Riley	October 6, 2017	803	9.49
158	3	"The Enemy of My Enemy"	Robert Harmon	Ian Biederman	October 13, 2017	802	8.98
159	4	"Out of the Blue"	David M. Barrett	Brian Burns	October 20, 2017	804	9.08
160	5	"The Forgotten"	Ralph Hemecker	Allie Solomon	October 27, 2017	805	8.29
161	6	"Brushed Off"	Eric Laneuville	Daniel Truly	November 3, 2017	806	9.27
162	7	"Common Ground"	David M. Barrett	Siobhan Byrne O'Connor	November 10, 2017	807	9.94
163	8	"Pick Your Poison"	Heather Cappiello	Kevin Wade	November 17, 2017	808	9.25
164	9	"Pain Killers"	John Behring	Ian Biederman	December 1, 2017	809	8.84
165	10	"Heavy is the Head"	David M. Barrett	Brian Burns	December 8, 2017	810	9.40
166	11	"Second Chances"	Deran Sarafian	Kevin Riley	January 5, 2018	811	9.98
167	12	"The Brave"	Thomas R. Moore	Siobhan Byrne O'Connor	January 12, 2018	812	10.17
168	13	"Erasing History"	Jane Raab	Daniel Truly	January 19, 2018	813	9.45
169	14	"School of Hard Knocks"	Alex Zakrzewski	Ian Biederman	February 2, 2018	814	9.32
170	15	"Legacy"	David M. Barrett	Allie Solomon	March 2, 2018	815	9.06
171	16	"Tale of Two Cities"	Robert Duncan McNeill	Brian Burns	March 9, 2018	816	8.95
172	17	"Close Calls"	Jane Raab	Peter Blauner	March 30, 2018	817	8.43
173	18	"Friendship, Love, and Loyalty"	Robert Harmon	Siobhan Byrne O'Connor	April 6, 2018	818	8.75
174	19	"Risk Management"	David M. Barrett	Ian Biederman	April 13, 2018	819	8.25
175	20	"Your Six"	Ralph Hemecker	Brian Burns	April 27, 2018	820	8.13
176	21	"The Devil You Know"	John Behring	Peter Blauner	May 4, 2018	821	7.78
177	22	"My Aim Is True"	David M. Barrett	Kevin Wade	May 11, 2018	822	8.88

=== Season 9 (2018–19) ===
No. overall	No. in season	Title	Directed by	Written by	Original release date	Prod. code	U.S. viewers (millions)
178	1	"Playing with Fire"	David M. Barrett	Siobhan Byrne O'Connor	September 28, 2018	901	8.79
179	2	"Meet the New Boss"	Robert Harmon	Ian Biederman	October 5, 2018	902	8.57
180	3	"Mind Games"	John Behring	Brian Burns	October 12, 2018	903	8.31
181	4	"Blackout"	Ralph Hemecker	Kevin Riley & Allie Solomon	October 19, 2018	904	8.46
182	5	"Thicker Than Water"	Jackeline Tejada	Daniel Truly	October 26, 2018	905	7.90
183	6	"Trust"	Alex Zakrzewski	Jack Ciapciak & Kevin Wade	November 2, 2018	906	8.73
184	7	"By Hook or by Crook"	David M. Barrett	Siobhan Byrne O'Connor	November 9, 2018	907	8.97
185	8	"Stirring the Pot"	Robert Harmon	Ian Biederman	November 16, 2018	908	8.63
186	9	"Handcuffs"	Heather Cappiello	Brian Burns	November 30, 2018	909	8.43
187	10	"Authority Figures"	Eric Laneuville	Kevin Riley	December 7, 2018	910	8.90
188	11	"Disrupted"	David M. Barrett	Daniel Truly	January 4, 2019	911	8.60
189	12	"Milestones"	Heather Cappiello	Allie Solomon	January 11, 2019	912	9.05
190	13	"Ripple Effect"	Ralph Hemecker	Siobhan Byrne O'Connor	February 1, 2019	913	9.13
191	14	"My Brother's Keeper"	Doug Aarniokoski	Ian Biederman	February 8, 2019	914	7.62
192	15	"Blues"	David M. Barrett	Brian Burns	February 15, 2019	915	8.93
193	16	"Past Tense"	Rachel Feldman	Daniel Truly	March 8, 2019	916	8.26
194	17	"Two-Faced"	Ralph Hemecker	Kevin Riley	March 15, 2019	917	7.78
195	18	"Rectify"	Robert Harmon	Allie Solomon	April 5, 2019	918	7.90
196	19	"Common Enemies"	David M. Barrett	Siobhan Byrne O'Connor	April 12, 2019	919	8.09
197	20	"Strange Bedfellows"	Dean White	Ian Biederman	April 26, 2019	920	7.78
198	21	"Identity"	John Behring	Daniel Truly	May 3, 2019	921	8.13
199	22	"Something Blue"	David M. Barrett	Brian Burns	May 10, 2019	922	8.48

=== Season 10 (2019–20) ===
No. overall	No. in season	Title	Directed by	Written by	Original release date	Prod. code	U.S. viewers (millions)
200	1	"The Real Deal"	David M. Barrett	Siobhan Byrne O'Connor & Kevin Wade	September 27, 2019	1001	7.85
201	2	"Naughty or Nice"	John Behring	Ian Biederman	October 4, 2019	1002	7.44
202	3	"Behind the Smile"	Ralph Hemecker	Daniel Truly	October 11, 2019	1003	7.64
203	4	"Another Look"	Jackeline Tejada	Brian Burns	October 18, 2019	1004	7.44
204	5	"The Price You Pay"	John Behring	Kevin Riley	October 25, 2019	1005	6.91
205	6	"Glass Houses"	Heather Cappiello	Teleplay by : Allie Solomon & Kevin Wade; Story by : Allie Solomon & Peter D'Antonio	November 1, 2019	1006	7.61
206	7	"Higher Standards"	David M. Barrett	Teleplay by : Siobhan Byrne O'Connor; Story by : Siobhan Byrne O'Connor & James Nuciforo	November 8, 2019	1007	7.39
207	8	"Friends in High Places"	Jennifer Opresnick	Ian Biederman	November 15, 2019	1008	7.51
208	9	"Grave Errors"	Robert Harmon	Daniel Truly	November 22, 2019	1009	7.57
209	10	"Bones to Pick"	David M. Barrett	Brian Burns	December 6, 2019	1010	7.33
210	11	"Careful What You Wish For"	Rachel Feldman	Kevin Riley & Allie Solomon	January 3, 2020	1011	7.68
211	12	"Where the Truth Lies"	David M. Barrett	Siobhan Byrne O'Connor	January 10, 2020	1012	7.91
212	13	"Reckless"	John Behring	Jack Ciapciak	January 31, 2020	1013	7.53
213	14	"The Fog of War"	Doug Aarniokoski	Ian Biederman	February 14, 2020	1014	7.45
214	15	"Vested Interests"	Alex Zakrzewski	Daniel Truly	March 6, 2020	1015	7.31
215	16	"The First 100 Days"	Robert Harmon	Brian Burns	March 13, 2020	1016	8.14
216	17	"The Puzzle Palace"	Dean White	Kevin Riley	April 3, 2020	1017	8.77
217	18	"Hide in Plain Sight"	Doug Aarniokoski	Allie Solomon & Kevin Wade	April 24, 2020	1018	8.02
218	19	"Family Secrets"	David M. Barrett	Siobhan Byrne O'Connor	May 1, 2020	1019	8.52

=== Season 11 (2020–21) ===
No. overall	No. in season	Title	Directed by	Written by	Original release date	Prod. code	U.S. viewers (millions)
219	1	"Triumph Over Trauma"	David Barrett	Siobhan Byrne O'Connor	December 4, 2020	1101	6.44
220	2	"In the Name of the Father"	John Behring	Brian Burns	December 11, 2020	1102	6.38
221	3	"Atonement"	David Barrett	Kevin Riley	December 18, 2020	1103	6.38
222	4	"Redemption"	Alex Chapple	Ian Biederman	January 8, 2021	1104	6.56
223	5	"Spilling Secrets"	John Behring	Daniel Truly	January 22, 2021	1105	6.73
224	6	"The New Normal"	David Barrett	Ian Biederman	February 5, 2021	1106	6.51
225	7	"In Too Deep"	Jennifer Opresnick	Daniel Truly	February 12, 2021	1107	6.52
226	8	"More Than Meets the Eye"	David Barrett	Siobhan Byrne O'Connor & Yasmin Cadet	March 5, 2021	1108	6.30
227	9	"For Whom the Bell Tolls"	Robert Harmon	Brian Burns	March 26, 2021	1109	6.39
228	10	"The Common Good"	David Barrett	Kevin Riley	April 2, 2021	1110	6.21
229	11	"Guardian Angels"	Ralph Hemecker	Ian Biederman & Jack Ciapciak	April 9, 2021	1111	6.35
230	12	"Happy Endings"	Eric Laneuville	Siobhan Byrne O'Connor	April 16, 2021	1112	6.83
231	13	"Fallen Heroes"	David Barrett	Peter D'Antonio & Daniel Truly	April 30, 2021	1113	6.29
232	14	"The New You"	Jackeline Tejada	Brian Burns	May 7, 2021	1114	5.87
233	15	"The End"	Alex Zakrzewski	Siobhan Byrne O'Connor & Kevin Riley	May 14, 2021	1115	6.36
234	16	"Justifies the Means"	David Barrett	Teleplay by : Kevin Wade; Story by : Ian Biederman & Kevin Wade	May 14, 2021	1116	7.07

=== Season 12 (2021–22) ===
No. overall	No. in season	Title	Directed by	Written by	Original release date	Prod. code	U.S. viewers (millions)
235	1	"Hate Is Hate"	David Barrett	Siobhan Byrne O'Connor	October 1, 2021	1201	6.30
236	2	"Times Like These"	Robert Harmon	Brian Burns	October 8, 2021	1202	6.00
237	3	"Protective Instincts"	Jackeline Tejada	Kevin Riley & Yasmine Cadet	October 15, 2021	1203	5.96
238	4	"Good Intentions"	David Barrett	Daniel Truly	October 22, 2021	1204	6.05
239	5	"True Blue"	Ralph Hemecker	Jack Ciapciak	November 5, 2021	1205	6.20
240	6	"Be Smart or Be Dead"	John Behring	Siobhan Byrne O'Connor & Graham Thiel	November 12, 2021	1206	6.10
241	7	"USA Today"	Ralph Hemecker	Brian Burns & Van B. Nguyen	November 19, 2021	1207	5.79
242	8	"Reality Check"	Jennifer Opresnick	Kevin Riley	December 3, 2021	1208	5.81
243	9	"Firewall"	Robert Harmon	Daniel Truly & Peter D'Antonio	December 10, 2021	1209	5.77
244	10	"Old Friends"	Jackeline Tejada	Ian Biederman	January 7, 2022	1210	6.07
245	11	"On the Arm"	Alex Zakrzewski	Kevin Wade & Brian Burns	January 14, 2022	1211	6.44
246	12	"The Reagan Way"	Jackeline Tejada	Siobhan Byrne O'Connor	January 21, 2022	1212	6.27
247	13	"Cold Comfort"	Alex Zakrzewski	Kevin Riley	January 28, 2022	1213	6.10
248	14	"Allegiance"	Donald Thorin Jr.	Yasmine Cadet & Jack Ciapciak	February 25, 2022	1214	6.25
249	15	"Where We Stand"	John Behring	Ian Biederman & Van B. Nguyen	March 4, 2022	1215	5.90
250	16	"Guilt"	Ralph Hemecker	Brian Burns	March 11, 2022	1216	6.14
251	17	"Hidden Motive"	Bridget Moynahan	Daniel Truly	April 1, 2022	1217	5.67
252	18	"Long Lost"	Ralph Hemecker	Kevin Riley & Nicole Abraham	April 8, 2022	1218	5.93
253	19	"Tangled Up in Blue"	Doug Aarniokoski	Teleplay by : Kevin Wade; Story by : Kevin Wade & Graham Thiel	April 29, 2022	1219	5.85
254	20	"Silver Linings"	Ralph Hemecker	Siobhan Byrne O'Connor	May 6, 2022	1220	6.23

=== Season 13 (2022–23) ===
No. overall	No. in season	Title	Directed by	Written by	Original release date	Prod. code	U.S. viewers (millions)
255	1	"Keeping the Faith"	Alex Zakrzewski	Siobhan Byrne O'Connor & Kevin Wade	October 7, 2022	1301	6.40
256	2	"First Blush"	Alex Zakrzewski	Teleplay by : Brian Burns; Story by : Brian Burns and James Nuciforo	October 14, 2022	1303	6.06
257	3	"Ghosted"	Jackeline Tejada	Teleplay by : Daniel Truly; Story by : Daniel Truly & Ashley Zazzarino	October 21, 2022	1302	5.91
258	4	"Life During Wartime"	Doug Aarniokoski	Ian Biederman	October 28, 2022	1304	5.68
259	5	"Homefront"	Alex Zakrzewski	Kevin Riley	November 4, 2022	1305	6.09
260	6	"On Dangerous Ground"	Ralph Hemecker	Jack Ciapciak	November 18, 2022	1306	5.82
261	7	"Heroes"	Doug Aarniokoski	Siobhan Byrne O'Connor	December 2, 2022	1307	5.62
262	8	"Poetic Justice"	Jackeline Tejada	Teleplay by : Brian Burns; Story by : Brian Burns and Van B. Nguyen	December 9, 2022	1308	6.05
263	9	"Nothing Sacred"	Bridget Moynahan	Daniel Truly	January 6, 2023	1309	6.10
264	10	"Fake It 'Til You Make It"	Robert Harmon	Ian Biederman	January 13, 2023	1310	6.12
265	11	"Lost Ones"	Jackeline Tejada	Kevin Riley & Yasmine Cadet	January 20, 2023	1311	6.14
266	12	"The Big Leagues"	Ralph Hemecker	Teleplay by : Brian Burns & Peter D'Antonio; Story by : Brian Burns & Peter D'Antonio & Kevin Wade	February 3, 2023	1312	6.19
267	13	"Past History"	Jackeline Tejada	Siobhan Byrne O'Connor	February 10, 2023	1313	6.25
268	14	"Collision Course"	Ralph Hemecker	Jack Ciapciak & Daniel Truly	March 3, 2023	1314	6.22
269	15	"Close to Home"	Doug Aarniokoski	Ian Biederman & Yasmine Cadet	March 10, 2023	1315	5.74
270	16	"The Naked Truth"	Donald Thorin Jr.	Nicole Abraham & Daniel Truly	March 31, 2023	1316	5.33
271	17	"Smoke & Mirrors"	Jackeline Tejada	Kevin Riley & Van B. Nguyen	April 7, 2023	1317	6.21
272	18	"Family Matters"	Ralph Hemecker	Jack Ciapciak & Peter D'Antonio	April 21, 2023	1318	5.99
273	19	"Fire Drill"	Donald Thorin Jr.	Ian Biederman	May 5, 2023	1319	5.61
274	20	"Irish Exits"	Ralph Hemecker	Kevin Riley	May 12, 2023	1320	5.46
275	21	"Forgive Us Our Trespasses"	Alex Zakrzewski	Siobhan Byrne O'Connor & Kevin Wade	May 19, 2023	1321	5.78

=== Season 14 (2024) ===
No. overall	No. in season	Title	Directed by	Written by	Original release date	Prod. code	U.S. viewers (millions)
Part 1
276	1	"Loyalty"	Alex Zakrzewski	Ian Biederman	February 16, 2024	1401	5.67
277	2	"Dropping Bombs"	Jackeline Tejada	Siobhan Byrne O'Connor	February 23, 2024	1402	5.45
278	3	"Fear No Evil"	Ralph Hemecker	Kevin Riley & Jack Ciapciak	March 1, 2024	1403	5.55
279	4	"Past is Present"	Bridget Moynahan	Daniel Truly	March 15, 2024	1404	5.47
280	5	"Bad Faith"	Robert Harmon	Ian Biederman & Van B. Nguyen	April 5, 2024	1405	4.86
281	6	"Shadowland"	Jackeline Tejada	Yasmine Cadet	April 12, 2024	1406	5.41
282	7	"On the Ropes"	Doug Aarniokoski	Daniel Truly & Peter D'Antonio	April 26, 2024	1407	5.38
283	8	"Wicked Games"	Ralph Hemecker	Kevin Reilly	May 3, 2024	1408	5.16
284	9	"Two of a Kind"	Doug Aarniokoski	Jack Ciapciak	May 10, 2024	1409	5.15
285	10	"The Heart of a Saturday Night"	Ralph Hemecker	Teleplay by : Kevin Wade; Story by : James Nuciforo & Kevin Wade	May 17, 2024	1410	5.25
Part 2
286	11	"Life Sentence"	Jackeline Tejada	Siobhan Byrne O'Connor	October 18, 2024	1411	5.02
287	12	"Without Fear or Favor"	Donald Thorin, Jr.	Ian Biederman	October 25, 2024	1412	4.61
288	13	"Bad to Worse"	Alex Zakrzewski	Tara Garvey & Daniel Truly	November 1, 2024	1413	5.10
289	14	"New York Minute"	Ralph Hemecker	Nicole Abraham & Jack Ciapciak	November 8, 2024	1414	4.85
290	15	"No Good Deed"	Alex Zakrzewski	Peter D'Antonio	November 15, 2024	1415	4.73
291	16	"The Gray Areas"	Doug Aarniokoski	Kevin Riley & Van B. Nguyen	November 22, 2024	1416	5.05
292	17	"Entitlement"	Jackeline Tejada	Yasmine Cadet & Daniel Truly	December 6, 2024	1417	5.36
293	18	"End of Tour"	Alex Zakrzewski	Siobhan Byrne O'Connor & Kevin Wade	December 13, 2024	1418	5.86

== Home video releases ==
Seasons 2 through 6 include DVD audio commentaries by cast members, writers and directors.

Season	Episodes	DVD release dates			
Season	Episodes	Region 1	Region 2	Region 4	Discs
1	22	September 13, 2011	September 19, 2011	September 15, 2011	6
2	22	September 11, 2012	October 15, 2012	October 17, 2012	6
3	23	September 10, 2013	October 13, 2013	March 5, 2014	6
4	22	September 9, 2014	September 8, 2014	January 28, 2015	6
5	22	September 8, 2015	October 12, 2015	March 24, 2016	6
6	22	September 20, 2016	October 17, 2016	October 26, 2016	6
7	22	August 22, 2017	October 16, 2017	October 18, 2017	6
8	22	August 21, 2018	October 15, 2018	December 18, 2018	6
9	22	August 20, 2019	October 21, 2019	October 23, 2019	5
10	19	August 18, 2020	October 19, 2020	TBA	4
11	16	August 31, 2021	October 18, 2021	TBA	4
12	20	August 30, 2022	November 28, 2022	TBA	5
13	21	August 29, 2023	November 27, 2023	TBA	6
