= Enda McCallion =

Irish film director (born 1967)

Enda McCallion (born 22 June 1967 in County Donegal) is an Irish film director. He studied at the Dún Laoghaire College of Art and Design and the Royal College of Art in London, England.

He directed the 2000/2001 Metz alcopop advert "Forrest" featuring the Judderman. In 2001, he directed the "Deep" music video for the band Nine Inch Nails. He also directed the "Epic" advert for the 2006 AIB Ryder Cup. The advert featured a version of "Lux Aeterna" from Requiem for a Dream, adapted by Fiachra Trench.

In 2010, he directed the film Hit and Run for MGM starring Laura Breckenridge and Kevin Corrigan based on a popular urban myth.

His first novel, Bloodshot, was published in 2016.
