= Hit and Run (2009 film) =

- Hit and Run poster
- Directed by: Enda McCallion
- Written by: Diane Doniol-Valcroze; Arthur K. Flam (as Arthur Flam)
- Produced by: Mark Morgan; Andrew Weiner; Braxton Pope; Brent Emery
- Starring: Laura Breckenridge; Kevin Corrigan; Christopher Shand
- Cinematography: Olivier Cocaul
- Edited by: Miklos Wright
- Music by: Matt Messina
- Production companies: Ithaka Entertainment; Maverick Films; Metro-Goldwyn-Mayer
- Distributed by: 20th Century Fox Home Entertainment
- Release date: January 13, 2009
- Running time: 84 minutes
- Country: United States
- Language: English

Hit and Run (also known as Bumper or Hit and Run unrated) is a 2009 horror film directed by Enda McCallion and written by Diane Doniol-Valcroze and Arthur K. Flam (as Arthur Flam). The film tells the story of a young woman who tries to cover up a deadly hit and run accident, only to have the supposedly dead victim come back to terrorize her.

== Plot ==
The film opens as Mary Murdock (Laura Breckenridge), a young student, leaves a lively party at a club in New Jersey one night. She hits a bad bump driving home drunk on a dark road. Later, hearing noises in the garage, she finds a bleeding man, mangled and impaled on her jeep's bumper. Not calling 911, she tries to help, but he suddenly attacks. Panicked, she hits him with a golf club. After that, she buries his body in a shallow grave in the woods off Clover Rd.

The next day, Mary covers up the crime (before her parents return from a weekend trip); she scrubs off the blood but doesn't get the dent fixed (a suspicious cop at the auto shop scares her off, then she detours for her grandma's parrots at airport cargo). Mary starts coming apart. Irrational, she crashes into a tree to camouflage the smaller dent with a bigger dent.

Later the news reveals the missing man is kindergarten teacher Timothy Emser (Kevin Corrigan), bipolar and unstable when he vanished. Strange things occur in Mary's house, making her feel toyed with by someone unseen; she descends into paranoia. Rick (Christopher Shand), her boyfriend, gets involved in the cover-up and goes to retrieve incriminatory evidence (a blanket) off the corpse but is killed, replaced in Emser's grave.

It becomes clear Emser survived. Unhinged, he returns to make Mary relive through the same nightmare she inflicted on him. He stalks Mary in many ways. The parrots squawk strange phrases, which alert Mary. At one point, she falls down the stairs, impaling a screw driver in her thigh. Emser attacks her, by biting and stabbing her, and she passes out. In a reversal, when Mary revives, Emser has strapped her to the bumper with electric cords and Christmas lights and takes her on a sadistic, all-night "revenge drive".

Along the way, after a struggle, Emser kills a gas attendant (who was about to call the cops) by pumping petrol down his throat; the attendant throws up blood after Emser departs. Emser parks back at his own house, leaving Mary trapped in his garage, as she did to him. He reunites with his worried family but is ever more delusional, violent. Soon, Emser stabs his wife Jane in the back with hedge clippers when she accidentally stumbles on and tries to untie Mary.

Emser goes to bury Mary in the woods with Rick's body, after detaching her and the bumper using a blowtorch and welding mask. However, in the grave, Mary is able to maim his eye with a plug from the cords and escapes in the jeep. When Emser blocks her path, Mary revs up and intentionally runs her tormentor over several times. She speeds off in the dark.

The next morning, Mary wakes on the roadside, numb and battered, and drives to a local auto shop. There, the mechanic and passersby ultimately discover, and pull out, Emser's body from under the jeep, where it got snagged. Seeing this, Mary has a mental breakdown, saying "I don't think I need that bumper anymore", laughing as the police sirens close in on her. The film ends moving closer to Emser's bloodied face on the pavement in the early rain, and it appears to be left uncertain whether he is actually dead or not.

Throughout the narrative, a radio DJ called Eddie the Spaz is periodically heard. He is hosting a weekend music marathon called the "Spazathon", which bookends the film.

== Cast ==
Actor/Actress	Character
Laura Breckenridge	Mary Murdock
Kevin Corrigan	Timothy Emser
Christopher Shand	Rick
Megan Anderson	Jane
Michael Gell	Andy
Nitin Adsul	Gas Attendant
Eric Zuckerman	First Street Mechanic
Joe Hansard	Quarantine Dude
Lance Lewman	Mechanic
Rebecca Gebhard	News Anchor
Al Twanmo	Newscaster
Kara Quick	Reporter #1
Katherine Schmoke	Reporter #2
Mary Lechter	Teacher
Robert Cait	Eddie the Spaz

== Background ==
The film is loosely inspired by an urban legend originating in the mid-1980s, a cautionary "scarelore" tale of the perils of drunk driving. It is also loosely based on the 2001 murder of Gregory Glenn Biggs.

== Release ==
MGM and 20th Century Fox Home Entertainment released the film to DVD on January 13, 2009.
