= Southern Belles =

- Film poster
- Directed by: Paul S. Myers; Brennan Shroff
- Written by: Paul S. Myers; Brennan Shroff
- Produced by: Craig Cohen
- Starring: Anna Faris; Laura Breckenridge; Justin Chambers
- Distributed by: The Sundance Channel
- Release date: March 16, 2005
- Running time: 90 minutes
- Country: United States
- Language: English
- Budget: $500,000

Southern Belles is a 2005 comedy film directed by Paul S. Myers and Brennan Shroff. This is a story of two best friends who live in the fictitious small town of Johnson's Mark, Georgia. Dreaming of a fresh start in Atlanta they soon learn it will be very difficult to make their way there on their small town budget. There are many references to the literary history of the State of Georgia including Gone With the Wind.

== Cast ==
- Anna Faris as Belle Scott
- Laura Breckenridge as Bell Granger
- Justin Chambers as Rhett Butler
- Heather Goldenhersh as Margery
- Judah Friedlander as Duane
- Fred Weller as Tracy Hampton
- Zac Gardner as Kevin
- Tammy Arnold as Jane Willard
- Craig Myers as Captain Willard
