= A Christmas Kiss =

2011 film directed by John Stimpson

- Promotional poster, bearing the slogan, "A romance about how one kiss can change everything ..."
- Genre: Romantic comedy
- Written by: Joany Kane
- Directed by: John Stimpson
- Starring: Elisabeth Röhm; Laura Breckenridge; Brendan Fehr
- Theme music composer: Marco D'Ambrosio; Ben Decter
- Country of origin: United States
- Original language: English

Production
- Producers: Mark Donadio; Miriam Marcus
- Cinematography: Brian Crane
- Editor: John Stimpson
- Running time: 96 minutes
- Production companies: Moody Independent; Atmospheric Pictures

Original release
- Network: Ion Television
- Release: December 11, 2011

Related
- A Christmas Kiss II (2014)

A Christmas Kiss is a 2011 American made-for-TV romance film directed by John Stimpson and starring Elisabeth Röhm, Laura Breckenridge and Brendan Fehr. Written by Joany Kane, the film is about an aspiring interior designer who has a chance encounter with a handsome stranger, with whom she shares an impulsive romantic kiss in an elevator. Later she discovers that he is the wealthy socialite boyfriend of her callous and dominating employer. While decorating and preparing his home for an upcoming holiday charity fundraiser, they get to know each other, and soon he must decide which woman holds the key to his future happiness. Filmed on location in Richmond, Virginia, A Christmas Kiss first aired on December 11, 2011 on the Ion Television network.

== Plot ==
Wendy works as a busy assistant to the callous designer Priscilla, but has dreams of becoming an interior designer in her own right. After her friends encourage her to focus on herself, Wendy impulsively kisses a handsome stranger while they are trapped together in an elevator but neglects to learn his name. She is later reunited with the man, but is dismayed to learn that he is her boss's boyfriend Adam and that due to the sparkly makeup she was wearing, doesn't recognize her.

Wendy and Priscilla are hired to decorate Adam's house for an upcoming Christmas fundraiser. After learning about Adam and his grandmother, Wendy creates a theme centered upon Charles Dickens' 1843 novella A Christmas Carol, as it was a book both enjoyed. Her credit is stolen by Priscilla after Adam dismisses the designer's original idea, portraying it as an alternate theme of hers. While working on the decorations Wendy quickly falls in love with Adam, who in turn realizes that he wants to break up with Priscilla due to their differing values.

Priscilla ends up firing Wendy after discovering that she stayed over at Adam's house watching movies, as the two had fallen asleep. She also plants a fake engagement announcement in the newspaper to undermine Adam's plans at breaking up. Priscilla later slips up and reveals that the design was actually Wendy's, which disgusts Adam. The two then go to the local theatre, where he breaks up with Priscilla after being reunited with Wendy. While she is initially reluctant to reconcile with Adam, Wendy and Adam become a couple and the film ends with them becoming engaged.

== Cast ==
- Elisabeth Röhm as Priscilla Hall
- Laura Breckenridge as Wendy Walton
- Brendan Fehr as Adam Hughes
- Jerrika Hinton as Tressa
- Laura Spencer as Caroline
- Mark Joy as Charlie
- Jimmy Jernigan as Doctor
- Vickie Jernigan as State Senator
- Mark DeAngelis as Coachman
- Michael Waters as Carriage Driver
- Steven Ramirez as Caroler (Lip Sync)

== Production ==
A Christmas Kiss was filmed on location in Richmond, Virginia. The Richmond Ballet provided the ballet dancers, and Hundley Carriages provided the horse and carriage. The carriage ride was filmed in Worcester, Massachusetts.

== Soundtrack ==
- "Nutcracker Op71 No2 March" (Tchaikovsky) performed by The City of Prague Philharmonic Orchestra
- "Nutcracker Op71 No14 Dance of the Sugar Plum Fairy" (Tchaikovsky) performed by The City of Prague Philharmonic Orchestra
- "A Wish Comes True Every Day" (Ali Theodore, Jason Gleed, Alana da Fonseca) performed by Debby Ryan
- "This Christmas" (Brian Alex) performed by Brian Alex
- "Christmas is Here" (Flynn) performed by Flynn
- "Deck the Halls" (Traditional) performed by Gracie Van Brunt
- "Jingle Bells" (James Lord Pierpont) performed by Gracie Van Brunt
- "The Holly and the Ivy" (Tim Renwick)
- "Hark the Herald Angels Sing" (Charles Wesley) performed by The Kaz Gamble Carolers
- "We Wish You a Merry Christmas" performed by The Kaz Gamble Carolers
- "O Christmas Tree" (Ernst Anschutz) performed and arranged by Vinx

== Home media ==
The film was released on DVD by Marvista Entertainment on October 16, 2012.

== Reception ==
Common Sense Media gave the movie 3/5 stars, writing that it was "OK for older kids who like their Christmas packages traditional and wrapped up brightly and don't mind a sprinkling of salty language." The Dove Foundation wrote, in a review, that "“A Christmas Kiss” clearly shows that sometimes love is really meant to be."

== Sequel ==
A sequel, A Christmas Kiss II, was released on 2014. The film stars Elisabeth Harnois, Adam Mayfield, Lola Glaudini and Jonathan Bennett. Dove.org rated the film favorably and gave it their "family friendly" seal of approval.

== See also ==
- List of Christmas films
