= The Favor (2006 film) =

- Directed by: Eva S. Aridjis
- Written by: Eva S. Aridjis
- Produced by: Eva S. Aridjis; Howard Gertler; Heather Greene; Lesa Greenfield
- Starring: Frank Wood; Ryan Donowho; Paige Turco; Isidra Vega; Laura Breckenridge; Sterling K. Brown
- Cinematography: Andrij Parekh
- Edited by: Mathilde Bonnefoy
- Music by: Danny Hole
- Distributed by: Dark Night Productions; 7th Art Releasing
- Release date: October 15, 2006
- Running time: 110 minutes
- Country: United States
- Language: English

The Favor is a 2006 drama film written and directed by Eva S. Aridjis. The film is about a photographer living in New Jersey who gets a phone call from a woman who broke his heart 25 years ago. The film was premiered on October 15, 2006, at the Morelia Film Festival in Mexico and opened in Mexico on October 19, 2007. It opened in New York City on May 2, 2008.

== Plot summary ==
Two high school sweethearts, Lawrence (played by Luke Robertson) and Caroline (played by Laura Breckenridge), are about to go off to college, but claim they will stay together nonetheless. 25 years later, Lawrence (played by Frank Wood) is living back in his hometown, Bayonne, New Jersey, and is a photographer who photographs pets, as well as criminals at the local police station. He receives a surprise phone call from Caroline (played by Paige Turco), who has recently come back home in order to care for her sick father and who is divorced and has a troubled teenage son Johnny (played by Ryan Donowho). Caroline and Lawrence go on a date and rekindle their relationship, but shortly afterwards she dies in a freak accident. Johnny's father Harris (played by Aldo Perez) does not want to take care of him, and he will be going into foster care. When Johnny has a seizure at his mother's funeral, Lawrence decides to adopt him. The bulk of the film is about Lawrence and Johnny, and how Lawrence tries to be a father to Johnny while Johnny rejects him. Johnny also has a relationship with a neighborhood girl, Mariana (played by Isidra Vega), and problems with the local drug dealer Carter (played by Jesse Kelly).

== Cast ==
- Frank Wood as Lawrence
- Ryan Donowho as Johnny
- Paige Turco as Caroline
- Isidra Vega as Mariana
- Paul Lazar as Mr. Smith
- Michael Higgins as Mr. Ritter
- Luke Robertson as Young Lawrence
- Laura Breckenridge as Young Caroline
- Wally Dunn as Dr. Charles
- Sterling K. Brown as Policeman #1
- Jesse Kelly as Carter
- Aldo Perez as Harris
- Marceline Hugot as History Teacher
- Aurelia Thierree as Photo Shop Girl
- Richard M. Davidson as Principal Foreman

== Production ==
Howard Gertler was the executive producer for the film. Eva S. Aridjis and Heather Greene served as co-producers. Lesa Greenfield was the line producer. Edwige Geminel was in charge of production design. Danny Hole provided original music for the film as well as art direction. Tere Duncan was the costume designer. The film was shot by Andrij Parekh on 35mm in New Jersey, at locations including Cape May and Bayonne High School. Production of the film began November 5, 2004 and ended December 14, 2004. The animals in the film were provided by Paws for Effect. The soundtrack includes songs from bands such as The Cure, The Troggs, Blondie, Interpol, The Stone Roses, The Cascades, Chris Montez, and Nikki Sudden.

== Critical reception ==
The film received mixed reviews from critics. The review aggregator Rotten Tomatoes reported that 49% of critics gave the film positive reviews, based on 18 reviews. Metacritic reported the film had an average score of 49 out of 100, based on 7 reviews — indicating mixed or average reviews.

Justin Chang of Variety wrote "A pair of beautifully mismatched lead performances elevate a predictable drama to unexpected resonance in The Favor." Chang called it a "tearjerker [that] should travel well on the festival circuit, though its modest aspirations and execution will probably draw more cable than [distributor] attention."

Mark Olsen of The Los Angeles Times wrote that "The Favor is that rare film that at every turn exhibits good taste and a sense of restraint."
