= Forrest (advertisement) =

2000 TV ad for alcopop drink Metz

- Directed by: Enda McCallion
- Produced by: Rob Godbold
- Narrated by: Alicia Suszka Fielder
- Cinematography: Daniel Landlin
- Music by: Srdjan Kurpjel
- Production company: Spectrecom Films
- Distributed by: Bacardi
- Release date: January 2000
- Running time: 1 minute, 13 seconds
- Country: United Kingdom
- Language: English

Forrest is a television advertisement for the alcopop drink, Metz, which aired in the United Kingdom in the year 2000.

== Background ==
Metz, a brand of Bacardi-Martini, aired the advertisement in conjunction with other promotions at the time, such as free samples, two-for-one promos, competitions, and a point-of-sale campaign, in an attempt to not only boost sales of the original Metz drink, but also to promote good sales for the new additions of "Black Metz", a black-coloured schnapps based drink, and "Still Metz", a non-carbonated drink that was blended with citrus essences and spring water.

The reason for these promotions were to encourage sales in the 18- to 24-year-old market, as the Metz team aimed at two key areas that related to that audience and what appealed to said audience.

The first was the condition of "gut-bloating", a condition that occurred as an after effect of binge-drinking overcarbonated beers. This condition was prominently featured in the book "30-Second Beer" by Sophie Atherton, in which it is stated that "[a]nother quality issue is over-carbonation, which can give beer a very fizzy character, as well as creating sensations of prickling and burning. It can also make the drinker feel bloated."

To this end, Metz worked to advertise their alcopops, particularly Still Metz, due to its bases of citrus essence and pure spring water, as drinks which would allow the drinker to enjoy themselves, while also avoiding the potential after effects brought on by binge drinking other overly carbonated beers.

For the second, Metz created an advertisement and a promotional campaign featuring their mascot, "the Judderman", in an attempt to appeal to contemporary youth by offering them something new, something unusual, and ultimately something dangerous and sinister.

This concept, in particular the latter parts of this concept, are more prominently discussed in the book, "Contemporary Gothic", by Catherine Spooner, in which she describes the reasoning behind the usage of these methods as so, "The eponymous Persuaders are sinister figures whose 'subterranean operations' consist of acquiring secret knowledge of the consumer -- often figured as a housewife in a 'hypnoidal trance' in order to manipulate their fears and desires, gaining control over their money and their minds", which can be reinterpreted to mean, that Metz, and others like them, in seeing the traditional way that advertisers operate, and in realizing that these advertisements don't appeal to the current youth, in the same way that the darker, more sinister types of advertisements do, decided to utilize the concepts identified by Catherine Spooner as opposed to those of the traditional advertisers, because of their success and their appeal to the youth as a result.

In regards to the aforementioned concept as a whole, Al Young of HHCL & Partners creative, stated to Gavin Boyter of Campaign Magazine that, "If you're 18 and you have a choice between a safe product and a dangerous one, you'll choose the dangerous one" a statement, which like Spooner's, reflects the aim of the Metz team in attempting to appeal to the youth by diverting away from the traditional type of advertising for products by utilizing both darker and more dangerous, sinister types of advertising as a way to appeal to the current youth at the time.

== Development ==
The selling point for the ad was to portray the Judderman character, and by extension the Metz drink itself, as "beguiling, mysterious and cold", according to Ian Williamson, the art director, and Jonathan Barley, the copywriter.

In addition, they also wanted it to emphasize the "judders", or kick of the drink as it is served cold, hence, emphasis was also placed on "judders" themselves to some degree, such as in the poem that is read during the ad, in the line, "the deliciousness of judders".

To achieve these ends, the Irish director, Enda McCallion, was brought on board the project, due in part to his works with Renault and Citroen Saxo, and also to his more "mischievous sense of humor", as reported by Campaign Magazine.

McCallion would later report to Campaign Magazine, that his inspiration for the commercial came after watching Alice, the 1988 animated film by Jan Švankmajer, and from listening to the "junk opera" of the band, The Tiger Lillies, while recovering from an ear infection in a Parisian hospital.

Once McCallion had a more formalized idea for the advertisement, the ad's crew began shooting in a recently used movie set in Budapest, according to ad creator, Sid McGrath, who described the set as, "...essentially an enchanted forest, ... in the middle of an amazing castle."

The advertisement was shot using Arri cameras, which were modified with hand-cranks in an attempt to replicate the various shutter speeds of the cameras used in films like F.W. Murnau's "Nosferatu".

The dissolve transitions seen in this advertisement were created by the film making technique of double exposure, in which two pieces, or parts of film, are superimposed onto each other to create a new image out of the two.

Accompanying these film making techniques, the Judderman himself, was played by a 6'5" ballet dancer, as, according to McGrath, he was the type of figure that could sort of provide an "eerie, almost floaty movement", just by walking about on screen, which they were looking for as an homage to the way vampires, such as Count Orlok of "Nosferatu" tended to movie in the older Expressionist movies shot in Germany.

The set was designed by Nikos Meletopolous, who provided the practical designs seen in the advertisement's background settings, while Jean-Marie Vives aided in the set creation with the use of digital matte backgrounds, to create a dreamy, surreal world that homaged Gothic fairy tales.

Using animation at London's Glassworks Factory animation studio, McCallion worked to purposely allow the Judderman's shadow to fall on the matte backgrounds created by Vives, in order to "play around with ideas and perspectives", to give the ad a feeling of "order to chaos".

Adding to the storybook feel, McCallion employed Budapest puppet makers to design the marionettes used as the framing device of the advertisement, while Kay Minter designed the costumes for the actors out of wool and silk, incorporating wood and vegetation into the designs.

Narration was done by the half-Polish, half-Czech actress, Alicia Suszka Fielder, who recited the advertisement's accompanying poem, while music was composed by the notable, Srdjan Kurpjel.

== Synopsis ==
The ad begins in a marionette show in which a wooden puppet form of the Judderman, Metz' company mascot, appears from the right side of the stage, accompanied by a musical sting, before creeping away off-screen.

Following his disappearance, the camera zooms in on the moon pictured on the backdrop of the show's stage, before fading in to a scene of a moon on a snowy winter's night.

Once the fade in is complete, the Judderman appears again, in his actual form, from behind a tree in the forest, as the narrator begins to recite the first two lines from the commercial's poem, "Beware the Judderman, my dear, when the moon is fat."

Hiding among the trees in the titular forest, the Judderman stalks an unwary traveler, as the man attempts to travel through the forest alone at night.

Unaware of the Judderman's presence, the traveler only turns his head when he hears the rustling of tree limbs behind him, which are rapidly growing due to the Judderman's presence in the area.

At this point, the narrator continues reciting the next line(s) of the poem, "Sharp of tongue and spindle limbed he is and cunning.", as the Judderman begins to approach the man from his side.

Turning back to his trail, the traveler is caught off guard and frightened by the sudden appearance of the Judderman, who appears right next to him, as the being begins to offer him a bottle of Metz.

Still afraid, but seemingly intrigued by the Judderman's proposition, the man begins to follow him deeper and deeper into the forest, in spite of warning signs appearing all around him, and loses his luggage, which is then stolen by the tree limbs.

At this point, the narrator recites the line(s), "With sweetened talk of schnapps and Metz and the deliciousness of Judders.", as the Judderman continues to lure the traveler through the forest and towards his icy lair.

Following the Judderman into his lair, the traveler notices others around him all drinking and enjoying the same Metz drink that the Judderman is offering him, before reaching for and grabbing the Judderman's drink from him.

As this is going on, the narrator recites the next lines of the poem, "But schnapps though sweet, has teeth, my love, and sharpened ones at that", intending to perhaps inform either the viewer or the traveler of the danger he is in and the mistake he is making in taking the Metz drink from the Judderman.

Unwilling to stop and determined to have the Metz drink, the traveler drinks the Judderman's drink, as the Judderman steps back and watches him slowly transform into a puppet, as a result of him having drunk it.

After his transformation is complete, the camera fades out again and then back fades in on the marionette show from the beginning of the advertisement, showing the Judderman puppet holding the traveler puppet by his strings, imparting the idea to the viewer that the traveler is now under the Judderman's control because he drank the Metz drink he was offered by the being.

As the commercial comes to an end, the narrator reiterates the first two lines of the poem, "Beware the Judderman, my dear, when the moon is fat.", before the tagline appears on screen. At the end, the Metz bottle comes down with the narrator quoting "Judder þýðir Metz og Schnapps" which translates roughly from Icelandic as "Judder means Metz and Schnapps", intending to warn the viewer of the power the advertised Metz drink will have on them.
