= Laura Breckenridge =

American actress (born 1983)

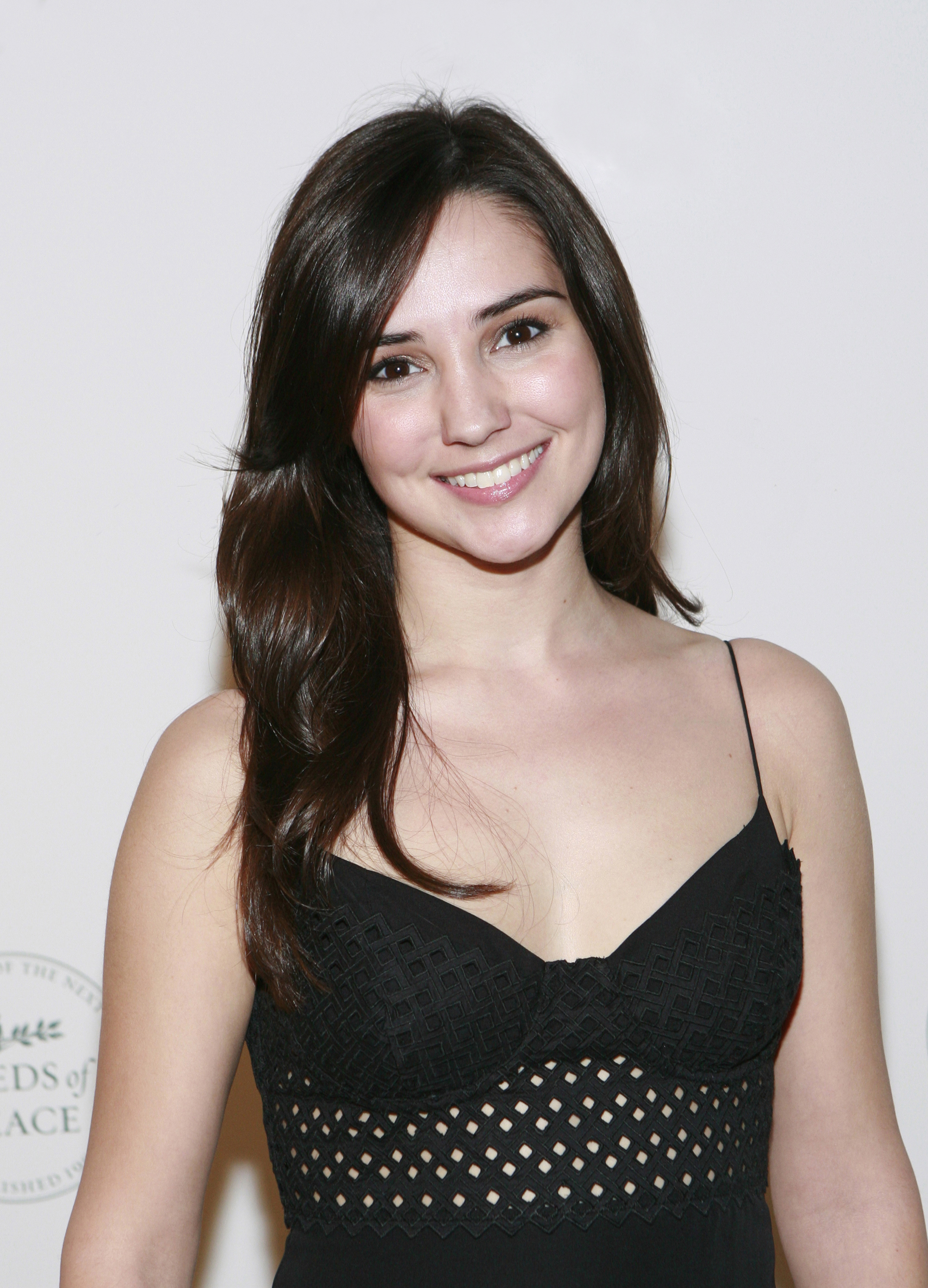
- Breckenridge in 2009
- Born: Laura Marie Breckenridge; August 22, 1983 (age 43); Flourtown, Pennsylvania, U.S.
- Education: Princeton University, B.A. 2010
- Occupation: Actress
- Years active: 1995–present
- Spouse: Benjamin Savage (m. 2013)
- Children: 2

Laura Marie Breckenridge (born August 22, 1983) is an American actress. She is best known for her role as college student Rose Sorelli on the television series Related.

== Early life ==
Breckenridge was born August 22, 1983, in Flourtown, Pennsylvania, to John and Diane Breckenridge.

== Career ==
She trained as a dancer with The Rock School for Dance Education, the School of American Ballet in New York City, and the Royal Ballet in London. As a teenager she began appearing in films and television programs, beginning with a minor role in Went to Coney Island on a Mission from God... Be Back by Five (1998) as the twelve-year-old Gabby. Additional minor TV roles followed in 2001 for The Jersey and Boston Public. She spent her high school years between work and school, making time for a social life in between gigs. She attended Professional Children's School in New York City.

In February 2002, Breckenridge landed a role on Broadway in a revival of Arthur Miller's The Crucible, appearing alongside Laura Linney, Liam Neeson, and Kristen Bell. The production ran for 101 performances from March 7 to June 9. In the fall of 2002, Breckenridge began her studies at Princeton University, soon joining the BodyHype Dance Company and getting involved in the theater scene on campus. In her sophomore year, she took her first break from school to appear in the Off-Broadway play The Moonlight Room.

In 2005, Breckenridge appeared in her first major film role as Bell Granger in Southern Belles. That same year, she made her debut on The WB's Related as college student Rose Sorelli. She would end up starring in nineteen episodes of that television series. In 2006, she played the role of Colins in the film Loving Annabelle, about a Catholic school student who falls in love with her female teacher. Breckenridge also appeared in the films Let Them Chirp Awhile (2007) as Dara, The Favor (2007) as Young Caroline, Beautiful Loser (2008) as Tracy, and Amusement (2008) as Shelby Leds.

In 2008, after a four-year sabbatical from school, she returned to Princeton to complete her studies while continuing her acting career. In 2010, she graduated from Princeton with a Bachelor of Arts degree in Classics, having submitted a senior thesis on "Confronting Medea: Exploring the Duality of the Other".

During these years, Breckenridge appeared in three episodes of the popular television series Gossip Girl (2009), as well as the television series Drop Dead Diva (2010) as Dawn Lucas, and CSI: Crime Scene Investigation as Julie Crenshaw.

In 2011, Breckenridge guest starred on Grey's Anatomy in the role of Julia. Later that year, she starred in the holiday film A Christmas Kiss, which first aired on December 11, 2011, on the Ion Television network.

In 2012, Breckenridge continued her work on television series, including CSI: NY in the episode "Clean Sweep" as Lisa Roberts, The Mob Doctor in the episode "Legacy" as Sara Anderson, and Blue Bloods in the episode "Higher Education" as Dana, a law school friend of Jamie Reagan. In 2013, she again played the role of Dana on Blue Bloods in the episode "Mistaken Identity".

== Filmography ==
=== Film ===
Year	Title	Role	Notes
1998	Went to Coney Island on a Mission from God... Be Back by Five	Gabby (age 12)	
2005	Southern Belles	Bell Granger	
2005	Havoc	Runaway	
2006	Loving Annabelle	Collins	
2007	I Hate Musicals	Melissa	Short
2007	Tres	Camilla, Terca Feira Em Copacabana	Short
2007	Let Them Chirp Awhile	Dara	
2007	The Favor	Young Caroline	
2008	Beautiful Loser	Tracy (teenage)	
2008	Amusement	Shelby Leds	
2009	Hit and Run	Mary Murdock	Video
2010	BoyBand	Samantha Hughes	
2011	A Christmas Kiss	Wendy Walton	TV movie
2012	G. Redford Considers	Ada	Short

=== Television ===
Year	Title	Role	Notes
2000	The Jersey		"The Girlfriend"
2001	Definitely Maybe		"1.1"
2001	Boston Public	Janice	"Chapter 17"
2005–06	Related	Rose Sorelli	Main role
2009	Gossip Girl	Rachel Carr	"You've Got Yale!", "Carnal Knowledge", "The Age of Dissonance"
2010	Drop Dead Diva	Dawn Lucas	"Queen of Mean"
2010	CSI: Crime Scene Investigation	Julie Crenshaw	"Blood Moon"
2011	A Christmas Kiss	Wendy Walton	TV film
2011	Grey's Anatomy	Julia	"Not Responsible"
2012	CSI: NY	Lisa Richards	"Clean Sweep"
2012–13	The Mob Doctor	Sara Anderson	"Legacy", "Resurrection"
2012–13	Blue Bloods	Dana	"Higher Education", "Mistaken Identity"
2013	Bobbington	Kline	"Pilot"
2014	Ambiance Man	Suzy	"Miss Period"
2014	The Michaels	Marcie Schlossberg	TV film
2015	Rizzoli & Isles	Heather	"Love Taps"
2015	Criminal Minds	Nicole Seavers	"'Til Death Do Us Part"
2017	Bull	Erin Howland	"Name Game"
