= Blue Bloods season 3 =

Season of American television series Blue Bloods

Blue Bloods
- Season 3
- Region 1 DVD cover art
- No. of episodes: 23

Release
- Original network: CBS
- Original release: September 28, 2012 – May 10, 2013

Season chronology
- ← Previous; Season 2 Next → Season 4

The third season of Blue Bloods, a police procedural drama series created by Robin Green and Mitchell Burgess, premiered on CBS September 28, 2012. Leonard Goldberg serves as executive producer.

According to TV by the Numbers, committing to a third season of Blue Bloods meant that CBS was all but guaranteed to commit to a fourth season. This was because as a CBS Television Studios production, CBS has a financial incentive to produce at least the minimum number of episodes needed for stripped syndication. On March 27, 2013, CBS made it official by renewing Blue Bloods for a fourth season to begin in the fall of 2013.

== Cast ==
Donnie Wahlberg, Bridget Moynahan, Will Estes and Len Cariou are first credited, with Tom Selleck receiving an "and" billing at the close of the main title sequence. Amy Carlson and Sami Gayle are once again credited as "also starring" within the episodes they appear, whilst Jennifer Esposito entered a dispute with CBS regarding doctor's orders for her to cut back working hours due to her Coeliac disease. Rather than work around her limited schedule, CBS chose to replace her character this season. As such, Esposito only appears in five episodes, receiving "also starring" billing in all of them.

Several guest stars initially replaced Esposito as Danny's temporary partner in story arcs. First up was Megan Ketch as Detective Kate Lansing. Megan Boone, from Law & Order: LA and The Blacklist appeared in a later arc during the season, although her contract stipulated she had the option to remain as a regular, "also starring" member of the cast should a deal not be reached with Esposito before the fourth season. Marisa Ramirez then appeared in the final seven episodes as Danny's partner, Det. Maria Baez, before becoming a regular in Season 4.

=== Main ===
- Tom Selleck as New York City Police Commissioner Francis "Frank" Reagan
- Donnie Wahlberg as Detective 1st Grade Daniel "Danny" Reagan
- Bridget Moynahan as ADA Erin Reagan
- Will Estes as Officer Jamison "Jamie" Reagan
- Len Cariou as New York City Police Commissioner Henry Reagan (Retired)
- Amy Carlson as Linda Reagan
- Sami Gayle as Nicole "Nicky" Reagan-Boyle
- Jennifer Esposito as Detective 1st Grade Jackie Curatola

=== Recurring ===
- Megan Ketch as Detective 1st Grade Kate Lansing
- Marisa Ramirez as Detective 1st Grade Maria Baez
- Robert Clohessy as Sergeant Sidney "Sid" Gormley
- Abigail Hawk as Detective 1st Grade Abigail Baker
- Nicholas Turturro as Sergeant Anthony Renzulli
- Peter Hermann as Jack Boyle
- Ato Essandoh as Reverend Darnell Potter
- Tony Terraciano as Jack Reagan
- Andrew Terraciano as Sean Reagan

== Episodes ==
| No. overall | No. in season | Title | Directed by | Written by | Original release date | Prod. code | U.S. viewers (millions) |
|---|---|---|---|---|---|---|---|
| 45 | 1 | "Family Business" | Alex Chapple | Brian Burns | September 28, 2012 | 302 | 11.22 |
Career criminal Benjamin Walker (Michael Madsen) with a grudge against Danny is released from prison, kidnaps Jackie, and ultimately puts Danny in danger. Jamie is assigned a new partner, the brash, fast-talking Vinny Cruz (Sebastian Sozzi). Elsewhere, Frank counsels a young officer (Corbin Bleu) who is despondent after accidentally shooting an innocent man.
| 46 | 2 | "Domestic Disturbance" | Michael Pressman | Ian Biederman | October 5, 2012 | 301 | 9.77 |
Danny and Jackie investigate an assault call in which a woman named Angela (Lili Mirojnick) changes her story after they arrive, stating she fell down the stairs. Their investigation leads them to Councilman Tony Mancini (Richard Burgi), a friend and former colleague of Frank's. Meanwhile, Danny has concerns about Linda returning to her job at the hospital.
| 47 | 3 | "Old Wounds" | John Polson | Siobhan Byrne-O'Connor | October 12, 2012 | 303 | 10.53 |
Danny and Jackie believe a vigilante is on the loose when two separate shooting victims are both revealed to be members of a four-man group who gang-raped a young woman but were released due to inconclusive evidence. Erin faces her ex-husband Jack Boyle (Peter Hermann) in court and advises him against getting Nicky's hopes up with the news that he may be moving back to New York. Meanwhile, Frank deals with the winner of the "Commissioner for a Day" contest, a young man who is determined to get the police to take a stronger interest in locating his mother's killer. Jack shows up for Nicky’s sweet sixteen party.
| 48 | 4 | "Scorched Earth" | Peter Werner | Dawn DeNoon | October 19, 2012 | 304 | 10.29 |
Danny and Jackie are initially assigned the case of a bride who is murdered in a drive-by gang shooting on her wedding day, but Danny gets pulled off to protect the unpopular dictator of a South American nation who is in town for an operation and believed to be an assassination target. While on patrol, Vinny arrests a young man who proves critical to the drive-by shooting investigation, but Jamie is worried that his partner performed an unjustified stop of the suspect that will jeopardize the case. Danny and Linda celebrate their 16th anniversary.
| 49 | 5 | "Risk and Reward" | Ralph Hemecker | Thomas Kelly | October 26, 2012 | 306 | 11.06 |
Shortly after getting an award for his undercover work on a drug cartel in Malaysia, Intelligence liaison Detective Bobby Mulrow is kidnapped by members of the cartel, who threaten to have him killed if the authorities don't release their kingpin's brother. Frank assigns Danny and Sam Croft to search for Mulrow, which is complicated by his need to give the appearance that they are cooperating with the hostage-takers' demands. In anticipation of his 60th anniversary as a cop, Henry does a ride-along with Jamie and Vinny and seems to side with Vinny when it comes to handling a family restaurant dispute that has resulted in multiple calls. These opinions do not sit well with Jamie.
| 50 | 6 | "Greener Grass" | Martha Mitchell | Daniel Truly | November 2, 2012 | 308 | 11.05 |
When Erin's key witness in the case against a shady doctor, an infamous photographer, is nearly killed in a hit and run, she arranges for Danny to work protection detail to safeguard him. Meanwhile, Jamie and Vinny bust suspects in a drug operation. Elsewhere, Frank confronts Henry about his driving skills and tries to convince his father to hand over his keys, and they turn against each other. Also, Danny and Linda are having money troubles and when Erin's witness offers Danny a high paying job, he and Linda consider it.
| 51 | 7 | "Nightmares" | John Polson | Kevin Wade | November 9, 2012 | 305 | 11.32 |
An investigation into a stabbing death finds Danny and interim partner Detective Kate Lansing face-to-face with a Voodoo community. A man dressed a priest for Halloween is killed by someone dressed as the Haitian Spirit of Death. During all of this, Erin and Nicky take Jack and Sean out for trick-or-treating. Meanwhile, Garrett shares a dark secret with Frank; a woman he had an affair with demands $50,000 or else she'll (wrongfully) file a sexual harassment lawsuit against him. Frank seeks Henry's assistance to get the woman to recant her story. Also, Jamie tries to help an elderly former hockey player (Ken Howard) who has Alzheimer's and continues to enter a building searching for his doctor despite being told that there is no doctor. Curatola reappears in the final scene and cleans out her desk, telling Danny she needs to take a leave of absence due to stress.: Note: This is the final appearance of Jennifer Esposito as Jackie Curatola.
| 52 | 8 | "Higher Education" | Robert Harmon | Ian Biederman | November 30, 2012 | 307 | 11.31 |
Danny and Kate investigate the murder of a college student dealing with drugs on the grounds of a campus, which forces them to work with aggressive narcotics detective Eddie Stone (Dash Mihok). Stone's antics cause the shooting of a cop, and Danny very nearly comes to blows with him. Jamie reconnects with a former college acquaintance Dana (Laura Breckenridge) who is helping the homeless. They meet again when Jamie comes to her aid when she is badly beaten up on the street. Later, he leaves from their dinner-date when she speculates that he joined the police force to avenge the death of his brother, Joe. She apologizes to Jamie and they go out together for a snack. Meanwhile, Erin forbids Nicky from going to a college party with a 19-year-old male and gets angry when Frank won't openly back up her stance in front of Nicky.
| 53 | 9 | "Secrets and Lies" | David M. Barrett | Siobhan Byrne-O'Connor | December 7, 2012 | 309 | 11.17 |
Linda helps Danny and Kate in a case when she overhears a shooting victim in her hospital telling a visiting priest the first name of the responsible party during last rites. Danny visits the priest, but gets no further as the hospital meeting was considered a confidential confession. Meanwhile, Henry is mugged and beaten at an ATM, and Jamie must fight back his rage when he encounters the perpetrator. Not following protocol and leaving his partner in the dark, Jamie pursues the mugger across the rooftops and very nearly lets him drop from the edge instead of pulling him up. As a result, he is suspended for three days, and Frank admonishes him for looking for vengeance instead of justice. Elsewhere, Frank gets a tip from mob attorney and old friend Angelo Gallo (Chazz Palminteri) that leads to several arrests.
| 54 | 10 | "Fathers and Sons" | Michael Pressman | Brian Burns | January 4, 2013 | 310 | 10.18 |
Danny's son Sean suffers a head injury while biking with Erin, Nicky, and Jack. He is taken to the hospital unconscious and the family is told it will take time for him to wake up. The timing couldn't be worse for Danny, as it happens while he is in the midst of investigating a sniper (Paul Anthony Stewart) who is shooting motorists that drive gas guzzlers. His ammunition consists of lead alternatives and he leaves trash from a green market at the crime scene. Danny and Kate track down the head of an environmental movement (Neal Huff), who points the finger at an ex-military sniper he believes committed the crime. Interspersed within the initial investigation, Danny visits Sean in the hospital and prays to his deceased brother Joe to intervene and help Sean recover. Danny leaves and he and Kate find the accused sniper dead from an apparent suicide. Danny notices the man appeared to have shot himself with his right hand, despite it being a recorded fact that he was left-handed. He was hence murdered and Danny comes to the conclusion that the environmental chief set them up. Realizing that his time is up, the environmental chief tries to flee from Danny on his bike, but is hit by an SUV (ironically, the same type of car that the sniper would have targeted) and incurs a broken leg, allowing him to be caught. Back at the hospital, Sean wakes up with Danny and Frank nearby. Danny then visits Joe's grave and says, "Thanks, kiddo."
| 55 | 11 | "Front Page News" | Robert Harmon | Dawn DeNoon | January 11, 2013 | 311 | 11.22 |
Jamie must deal with the emotional consequences of his actions on the job, after he shoots and kills a man posing a potential threat to a park's neighborhood. The fatal shooting was the man's suicide by cop, revealing that he was of unstable mind and hiding a dark secret from his past. In order to deal with the aftermath of the shooting, Jamie must attend a trauma debriefing by NYPD psychologist Dr. Grace Meherin (Annabella Sciorra). Danny investigates the suicide in order to help Jamie overcome his trauma. Meanwhile, Erin questions Mayor Poole on the witness stand regarding an embezzling case involving his campaign consultant. At the family dinner, Frank reveals that Erin would be able to know if the mayor was bluffing if he scratches the back of his head, as Frank has seen this "tell" in poker games with the mayor. The Mayor continuously avoids being questioned on the stand, alerting Erin to the fact that he may not wish to lie under oath. Following the conclusion of the trial with the mayor's employee pleading guilty to the charges, Erin questions Mayor Poole, asking him if he had lied about withholding evidence. To this he replied 'no,' but after walking away scratches his head, revealing that he did lie to Erin. Later, Frank, Danny and Jamie sit around the kitchen table, contemplating the fact that they are all in the 10 percent of the 5 percent of police officers who discharge their weapons that end up killing someone — a group Frank says, 'that no one wishes to be in.'
| 56 | 12 | "Framed" | David M. Barrett | Daniel Truly | January 18, 2013 | 312 | 11.64 |
Linda asks Danny to obtain a chocolate cheesecake for the upcoming Sunday dinner from Wojcik's, a Polish bakery he used to visit as a child. At the precinct, Danny informs Sergeant Gormley that numerous assault victims in a case he and Kate are investigating had been using the same bookie, who was issuing warnings to pay outstanding debts. Kate adds that a black book the bookie uses to record all of his dealings would give them the break they need. Danny asks ADA Saul Ward (Thom Barry) for a search warrant for the black book. After work, Danny arrives at Wojcik's past its closing time, as the bakery's owner (Michael Kostroff) is cleaning the store. Danny reminds the owner of the Reagans' connection to the bakery, and the order gets placed. While Danny is driving home, he is pulled over by a police officer, saying his car matched a description of a vehicle involved in a drug deal. Danny is taken into custody when two kilograms of cocaine are found in the back of his Jeep. At home, Frank tells Linda that it is imperative that the Reagan family stay out of this case, as any involvement may jeopardize both Danny and their reputations. Henry secretly asks Erin's ex-husband Jack (Peter Hermann) to represent Danny in his internal affairs jam. At the precinct, Danny gets interviewed by IAB Investigator Captain Derek Elwood (Nestor Serrano), who doubts his version of events. Jamie confronts Mr. Wojcik, knowing that Danny's car was stopped after leaving there, but Wojcik nervously denies understanding anything. Meanwhile, Danny's off-duty weapon is stolen from his house and matches the ballistics involved in the bookie shooting. Danny initially suspects Kate after seeing her talking to Elwood and learns that she once worked for IAB. Frank asks DCPI Moore to dig into Elwood's background. Garrett infers to Kate that "one of our own" is setting up Danny. After the elusive black book is found, it is discovered that Captain Elwood owed a lot of money to the bookie. Danny is then exonerated from all of the charges, as Kate tells him that she's returning to IAB. At Sunday dinner, Linda asks whether or not Frank helped Danny out in any way. He, Henry and Jamie all humorously reject any involvement.
| 57 | 13 | "Inside Jobs" | Alex Hall | Kevin Wade | February 1, 2013 | 313 | 11.50 |
Danny and his new partner Candice "Mac" McElroy (Megan Boone), an 86th Infantry war veteran, investigate a man being dumped out of a cab after a rat is found gnawing on him. Meanwhile, Erin is asked by society "goddess" Sophia Franza (Mary Elizabeth Mastrantonio) to head a cancer charity during a fund-raiser that is soon overcome with rats. The two instances become linked as Jamie learns the rats were deliberately released by the cab victim, who confesses to have made a deal with Franza. Meanwhile, bigoted radio show host Curtis Swint (Mark Moses) is in town to make a speech, and wishes to meet with Frank to get his support on the First Amendment's freedom of speech issue. Swint condemns New York City's diverse citizens and assumes Frank would be supportive because he is white. He asks Frank to ensure security at his upcoming speech at a Manhattan theater. Frank says he supports Swint's right to speak, but in response, makes sure Swint's security detail is entirely composed of non-white police officers led by a large African American male sergeant.
| 58 | 14 | "Men in Black" | Alex Chapple | Teleplay by : Ish Goldstein & Ian Biederman; Story by : Ish Goldstein | February 8, 2013 | 314 | 11.24 |
Solomon (David Margulies), the Grand Rebbe of the Morganthal family, is on his deathbed. He confides to his friend Henry that he is breaking with Hasidic tradition in asking younger son Levi (Yuval Boirn) to be the head of the family, as Levi is the most ready. Custom states the role should fall to elder son Jacob (Stephen Kunken). However, Levi is fatally stabbed shortly afterwards. Henry asks Danny to solve the case and fellow Hasidic Detective Wolf Landsman (Luke Kirby) assists Danny on the case since the people don't allow outsiders in the community. Levi's widow Rivka (Melissa Errico) offers no clues nor help on the case, as she is protected by Asher Lefko (Darren Goldstein). It is revealed that Levi had a mistress, Karen Waters (Susan Misner) and that Rivka wanted a divorce. Evidence leads Danny to believe Asher is the killer. They arrest Rivka to trick Asher into confessing. Meanwhile, Henry reveals to Frank that he had a brother who had died of leukemia after only 18 months. Frank's parents kept the secret from him all his life, but Frank had learned his brother's name, Peter Christopher, even if he waited for the truth from Henry. Henry then gives Frank a photo of Peter. Also in this episode, the former mayor pays Frank a visit after his spoiled daughter Rebecca and her friend get arrested by Jamie and Vinny for smoking marijuana in the park. Rebecca's disrespectful attitude continues in court (since she believes her father will help her out of it), but he tells the court that she needs to learn to have some respect for the law, and Judge Angioli sentenced her to pay a $500 fine and perform 1000 hours of community service at a rehab center.: Note: Cameo appearance by Fyvush Finkel as a shtreimel maker.
| 59 | 15 | "Warriors" | Oz Scott | Siobhan Byrne-O'Connor | February 15, 2013 | 315 | 10.73 |
Danny investigates the shooting of 10-year-old Devon (Christopher Martinez) in a building filled with drug dealers and gang members. Letitia (Victoria Cartagena), Devon's mother, gives him the name of Tiny Martinez, who later admits the "hit" was intended for Letitia. When she later wonders who would want her dead, Danny asks about Devon's father. She mentions Daryl being angry that he lost custody of Devon but is in prison for manslaughter. Danny learns Daryl had been released a week prior to the shooting. He then receives a call that Daryl has just taken Devon from the hospital. Danny and Sgt. Gormley deduce that father and son are about to leave town by bus. Eventually, Daryl hands the gun and his son over to Danny. Concurrently, Danny's reaction to a 10-year old getting shot lands him in anger management classes. Meanwhile, Garrett and an uncomfortable Frank attend a charity banquet. There, Frank meets Turkish musician Isabelle Nasser (Sheetal Sheth), who informs him that she cannot return to her native country. Isabelle has had sex with an American conductor, thus disgracing her family who will have her killed. Frank is told to turn her over to the State Department and stay out of it. The State Department, citing no hard evidence to support Isabelle's claims, orders that she must return to Turkey. Ultimately, Frank uses his connections to get Isabelle a job with the New York Philharmonic. The work visa allows her to remain in the United States.
| 60 | 16 | "Quid Pro Quo" | Alex Zakrzewski | Brian Burns | February 22, 2013 | 316 | 11.21 |
A basketball game gets ugly as a fight breaks out, forcing Danny to arrest a friend who punched an opposing player for pushing him around and calling him "fat". Jamie later learns the assaulted man, a friend of his from law school, has hired an "ambulance chaser" and instigated the fight in order to get money. Frank is interviewed by a TV reporter who brings up a condemning quote about him that is revealed to have come from a colleague. When Garrett admits to making the statement back before he really knew Frank, he tries to get it edited out even though Frank is okay with it being aired. Erin is approached by Nathan Anderson, who hopes she can solve his murdered daughter Jenny's cold case from 1998. Nathan strongly feels his daughter's boyfriend Richard Roark, a very rich and powerful man, should be the prime suspect. Erin enlists Danny's help. Nathan gives them Jenny's necklace which has blood on it. The blood sample was too small to test in 1998, but Danny states that DNA testing has advanced greatly in the last 15 years and has it tested again. The lab work leads the detectives to Richard's father, Preston. Richard confronts his father, assuming he killed her because he thought Jenny wasn't good enough for his son.
| 61 | 17 | "Protest Too Much" | Larry Teng | Dawn DeNoon | March 8, 2013 | 317 | 10.72 |
Amid protests over the NYPD's new "stop, question and search" policy, Erin and the entire Reagan family are targeted by a protest group's photographer, who is publishing the photos to a website. When a rape victim that Erin is preparing for trial appears in some of the photos, Erin confronts the photographer. Danny and Detective Maria Baez investigate a young "Bonnie and Clyde" type couple who rob a bank and steal an off-duty police officer's gun in the process, but the intrusion of the FBI threatens their progress. Elsewhere, Frank considers getting romantically involved with an ACLU representative named Whitney (Sarah Wynter), who is an acquaintance of Erin's and close to Erin's age.
| 62 | 18 | "No Regrets" | David M. Barrett | Daniel Truly | March 15, 2013 | 318 | 10.41 |
Danny and Maria investigate a string of shooting murders that appear to be random, and try to find a connection. Their investigation leads them to suspect a prosecutor, who is mentor and colleague of Erin's, when it is revealed that all of the shooting victims beat previous murder raps or served very short sentences. Jamie tries to figure out why a young boy ran to him in the street for protection, and discovers the boy comes from a troubled household. Meanwhile, Frank meets up with long-time friend Col. Peter Seabrook, a former astronaut, and learns his friend has not been forthcoming and may have a serious drinking problem as well as being divorced from his wife.
| 63 | 19 | "Loss of Faith" | James Whitmore, Jr. | Seth Pearlman | April 5, 2013 | 319 | 11.00 |
When a Catholic female college student, a former homecoming queen, is found dead and lying in a local cemetery, in a posed position, Danny and Maria investigate possible connections to her Muslim love interest and her decision to convert to Islam. Meanwhile, Jamie, Vinny and Sgt. Renzulli are part of a group that Frank has organized to track down a former NYPD police officer who killed a Miami cop and wounded another, after discovering that the recently dismissed man is directing his deadly anger toward all other NYPD police officers.
| 64 | 20 | "Ends and Means" | John Polson | Ian Biederman | April 12, 2013 | 320 | 10.65 |
Erin's excitement over being named Deputy Trial Bureau Chief is tempered when she learns that the Chief of the Manhattan District Attorney's Trial Bureau Amanda Harris (Amy Morton) who gave her the promotion had ignored video evidence in a previous rape case that might have exonerated the suspect. Danny and Maria witness a shooting in a drug-deal-gone-bad that kills one person and badly wounds another. Danny goes to the hospital needing "30 seconds" to get the name of the shooter from the wounded man as he is being rushed into surgery, but Linda refuses to violate hospital procedure and tells Danny he must wait until the man is out of surgery. After the victim dies on the operating table and the shooter takes another life, Danny appears to blame Linda, leading to a heated argument at home. The shooter, Tommy Banks, is eventually arrested, but not before he fights with Danny, causing considerable injuries. Meanwhile, Jamie helps Sean build a soap box derby car to compete in an annual race, with a grudge against a rival family of FDNY firefighters, the Bonniellos, that goes back four generations at stake. After Frank discovers Henry tinkering with the car, and learns that maybe all of the Reagan victories against the rival family may be tainted, he and Jamie take measures to relevel the playing field.
| 65 | 21 | "Devil's Breath" | Alex Chapple | Siobhan Byrne-O'Connor | April 26, 2013 | 321 | 10.46 |
Danny and Maria investigate the strange case of a man found outside a hotel covered in blood, which turns out to be the blood from his murdered girlfriend. The man has no recollection of the events from the previous night, starting from having a drink in the hotel bar, and his blood work confirms that he was under the influence of a drug called "devil's breath". Concurrently, while off-duty, Officer Peter Grasso, who had just left a retirement party, foils an armed robbery-in-progress without any shots being fired. When Jamie smells alcohol on the officer's breath, he tries to help the man cover up the fact that he had been drinking, but the two are caught by Jamie's commanding officer. Meanwhile, Nicky faces suspension from school when she is found to be organizing a protest against random locker searches, and Erin intervenes. Frank decides to disregard the recommendation to fire Officer Grasso after his hearing, and gives him a 30 day suspension and one year of probation.
| 66 | 22 | "The Bitter End" | Christine Moore | Brian Burns | May 3, 2013 | 322 | 10.02 |
Vinny and Jamie answer a call that leads them to the Bitterman housing project, where Vinny grew up and which the locals call "The Bitter End". A young woman who wants out of gang life commits suicide in front of Jamie and Vinny, killing herself and her infant son. Danny blames himself for her suicide because he had made a promise to her and her sister in the wake of their parents' deaths almost 13 years earlier that he would protect them. Meanwhile, Santana (Kamar de los Reyes), leader of the Los Lordes gang that terrorizes The Bitter End, declares war on the department, later killing Vinny in an ambush attack. Concurrently, Frank butts heads with Erin and the D.A. over their unofficial policy of dropping cases involving residents of the Bitterman project when witnesses choose not to testify. (Part 1 of 2)
| 67 | 23 | "This Way Out" | Peter Werner | Kevin Wade | May 10, 2013 | 323 | 10.30 |
In the aftermath of Vinny's murder, Mayor Poole holds a town hall meeting at the Bitterman Projects. The meeting doesn't go well, with multiple people criticizing the NYPD's failure to provide adequate policing in the projects. When Poole takes the microphone and tries to pacify the crowd, he is shot and critically wounded by Hector, a intellectually disabled resident of the projects. Grace Newhouse takes over as acting mayor while Poole is recovering in the hospital. Newhouse threatens Frank's job unless he cleans up the Bitterman Projects. Jamie believes Hector is being badly treated by the interviewing detectives and/or other police officers, and takes his complaint to Frank. Jamie, using information from Hector's father on how he thinks, is able to get Hector to reveal that the people who gave him the gun were Los Lordes gang members, who told him it was just a toy, and that firing it would be seen as a harmless prank. Nona, Santana's girlfriend is arrested with his drugs, so to try and cover his tracks he orders a hit on her in prison. This attempt fails, and Danny persuades her to testify against him. With the necessary evidence and warrants now in hand, Frank organizes raids on the Bitterman Projects where Santana and over 40 members of the Los Lordes gang are arrested. The season finishes with Linda asking the entire family to take a beach vacation on Long Island, which they all agree to attend. (Part 2 of 2)

== Ratings ==
| No. | Episode | Air date | 18-49 rating | Viewers (million) | Weekly rank | Live+7 18-49 | Live+7 viewers (million) |
|---|---|---|---|---|---|---|---|
| 1 | "Family Business" | September 28, 2012 | 1.5 | 11.22 | #20 | N/A | 14.01 |
| 2 | "Domestic Disturbance" | October 5, 2012 | 1.2 | 9.77 | #19 | 1.8 | 12.91 |
| 3 | "Old Wounds" | October 12, 2012 | 1.4 | 10.53 | #21 | 2.1 | 13.70 |
| 4 | "Scorched Earth" | October 19, 2012 | 1.3 | 10.29 | #18 | N/A | 13.16 |
| 5 | "Risk and Reward" | October 26, 2012 | 1.5 | 11.06 | #18 | N/A | 13.84 |
| 6 | "Greener Grass" | November 2, 2012 | 1.3 | 11.05 | #16 | N/A | 13.51 |
| 7 | "Nightmares" | November 9, 2012 | 1.5 | 11.32 | #11 | N/A | 14.24 |
| 8 | "Higher Education" | November 30, 2012 | 1.5 | 11.31 | #16 | N/A | 14.26 |
| 9 | "Secrets and Lies" | December 7, 2012 | 1.4 | 11.17 | #11 | N/A | 14.11 |
| 10 | "Fathers and Sons" | January 4, 2013 | 1.3 | 10.18 | #10 | 1.9 | 13.29 |
| 11 | "Front Page News" | January 11, 2013 | 1.6 | 11.22 | #11 | N/A | 14.00 |
| 12 | "Framed" | January 18, 2013 | 1.5 | 11.64 | #11 | N/A | 14.57 |
| 13 | "Inside Jobs" | February 1, 2013 | 1.5 | 11.50 | #11 | 2.1 | 14.57 |
| 14 | "Men in Black" | February 8, 2013 | 1.5 | 11.24 | #11 | 2.1 | 14.29 |
| 15 | "Warriors" | February 15, 2013 | 1.4 | 10.73 | #8 | N/A | 13.71 |
| 16 | "Quid Pro Quo" | February 22, 2013 | 1.4 | 11.21 | #12 | N/A | 13.95 |
| 17 | "Protest Too Much" | March 8, 2013 | 1.4 | 10.72 | #10 | 2.1 | 13.79 |
| 18 | "No Regrets" | March 15, 2013 | 1.4 | 10.41 | #11 | N/A | 13.34 |
| 19 | "Loss of Faith" | April 5, 2013 | 1.5 | 10.99 | #15 | N/A | 14.39 |
| 20 | "Ends and Means" | April 12, 2013 | 1.3 | 10.65 | #15 | 2.0 | 13.68 |
| 21 | "Devil's Breath" | April 26, 2013 | 1.3 | 10.46 | #14 | 2.0 | 13.35 |
| 22 | "The Bitter End" | May 3, 2013 | 1.3 | 10.02 | #15 | N/A | 12.78 |
| 23 | "This Way Out" | May 10, 2013 | 1.1 | 10.30 | #13 | 1.8 | 13.34 |
