= Amusement (film) =

- Theatrical release poster
- Directed by: John Simpson
- Written by: Jake Wade Wall
- Produced by: Neal Edelstein; Mike Macari
- Starring: Keir O'Donnell; Katheryn Winnick; Laura Breckenridge; Jessica Lucas
- Cinematography: Mark Garrett
- Edited by: Chris Willingham; David Handman
- Music by: Marco Beltrami
- Production companies: Picturehouse; New Line Cinema
- Distributed by: Warner Home Video
- Release dates: October 9, 2008 (Thailand); January 20, 2009 (United States)
- Running time: 85 minutes
- Country: United States
- Language: English
- Budget: $10 million
- Box office: $170,255

Amusement is a 2008 American anthology slasher film directed by John Simpson and starring Keir O'Donnell, Katheryn Winnick, Laura Breckenridge and Jessica Lucas. The film went direct-to-video in January 2009. It was the last film to be distributed by the original Picturehouse before their closure in 2008.

== Plot ==
=== Prologue ===
The film opens with yearbook photos of three girls, Tabitha Wright, Shelby Leds and Lisa Swan. Each girl proves to have great potential, as their senior superlatives respectively describe them as "Most Likely to be Famous", "Most Likely to Succeed" and "Most Likely to Shine." As well as the girls, the prologue introduces photos of an unnamed boy, and clippings of a psychological profile which describe him as "extremely dangerous."

=== Shelby ===
While on the highway, Shelby and her boyfriend Rob Alerbe pull over for gas, joined by a semi-truck and a Jeep. At the gas station, Shelby sees a frightened woman in the truck's back window, though Rob does not see her and tells Shelby that the trucker said he was driving alone. On the road, the same woman jumps from the truck and lands on their car. The truck continues onward as Shelby, Rob, and the driver of the Jeep stop to help the woman. Rob then drives after the truck to get its plates, but fails to catch up and returns only to discover the Jeep driver injured, and Shelby and the woman missing. The Jeep driver says the trucker took them, and they take the Jeep to an old, isolated house. The Jeep driver goes alone to the front door, where he overhears the trucker talking on the phone, claiming he is the woman's father and that he was taking her to a rehabilitation facility for a drug addiction. Meanwhile, in the Jeep, Rob discovers Shelby and the woman under a tarp in the backseat, bound and gagged. The Jeep driver kills the trucker when he goes out and then approaches the Jeep. Rob locks the door and tries to drive away, only to discover that the keys are missing. The Jeep driver then breaks open the window with his sledgehammer and kills Rob.

=== Tabitha ===
Elsewhere, Tabitha is spending the night at her aunt's house to babysit her cousins, Max and Danny. She finds out that their babysitter, June, had already left, though she was supposed to wait for Tabitha to arrive before leaving. Later that evening, a man claiming to be June's boyfriend, Owen, arrives to look for her, because she missed cheerleading practice. He is dressed in a raincoat that obscures his face. He leaves when Tabitha tells him she does not know where June is. While exploring the house, Tabitha finds the guest bedroom decorated with clown toys, and becomes particularly scared of a life-sized clown doll sitting on a rocking chair. She later talks with her aunt about the life-sized doll, but is told that the family has no such a doll. Tabitha and the boys are then attacked by the clown who attempts to break into the boys' room. Tabitha helps the boys escape before hiding in the shed. Inside, she opens the closet and finds June's corpse. The clown enters the room, his laughter similar to the Jeep driver's.

=== Lisa ===
Sometime earlier, Lisa Swan and her boyfriend Dan begin searching for her roommate Cat, who had disappeared during a party the night before. They go to an old hotel where Cat said she would be staying. Lisa tries to get in, but the caretaker, a man whose face is covered by a face mask, refuses to let her in. She convinces Dan to pose as a health inspector and look inside. After letting him in, the caretaker shows Dan a Victrola music box and encourages him to play it, claiming that at the end he would get a "surprise". Dan does so, and at the end of the song, a knife flies out of the speaker, stabbing him in the eye. Unable to get in contact with Dan, Lisa sneaks into the house and meets an apparently deaf man, who leads her to a room filled with beds that have dead bodies stuffed into the mattresses. Lisa finds Cat stuffed alive in one mattress, but as she attempts to free Cat, the deaf man attacks her, revealing himself to be the killer.

=== The Briar Hills Connection ===
In a police interrogation room, Tabitha is revealed to be alive and in shock. When she does not answer the interrogator's questions, he leaves her alone. Tabitha then reminisces about her childhood, where she, Shelby, and Lisa were once all friends at Briar Hills Elementary School. After they were tasked to design miniature sets inside shoeboxes that can be viewed through peepholes, a male classmate - the unnamed poor boy from the prologue - demanded to see their work before showing his to Tabitha; it was of a rat chained up and its skin pulled back to reveal its organs. It becomes clear that the boy is insane. Tabitha is then interrogated by a therapist who asks her about Shelby and Lisa. When Tabitha says that they were all friends at Briar Hills Elementary, but have not seen each other for years, the therapist remembers a patient she once had who was from Briar Hills. Then, she comes to a realization and informs Tabitha that Lisa and Shelby are also here, before leaving to find a phone that works. Tabitha wanders out after her and discovers that she is not in a police station. She finds the therapist dead and sees the police interrogator, who was the killer all along, approaching.

Tabitha flees to the basement, where she finds herself trapped between two glass walls. Beyond either side, she finds Shelby and Lisa, bound and gagged and their skin pulled back similar to the rat in the boy's shoebox. The killer initially taunts them, but then reveals that the two are unharmed, and that their opened skin is just a trick. Just as the man is about to kill Shelby, Tabitha pretends to laugh, prompting him to open the glass wall and approach her. Tabitha then stabs him in the neck with a scalpel she had grabbed and unties her friends. As they try to escape, Lisa and Shelby are killed, while Tabitha climbs a ladder that leads to a barn shed. She hides in a room with props used to kidnap the three women. The killer surprises her as he looks through a peephole, and reveals that she is in the back of a truck, which is by the same old house where Rob died. After he drives a short distance, the truck stalls. Tabitha takes hold a spiked weapon and, when he returns to look through the peephole again, stabs him through the face, killing him.

Tabitha restarts the truck and drives away, narrating about how she and her friends had laughed at the killer when they were young, thinking that he was a joke. After he was sent away, they had forgotten all about him, but he never forgot them. She then remarks that even though it was all over, she still cannot get his laugh out of her head.

== Cast ==
- Keir O'Donnell as The Laugh
  - Eyad Kurd-Misto as young the Laugh
- Katheryn Winnick as Tabitha "Tabby" Wright
  - Karley Scott Collins as young Tabitha
- Laura Breckenridge as Shelby Leds
  - Jadin Gould as young Shelby
- Jessica Lucas as Lisa Swan
  - Alisha Boe as young Lisa
- Tad Hilgenbrink as Rob Alerbe
- Reid Scott as Dan
- Rena Owen as Psychiatrist
- Kevin Gage as Tryton
- Brennan Bailey as Danny
- Preston Bailey as Max
- Shauna Duggins as Woman In Truck
- Fernanda Dorogi as Cat

== Production ==
The film was produced by Macari/Edelstein, New Line Cinema and Picturehouse Entertainment. New Line purchased the film in 2005 and attached Bernard Rose to direct, with production to begin a year later.

== Release ==
Amusement was originally slated to release in theaters in January 2008, but was pushed back to April 25 and then again to September 12. It was pushed back once more to December 26, 2008, but Warner Bros. ultimately decided to release it direct-to-video on January 20, 2009. It was released on DVD in Australia on February 5, 2009 and on March 23, 2009 in the United Kingdom.

== Reception ==
Bloody-Disgusting.com, who viewed an early screening of the film, called it "disastrous". Andrew Smith from Popcorn Pictures.com awarded Amusement a score of two out of ten. In his review, Smith noted that although the film had high production values and was reasonably acted, its incomprehensible script and incompetent characters were behind the film's poor quality. Sarah Law from GorePress.com criticised the film's bland direction, lack of scares, incoherent story, and dreadful script.
