= Srdjan Kurpjel =

Srdjan Kurpjel (born 1971 in Sarajevo), is a composer and re-recording mixer for film and television. Srdjan began playing piano when he was 4 years old at the class of Neda Stankovic. He arranged the score for Kuduz aged only 15, and composed the score for Praznik u Sarajevu (1991). Subsequently forming an association with the composer Goran Bregovic, he worked as orchestrator, programmer and arranger on Arizona Dream (1993), and the Palme d'Or winning Underground (1995) and many more. He left his birthplace in 1991 and moved to London from where he heads his own post production facility house Zound. www.zound.com His TV credits as composer include Judderman Metz, Guinness, United Airlines, Audi, MTV News, Christopher Reid's Poem Song of Lunch with Emma Thomson and Alan Rickman, Messiah V for BBC, The End of the Line, The Long Walk to Finchley (2008), Transit (2005), The Naked Pilgrim (2003) and many more. Other Sound Design Credits and Mixing include Around the World in 80 days, Tristan & Isolde, This Must be the Place with Sean Penn, The Disappearance of Alice Creed with Gemma Arterton, Heartless with Jim Sturgess, Skellig with Tim Roth, etc..
