= Blue Bloods season 4 =

Season of American television series Blue Bloods

Blue Bloods
- Season 4
- Region 1 DVD cover art
- No. of episodes: 22

Release
- Original network: CBS
- Original release: September 27, 2013 – May 9, 2014

Season chronology
- ← Previous; Season 3 Next → Season 5

The fourth season of Blue Bloods, a police procedural drama series created by Robin Green and Mitchell Burgess, premiered on CBS September 27, 2013. Leonard Goldberg serves as executive producer.

According to TV by the Numbers, CBS was all but guaranteed to commit to a fourth season. This is because as a CBS Television Studios production, CBS has a financial incentive to produce at least the minimum number of episodes needed for stripped syndication. On March 27, 2013, CBS made it official by renewing Blue Bloods for a fourth season.

== Cast ==
Donnie Wahlberg, Bridget Moynahan, Will Estes and Len Cariou are first credited, with Tom Selleck receiving an "and" billing at the close of the main title sequence. Amy Carlson and Sami Gayle are once again credited as "also starring" within the episodes they appear. Jennifer Esposito, who had entered a dispute with CBS during season 3 production regarding doctor's orders for her to cut back working hours because of her Coeliac disease, was not brought back for season 4 as Danny's partner Jackie Curatola. Marisa Ramirez, who appeared in the final seven episodes of season 3 as Danny's partner Det. Maria Baez, was retained as a full-time cast member for season 4, and she receives an "also starring" billing.

Vanessa Ray appears this season as Jamie's partner Edit "Eddie" Janko, replacing Sebastian Sozzi, whose character Vinny Cruz was killed off near the end of season 3. Though the actress appears regularly, she receives a "special guest star" billing. Also appearing regularly and receiving "special guest star" billing are Gregory Jbara as Deputy Commissioner of Public Information Garrett Moore, and John Ventimiglia as Chief of Department Dino Arbogast.

=== Main ===
- Tom Selleck as New York City Police Commissioner Francis "Frank" Reagan
- Donnie Wahlberg as Detective 1st Grade Daniel "Danny" Reagan
- Bridget Moynahan as ADA Erin Reagan
- Will Estes as Officer Jamison "Jamie" Reagan
- Len Cariou as New York City Police Commissioner Henry Reagan (Retired)
- Amy Carlson as Linda Reagan
- Sami Gayle as Nicole "Nicky" Reagan-Boyle
- Marisa Ramirez as Detective 1st Grade Maria Baez

=== Recurring ===
- Abigail Hawk as Detective 1st Grade Abigail Baker
- Vanessa Ray as Officer Edit "Eddie" Janko
- Gregory Jbara as Deputy Commissioner of Public Information Garrett Moore
- John Ventimiglia as Chief of Department Dino Arbogast
- Robert Clohessy as Sergeant Sidney "Sid" Gormley
- Nicholas Turturro as Sergeant Anthony Renzulli
- Peter Hermann as Jack Boyle
- Bebe Neuwirth as Kelly Peterson
- Ato Essandoh as Reverend Darnell Potter
- Tony Terraciano as Jack Reagan
- Andrew Terraciano as Sean Regan

== Episodes ==
| No. overall | No. in season | Title | Directed by | Written by | Original release date | Prod. code | U.S. viewers (millions) |
|---|---|---|---|---|---|---|---|
| 68 | 1 | "Unwritten Rules" | David M. Barrett | Ian Biederman | September 27, 2013 | 401 | 11.70 |
When a robber flees after a jewelry store heist, Jamie and his newly assigned partner Eddie Janko (Vanessa Ray) arrive on the scene just in time to hear a gunshot that severely wounds officer Lori Collins. Shortly afterwards, Collins succumbs to her injuries. The suspect escapes through a nearby park. Danny and Maria are assigned to the case, and Danny is certain that a man named Angelo Reed (Malcolm Goodwin) who was witnessed at both the jewelry store and in the park, is the shooter. When an elderly eyewitness struggles to identify Angelo in a photo lineup, Danny "helps" her, and she later picks him out of a live lineup. Erin is skeptical that the woman’s testimony will survive cross-examination in court, and is forced to let Angelo go. This gets her in hot water with her family, her boss and most of the NYPD rank-and-file. Officers thus stage a "blue flu" situation by refusing to appear at other court cases involving Erin’s office, forcing Frank to order an end to the blue flu. In the end, Erin and Danny join forces to stage a situation wherein Angelo can confess and get a deal for only seven years in prison. They then trick him into declining the deal (with Angelo unaware that his confession is still binding), and they book him for Murder One.
| 69 | 2 | "The City That Never Sleeps" | John Behring | Kevin Wade | October 4, 2013 | 402 | 11.37 |
Danny is shadowed by Hollywood action film star Russell Burke (Marc Blucas), who is trying to learn about NYPD detective work for an upcoming movie role. Danny also has to protect the actor's secret when Burke gets knifed in the city late at night. Frank begins making random visits to officers' beats and precinct houses as a way to get closer to his patrols, and learns that a precinct lieutenant nearing his retirement has been a consistent no-show at work. However, the lieutenant has a good reason; his wife is on her deathbed suffering from ALS, and he has been working another job so he could pay her medical bills and stay home with her more often. Elsewhere, Jamie and Eddie are frustrated by having to respond to multiple calls from a woman (Ali Wentworth), who complains that a male tenant in a building across her street frequently exercises with no clothes on and his blinds open. Having had enough after a while, Jamie brings the man into her apartment, and the two have drinks, to his and Eddie's shock and amusement.
| 70 | 3 | "To Protect and Serve" | Peter Werner | Siobhan Byrne-O'Connor | October 11, 2013 | 403 | 10.56 |
A murder in a park is witnessed by a 13-year-old boy, and the victim is his father. The shooter he describes turns out to be a man named Raoul Delgado (Armando Riesco), who was convicted of murder five years prior but completely disappeared without a trace. It turns out Delgado has been working as an informant for the Department of Homeland Security, whose representatives ask Frank to tell the NYPD to back off. Erin lets Danny know he can still pursue a murderer in his jurisdiction, and he brings in Delgado. At his arraignment, with Erin's ex-husband Jack representing him, Delgado takes a security officer's gun, locks down the courtroom, and holds several people hostage. Frank is informed of the situation while going up against Reverend Darnell Potter (Ato Essandoh) on a radio broadcast about the use of city security cameras. In a heated struggle, he shoots Erin in the shoulder, then makes his demands and says he will only talk to Danny. Danny is able to convince Delgado that he will have free passage to the airport to board a plane to the Dominican Republic, and he is able to lure him outside, but Delgado is holding a gun to an injured Erin. An old Reagan family secret helps Danny free Erin and shoot her captor. Jack later visits Erin with flowers and reveals he regrets never telling her how much she has meant to him, leading to a passionate kiss. Elsewhere, Jamie and Eddie respond to a car accident that injures a mother and her young son. The boy asks Jamie to accompany him to the hospital, and as a result, Jamie gets suspended after he disobeys a direct order from a new lieutenant, who wanted him to stay and prepare the accident report at the precinct. Frank refuses to use his influence to change the situation.
| 71 | 4 | "The Truth About Lying" | Robert Duncan McNeill | Brian Burns | October 18, 2013 | 404 | 10.56 |
Frank is forced to come to terms with newly appointed NYPD Inspector-General Kelly Peterson (Bebe Neuwirth), who immediately targets Jamie's new partner, Eddie, after she gives false information to the District Attorney regarding her and Jamie's collaring of a phone snatcher. Jamie and Peterson are perplexed when Eddie continues to tell the same story despite two attempts to recant, until Frank demonstrates how Eddie may actually believe she is telling the truth. Meanwhile, a homeless man is recorded by a subway camera apparently pushing a young woman in front of an oncoming train. Danny and Maria find that there may be more to this case than originally thought, and it is revealed that her brother sent threatening texts to her upon finding out she was in a relationship with a female classmate, and the girl intended on committing suicide as a result.
| 72 | 5 | "Lost and Found" | Alex Chapple | Daniel Truly | October 25, 2013 | 405 | 11.27 |
While eating breakfast, Erin and Nicky notice an 8-year-old girl looking scared. After she leaves with a man presumed to be her father, they see she has written "help me" on the back of a placemat, and Erin calls in Danny to investigate. It turns out the girl's parents, who are travel agents, had been threatened by the man who is holding the girl for ransom. The man only wants to arrange tickets for two family members to travel from Croatia to America, but there are complications because the two people are thought to be connected to a Croatian mob. Danny and Baez have two cops pose as Croatian men, but the kidnapper sees through the scheme. Danny is able to free the girl before pursuing the criminal, who is accidentally hit by a truck and killed upon impact. Jamie and Eddie are working undercover detail at a jewelry store that has had a number of incidents, and are present when a jilted groom steals a security guard's gun and holds hostages when the store says they cannot give him a cash refund for a custom ring. Jamie convinces the man, Grady, to free the other hostages. He complies, not realizing Jamie is a cop, and Jamie makes the arrest. He asks Erin to give Grady the benefit of the doubt, as he had no prior record, but Grady hangs himself in his holding cell, devastating Jamie. Meanwhile, Dino informs Frank that a police chaplain who provided spiritual guidance after 9/11 has had four recent DWI incidents covered up by other police officers.
| 73 | 6 | "Growing Boys" | Eric Laneuville | Willie Reale | November 1, 2013 | 406 | 11.01 |
As part of an NYPD intervention program for first-time offenders, Jamie mentors a young man named Tomás from the Bitterman Projects who is approached by two gang members trying to bring him back into the life. When the two chase after Tomas and Jamie pursues, one of the gang members is struck and paralyzed by a car. A civil suit is brought against Jamie and the NYPD for negligence, and Tomás is pressured to "forget" that he heard Jamie identify himself as a police officer while pursuing. Meanwhile, an old high school flame of Danny's named Marianne Romano (Charisma Carpenter) calls him for support after her fiance, ex-NFL star Joe Frye (Stink Fisher), had struck her. When the woman backs off on charging Frye, Danny consults another detective who has been trying to nail Frye for dealing illegal steroids out of his gym. Realizing that Frye has discovered male undercover cops trying to become members of the gym, they send in Maria to close the deal and get Frye arrested.
| 74 | 7 | "Drawing Dead" | Ralph Hemecker | Ian Biederman | November 8, 2013 | 407 | 10.97 |
When the body of a Wall Street broker is found dead with no indication of a struggle or theft, Danny and Maria turn their investigation to an art dealer named Teiri Damiri (Haaz Sleiman) who also runs a high-stakes poker game that the broker had been attending. A former narcotics officer named Gary Heller (Frank Whaley) informs Danny that Damiri uses Russian mob muscle to enforce gambling debts. Heller ultimately gets drawn into the investigation despite objections, as Danny says he needs Gary to get Damiri's "black book" of poker clients. Heller reveals he already knows of a Reagan family member who is in the book, causing Danny to confront Henry. Meanwhile, Jamie and Eddie are on the scene of a gang shootout when a fellow officer shoots a 14-year-old in the back. Officer Montero (Elliot Villar) insists he saw the teen with a gun, though no gun was found near the body. When Erin looks into sealed files on the boy, she finds previous weapons charges. Meanwhile, Frank butts heads with Mayor Poole on how to handle the situation and avoid a full-scale riot in the neighborhood.
| 75 | 8 | "Justice Served" | David M. Barrett | Siobhan Byrne-O'Connor | November 15, 2013 | 408 | 11.79 |
Angelo Gallo (Chazz Palminteri), Frank's childhood friend and a mob lawyer, is shot moments after the two dine together. When it is revealed that the hit followed the lawyer resigning his position as the legal representative to one mob boss who had taken out a hit on a witness in his upcoming trial, Frank must figure out to help the hospitalized Gallo without making him a further target. Danny has jury duty and is the only juror who doesn't see enough evidence to convict an 18-year-old man of murdering a young woman. When a mistrial is declared and the jury is dismissed, Danny and Maria continue to work the case as detectives to try and clear the young man. Meanwhile, Eddie's date sexually assaults her, but she is reluctant to press charges for fear of how her fellow officers will treat her; instead, she trails him to his place to get even, but Jamie's persistent attempts to help (which initially enrage Eddie) lead to the officers making the arrest while the perp is out on a date with another woman. Eddie then walks into the men's locker room to thank Jamie for having her back.
| 76 | 9 | "Bad Blood" | Robert Harmon | Daniel Truly | November 22, 2013 | 409 | 11.90 |
When a restaurant employee is fatally stabbed in alley, a suspect seen on a security camera turns out to be Maria's drug-addicted brother, Javi (Kirk Acevedo). It turns out Javi was the intended target of his former dealer, and the restaurant employee was simply in the way, so Javi agrees to help Maria and Danny collar the dealer. Elsewhere, a police dog is accused of attacking an 8-year-old boy in a lawsuit levied against the NYPD, and Frank goes to great lengths to prove the dog's innocence and save him from being put down. Also, at a funeral for a former cop and friend of Henry's who has died of cancer, the deceased man's daughter approaches Henry with suspicions that her mother may have committed euthanasia.
| 77 | 10 | "Mistaken Identity" | David Solomon | Diana Son & Ian Biederman | December 13, 2013 | 410 | 10.94 |
A mosque is bombed twice, the second time with casualties, and a witness says she spotted a man dressed like a Muslim throwing the first bomb. An officer mistakenly profiles a Sikh after a sketch is released, and the Sikh punches him. Frank finds himself opposing the actions of each. Danny and Maria's investigation of the bombing ultimately leads them to a recently unemployed Muslim named Bahir, whom they find has blamed Allah for abandoning him. His next target appears to be the annual Muslim parade. Meanwhile, Jamie's old law school flame, Dana, is in town for a bar association dinner and asks Jamie to be her date. Soon after, Dana confronts Jamie over whether he has feelings for Eddie.
| 78 | 11 | "Ties That Bind" | Christine Moore | Brian Burns | December 20, 2013 | 411 | 10.52 |
The return of Danny's childhood friend Mickey (Tom Cavanagh) to the New York area is less than friendly when Danny learns he has connections to a Florida mob looking to expand their operations into New York City. After Danny collars his friend, his attention turns to keeping him and his family alive. Meanwhile, an officer is shot and Frank learns that the incident could have been prevented were it not for a recent judge's decision to suspend the NYPD's controversial "stop, question and frisk" policy.
| 79 | 12 | "The Bogeyman" | David M. Barrett | Kevin Wade and Benjamin Cummings & Orson Cummings | January 10, 2014 | 412 | 12.68 |
A deadly new form of heroin has hit the streets of New York. When two young people overdose at a party that Nicky is attending, she finds a package that identifies the product as "Bogeyman". After dozens more OD victims hit area hospitals, Frank butts heads with Inspector General Peterson over his proposal that the City of New York buy up all of the new product in the name of public health. A young woman who scored the heroin for the people at Nicky's party is pinned down by Danny and gives him the name of her dealer. Danny and Maria find the dealer has committed suicide on his own product, but his associates from a group called DSS are unaware of his death, helping the detectives make the collar. Meanwhile, Eddie tries to help a young runaway who has stolen a purse, realizing the girl reminds her of herself.
| 80 | 13 | "Unfinished Business" | Alex Chapple | Siobhan Byrne-O'Connor | January 17, 2014 | 413 | 12.62 |
Betty Lowe (Karen Allen) interrupts a press conference Frank is holding to ask him to find her daughter Michelle's killer; despite the fact that a serial killer is serving time for her daughter's murder, in addition to the murders of three other young women, Ms. Lowe is convinced that her daughter knew her killer. Both Frank and Erin are reluctant to reopen the case, fearing it will jeopardize the other three convictions, until a witness in the Lowe murder indicates that the detective in charge coerced him to pick a certain photo out of a lineup. Meanwhile, Danny and Maria are trying to find an Army veteran who beat up his wife and kidnapped his son. Danny suspects the soldier has PTSD, and the case brings back painful memories of his own time as a Marine in Iraq. Note: Nominated for an Edgar Award.
| 81 | 14 | "Manhattan Queens" | Donnie Wahlberg | Willie Reale | January 31, 2014 | 414 | 12.93 |
Danny and Maria work the case of a murdered woman whose body is found discarded in a wooded area, but the body turns out to be that of a drag queen. After learning that the victim is a Yale alum, the detectives find a connection through a posh golf club. Erin is abducted while jogging, and finds that the abduction was set up by a dying woman whose son, Timothy Cooper, is in jail for a crime she swears he did not commit. Meanwhile, at the annual police chiefs symposium in town, Frank's secretary, Detective Abigail Baker is verbally harassed by a Suffolk County deputy chief who has asked her out several times without success. Later, he turns his attention to humiliating the department around her.
| 82 | 15 | "Open Secrets" | Eric Laneuville | Ian Biederman | February 28, 2014 | 415 | 11.96 |
After a schoolgirl named Jenna is abducted and the case is assigned to Danny and Maria, Danny is visited by the father of a girl abducted over seven years ago from the same school and in a similar manner. That case, also assigned to Danny at the time, is still unsolved with the girl's whereabouts unknown. Ultimately, Danny finds both girls in the basement of the school janitor. Frank runs afoul of the FBI, Inspector Peterson and even Garrett, after an agent in the NYPD's International Liaison Program is accused by the Metropolitan Police Service of tampering with a crime scene in a London tube station bombing threat. Frank refuses to give any information about the program, even should he be subpoenaed, claiming it will compromise the integrity of the program. Meanwhile, Erin deals with an arrogant expert witness (Greg Germann) while prosecuting a woman with bipolar disorder who ran down and killed a parking garage attendant with her car. At home, Erin also deals with Nicky's increasingly physical relationship with a classmate.
| 83 | 16 | "Insult to Injury" | David M. Barrett | Teleplay by : Daniel Truly; Story by : Daniel Truly & Andrew Raab | March 7, 2014 | 416 | 12.03 |
A young woman whose parents were killed by a drunk driver in 2009 (while she was in the back seat) calls the precinct after seeing that the perpetrator is out of prison and back drinking in his favorite bar. She vows to kill the man and then kill herself, and Danny has to do all he can to keep her on the phone and delay her actions until they can locate her. Jamie gets a phone number from an attractive courier while on patrol with Eddie, but later finds the young woman gave him a fake number and is working for a counterfeiter. Rather than arrest her, he does the job of a detective and has her lead him to her boss, before reconsidering and turning the case over to the proper people. Elsewhere, Frank has to replace Linda as a chaperone for Sean's class field trip to a museum, and he tries to convince the head chaperone (Annie Wersching) to be less rigid.
| 84 | 17 | "Knockout Game" | Robert Harmon | Brian Burns | March 14, 2014 | 417 | 11.68 |
Three young men playing the "knockout game" hit their next innocent victim, a pregnant woman, while she is walking home with her husband. The woman is okay after a hospital stay, but loses her baby. A known drug dealer becomes the prime suspect for the person who took the swing, and when he ends up dead in an alley, Danny sees evidence that the woman's husband played vigilante. Frank asks Garrett to convince news outlets to sign agreements that they will no longer publicize knockout game incidents. Meanwhile, Jack Boyle wants to tell Nicky that he and Erin are "back together", but Erin doesn't think they are doing anything more than casual dating.
| 85 | 18 | "Righting Wrongs" | Alex Zakrzewski | Siobhan Byrne-O'Connor | April 4, 2014 | 418 | 11.69 |
Erin has a bad encounter with a man (Holt McCallany) on a speed dating event, and later finds he's a defense attorney opposing her on a case. Danny and Baez investigate the death of a doctor's wife who underwent secret plastic surgery, and the two discover a case of medical malpractice and infidelity. Frank orders Jamie to look into the old case of Michelle Lowe's murder (see episode 4.13), and instructs Jamie to tell no one. Eddie quickly realizes Jamie is working on something else without her, and she gets upset by his silence. Frank says he's chosen Jamie because he has the instincts to make a good detective, then tells Garrett he's afraid to recommend his son's promotion because it would look like nepotism. Meanwhile, Frank clashes with the D.A., who insists the right man was convicted of the Lowe murder.
| 86 | 19 | "Secret Arrangements" | Tawnia McKiernan | Teleplay by : Willie Reale & Sinead Daly; Story by : Sinead Daly | April 11, 2014 | 419 | 11.05 |
Danny comes under investigation by the District Attorney's office for possible violations of suspects' civil rights because his record of obtaining confessions is significantly higher than the norm. Erin informs Frank of this off-the-record; Frank then meets with Sergeant Gormley to discuss Danny's work record and begins his own private off-the-books review of Danny's cases. Danny is able to coax this information from his superior officer, which leads to a wedge between father and son. Meanwhile, Danny and Baez investigate the murder of a college professor, who was found to have patronized an online college student "scholarship fund" that acted as a front for a sugar daddy introduction service. Eddie goes on a date with Jamie's old buddy from Harvard, and she in turn sets Jamie up with her high school friend so they can double-date. But at the end of the night, it is Jamie and Eddie that share a kiss, leading to some awkwardness at work the following day. To remove the awkward atmosphere, they blow the event off on the drinks they had and agree it is to never happen again.
| 87 | 20 | "Custody Battle" | Alex Chapple | Ian Biederman | April 25, 2014 | 420 | 11.05 |
Jamie and Eddie are first on the scene as a father, Christopher Collins, argues with his ex-girlfriend about being able to see his daughter. Backup arrives, and the man becomes more belligerent, finally being arrested for disorderly conduct. At the precinct, the arresting officer, Randy Cutter, is attacked by the detainee in a restroom, and other officers arrive to find Collins dead. Cutter is accused of using excessive force, which appears to be confirmed when the coroner's report reveals Collins was choked. After a press conference, Frank is swarmed by reporters, one of whom informs him that Erin has been assigned to prosecute Cutter, and asking if Frank thinks his daughter can be objective. Frank firmly assures the reporter that Erin can, but acts less convinced when talking with Erin directly. Ultimately, Frank finds through Cutter's former boss that the officer had another incident of excessive force in his past, while Erin gets additional information about the most recent incident from Cutter's partner Kara Walsh. Although the grand jury refuses to press charges, Frank fires Cutter for breaking NYPD protocol. Meanwhile, Jamie tries to convince Eddie to visit her father in prison.
| 88 | 21 | "Above and Beyond" | Greg Beeman | Daniel Truly | May 2, 2014 | 421 | 11.59 |
Steve Tomlin, a detective from Danny's precinct, is killed while undercover investigating a drug ring headed by Santo Castillo. Matters get complicated when Gormley and Danny open Tomlin's locker and find it empty, leading to two possible scenarios: Castillo has a mole in the precinct, or someone from the precinct is covering for Tomlin. Meanwhile, one of Nicky's former classmates named Tyler is walking around a bad area of town, and he approaches Erin asking for help. After Erin recognizes him, however, he flees. Erin tells Nicky that she'll handle the issue through child services, but Nicky goes to Jamie for help in locating Tyler.
| 89 | 22 | "Exiles" | David M. Barrett | Kevin Wade | May 9, 2014 | 422 | 11.78 |
Danny runs afoul of two former NYPD detectives now working for the DA's office, as they investigate a woman who committed suicide by jumping from an apartment balcony. The woman is found to have been convicted for promoting prostitution in Atlantic City, but made a deal to be part of a sting operation. The detectives goad Danny into a confrontation and then file a complaint, getting him put on modified assignment. But Danny continues to work the case off the books, while Erin works it from a different angle, both finding evidence of a cover-up. Ultimately, people very close to Frank and Erin are found to be involved. Elsewhere, Jamie and Eddie try to help a plain young woman who wants to marry a handsome Syrian national to keep him in the country, as her father is convinced she is being used and tries to prevent the marriage. Meanwhile, Inspector Peterson tells Frank she will be stepping down from her position, stating she has become too close to him personally to remain professionally objective.

== Ratings ==
| No. | Episode | Air date | 18–49 rating | Viewers (millions) | Weekly rank | Live+7 18-49 | Live+7 viewers (millions) |
|---|---|---|---|---|---|---|---|
| 1 | "Unwritten Rules" | September 27, 2013 | 1.7 | 11.70 | #14 | N/A | 15.27 |
| 2 | "The City That Never Sleeps" | October 4, 2013 | 1.4 | 11.37 | #14 | 2.1 | 14.83 |
| 3 | "To Protect and Serve" | October 11, 2013 | 1.4 | 10.56 | #15 | N/A | 14.12 |
| 4 | "The Truth About Lying" | October 18, 2013 | 1.3 | 10.56 | #16 | N/A | 14.09 |
| 5 | "Lost and Found" | October 25, 2013 | 1.3 | 11.27 | #15 | N/A | 14.65 |
| 6 | "Growing Boys" | November 1, 2013 | 1.2 | 11.01 | #12 | 1.9 | 14.51 |
| 7 | "Drawing Dead" | November 8, 2013 | 1.3 | 10.97 | #13 | 2.1 | 15.03 |
| 8 | "Justice Served" | November 15, 2013 | 1.4 | 11.79 | #11 | N/A | 15.31 |
| 9 | "Bad Blood" | November 22, 2013 | 1.5 | 11.90 | #11 | N/A | 15.65 |
| 10 | "Mistaken Identity" | December 13, 2013 | 1.2 | 10.94 | #9 | 2.0 | 14.91 |
| 11 | "Ties That Bind" | December 20, 2013 | 1.2 | 10.52 | #10 | 2.0 | 14.37 |
| 12 | "The Boogeyman" | January 10, 2014 | 1.5 | 12.68 | #8 | N/A | 16.09 |
| 13 | "Unfinished Business" | January 17, 2014 | 1.4 | 12.62 | #7 | N/A | 16.50 |
| 14 | "Manhattan Queens" | January 31, 2014 | 1.6 | 12.93 | #7 | 2.3 | 16.71 |
| 15 | "Open Secrets" | February 28, 2014 | 1.4 | 11.96 | #10 | N/A | 15.92 |
| 16 | "Insult to Injury" | March 7, 2014 | 1.4 | 12.03 | #7 | N/A | 15.91 |
| 17 | "Knockout Game" | March 14, 2014 | 1.4 | 11.68 | #4 | N/A | 15.09 |
| 18 | "Righting Wrongs" | April 4, 2014 | 1.5 | 11.69 | #9 | N/A | 15.66 |
| 19 | "Secret Arrangements" | April 11, 2014 | 1.4 | 11.05 | #9 | 2.2 | 14.79 |
| 20 | "Custody Battle" | April 25, 2014 | 1.4 | 11.05 | #6 | 2.1 | 14.81 |
| 21 | "Above and Beyond" | May 2, 2014 | 1.5 | 11.59 | #5 | N/A | 15.08 |
| 22 | "Exiles" | May 9, 2014 | 1.4 | 11.78 | #5 | N/A | 15.15 |
