= Brian Burns (screenwriter) =

American screenwriter and producer

- Born: Long Island, New York, United States
- Occupations: Screenwriter, producer
- Years active: 1998–present
- Spouse: Kelly Turlington
- Children: 2

Brian Burns is an American screenwriter and producer.

== Career ==
After graduating from college, Burns moved to Washington, D.C., to pursue a career in political journalism. He served as a copy writer and Segment Producer while covering Capitol Hill and the Clinton White House for The Fox Morning News at the Washington, D.C., affiliate WTTG. Burns then wrote and produced the popular political roundtable discussion, Off the Record, which aired as part of The Fox Morning News.

Burns then returned to New York City, where he made the transition from political journalism to Hollywood screenwriter. Along with his brother, he created That's Life and The Fighting Fitzgeralds, which starred Brian Dennehy and Connie Britton.

In 2002, Brian wrote and directed You Stupid Man, starring David Krumholtz, Milla Jovovich, William Baldwin, and Denise Richards.

Burns spent the next several years in Los Angeles while serving as a writer and Supervising Producer on the HBO hit series Entourage, for which he wrote several episodes, including the fan favorite, "Return of the King", colloquially known as "The Yom Kippur Episode". Burns received two Emmy nominations and multiple Writers Guild of America Award nominations for his work on Entourage.

He then returned to New York to serve as Executive Producer of the popular CBS police procedural Blue Bloods, starring Tom Selleck. Burns has been with show since its inception, has written over 30 episodes, and was nominated for the prestigious Humanitas Award for his Blue Bloods episode titled "The Job", that centered on the events of 9/11.

In 2015 he sold a script for a police procedural titled "The 40-Year-Old Rookie" to CBS, which did not end up being produced.

Burns wrote Daddy's Home (2015), a Paramount Pictures comedy starring Will Ferrell and Mark Wahlberg. The film was said to be loosely based on Burns's experience upon becoming a stepfather.

Burns wrote The Fight Before Christmas - a comedic screenplay - which is being produced by Matt Alvarez and Broad Green Pictures.

== Personal life ==
Brian Burns and Edward Burns are brothers. They are each married to a Turlington sister. Brian is married to Kelly Turlington Burns. His brother is married to supermodel Christy Turlington Burns.
