= Iman Le Caire =

Egyptian actress and LGBT rights activist

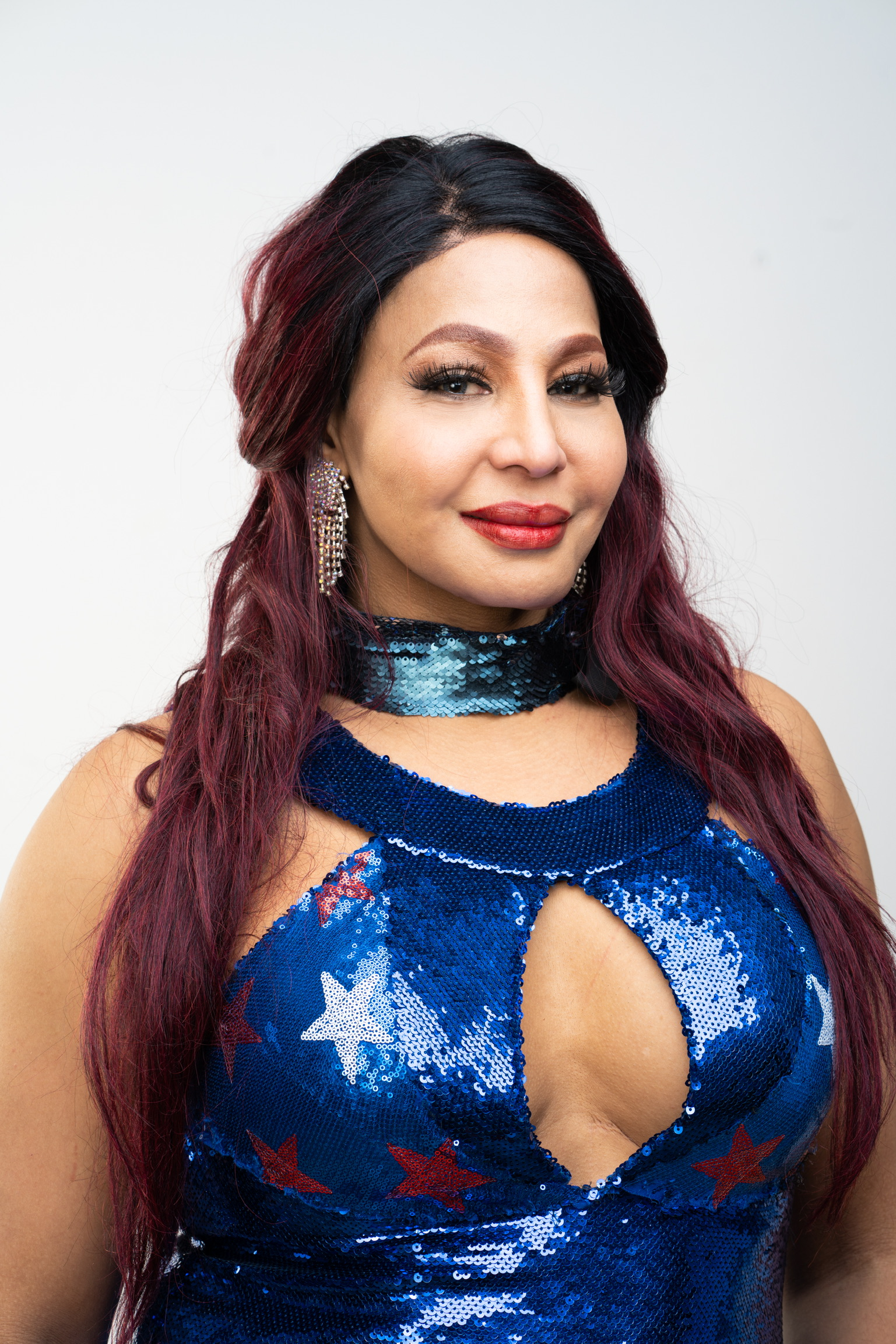
- Born: Egypt
- Occupations: Dancer; choreographer; actress; activist

Iman Le Caire (Arabic: إيمان لوكير) is an Egyptian dancer, choreographer, actress and LGBT rights activist based in New York City.

== Biography ==
Le Caire was a dancer and choreographer at the Cairo Opera House when she had to flee Egypt to avoid being persecuted for belonging to the LGBT community. In 2008, she fled to the United States, where she was granted political asylum. She lives in New York City and works there as an artist, dancer and actress. Her activism has made her a representative of the city's LGBT communities, as well as Fire Island Pines and Cherry Grove.

In 2017, Le Caire appeared in Zolita's music video Fight Like a Girl and in 2021 portrayed the character Layla in The Shuroo Process, written and directed by Emrhys Cooper.

The murder of George Floyd in May 2020 and the suicide of Sarah Hegazi, a lesbian who had been jailed for displaying a rainbow flag in a concert denouncing Egypt's ruthless crackdown on LGBT rights, urged Le Caire to participate more actively in advocating for the rights of the LGBT community.

During the COVID-19 pandemic, Le Caire helped a large number of transgender people flee their countries of origin, where they were persecuted. Finally, she joined the TransEmigrate Association, which helps transgender people trying to move to safer countries, of which she is the manager of Arab relations and a member of the board. In 2021, she founded the sister organization Trans Asylias, which helps transgender people seek asylum.

== Awards and recognition ==
In 2021, Le Caire was listed as one of the BBC 100 Women of the year.
