= Tomarchio =

Tomarchio (pronounced [toˈmarkjo]) is an Italian surname from Catania derived from the Ancient Greek tourmárchēs (τουρμάρχης), i.e. the leader of a turma in the Byzantine Empire. Notable people with the surname include:

- Bridgetta Tomarchio (born 1978), American actress and model
- Filippo Tomarchio, founder of Italian beverage company Sibat Tomarchio
- John Tomarchio, character in the television series Jericho
