= FilmHounds =

British monthly film magazine

VultureHound
- Cover of March 2019 issue of Vulture Hound Featuring Dwayne Johnson
- Editor-In-Chief: Gavin Spoors
- Former editors: David Garlick
- Frequency: Monthly
- Founder: David Garlick
- First issue: 1 March 2011
- Country: United Kingdom
- Based in: London
- Language: English
- Website: vulturehound.co.uk

FilmHounds is a British monthly magazine that is focused on popular culture, entertainment and professional wrestling. Previously known as VultureHound, the site was founded in 2011 as an entertainment website, and launched its first magazine in 2014. Since its foundation, the Editor-in-Chief was David Garlick until 2025; Gavin Spoors has become the Editor-in-Chief since March 2025.

== History ==
Vulture Hound was founded in 2011 and the first magazine came out on 1 March 2014. The publication currently has three paid full-time employees and has about 50 paid freelance journalists.

In addition to the website and magazine, Vulture Hound has two podcasts: Breaking Glass, a retrospective on the musical career of David Bowie and SteelChair Shoot, covering professional wrestling.

In 2016 the magazine was featured on the website for the 2016 film, Till We Meet Again for its review of the film.

In 2020, the Magazine transitioned to become FilmHounds to concentrate particularly on cinema and film production.
