= Jensen Ackles =

American actor and musician (born 1978)

- Ackles in 2026
- Born: Jensen Ross Ackles; March 1, 1978 (age 48); Dallas, Texas, U.S.
- Occupations: Actor; musician
- Years active: 1996–present
- Spouse: Danneel Harris (m. 2010)
- Children: 3
- Musical career
- Genres: Americana; southern rock; blues rock; country
- Instrument: Vocals
- Member of: Radio Company

Jensen Ross Ackles (born March 1, 1978) is an American actor and musician. He gained recognition for his portrayal of Dean Winchester in The WB/CW dark fantasy drama series Supernatural (2005–2020) and appearing in television series such as NBC's Days of Our Lives as Eric Brady which earned him several Daytime Emmy Award nominations. He has also portrayed Ben / Soldier Boy in the satirical superhero series The Boys (2022–2026), a role he will reprise in its prequel, Vought Rising (2027).

He also portrayed twin super soldiers Ben/X5-493 and Alec/X5-494 in Fox's Dark Angel and Jason Teague in The WB/CW's Smallville. He also starred as the lead in the box office success My Bloody Valentine 3D. As a voice actor, he provided the voices of Jason Todd in the animated film Batman: Under the Red Hood, and Bruce Wayne / Batman in Batman: The Long Halloween, Legion Of Super-Heroes, and Justice League: Warworld.

As a musician, Ackles is one half of the rock band Radio Company, formed in 2018 alongside Steve Carlson.

== Early life ==
Ackles was born in Dallas, the son of Donna Joan (born Shaffer) and Alan Roger Ackles, an actor. He grew up in Richardson and attended Lloyd V. Berkner High School. After graduating in 1996, he moved to Los Angeles to begin his acting career.

== Career ==
=== Acting ===
After modeling on and off since the age of four, Ackles began to concentrate on an acting career in 1996. He appeared in several guest roles on Mr. Rhodes, Sweet Valley High and Cybill before joining the cast of the NBC soap opera Days of Our Lives as Eric Brady in 1997. He won a 1998 Soap Opera Digest Award for Best Male Newcomer and went on to be nominated three times (in 1998, 1999 and 2000) for a Daytime Emmy Award for Outstanding Younger Actor in a Drama Series for his work on Days of our Lives.

Ackles left Days of our Lives in 2000 and went on to appear in the mini-series Blonde, about the life of Marilyn Monroe. He also auditioned for the role of the young Clark Kent on Smallville, a role offered to actor Tom Welling instead. Next he appeared in a guest role on the James Cameron television series Dark Angel on Fox in 2001 as serial killer Ben/X5-493, the brother of main character Max/X5-452 (played by Jessica Alba), and returned to the show as a series regular in the second season as Ben's sane clone, Alec/X5-494. He remained with the show until its cancellation in 2002.

Ackles worked steadily throughout 2003. He joined the cast of The WB's hit show Dawson's Creek during its final season, playing CJ, Jen Lindley's lover. Afterward, Ackles filmed several episodes of the unaired series Still Life for Fox before it was abruptly dropped. He also had a small role in the 2004 short film The Plight of Clownana. Ackles was the producer's first choice to play Eliza Dushku's love interest on the second season of Tru Calling; Ackles however, turned down the role, which was then offered to Eric Christian Olsen and the character's name was changed to "Jensen" because the producers liked Ackles' name. Ackles returned to Vancouver (where Dark Angel was filmed) in 2004 to become a regular on Smallville playing the assistant football coach Jason Teague, who was also the newest romantic interest for Lana Lang (played by Kristin Kreuk). He also had a lead role in the 2005 film Devour in which Ackles' father, Alan Ackles, also had a role playing the father of Ackles' character, Jake Gray.

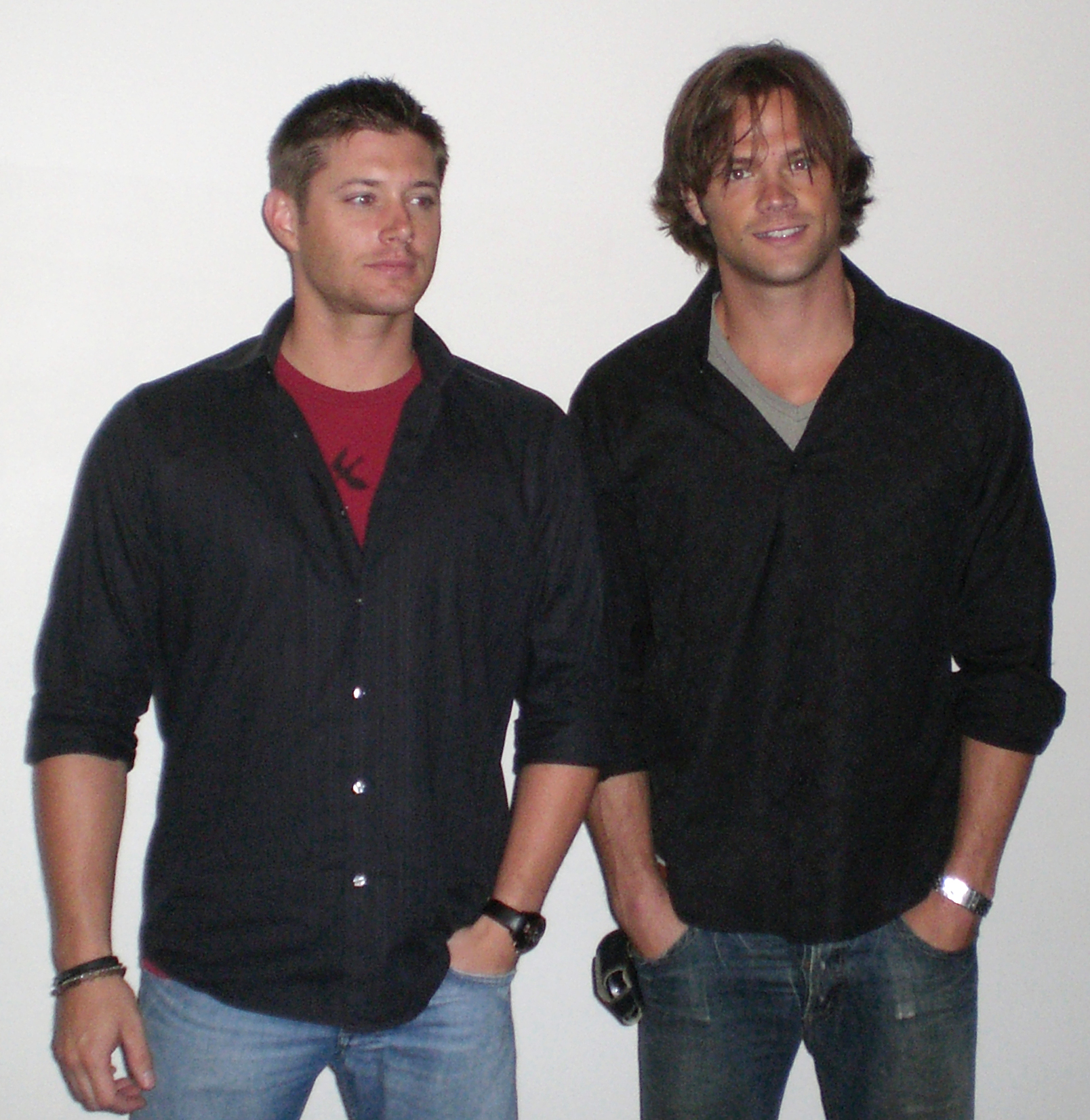
Ackles (left) with his Supernatural co-star Jared Padalecki in 2008

In 2005, Ackles joined the cast of the WB show horror/action series Supernatural where he starred as Dean Winchester. Dean and his brother Sam (Jared Padalecki) drive throughout the United States hunting paranormal predators, fighting demons and angels, and exploring other fantasy and horror genre elements. The show ended after fifteen seasons, making it the longest-running North American fantasy series in history.

In the summer of 2007, Ackles took on the role of Priestly in the independent comedy Ten Inch Hero. The film began hitting the film festival circuit in early 2007 and Ackles received high praise for his comedic timing in the role. In February 2009, the film was released on DVD exclusively by Blockbuster Home Video. He also appeared on stage from June 5–10, 2007 with Lou Diamond Phillips in A Few Good Men at Casa Mañana Theatre in Fort Worth, Texas as Lt. Daniel Kaffee. Ackles received strong praise for his work in this role, which was also his professional theatre debut.

In the summer of 2008, Ackles was cast in the remake of the cult film My Bloody Valentine 3D, which opened nationwide on January 16, 2009.

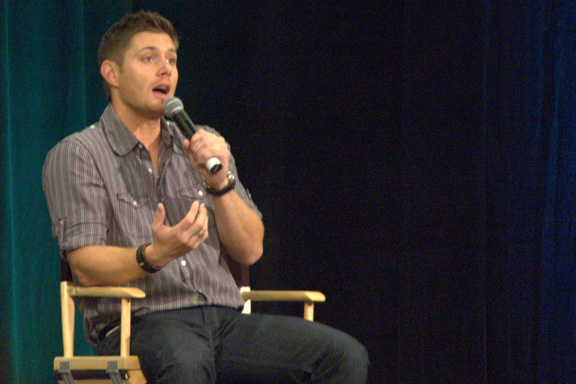
Ackles in 2009

In summer of 2010, as part of the DC Universe Animated Original Movies franchise, Ackles provided the voice for the Red Hood (Jason Todd) in the animated film, Batman: Under The Red Hood, which was released to DVD and Blu-ray on July 27. In summer of 2021, Ackles voiced the role of Batman (Bruce Wayne) for the two-part adaptation of Batman: The Long Halloween. He voiced the role again in February 2023 in Legion of Super-Heroes and Justice League: Warworld.

On October 22, 2010, Disney Interactive Studios announced he would be voicing a character named Gibson in the video game Tron: Evolution which was released on December 7, 2010.

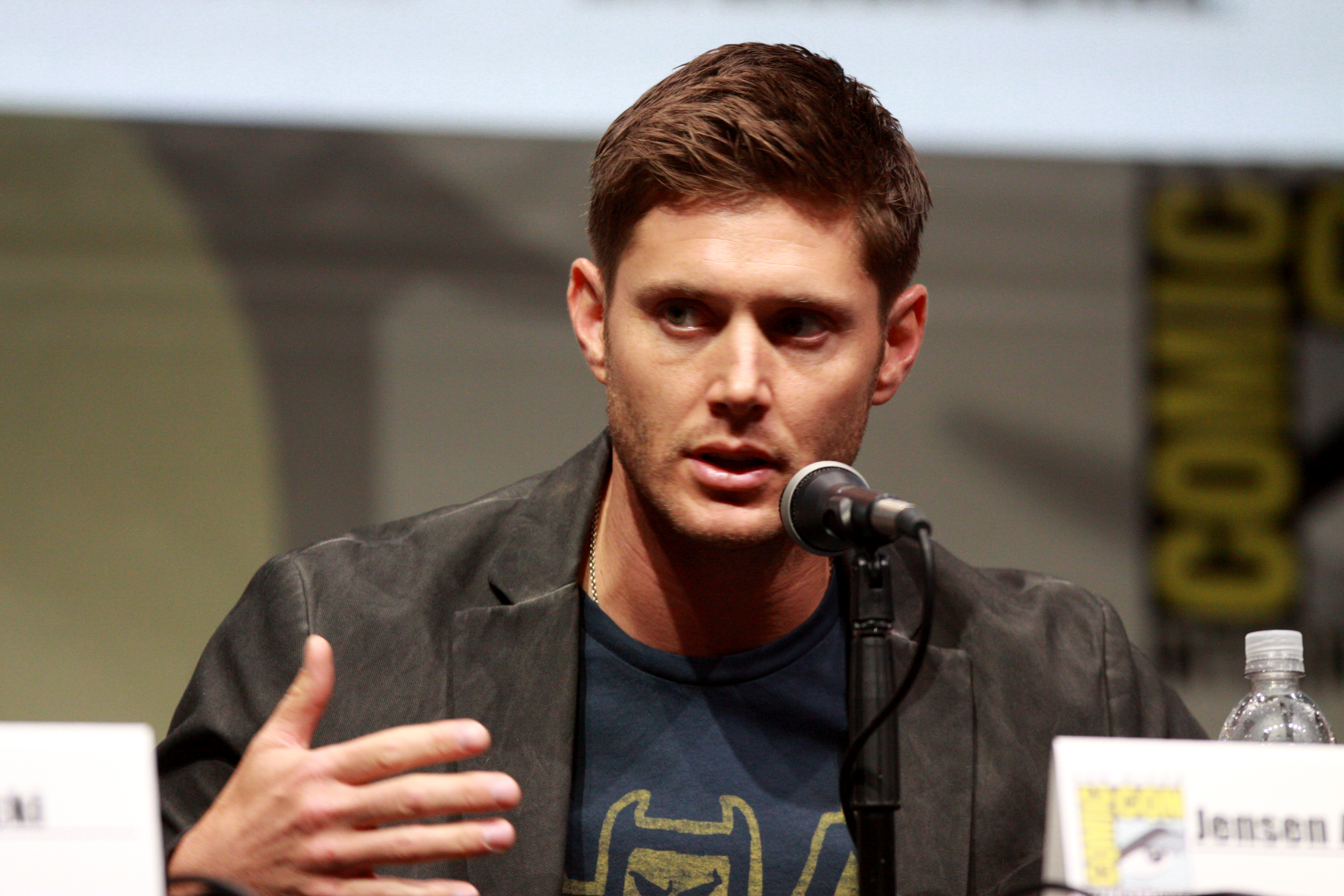
Ackles at the 2013 San Diego Comic-Con

In August 2020, it was announced he would join the cast of The Boys in its third season as Ben / B.C.L. RED / Soldier Boy. The third season premiered in 2022, with Ackles receiving critical acclaim for his performance. He would return as Soldier Boy in a guest role for the fourth season of the show, and returned to a main role for the fifth and final season. He later portrayed a version of Soldier Boy in the "Jumanji" episode of the show's spin-off Gen V who is an imaginary friend of Cate Dunlap. Ackles will reprise the role in the prequel Vought Rising, starring alongside Aya Cash as Stormfront.

In 2020, he and his wife formed Chaos Machine Productions with a deal at Warner Bros. Television. In June 2021, it was revealed that they were developing a Supernatural prequel spinoff for The CW, titled The Winchesters, about young John and Mary Winchester, Sam and Dean's parents. Ackles would serve as narrator, reprising his role as Dean. It was picked up in May 2022.

In October 2021, Ackles was cast to play U.S. Marshal Wood Helm in the Western feature Rust, written and directed by Joel Souza. He played opposite Alec Baldwin, who starred in the title role. Production was temporarily suspended after the accidental death of cinematographer Halyna Hutchins and later Ackles left the cast.

In May 2022, he guest starred on the ABC drama Big Sky's second season finale "Catch a Few Fish", as temporary sheriff Beau Arlen. The role was planted to be series regular for the show's third season, which was ordered the day after the episode aired, premiering in late 2022 with Ackles in a main role.

Since 2024, he has had a recurring role as Russell Shaw on the CBS action drama Tracker,. and in 2025 starred as Detective Mark Meachum in the crime drama Countdown.

=== Music ===
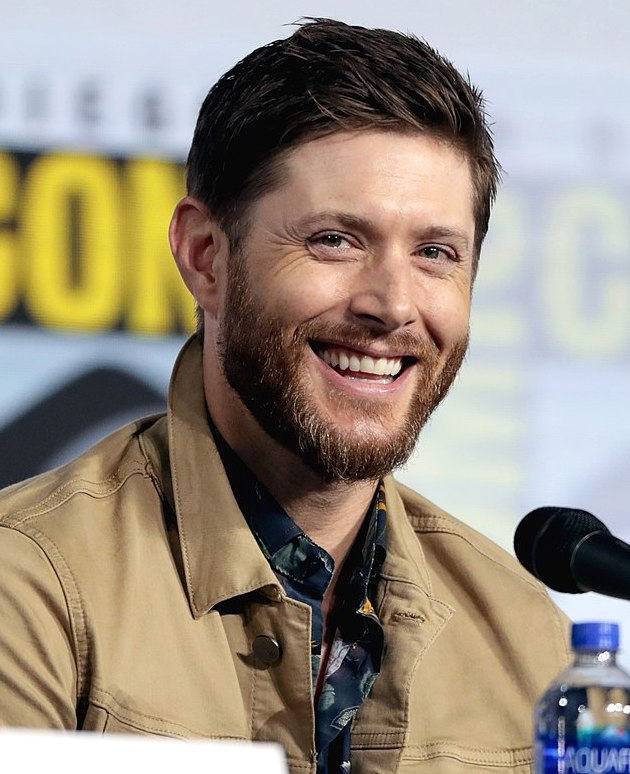
Ackles at the 2019 San Diego Comic-Con

In 2018, Ackles collaborated with longtime friend and musician Steve Carlson to form Radio Company; the duo had previously worked together on Carlson's 2003 album Rollin' On, his 2007 Christmas EP An Auld School Christmas and his 2012 album Different Town. As Radio Company, Ackles and Carlson completed their debut album, Vol. 1. The album's first single, "Sounds of Someday", was released on October 18 2019, and the album was released on November 8 2019. In April 2021, Radio Company released two new singles, "City Grown Willow" and "Quarter To" ahead of their second album, Vol. 2, which released on May 7, 2021.

On December 19, 2022, Radio Company played live for the first time in Nashville. Their third album, Keep On Ramblin', was released on February 24, 2023, and was followed by their first live album later that year, when they announced that their debut Nashville performance was being pressed for release. A 17-track double album, titled Live from Nashville, was released on November 24, 2023.

Outside of Radio Company, Ackles has collaborated multiple times with singer-songwriter Jason Manns; notably, Ackles contributed covers of "Simple Man" by Lynyrd Skynyrd and "The Weight" by The Band to Manns's 2016 album Covers with Friends, along with covers of "Up on Cripple Creek" by The Band and "The Joker" by Steve Miller Band to Manns's 2018 album, Recovering with Friends. Ackles often performs at conventions, both with Radio Company and with other musicians.

As part of the soundtrack for The Boys season 3, Ackles contributed a cover of the Robert Mitchum song "From a Logical Point of View", sung in character as Soldier Boy, whom he portrays on the show.

== Personal life ==
After three years of dating, Ackles became engaged to actress and model Danneel Harris in November 2009. The couple married on May 15, 2010, in Dallas. Their first child, a daughter, was born in May 2013. In August 2016, the couple announced that they were expecting twins, a boy and a girl who were born in December.

Ackles is a co-owner, with his wife and in-laws, of the Family Business Beer Company brewery in Dripping Springs, Texas. The brewery's name is a reference to Supernatural ("family business" being a tagline for the series).

== Filmography ==
=== Film ===
Year	Title	Role	Notes
2004	The Plight of Clownana	Jensen	Short film; also executive producer and first assistant director
2005	Devour	Jake Gray	
2007	Ten Inch Hero	Boaz Priestly	
2009	My Bloody Valentine 3D	Tom Hanniger	
2010	Batman: Under the Red Hood	Jason Todd / Red Hood	Direct to video; voice role
2019	Buddy Games	Jack Durfy	Cameo
2021	Batman: The Long Halloween	Bruce Wayne / Batman	Direct to video; voice role
2023	Legion of Super-Heroes	Bruce Wayne / Batman	Direct to video; voice role
2023	Justice League: Warworld	Bruce Wayne / Batman	Direct to video; voice role
2023	Buddy Games: Spring Awakening	Jack Durfy	
2024	Justice League: Crisis on Infinite Earths	Bruce Wayne / Batman	Direct to video; voice role

=== Television ===
Year	Title	Role	Notes
1996	Wishbone	Michael Dunn	Episode: "Viva Wishbone!"
1996	Sweet Valley High	Brad Rollins	Episode: "All Along in the Water Tower"
1996–1997	Mr. Rhodes	Malcolm	Recurring role; 7 episodes
1997	Cybill	David	Episode: "The Wedding"
1997–2000	Days of Our Lives	Eric Brady	Series regular; 469 episodes
2001	Blonde	Eddie G. Robinson	Television film
2001–2002	Dark Angel	Ben / X5-493, Alec McDowell / X5-494	Episode: "Pollo Loco" (Season 1), Main role; (Season 2)
2002–2003	Dawson's Creek	C.J. Braxton	Recurring role
2003	Still Life	Max Morgan	Unaired television series
2004–2005	Smallville	Jason Teague	Main role (season 4); 22 episodes
2005–2020	Supernatural	Dean Winchester	Main role
2011	Supernatural: The Anime Series	Dean Winchester	Main role
2012	Undead Noise	Event Guest	Episode: "Flying Solo"
2015–2018	The Hillywood Show	Dancer / Himself	Guest
2017	Kings of Con	Justin Angles	Episode: "Arlington, VA"
2022	Walker	Miles Vyas	Cameo, also director; episode: "No Such Thing as Fair Play"
2022–2023	Big Sky	Beau Arlen	Guest (season 2); main role (season 3)
2022–2026	The Boys	Ben / Soldier Boy	Main role (season 3); guest (season 4); recurring (season 5)
2022–2023	The Winchesters	Dean Winchester	Recurring role; also executive producer
2023	Gen V	"Soldier Boyfriend"	Episode: "Jumanji"
2024–present	Tracker	Russell Shaw	Recurring role
2025	Countdown	Mark Meachum	Main role
2026	The Rookie	Himself	Cameo; episode: "Survive the Streets"
2027	Vought Rising	Ben / Soldier Boy	Main role; also executive producer

=== Video games ===
Year	Title	Role	Notes
2010	Tron Evolution: Battle Grids	Gibson	Voice role
2010	Tron: Evolution	Gibson	Voice role
2011	The 3rd Birthday	Kyle Madigan	Voice role
2012	Life Weaver	Dark Elf	Voice role
2023	Atomic Heart	Major Nechayev	Live action trailer
2026	The Boys: Trigger Warning	Soldier Toy	Voice role

=== Director ===
Year	Title	Notes
2010–2015 & 2019	Supernatural	6 episodes
2022	Walker	Episode: "No Such Thing As Fair Play"

== Discography ==
=== with Radio Company ===
==== Studio albums ====
- Vol. 1 (2019)
- Vol. 2 (2021)
- Keep On Ramblin' (2023)

==== Live albums ====
- Live From Nashville (2023)

== Awards and nominations ==
Year	Work	Awards	Category	Result	Refs
1998	Days of Our Lives	Soap Opera Digest Awards	Best Male Newcomer	Won	
1998	Days of Our Lives	Daytime Emmy Awards	Outstanding Younger Actor in a Drama Series	Nominated	
1999	Days of Our Lives	Daytime Emmy Awards	Outstanding Younger Actor in a Drama Series	Nominated	
2000	Days of Our Lives	Daytime Emmy Awards	Outstanding Younger Actor in a Drama Series	Nominated	
2006	Supernatural	Teen Choice Awards	TV – Choice Breakout Star	Nominated	
2006	Supernatural	Constellation Awards	Best Male Performance in a 2006 Science Fiction Television Episode (for "In My Time of Dying")	Nominated	
2007	Supernatural	SFX Awards	Best TV Actor	Nominated	
2008	Supernatural	Constellation Awards	Best Male Performance in a 2007 Science Fiction Television Episode (for "What Is and what Should Never Be")	Nominated	
2008	Supernatural	Ewwy Awards	Best Actor in a Drama Series	Nominated	
2009	Supernatural	Constellation Awards	Best Male Performance in a 2008 Science Fiction Television Episode (for "In the Beginning")	Nominated	
2010	Supernatural	Ewwy Awards	Best Actor in a Drama Series	Won	
2010	Supernatural	Constellation Awards	Best Male Performance in a 2009 Science Fiction Television Episode (for "The End")	Nominated	
2011	Supernatural	TV Guide Awards	Favourite Actor	Won	
2012	Supernatural	Teen Choice Awards	Choice TV Actor: Fantasy/Sci-Fi	Nominated	
2013	Supernatural	Constellation Awards	Best Male Performance in a 2012 Science Fiction Television Episode (for "We Need To Talk About Kevin")	Nominated	
2013	Supernatural	People's Choice Awards	Favorite Dramatic TV Actor	Nominated	
2013	Supernatural	SFX Awards	Best TV Actor	Nominated	
2013	Supernatural	Teen Choice Awards	Choice TV Actor: Fantasy/Sci-Fi	Nominated	
2014	Supernatural	People's Choice Awards	Favorite Sci-Fi/Fantasy TV Actor	Nominated	
2014	Supernatural	People's Choice Awards	Favorite TV Bromance (shared with Jared Padalecki and Misha Collins)	Won	
2015	Supernatural	Teen Choice Awards	Choice TV Chemistry: Jensen Ackles & Misha Collins	Won	
2016	Supernatural	People's Choice Awards	Favorite Sci-fi/Fantasy TV Actor	Won	
2017	Supernatural	People's Choice Awards	Favorite Sci-fi/Fantasy TV Actor	Nominated	
2017	Supernatural	Teen Choice Awards	Choice Sci-Fi/Fantasy TV Actor	Nominated	
2021	Supernatural	Critics' Choice Super Awards	Best Male Actor in a Horror Series	Won	
2022	The Boys	Saturn Awards	Best Guest-Starring Performance (Streaming)	Nominated	
2024	The Boys	Astra TV Awards	Best Supporting Actor in a Streaming Drama Series	Won	
