= Bridgetta =

Bridgetta is a feminine given name, a version of the Irish name, Bridget. It means strong, or strong willed. Notable people with the name include:

- Bridgetta Tomarchio (born 1978), actress, model, and infomercial host
- Bridgetta Clark (1891–1980), early silent film actress
