= Cláudya =

Brazilian singer

Claudya
- Born: Maria das Graças Rallo; May 10, 1948 (age 78); Rio de Janeiro, Brazil
- Genres: MPB; bossa nova; samba; samba rock; young guard; pop rock; rock and roll
- Occupation: Singer
- Instruments: Vocal; piano; electric piano; keyboards
- Years active: 1964–present
- Labels: GER; Winter and Summer; Philips

Maria das Graças Rallo (born May 10, 1948), known by her stage name Cláudya (Brazilian Portuguese pronunciation: [ˈklawdʒ(i)ɐ]), and formerly Cláudia and Cláudia Oliveira, is a Brazilian singer.

== Biography ==
She debuted at age eight in a talent show at Radio Company of Juiz de Fora, where she grew up. At thirteen, she was a singer at parties and dances of the city.
