= The Cycle (2026 film) =

Horror film by Jordan Downey

- Release poster
- Directed by: Jordan Downey
- Screenplay by: Jordan Downey; Kevin Stewart
- Produced by: Michael W. Downey; James Harris; Mark Lane
- Starring: Deborah Ann Woll; Jeffrey Donovan; Gretchen Corbett; Phillip Andre Botello; Will Hochman
- Cinematography: Kevin Stewart
- Edited by: Jordan Downey
- Music by: Nick Soole
- Production companies: BondIt Media Capital; Tea Shop Productions
- Distributed by: Shudder
- Release dates: September 17, 2026 (Fantastic Fest); October 23, 2026 (United States)
- Running time: 111 minutes
- Countries: United Kingdom; United States
- Language: English

The Cycle is a 2026 horror film directed by Jordan Downey, who also co-wrote the screenplay with Kevin Stewart. The film stars Deborah Ann Woll as a forensic anthropologist whose long-missing father's body mysteriously surfaces at a crime scene, forcing her to confront his dark past. The movie blends crime procedural elements with creature-feature horror.

The Cycle had its world premiere at Fantastic Fest in September 2026 and was released on streaming platform Shudder on October 23, 2026. It received mixed reviews from critics.

== Plot ==
After the brutal, animal-like killings of a mother and daughter and the discovery of a third body, police officer Ian approaches forensic anthropologist Megan Garland. Ian reveals the third body belongs to her father, Peter Stump, who abandoned her mother Joni during her childhood. Still suffering from panic attacks triggered by childhood memories, Meg agrees to examine the bodies.

Accompanied by Ian, his father Lieutenant Marks, and coroner Joe, Meg examines Stump's remains. She determines that he died by suicide a month ago, but cannot explain why the corpse remains well preserved. After conducting a second autopsy and discovering several oddities, she requests to be added to the case.

That night, a creature attacks and kills Ian at the morgue, and the ensuing struggle causes a fire that destroys the building. Weeks later, Meg approaches a grieving Marks with her findings: bite marks on the victims are consistent with both human and non-human teeth. They visit Joni and ask about Stump's past. Joni reveals that, following Stump's disappearance, police questioned her about his relationship with Lou Bishop. Suspecting criminal activity, she changed their names and moved away with Meg. Meg is upset that Joni made it impossible for her father to return to them.

Investigating Bishop's connection to Stump, Meg and the team discover that Bishop was mauled and disfigured on the day Stump disappeared, but survived the attack. At Bishop's address, a man named Daniel Webb answers the door and denies knowing him, but is later shown secretly caring for Bishop. Soon afterward, another body is discovered in a workshop. Nearby, they find Stump's corpse, with blood and flesh in his teeth and beneath his fingernails. Meg spots Daniel and Bishop observing the crime scene, and both men are taken in for questioning.

Daniel reveals that Bishop has a psychic connection to the creature, because he had survived its attack. In the police station morgue, Stump's corpse reanimates and transforms into a werewolf. It kills Joe and several other officers before fleeing when Marks shoots it. Bishop tells Meg that the werewolf is heading to Stump's cabin. Meg, Marks, and the wounded officer Lenny set out to kill it. Meg realizes that the werewolf remains within its host's body after death, explaining the otherwise inexplicable preservation and relocation of Stump's corpse.

At Stump's cabin, they learn of his attempts to cure lycanthropy involving silver and occult rituals, and find an electrified cage where he confined himself. Meg finds a videotape addressed to her and Joni, in which Stump apologizes for abandoning them and explains that he took his own life to end his lycanthropy and keep them safe. The werewolf bursts in and kills Lenny, then chases Meg and Marks into the basement. Marks electrocutes himself and the werewolf, but it escapes to a nearby beach. Meg pursues the werewolf, tricks it into attacking her and impales it with a boat hook. As the sun rises, the creature reverts to Stump's corpse.

Some time later, Meg and Marks, who survived the electrocution, enter the woods. They document their trials of cures on Stump's chained corpse. Daniel receives a videotape intended for Bishop. The recording reveals how Stump contracted lycanthropy at an oil rig, attacked Bishop, and subsequently fled in an attempt to protect his family.

== Cast ==
- Deborah Ann Woll as Meg
- Jeffrey Donovan as Marks
- Gretchen Corbett as Joni
- Phillip Andre Botello as Daniel
- Will Hochman as Ian
- Carl W. Crudup as Lou Bishop
- Dana Millican as Fran
- Don Keith Opper as Frank
- Jack Doolan as Lenny
- Jeb Berrier as Joe Ratterman
- David Myers Gregory as Peter

== Production ==
The Cycle was directed by Jordan Downey, marking his return to feature filmmaking after The Head Hunter (2018) and his segment in the anthology V/H/S/Beyond (2024). The filming mostly took place in Astoria, OR.

== Release ==
The Cycle had its world premiere at Fantastic Fest in September 2026 and was released on the streaming service Shudder on October 23, 2026.

== Reception ==
On the review aggregator website Rotten Tomatoes, 95% of 41 critics' reviews are positive, with an average rating of 7.6/10. Metacritic, which uses a weighted average, assigned the film a score of 59 out of 100, based on six critics, indicating "mixed or average" reviews.

Richard Wittaker of The Austin Chronicle stated: "The Cycle isn’t about solving a crime in the standard piece-by-piece manner of the police procedural. It’s about expanding the possibilities of what is happening into the unscientific illogical – to quote Sherlock Holmes, when you have eliminated the impossible, whatever remains, however improbable, must be the truth... Much like The Head Hunter, The Cycle shows Downey as a horror director of rare compassion, making the agonies that Meg faces as she exhumes her father’s secret so much weightier." Chris Evangelista of SlashFilm wrote: "Whatever flaws it might have, The Cycle reminded me of some of that classic makeup work and charmed me. It's nice to know horror filmmakers are still out there trying to recapture some of that old school monster magic." Brian Tallerico of RogerEbert.com mentioned: "The Cycle isn't the first film to transform a family drama into a monster movie, but it feels fresh due to the commitment of its creators. It's one of those films for which you have to suspend disbelief, which it feels like movie goers used to do more easily than in an era in which every piece of movie magic is deconstructed on social media."
