= Rachel McDowall =

English actress (born 1984)

- Born: 4 October 1984 (age 40); Whiston, Merseyside, England
- Occupation: Actress
- Spouse: Constantine Tzortzis (m. 2014)

Rachel Anne McDowall (born 4 October 1984) is an English actress.

== Early life ==
Rachel Anne McDowall was born on 4 October 1984 in Whiston, Merseyside. She developed an affinity for drama while attending Wade Deacon High School in nearby Widnes, Cheshire. She continued her acting studies at Laine Theatre Arts in Epsom, Surrey.

== Career ==
McDowall made her film debut as Lisa in the 2008 film Mamma Mia! The Movie, and had her last of eight film or television roles in a 2016 episode of Zoe Ever After. On stage, she played Swedish woman Ulla in Mel Brooks' musical The Producers in the West End and Velma Kelly in productions of the musical Chicago, in the West End and at the Cambridge Theatre in 2008, and the Garrick Theatre in 2012.

== Personal life ==
On 16 May 2014, McDowall married Constantine Tzortzis, a Greek-American restaurant owner best known for his appearance on the 2007 season of The Bachelorette.

== Filmography ==
=== Film ===
| Year | Title | Role |
|---|---|---|
| 2008 | Mamma Mia! The Movie | Lisa |
| 2008 | Quantum of Solace | Anna |
| 2010 | StreetDance 3D | Isabella |
| 2014 | The Stranger | Jayne |
| 2021 | The Shuroo Process | Edie |

=== Television ===
| Year | Title | Role | Notes |
|---|---|---|---|
| 2009 | The Bill | Nurse Maria Joseph | 2 episodes |
| 2016 | Zoe Ever After | Carissa | 1 episode |

=== Video games ===
| Year | Title | Role | Notes |
|---|---|---|---|
| 2013 | Ryse: Son of Rome | Boudica | Voice |
