= Vol. 2 (Radio Company album) =

Studio album by Radio Company
- Released: May 7, 2021
- Recorded: January – June 2020
- Studio: Austin, Texas
- Length: 34:38
- Label: Two Chair Entertainment
- Producer: Steve Carlson

Radio Company chronology
Vol. 1 (2019)	Vol. 2 (2021)	Keep On Ramblin' (2023)

Singles from Vol. 2
- 1. "City Grown Willow" Released: April 2, 2021; 2. "Quarter To" Released: April 9, 2021

Vol. 2 is the second studio album by Radio Company. It was released on May 7, 2021, by Two Chair Entertainment. The band started working on the album in January 2020 and finished recording on June 13, 2020.

The album was released along with Vol. 1 on CD in a double release. The album was released on vinyl on March 21, 2022.

== Singles ==
A music video for "City Grown Willow" was released on April 2, 2021.

"Quarter To" was released on April 9, 2021.

== Usage in Media ==
"All My Livin' Time" was featured in season 2 episode 14 of CW's Walker of which Jensen Ackles directed.

== Track listing ==
All tracks were written by Carlson and Ackles. All tracks were produced by Carlson.

Vol. 2 track listing
No.	Title	Length
1.	"All My Livin' Time"	4:07
2.	"Quarter To"	3:58
3.	"Watching over Me"	3:49
4.	"Truly Forgotten"	4:14
5.	"Dead to Rights"	4:00
6.	"Jump on into the Fire"	3:10
7.	"Eyes on Me"	3:28
8.	"Any Way That You Want Me"	3:59
9.	"City Grown Willow"	3:49
Total length:		34:38

== Personnel ==
- Jensen Ackles – vocals, backing vocals, writer (All tracks)
- Steve Carlson – vocals, backing vocals, writer (All tracks), producer (All tracks), electric guitar, acoustic guitar, piano, bass, lap steel, synth, mandolin
- Eric Tessmer – electric guitar (Track 1, 6)
- Sheree Smith – backing vocals
- Angela Miller – backing vocals
- Bukka Allen – piano, organ, keyboards
- Pat Manske – drums (Track 4, 7), mixing engineer (All tracks)
- Tom Freund – upright bass (Track 4)
- Chris Masterson – guitar (Track 2)
- Topaz McGarrigle – saxophone
- Steward Cole – trumpet
- Matt Hubbard – trombone
- Sarah Hall – harp
- Warren Hood – violin
- Brian Standefer – cello
- Howie Weinberg – mastering engineer (All tracks)
- Tom Jean Webb – album artwork
- Mishka Westell – additional design

== Charts ==
Chart performance for Vol. 2
Chart (2021)	Peak position
US Heatseekers Albums (Billboard)	16
US Top Album Sales (Billboard)	49
