= Elizabeth Posey =

American actress

- Occupation: Actress
- Years active: 2019–present
- Family: Tyler Posey (cousin); John Posey (uncle)

Elizabeth Posey is an American television and film actress.

== Biography ==
Posey is the cousin of actor-musician Tyler Posey and niece of actor John Posey. She appeared as Becky in HBO teenage drama series Euphoria. She appeared in the feature films Gully (2019), and Dreamcatcher (2021).

On television, she appeared in comedy series It’s Always Sunny in Philadelphia, and had a recurring role on Starz series Heels. In March 2025, she joined the cast of Vought Rising, a spin-off prequel series from superhero television comedy series The Boys, portraying Private Angel.

== Filmography ==
Year	Title	Role	Notes
2019	Euphoria	Becky	1 episode
2019	Gully	Tammy	Film
2019	It’s Always Sunny in Philadelphia	Woman	1 episode
2021	Dreamcatcher	Ivy	Film
2021	Trevor and the Virgin	Tilla	3 episodes
2021	Heels	Tricia	2 episodes
2022	Resisting Roots	Genevieve	
TBA	Vought Rising	Private Angel	Lead role
