= Chane't Johnson =

American actress (1976–2010)

- Born: A'Drewana Chane't Johnson August 21, 1976; Dallas, Texas, U.S.
- Died: December 2, 2010 (aged 34); Los Angeles, California, U.S.
- Other name: Chanet Johnson
- Education: Southern Methodist University (BFA); University of California, San Diego (MFA)
- Occupations: Actress, Producer, Director, Acting Coach
- Years active: 1998–2010

Chane't Johnson (August 21, 1976 – December 2, 2010) was an American actress, director, producer and acting coach.

She appeared and guest starred in TV shows including Boston Public, Malcolm in the Middle, Without A Trace, LAX, Brothers and Life as well as directing and producing her own films and web series.

== Life and career ==
Born A'Drewana Chane't Johnson in Dallas, Texas, Johnson received a BFA in Theatre Arts from Southern Methodist University. She went on to earn an MFA in acting from the University of California, San Diego.

Johnson started out as a stage actress. She was a trained Shakespearean actress and performed in more than fourteen productions of Shakespeare's plays during multiple seasons of the Dallas Shakespeare Festival. In 2001, she was chosen for the role of Lena in the play Boesman and Lena, written and directed by South African playwright Athol Fugard.

As a television actress, Chane't had recurring guest-starring roles on shows such as Life, Day Break, LAX, Cold Case, Criminal Minds, Brothers, and Big Love.

She executive produced and starred in the web series, Nurses Who Kill... Her weekly web series Trailerate premiered in November 2009.

As an acting coach, she trained actors such as Denzel Whitaker (The Great Debaters, Training Day) and Nicole Travolta (The Secret Life of the American Teenager).

Johnson died from a heart attack in 2010.

Before her death, Johnson had increasingly been cast in feature films, playing opposite Rosanna Arquette, Tom Arnold, Ian Somerhalder and Bijou Phillips and was slated to produce and direct two feature horror/fantasy films, The Dark Sisters and Anomaly. She was the director of two short films, Texas Toast and Pony Man, which are set to play on the film festival circuit in 2011. Her short film First screened at the 2010 Newport Beach Film Festival.

== Filmography ==
Film
Year	Film	Role	Notes
2003	Sticky Fingers	Goodwill Volunteer	Short film
2004	Miracle Mile	Adoption Agency Worker	Short film
2004	A One Time Thing	Detective	
2005	Down Dog	Grace	Short film
2005	Stress, Orgasms and Salvation	Person	
2005	The Ring 2	Adoption Counselor	
2005	Love For Rent	Cashier	
2009	Wake	Cop	
2010	Jelly	Lucille	
2010	Convincing Clooney	Sherona	
2010	Walk a Mile in My Pradas	Psychic	
2011	The Chicago 8	Pamela	
Television
Year	Title	Role	Notes
2002	The Division	Woman #2	1 episode
2002	The District	Jury Foreperson	1 episode
2002	The Guardian	Mrs. Wilcox	1 episode
2002	Boomtown	Lois	1 episode
2002	Boston Public	Graduate #3	1 episode
2003	Angel	Martha Jane	1 episode
2003	Malcolm in the Middle	Customer	1 episode
2003	Monk	First Teacher	1 episode
2003	Emergency Room	Betsy	1 episode
2004	Without a Trace	Nora Wozniak	1 episode
2004	LAX	Tanika	7 episodes
2004	Girlfriends	Ellen	1 episode
2005	Criminal Minds	Barbara Raleigh	1 episode
2006	Huff	Dayna	1 episode
2006	Day Break	Neesha	3 episode
2007	Subs	Lunch Lady	TV movie
2008	Hackett	Coach Jenny	TV movie
2008	Ernesto	Receptionist 1	TV movie
2008	Dan's Detour of Life	Nicole Stevens	TV movie
2008	Cold Case	Carla DiFranco	1 episode
2009	Life	Agent Liz Ray	6 episodes
2009	Brothers	Candy	3 episodes
2010	Big Love	INS Agent	1 episode
2010	'Til Death	Nurse Lawanda	2 episodes
2010	The Middle.	Chess Mom	1 episode
