= Will Hochman =

American actor

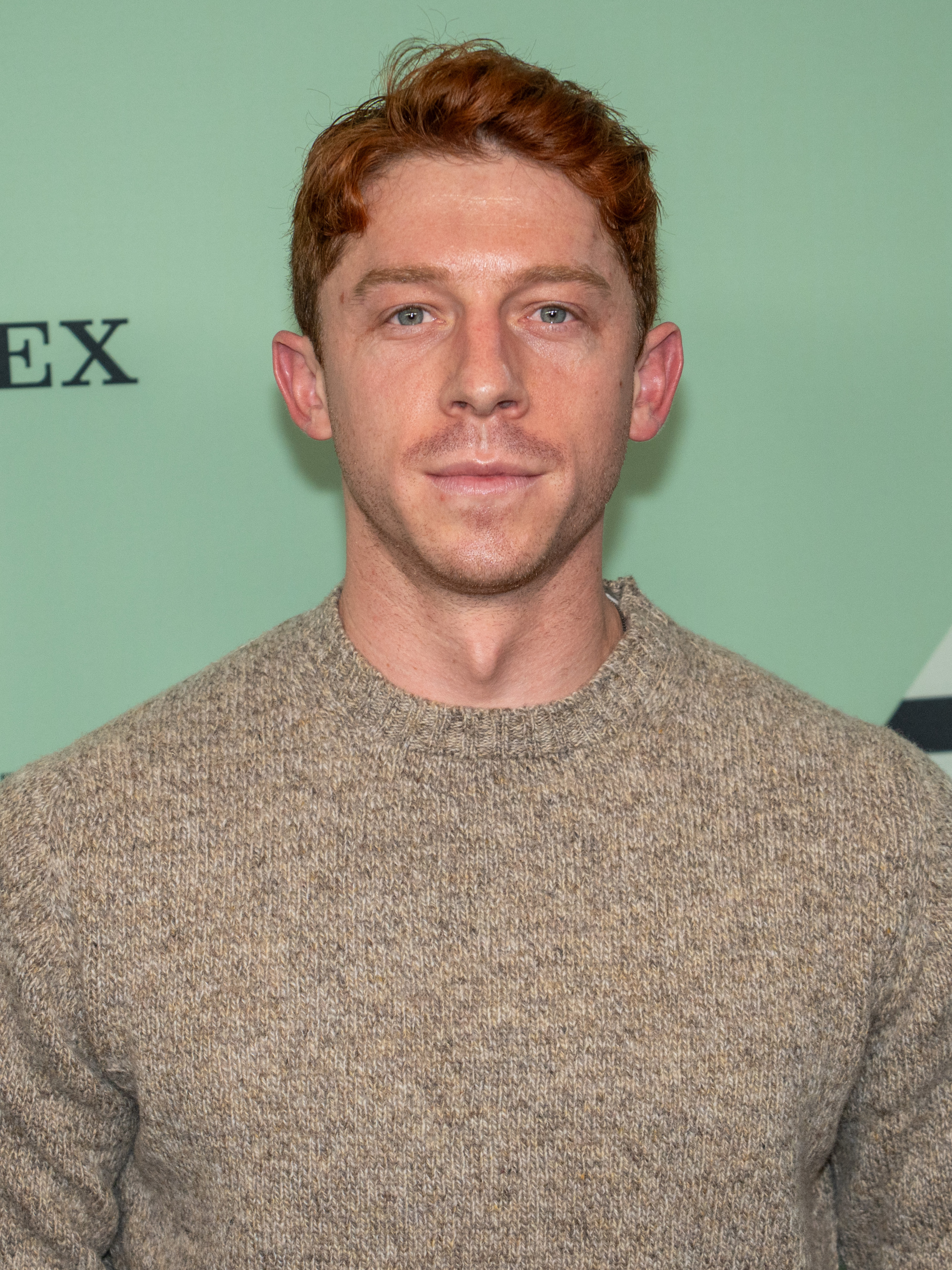
- Hochman in 2025
- Born: William Hochman; March 4, 1992 (age 34); Brooklyn, New York, U.S.
- Education: Colby College
- Occupation: Actor
- Years active: 2019–present

Will Hochman is an American stage, television and film actor.

== Early life ==
From Brooklyn, Hochman graduated from Colby College with a degree in economics. He started acting at the age of 20, and took an acting course at Colby's Department of Performance, Theater, and Dance and performed as a student at the Powder and Wig, Colby's student-run theatre club. His performances included playing John Proctor in a production of The Crucible.

== Career ==
Hochman's first professional stage play was a stage adaptation of Dead Poets Society for Classic Stage Company in New York. He had an early television appearance in CBS series The Code. His early film roles include John Leguizamo's directorial debut Critical Thinking, and the Kevin Costner film Let Him Go. He appeared on Broadway at Studio 54 between October 2019 and January 2020, in David Cromer's production of the play The Sound Inside by Adam Rapp. He played Christopher, a Yale student, alongside Mary-Louise Parker's professor Bella, for a total of 100 performances. The play received six Tony Award nominations, including for Best Play.

He appeared in five seasons of CBS series Blue Bloods, in the role of Joe Hill, joining the series in 2020. He appeared in the 2022 film The Greatest Beer Run Ever.

He had a recurring role in Billy Crystal and Judith Light's Apple TV+ series Before. He will star alongside Deborah Ann Woll and Jeffrey Donovan in The Cycle. In March 2025, he joined the cast of Vought Rising, a spin-off prequel series from superhero television comedy series The Boys as Torpedo.

== Personal life ==
Hochman lives in New York.

== Acting credits ==
=== Film ===
Year	Title	Role	Notes
2020	Critical Thinking	Gil Luna	
2020	Let Him Go	Tucker	
2022	Master	Tyler	
2022	The Greatest Beer Run Ever	Tommy Minogue	
2023	Atrabilious	Charles	
2024	Turning	Julian Turner	
2026	The Cycle	Ian Marks	

=== Television ===
Year	Title	Role	Notes
2019	The Code	Sgt Jacob Kalb	Episode: "Don and Doff"
2020–2024	Blue Bloods	Detective Joe Hill	Recurring role
2024	Feud: Capote vs. The Swans	Matt	Episode: "The Secret Inner Lives of Swans"
2024	Before	Benjamin Walker	Episodes: "Fever Dream" & "When We Dead Awaken"
2026	Boston Blue	Detective Joe Hill	Episode: "Patrol"
2027	Vought Rising	Torpedo	Series Regular

=== Stage ===
Year	Title	Role	Production	Notes
2016	Dead Poets Society	Knox Overstreet	Classic Stage Company	
2018	The Sound Inside	Christopher Dunn	Williamstown Theatre Festival	
2018	Sweat	Tucker	CTG Mark Taper Forum	
2019	The Sound Inside	Christopher Dunn	Studio 54 Broadway	Outer Critics Circle Award Best Actor
2024	Cyrano	Christian	Pasadena Playhouse	
