= Dreamcatcher (2021 film) =

- Poster
- Directed by: Jacob Johnston
- Written by: Jacob Johnston
- Produced by: Krystal Vayda; Brandon Vayda
- Starring: Niki Koss; Zachary Gordon; Travis Burns; Blaine Kern III; Olivia Sui; Emrhys Cooper; Elizabeth Posey; Nazanin Mandi; Adrienne Wilkinson; Lou Ferrigno Jr.
- Cinematography: Matthew Plaxco
- Edited by: Cody Miller
- Music by: Alexander Taylor
- Production companies: Archstone Entertainment; Quarzo Studios
- Distributed by: Samuel Goldwyn Films
- Release date: March 5, 2021
- Running time: 108 minutes
- Country: United States
- Language: English

Dreamcatcher is a 2021 horror film written and directed by Jacob Johnson.

== Synopsis ==
Two sisters must deal with a homicidal serial killer on the rampage at a nightclub.

== Cast ==
- Niki Koss as Pierce
- Zachary Gordon as Jake
- Travis Burns as Dylan 'DJ Dreamcatcher'
- Blaine Kern III as Hunter
- Olivia Sui as Raye
- Emrhys Cooper as Brecken
- Elizabeth Posey as Ivy
- Adrienne Wilkinson as Josephine
- Lou Ferrigno Jr. as Colton
- Nazanin Mandi as Kya
- Ryan Powers as DJ Dreamcatcher
- Al Calderon as Zeke the Stagehand
- Ben J. Pierce as Scott

== Development ==
Johnson has stated that films such as Suspiria, The Night of the Hunter, and The Neon Demon were a big influence on Dreamcatcher. Alexander Taylor was brought on to create the score and actors Niki Koss, Zachary Gordon, and Travis Burns were confirmed as performing in the film.

== Release ==
Dreamcatcher was released on VOD on March 5, 2021 through Samuel Goldwyn Films.

== Reception ==
On the review aggregator website Rotten Tomatoes, 36% of 11 critics' reviews are positive.

The film's criticism mostly centered on the plot, which Dread Central and Common Sense Media felt offered nothing new to the genre: a reviewer for Film Threat criticized the script, highlighting "Johnston's stilted, inconsequential dialogue", while Starburst felt that the film was convoluted.
