= Walk a Mile in My Pradas =

- Film poster for Walk a Mile in My Pradas
- Directed by: Joey Sylvester
- Written by: Rick Karatas; Tom Archdeacon
- Produced by: Tom Archdeacon; Vincent De Paul
- Starring: Nathaniel Marston; Tom Archdeacon; Tom Arnold; Mike Starr; Dee Wallace; Kirsten Lea; Emrhys Cooper; Lindsay Hollister
- Cinematography: Aaron Moorhead
- Edited by: Jeffrey Reid
- Music by: Andrew Markus
- Production companies: Walk A Mile Productions, Dream It Productions, FROST Pictures
- Distributed by: PRO-FUN media (Germany, Austria and Switzerland); Optimale (France); Breaking Glass Pictures (World-wide, DVD)
- Release date: 15 November 2011 (USA)
- Running time: 87 minutes
- Country: United States
- Language: English
- Budget: $2,000,000 (estimated)

Walk a Mile in My Pradas is a 2011 American gay body-switching romantic comedy film directed by Joey Sylvester.

A magic Christmas ornament turns two men's lives upside down when homophobic Tony starts preferring men two weeks before his wedding and his gay co-worker Steve finds himself blossoming into a ladies' man.

It was filmed in locations such as Hollywood and Silver Lake, Los Angeles, California.

It was Nathaniel Marston's final film, before he was involved in a car crash that led to his death.

== Plot ==
On a new jobsite, homophobic construction worker Tony (Nathaniel Marston) and a gay co-worker Steve, (Tom Archdeacon) meet and instantly hate each other, with Tony making life on the site unbearable for Steve. Then at a party, both wishes that the other would switch lifestyles, a magical Christmas tree angel glows. Later, the two find a transformation has taken place. Tony begins acting strange; he starts to like cooking and cruising guys in gay bars, while Steve, to the dismay of lover Michael (Emrhys Cooper), begins to check out and fancy girls. Tony finds that his gay intolerance is due to his Italian Catholic parents (Dee Wallace, Mike Starr) and his schoolteacher Sister Betty (Bunny Levine). Both try to fix things to return to normal before Tony's wedding.

== Cast ==
- Nathaniel Marston as Tony
- Tom Archdeacon as Steve
- Tom Arnold as Joe
- Mike Starr as John
- Dee Wallace as Mary
- Kirsten Lea as Sarah
- Rick Karatas as Brian (billed as Rick Sudi Karatas)
- Emrhys Cooper as Michael
- Lindsay Hollister as Laura
- Darren Keefe Reiher as Danny (billed as Darren Keefe)
- Sammy Sheik as Carlos
- Jackie Debatin as Trish
- Tina Lynch as Kathy
- Chandler Lutz as Stefanie
- Vincent De Paul as Keith
- Jennifer Choe as Rachel (billed as Jae Choe)
- Adriana Fricke as Maria
- Bruce Vilanch as himself
- Bunny Levine as Sister Betty
- Jason Stuart as Dr. Feist
- Chane't Johnson as Psychic
- Chris Damiano as Evangelist
- Lorraine Marx Epstein as Therapist
- Bridgetta Tomarchio as Gina, The Stripper
- Larry Weissman as Harold
- Eric Casaccio as Glen
- Jabari Jones as Leonard
- Renzo Lewis as Infomercial Guy
- Heather Martin as Young Mary
- Eli Dow as Young Tony
- Becca Battoe as Hot Girl, The Slapper
- Adam Borich as Cute Guy On Street
- Carlos Antonio as Pizza Guy
- Brian Arnott as Jake
- Mark Behar as Matt, Video Store Guy
- Marie Todd as Waitress
- Felipe Piña as Caterer (billed as Felipe Pina)
- Christopher Gaida as Bartender (billed as Chris Gaida)
- Sunny McMillian-Kientz as Sexy Restaurant Patron
- Natalie Wetta as Slo-Mo Sidewalk Girl
- Val Tasso as Loco
- Aldo Gonzalez as Diablo
- Orlando Chavez as Muggs
- Manuel Suarez Jr. as Smokey (billed as Manuel Suarez)
- Jeff Karr as Sweet Jesus
- David Chick as Save That Boy
- Phillip Agresta as Sweater Guy (billed as Phil Agresta)
- Jackie Leigh as Sanctimonious Couple
- Robert John Pratt as Sanctimonious Couple
- Karla Guy as Caroler 1
- Frank Perry as Caroler 2
- Karen Agnes as Caroler 3
- Danny Farrell as Mr. Socket
- Charity Faith Johnson as Nun 1 (billed as Charity Johnson)
- Claudio Luna as Gay Couple in Park
- Carlos Romani as Gay Couple in Park

== Reception ==
Richard Propes from theindependentcritic.com gave the film B+ or 3.5 stars out of 5 rating. He also notes "script that is filled with terrific one-liners" and it is a "terrific example of the independent spirit of Hollywood". Don Grigware called it the "perfect holiday fare. It's breezy and uplifting". Andy Goulding on 30 November 2012, reviewed the DVD and gave it 1/2 a star out of 5 and noted "one of the worst films I’ve ever seen and that’s not even touching on the acting, which ranges from barely adequate to abominable", "The script is totally devoid of any sort of wit or charm and even its more dramatic character scenes are flimsy". While David Hall from www.gaycelluloid.com states "given all too many jokes are at the expense of stereotype" and "whilst ever preaching the message of gay rights. And frankly, that's a message well worth repeating".

Walk a Mile in My Pradas was a winner in the 2011 Hoboken International Film Festival for Best Trailer and Best Supporting Actor Tom Archdeacon.

The DVD was released on 15 November 2011 on Region 1 (in U.S. and Canada only). The DVD was also released on the Breaking Glass UK catalogue on 28 January 2013.
