= Dexter Britain =

- Born: 13 July 1989 (age 36); St Albans, Hertfordshire, England, UK
- Genres: Contemporary classical music; Modern cinematic; Electronic music
- Occupations: Composer; producer; songwriter
- Website: dexterbritain.com

Dexter Britain (born 13 July 1989) is an English self-taught pianist, composer, record producer and songwriter. Best known for his standout piece, "The Time To Run (Finale)". He has become noted for his soundtrack composition.

His work has been used more than 11 000 times and features in projects from commercials, and feature films, to charity videos, and weddings. Among his clients are G-Tech, GoPro, World Health Organization, NASA, O2, Jason Silva (Shots of Awe, Future Of Us), TEDx, Kelloggs, Nike, BVLGARI, McLaren, Bentley, National Geographic, UNICEF, Ralph Lauren, Myers Department Store, Nationwide Insurance, Google, O2 Telefonica, LG.

== Awards ==
=== International Song Writing Competition ===
- 2016: Charge into 2017 Instrumental Category - 2nd place winner

== Discography ==
During 2012 and 2016, Britain released 22 albums:

- Nothing to Fear - 1 track (2012)
- Utopia - 4 tracks (2012)
- Creative Commons Volume.1 - 14 tracks (2012)
- Music To Sell Cars By - 12 tracks (2012)
- Creative Commons Volume.2 - 12 tracks (2012)
- Same Old Moments - 12 tracks (2012)
- In Space And Time - 12 tracks (2012)
- Creative Commons Volume.3 - 9 tracks (2012)
- Creative Commons Volume.4 - 6 tracks (2012)
- Xmas 2012 - 3 tracks (2012)
- Creative Commons Volume.5 - 12 tracks (2012)
- Creative Commons Volume.6 - 12 tracks (2013)
- Utopia - EP - 4 tracks (2013)
- Solo - 12 tracks (2013)
- Light of Life - 14 tracks (2013)
- Ardor - 5 tracks (2013)
- Zenith - 3 tracks (2013)
- Zenith - Single - 3 tracks (2013)
- The Score - 16 tracks (2014)
- The Best Of Creative Commons - 19 tracks (2014)
- Charge Into 2015 - 1 track (2014)
- Impression - 5 tracks (2015)
- Till We Meet Again (Music from The Motion Picture) - 15 tracks (2015)
- Love Is Love - 1 track (2016)
- Creative Commons Volume.7 - 12 tracks (2016)

== Filmography ==
Credited as a composer 25 times in movies and TV series:

- Bubbles Beat (Documentary short) - 2012
- Stroke of Misfortune (Documentary short) - 2012
- Coder (Short) - 2013
- The Awakening (Short) - 2013
- Prescindibles (Short) - 2013
- Where the Wonder Went (Documentary short) - 2013
- Molinillos (Short) - 2013
- Light Mind (Documentary short) - 2013
- Green Energy Futures (TV Series documentary short) (composer - 2 episodes) - 2013-2014
- I'll Never Hurt You (Short) - 2014
- The Finish Line (Short) - 2014
- Luciérnagas (Short) - 2014
- Whispers of the Ocean (Short) - 2014
- The Trench (Short) - 2014
- Salvage (Short) - 2014
- Captured (Short) - 2015
- Beíth (Short) - 2015
- Whyirun (TV Mini-Series short) - 2015
- A Housemate (Short) - 2015
- Neur-O (composer: theme music) - 2015
- Ética (Short) - 2016
- Dear (Short) - 2016
- A Man Called Dad (TV Short documentary) - 2016
- Till We Meet Again - 2016
- Penury's Song - 2016
