= Vol. 1 (Radio Company album) =

Studio album by Radio Company
- Released: November 8, 2019
- Studio: Arlyn Studios
- Length: 36:20
- Label: Two Chair Entertainment
- Producer: Steve Carlson

Radio Company chronology
Vol. 1 (2019)	Vol. 2 (2021)

Singles from Vol. 1
- 1. "Sounds of Someday" Released: October 18, 2019

Vol. 1 is the first studio album by Radio Company. It was released on November 8, 2019, by Two Chair Entertainment. The album was previously titled Cannonball. The album artwork was created by Tom Jean Webb.

The album peaked at number 151 on the Billboard 200, number 18 on the Billboard Top Rock Albums chart, and at number one on the Top Heatseekers chart where it stayed for two weeks. The band debuted at number five on the US Emerging Artists chart.

The album was released on vinyl and peaked at number 11 on the US Top Vinyl Albums chart. On May 7, 2021, the album was released on CD alongside Vol. 2 in a double CD release.

== Singles ==
"Sounds of Someday" was released on October 18, 2019. The song was used in an episode of the final season of Supernatural that Jensen Ackles directed and starred in.

== Track listing ==
All tracks were written by Carlson and Ackles. All tracks were produced by Carlson.

Vol. 1 track listing
No.	Title	Length
1.	"Cannonball"	3:30
2.	"Let Me Be"	2:58
3.	"Bound"	4:08
4.	"Sounds of Someday"	4:15
5.	"Off My Mind"	4:36
6.	"Drowning"	3:46
7.	"When I'm Down"	3:13
8.	"Livin in You"	3:28
9.	"All Our Own"	3:45
10.	"Dume"	2:42
Total length:		36:20

== Personnel ==
- Jensen Ackles – vocals (tracks 1, 2, 4, 6, 7, 9, 10), backing vocals (tracks 5, 8), writer (all tracks)
- Steve Carlson – vocals (tracks 1, 3, 5, 8, 10), backing vocals, writer (all tracks), producer (all tracks), guitar, electric guitar, lap steel, synth
- Chris Masterson – guitar
- Sheree Smith – backing vocals
- Angela Miller – backing vocals
- Bukka Allen – piano, organ, keyboards
- Brendon Bond – trumpet
- Warren Hood – violin
- Topaz McGarrigle – saxophone
- Chris Richards – trombone
- John Kyle Schneider – drums
- John Michael Schoepf – bass guitar
- Brian Standefer – cello (track 9)
- Jacob Sciba – mixing
- Joseph Holguin – engineer
- Howie Weinberg – mastering engineer

== Charts ==
Chart performance for Vol. 1
Chart (2019)	Peak position
US Billboard 200	151
US Independent Albums (Billboard)	2
US Top Rock Albums (Billboard)	18
US Heatseekers Albums (Billboard)	1
