= Vought Rising =

Upcoming American superhero series

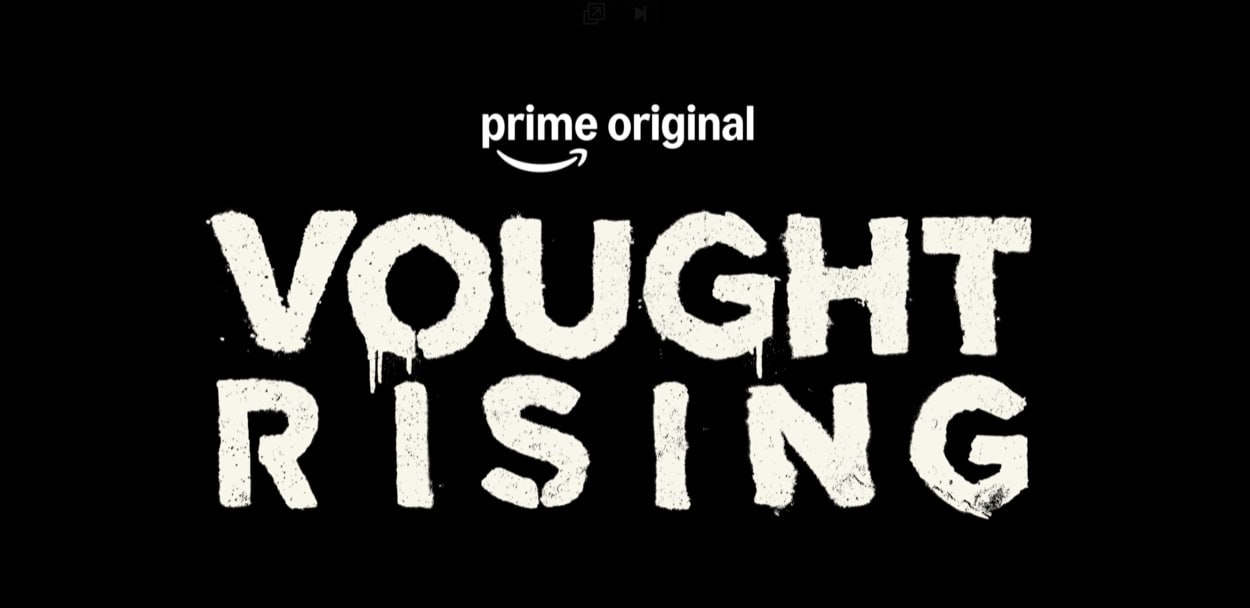
- Genre: Black comedy; Satire; Superhero; Neo-noir
- Based on: The Boys by Garth Ennis; Darick Robertson
- Developed by: Paul Grellong
- Showrunner: Paul Grellong
- Starring: Jensen Ackles; Aya Cash; Mason Dye; Will Hochman; KiKi Layne; Jorden Myrie; Nicolò Pasetti; Elizabeth Posey; Ricky Staffieri; Brian J. Smith
- Country of origin: United States
- Original language: English

Production
- Executive producers: Paul Grellong; Eric Kripke; Seth Rogen; Evan Goldberg; James Weaver; Neal H. Moritz; Pavun Shetty; Ori Marmur; Ken Levin; Jason Netter; Garth Ennis; Darick Robertson; Michaela Starr; Jim Barnes
- Producers: Jensen Ackles; Aya Cash
- Production companies: Kripke Enterprises; Point Grey Pictures; Original Film; Kickstart Entertainment; KFL Nightsky Productions; Amazon MGM Studios; Sony Pictures Television

Original release
- Network: Amazon Prime Video

Related
- The Boys (franchise)

Vought Rising is an upcoming American satirical superhero television series developed by Paul Grellong for Amazon Prime Video, serving as a prequel series to The Boys and Gen V, which is based on the comic book of the same name by Garth Ennis and Darick Robertson. The series will star Jensen Ackles as Soldier Boy, Aya Cash as Clara Vought, and Mason Dye as Bombsight, who will reprise their roles from The Boys, alongside Will Hochman, KiKi Layne, Jorden Myrie, Nicolò Pasetti, Elizabeth Posey, Ricky Staffieri, and Brian J. Smith. It will be the fourth series in The Boys franchise.

Vought Rising is expected to premiere on Amazon Prime Video in 2027.

== Premise ==
The series follows a twisted murder mystery about the origins of Vought in the 1950s, the early exploits of Soldier Boy, and the diabolical maneuvers of Stormfront.

== Cast and characters ==
=== Main ===
- Jensen Ackles as Ben / Soldier Boy
- Aya Cash as Clara Vought / Stormfront
- Mason Dye as Robbie / Bombsight
- Will Hochman as Torpedo
- KiKi Layne
- Jorden Myrie
- Nicolò Pasetti
- Elizabeth Posey as Private Angel
- Ricky Staffieri
- Brian J. Smith

=== Recurring ===
- Cecily Strong
- Mark Pellegrino
- Eric Johnson
- Annie Shapero
- Raphael Sbarge
- Romi Shraiter
- Aaron Douglas
- David Hewlett
- James Wolk
- Dylan Arnold
- Josh Randall
- Chad Willett

=== Confirmed ===
- Ethan Slater as Thomas Godolkin

== Episodes ==
No.	Title	Directed by	Written by	Original release date
1	"Red Scare"	Sam Miller	Paul Grellong	2027

Further episodes were written by Grellong, Paul Keables, Sophia Lopez, Sheila Wilson, Matt Berns, Lauren Greer, and Jim Barnes, respectively.

== Production ==
=== Development ===
The series was announced at the 2024 San Diego Comic Con. Executive producers of the series are Paul Grellong, Eric Kripke, Seth Rogen, Evan Goldberg, James Weaver, Neal H. Moritz, Ori Marmur, Pavun Shetty, Ken Levin, Jason Netter, Garth Ennis, Darick Robertson, Michaela Starr, Jensen Ackles and Aya Cash. Grellong will serve as the series' showrunner. Production companies involved in producing the series are Sony Pictures Television, Amazon MGM Studios, Kripke Enterprises, Point Grey Pictures, and Original Film.

The series is designed to have multiple seasons. Grellong has already pitched ideas for a potential second season.

=== Writing ===
Kripke mentions that the Supes in the series are military people who move to the private sector that gets "flashier" because "it's about showmanship", so "military discipline" becomes "consumerism" to "see them evolve that way". Jensen Ackles spoke with Variety about the differences between his character Ben / Soldier Boy in this series and in The Boys, that even though they are the same person "There's a lot of life that Soldier Boy has lived when we see him in 'The Boys'...and then when he's starting." He mentioned that he's being able to "deal with the struggles that made him who he became."

=== Casting ===
Along with the series announcement, Jensen Ackles and Aya Cash were confirmed to star in the series as Ben / Soldier Boy and Klara Risinger / Stormfront, respectively, reprising their roles from The Boys. In March 2025, Elizabeth Posey and Will Hochman joined the cast in main roles. In August 2025, Jorden Myrie, Nicolò Pasetti, Ricky Staffieri, Brian J. Smith, Mason Dye and KiKi Layne were cast as series regulars. In October 2025, Cecily Strong, Mark Pellegrino, Eric Johnson, Annie Shapero, Raphael Sbarge, Romi Shraiter, Aaron Douglas, and David Hewlett joined the cast in recurring capacities. In March 2026, James Wolk, Dylan Arnold, Josh Randall, and Chad Willett were cast in recurring capacities.

Kripke mentioned that characters from other series of the franchise could appear in potential future seasons. In the first season, actors who reprise their roles from other series in the franchise are Ethan Slater as Thomas Godolkin from the second season of Gen V, and Dye as Bombsight from the fifth and final season of The Boys.

=== Design ===
The suits the Supes wear in the series are military ones which take their cues from USO shows. Laura Jean Shannon served as costume designer.

=== Filming ===
Principal photography began on August 17, 2025, and wrapped on March 11, 2026.

== Release ==
Vought Rising is expected to premiere on Amazon Prime Video in 2027.
