= Till We Meet Again (2016 film) =

- Directed by: Bank Tangjaitrong
- Written by: Johan Matton
- Screenplay by: Johan Matton & Alix Purcell
- Story by: Johan Matton
- Produced by: Johan Matton
- Starring: Johan Matton; Linnea Larsdotter; Emrhys Cooper; Vithaya Pansringarm
- Cinematography: Lance Kuhns & Travis Bleen
- Edited by: Max Tersch
- Music by: Dexter Britain
- Production companies: Changing Film Productions; Dream It Productions
- Distributed by: Factory Film Studio
- Release date: November 25, 2016
- Running time: 101 minutes
- Countries: United States; Thailand
- Languages: English; Thai
- Budget: $130,000

Till We Meet Again is a romantic adventure drama film directed by Thai filmmaker Bank Tangjaitrong and starring Johan Matton, Linnea Larsdotter, Emrhys Cooper, and Vithaya Pansringarm. Tangjaitrong's feature film debut, it was written and produced by Johan Matton, who also has a lead role. It won awards at several film festivals, including the Audience and Jury prizes at the Long Beach International Film Festival.

== Plot ==
Erik is a young writer unhealthily dependent on his girlfriend Joanna. With their relationship on the brink, they travel to Thailand to try to fix what's left of it, only to find themselves bitter and distant. Erik wanders through Thailand alone, battling his loneliness and his inability to take care of himself. Meanwhile, Joanna runs into and reconnects with her childhood friend, David. A chance encounter with three free-spirited backpackers opens up the world to Erik and changes his life.

== Cast ==
- Johan Matton as Erik
- Linnea Larsdotter as Joanna
- Emrhys Cooper as David
- Vithaya Pansringarm as Surachai
- Astrea Campbell-Cobb Miranda
- Timothy Ryan Hickernell as Jamie
- Elly Han as Cecile
- James Kacey as Sam
- Rachel Rossin as Laura

== Release ==
Till We Meet Again premiered in selected US theaters and video on demand on November 25, 2016,

== Reception ==
Till We Meet Again received positive reviews.
