= Sibat Tomarchio =

Soft drink beverage company based in Sicily, Italy

- Company type: Private
- Industry: Beverage
- Founded: 1920 (106 years ago) in Acireale, Sicily, Italy
- Founders: Filippo Tomarchio
- Headquarters: Acireale, Italy
- Area served: Worldwide
- Products: Soft drinks
- Revenue: ▲€12,1 millions (2017)
- Website: tomarchiobibite.it

Sibat Tomarchio, or more simply Tomarchio, is a soft drink beverage company based in Sicily, Italy.

== History ==
Tomarchio was founded in 1920 to produce and bottle soft drinks. The Cavalier Filippo Tomarchio, founder of the company, after numerous experiments, devised the recipe for crafting turbid soda (the original). The drink was enclosed in a 250 ml glass bottle that contained a small ball inside, hence the name "The soft drink with the ball".

Initially, the drink was sold door to door in wooden boxes, but only in the province of Catania. Starting in the 1960s, the distribution expands throughout Sicily: these are the years where the caps and bottles underwent the first changes, to keep up with the times. Between the 1980s and 1990s, new beverages such as orangeade, chinotto, lemonade, foam and others were born.

The following century Tomarchio consolidated its position in the market, the company is leader in own region for the production of beverages as chinotto, orangeade, lemonade, all based on Sicilian raw materials, but also cola drinks and still others. It was calculated (in 2015) that in the Sicilian market, Tomarchio sells 34.2% of the orangeade, 25.1% of the lemonade and even 51.3% of the chinotto. Tomarchio has created also a glass line and a bio line and, is present in the rest of Italy, in North America, Europe, Asia and Oceania.

== Beverage processing method ==
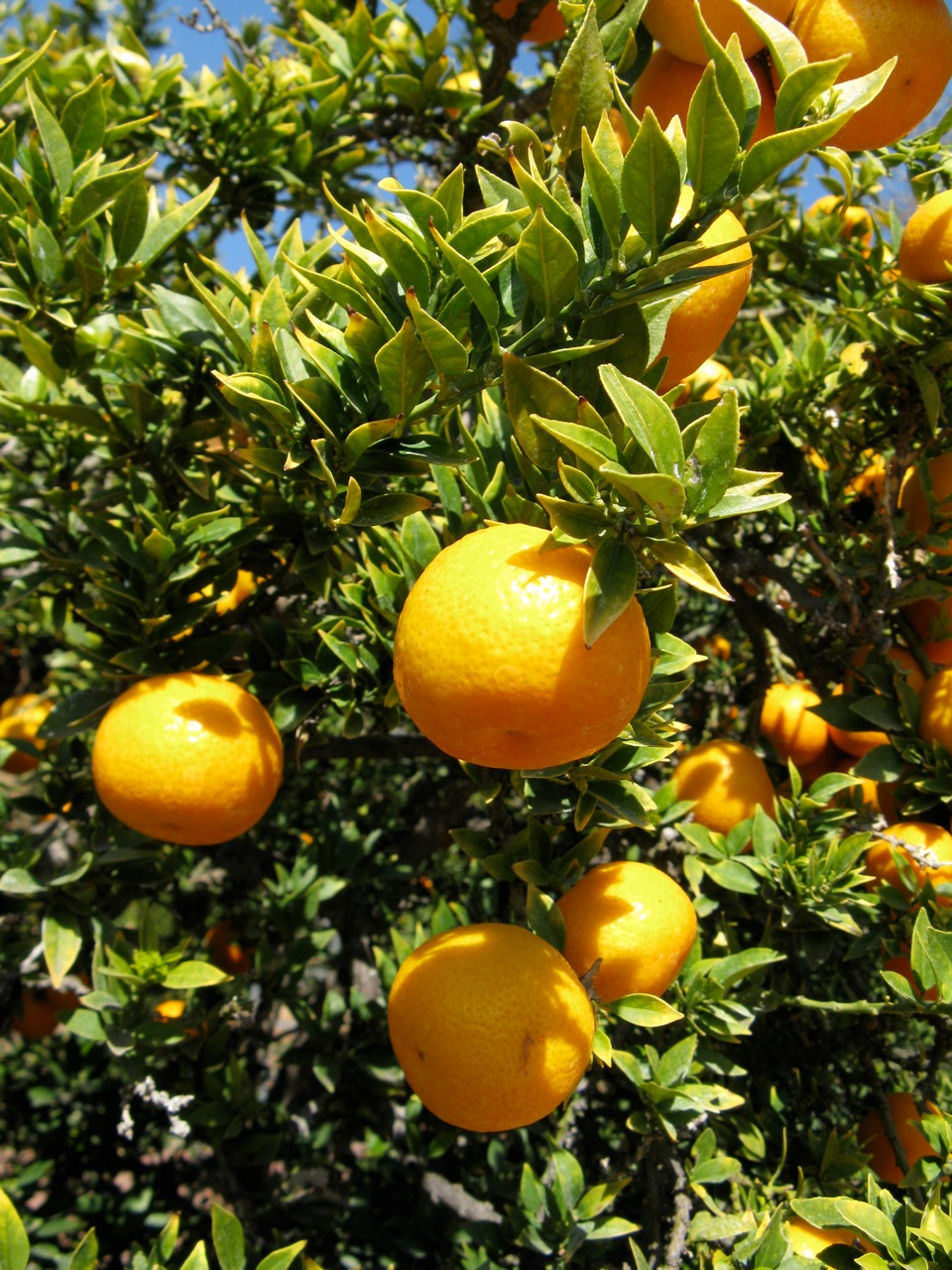
Chinotto

The Tomarchio company uses only Sicilian citrus juices, as Sicilian red oranges PGI, lemons from Syracuse PGI, blonde oranges from Ribera PDO and essential oils produced by local producers. The water comes from an Etna aquifer, and by filtering through the volcanic rocks it acquires a mineralization that characterizes the drinks.

== Projects for the valorization of Sicily ==
With a special label, the company has supported a crowdfunding platform, created to support charitable projects through donations from digital users. Sibat Tomarchio has been involved in several projects related to Sicilian territorial marketing such as the participation of the company in the Acireale Carnival. The company has decided to produce some bottles of drinks with a personalized label dedicated to Sicily's oldest Carnival, to promote the economy of the Sicilian region.

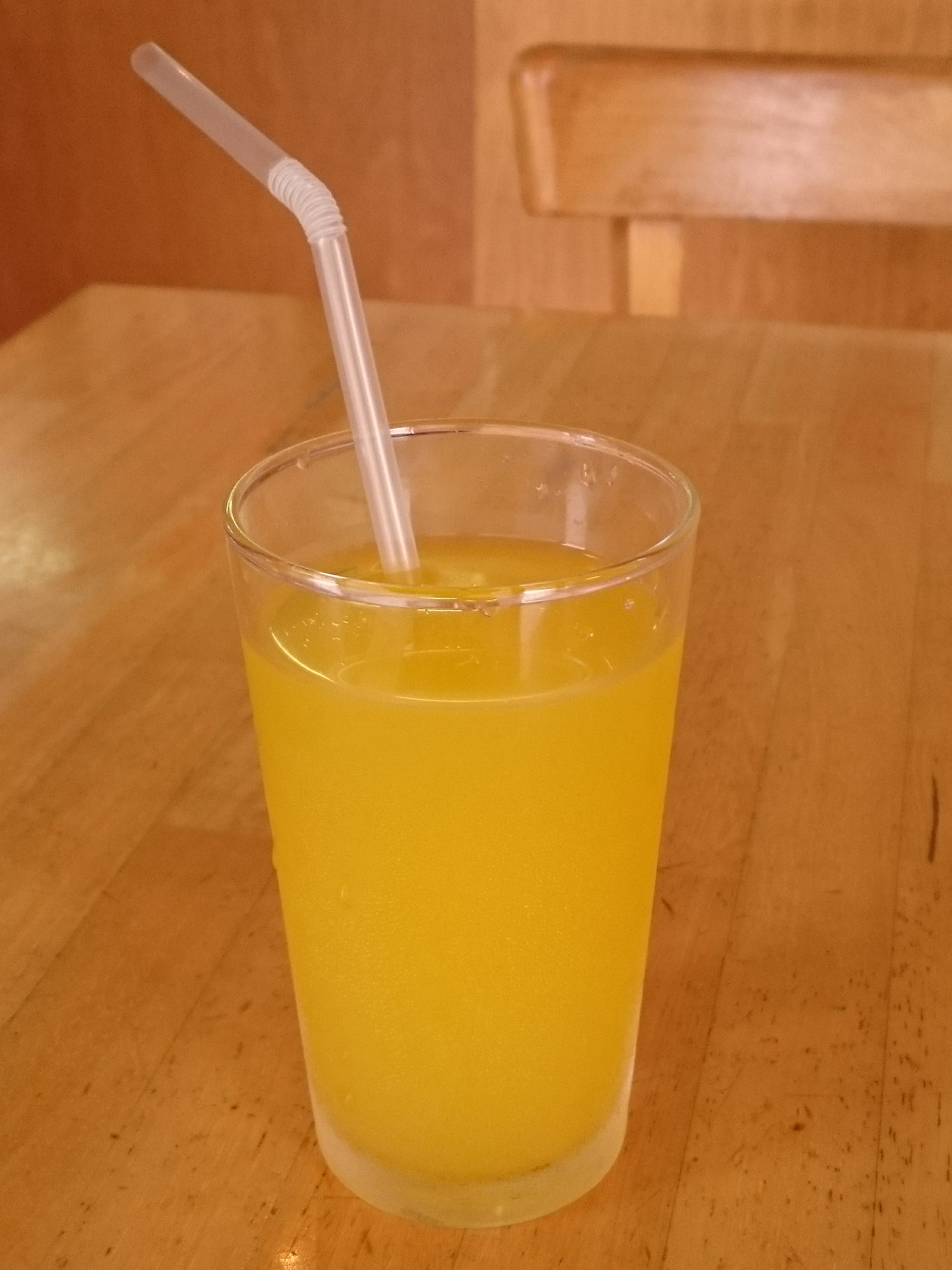
Glass of Sibat Tomarchio

== Famous testimonials ==
- Pippo Baudo
- Adriano Panatta

== Awards ==
=== BioAwards 2016 ===
In 2016 at the International trade show for organic and natural products "Sana" (Bologna):

- 1st place in the category "Bibite"
- 1st place in the category "Charity"

=== Gold Sofi Award 2019 ===
In 2019 to New York

- 1st place in the category "The best cold drink ready to drink"
