= The Shuroo Process =

- Poster
- Directed by: Emrhys Cooper
- Screenplay by: Donal Brophy; Emrhys Cooper
- Story by: Emrhys Cooper
- Produced by: Glen Trotiner; Benjamin J. Murray; Lynn Mancinelli; Donal Brophy; Emrhys Cooper
- Starring: Fiona Dourif; Donal Brophy; Tommy Dorfman; Emrhys Cooper; Rainey Qualley; Olivia Sui; Taylor Bagley; Cornelia Guest; Lynn Mancinelli; Jeff Burnett; Rachel McDowall; Jeff Hephner; Hakeem Kae-Kazim; Brad Dourif
- Cinematography: Benjamin J Murray
- Edited by: Gary M.B. Smith
- Music by: Bettina Bergström; Jonas W. Karlsson
- Production companies: EmCo Entertainment; Incline Productions
- Distributed by: Gravitas Ventures
- Release date: October 1, 2021 (Woodstock)
- Running time: 95 minutes
- Country: United States
- Language: English

The Shuroo Process is a 2021 American comedy-drama film directed by Emrhys Cooper (in his directorial debut), written by Cooper and Donal Brophy, produced by Glen Trotiner, Benjamin J. Murray, Lynn Mancinelli, Brophy, and Cooper, and starring Fiona Dourif, Brophy, Tommy Dorfman, Cooper, Rainey Qualley, Olivia Sui, Taylor Bagley, Cornelia Guest, Mancinelli, Jeff Burnett, Rachel McDowall, Jeff Hephner, Hakeem Kae-Kazim, and Brad Dourif. Zachary Quinto served as an executive producer of the film.

== Premise ==
When a successful NYC journalist Parker Schafer (Dourif), frustrated with the pressures of a failing publishing world and a less than promising romantic life, becomes infatuated by a wildly charismatic self-help guru (Brophy) it sends her on a journey of self-improvement with catastrophic consequences.

== Synopsis ==
A New York City journalist, frustrated with a failing publishing world and romantic life, is sent on a journey of self-improvement with catastrophic consequences. Driven by success and social status, Parker Schafer is thrown off the rails when her longtime boyfriend kicks her out of their apartment and returns to his ex-wife. Parker plunges into a drug fueled downward spiral, ruins her reputation, is fired and destroys her once glamorous life. Parker decides to try a wellness retreat, with the famed Guru Shuroo, in the Catskills. Over three days, a diverse group of unlikely friends are brought together through Shuroo’s guided meditation, yoga, and other more unorthodox healing methods: mescaline trips and fraud. Parker uncovers a damaging story that will expose Shuroo and have the power to put her back on top. But will she find redemption? The Shuroo Process explores the dangers of the self-help industry and what it is like to fall prey to its promises of transformation.

== Cast ==
- Fiona Dourif as Parker Schafer
- Donal Brophy as Declan Costigan
- Taylor Bagley as Seraphina
- Eric Roberts as himself
- Brad Dourif as Dr. Feinstein
- Emrhys Cooper as D'arcy
- Tommy Dorfman as Mark
- Rainey Qualley as Nadia
- Hakeem Kae-Kazim as Willie
- Olivia Sui as Nini
- Cornelia Guest as Jane
- Rachel McDowall as Edie
- Lynn Mancinelli as Stormy
- Jeff Hephner as Adrian

== Release ==
In September 2021, it was announced that Gravitas Ventures acquired North American distribution rights to the film, which premiered at the Woodstock Film Festival on October 1, 2021 and was released theatrically and on demand on November 24, 2021.

== Reception ==
Benjamin Franz of Film Threat gave the film an 8 out of 10 and wrote, "Ultimately, a showcase of acting and storytelling comes down to the strength of both the narrative and the performance. The Shuroo Process provides us with wonderful examples of both."
