= Emrhys Cooper =

British actor (born 1985)

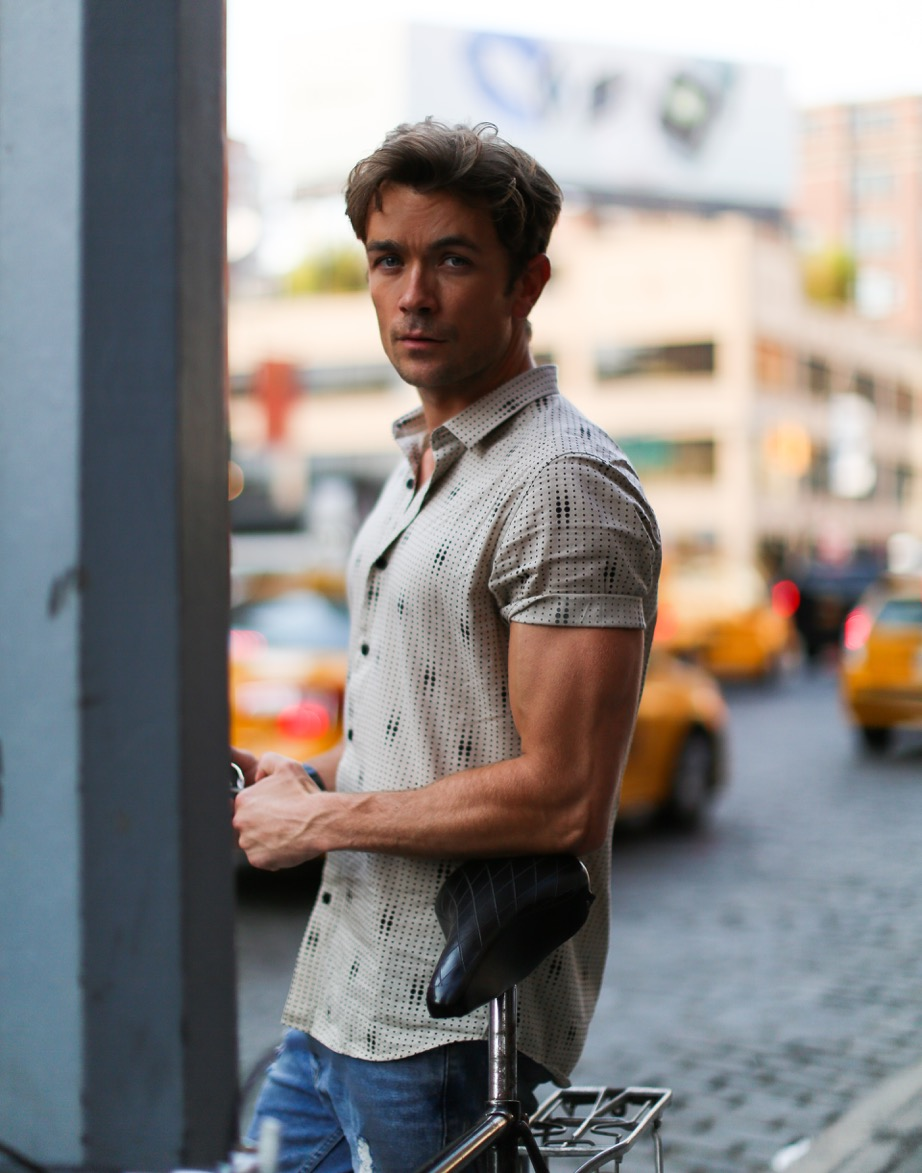
- Cooper in 2016
- Born: Emrhys Matthew Cooper; Totnes, Devon, England
- Occupations: Actor; filmmaker; singer; dancer

Emrhys Cooper is a British actor, filmmaker, singer, and dancer. He is best known for playing cult leader Rowan Cunliffe on Coronation Street, and Alastair on the Emmy nominated StyleHaul Drama Series Vanity (2015) in which he stars alongside Denise Richards and Karrueche Tran.

He has appeared in films such as Mamma Mia (2008), the romantic comedy Walk a Mile in My Pradas (2011), the indie drama Till We Meet Again (2016), the horror film Dreamcatcher, and his award-winning directorial debut The Shuroo Process.

== Early life, family, and education ==
Cooper was born in Devon, England. His father, Christopher, is a teacher and founder of the UK's South Devon Rudolf Steiner School. His mother, Raphaela, is an artist and former dancer.

He has an older sister called Fleur who runs a successful Travel and Lifestyle company and starred in the ITV series Million Dollar Babes.

Growing up, Cooper spent his free time training in dance, singing and acting. He started working professionally at the age of 12. He appeared in several UK TV shows and commercials.

He earned a scholarship to The Central School of Ballet, where he studied from the ages of 16–18. He then changed course and attended the prestigious Laine Theatre Arts School to pursue a career in musical theatre.

He graduated with honours at the age of 19.

== Career ==
=== 2005–2014 ===
Cooper made his professional stage debut in the national tour of Fame – the Musical before making his West End debut at 21 in the Queen musical We Will Rock You.

In addition to appearing in West End musicals, Cooper also worked as a dancer with many of the world's biggest recording artists including Madonna, Christina Aguilera, Pussycat Dolls and the Sugababes, appearing as the first of the three men in the video for 'Push the Button'. Whilst dancing, Cooper appeared on TV shows such as X Factor, America's Got Talent, Stars in Their Eyes and the MTV European Music Awards.

Cooper has made several appearances on British television, I'd Do Anything and 999 Lifesavers. His on-screen debut was in Mamma Mia! in 2008.

In 2008, he moved to Los Angeles where he quickly started working on many of the US's biggest shows including Desperate Housewives, CSI:NY, Touch and Blackish. He played an integral role on the hit prime time network TV series Person of Interest playing MI6 spy Young Greer. The elder John Greer is portrayed by the British actor John Nolan (uncle of Christopher Nolan).

Cooper has also had a string of independent movies such as Walk a Mile in My Pradas, Paint, Dreamcatcher, and Till We Meet Again

In 2013, Cooper was cast as the lead role in the Bhutanese feature film Kushuthara – Pattern of Love, filmed in the Kingdom of Bhutan. Cooper is the first ever Western actor to star in a Bhutanese film. 'Kushuthara' went on to garner wins at international film festivals and Cooper was awarded outstanding performance from a leading actor in the IndieFest film festival.

Notable US stage work includes the Dream It Productions critically acclaimed production of Entertaining Mr Sloane. Cooper won several awards for his portrayal of "Sloane" including being voted "Person to Watch" by Broadway World.

=== 2015–present ===
Cooper landed the lead role in the remake of the classic silent horror film Nosferatu, playing the role of Thomas Hutter.

The film also stars Doug Jones in the iconic role of Count Orlok. Other cast includes Joely Fisher and Sarah Carter.

In 2023, Cooper appeared as the Cowboy The Bents highly acclaimed production of Mart Crowley's The Boys in the Band at the Camelot Theatre, Palm Springs.

=== 2018–present: Directorial focus ===
In 2018, Cooper made his directorial debut in the viral short film Trophy Boy which had its world premiere at the Cannes Film Festival, and is currently being developed into a TV series. Cooper made his feature film directorial debut in the critically acclaimed The Shuroo Process, which he also wrote and produced.

== Music ==
In 2013, Cooper co-wrote and released his debut single "Hypnotized" through Inspire U records. The song played on many of the UK's major stations. The song can be heard in the feature film Kushuthara: Pattern of Love.

In 2016 he released the single "Reboot My Heart", which he co wrote with his songwriting partner Elaine Macaulso. Cooper also directed the music video shot in Bangkok and Ko Tao – Thailand.

== Humanitarian work ==
In February 2016, whilst shooting The Temple in Bhutan, Cooper visited the Neyphug (Heyphug) Monastery & School for orphaned and underprivileged boys. The site had been severely hit by an earthquake. Neyphug is a charitable organisation that supports a monk community with a 450-year Buddhist history in the Kingdom of Bhutan.

Cooper also created a public service announcement after losing his song writing partner, Elaine Macaluso, to urethral cancer. He supports Urology Care Foundation, hoping to build awareness and urge people to get regular health check ups.

Cooper is also passionate about protecting wildlife and creating a healthy planet with WWF and Greenpeace. Cooper shares his home with 3 rescued cats and an African grey parrot.

== Filmography ==
Film
| Year | Title | Role | Notes |
|---|---|---|---|
| 2008 | Mamma Mia! | Stag | |
| 2010 | Walk a Mile in My Pradas | Michael | Also credited as "executive producer" |
| 2018 | The Price for Silence | Lucas Flynn | Won Best Supporting Actor at the International Film Festival of Wales |
| 2021 | Dreamcatcher | Brecken | |
| 2021 | The Shuroo Process | D'arcy | Also director, producer and screenwriter |

Television
| Year | Title | Role | Notes |
|---|---|---|---|
| 2008 | I'd Do Anything | Himself | Performer, 5 episodes |
| 2008 | America's Got Talent | Himself | Dance, 9 episodes |
| 2008 | The X Factor | Himself | Dancer |
| 2008 | CSI: NY | Vincent Wright | Guest, "The Cost of Living episode. Credited as "Emrhys Matthew Cooper" |
| 2012 | Desperate Housewives | Richard | "Who Can Say What's True?" episode |
| 2014 | Person of Interest | young John Greer | "The Cold War" episode |
| 2015 | Breaking Hollywood: One Actor at a Time | Guy | 3 episodes |
| 2015 | Vanity | Alistair | 10 episode |
| 2016 | Relationship Status | Henry | 1 episode |
| 2018 | Entanglement | Sam | |
| 2019 | Real Royals | Henry Myerscough | |
| 2024 | The Lair: OnlyFangs | Landon Scott | |
| 2024 | Coronation Street | Rowan Cunliffe | Regular role |
