= Radio Company =

American collaborative rock band

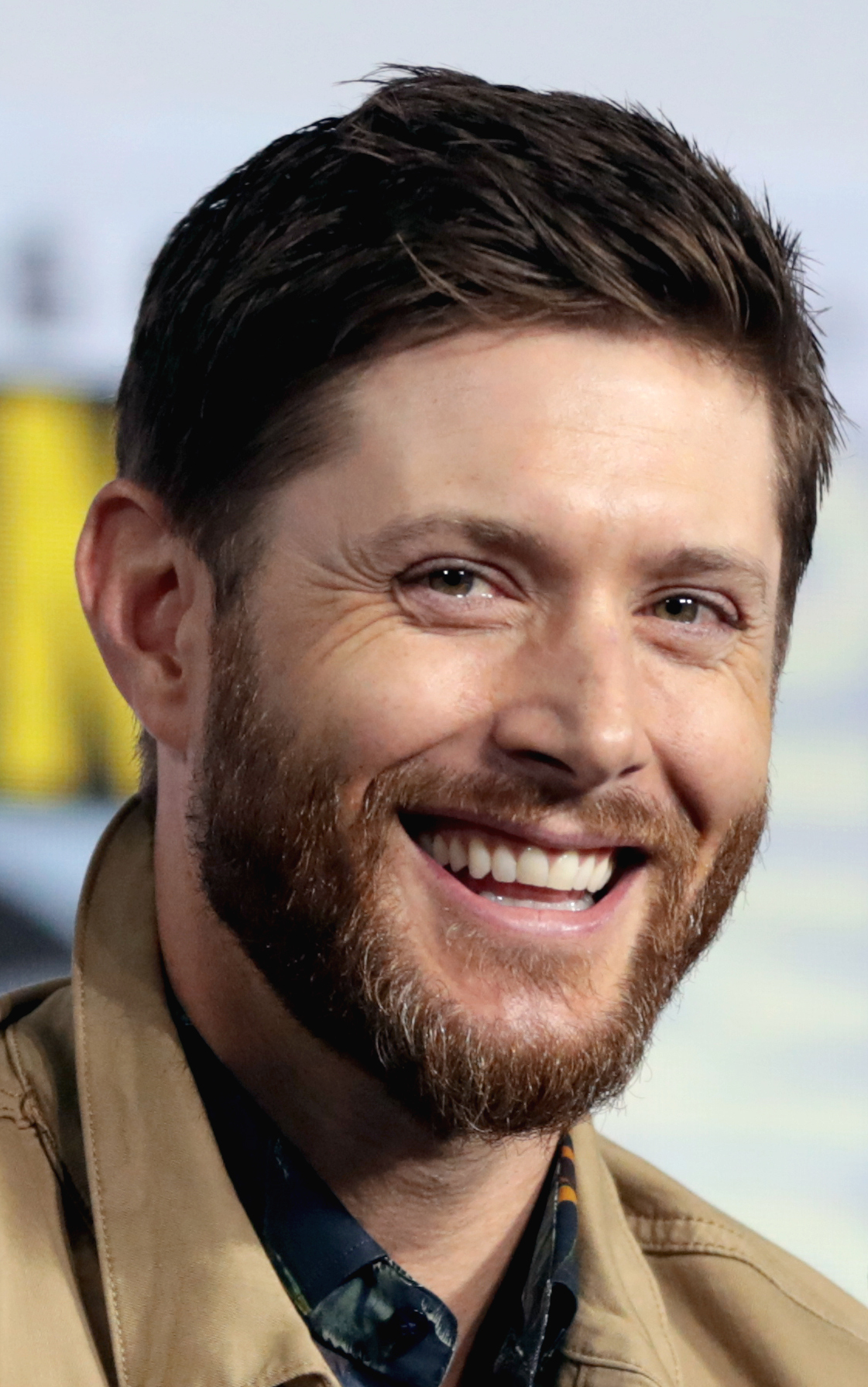
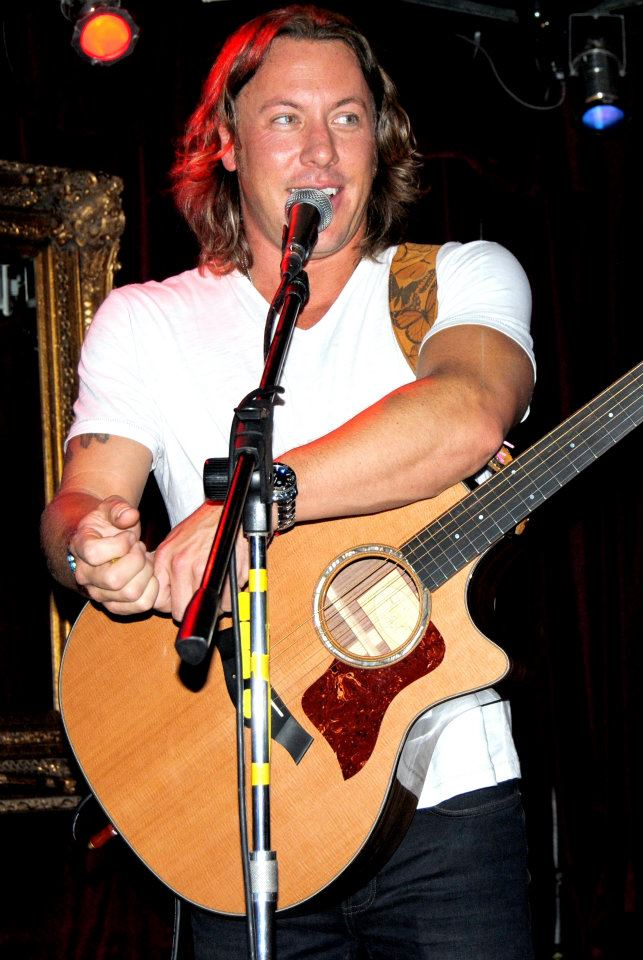
- Jensen Ackles Steve Carlson

Background information
- Origin: Austin, Texas
- Genres: Rock; country
- Years active: 2018–present
- Label: Two Chair Entertainment
- Members: Jensen Ackles; Steven Carlson
- Website: https://radiocomusic.com/

Radio Company is an American collaborative rock band formed by actor and singer-songwriter Jensen Ackles and singer-songwriter Steve Carlson.

The band has released three studio albums, Vol. 1 (2019), Vol. 2 (2021) and Keep On Ramblin' (2023), as well as one live album, Live From Nashville (2023).

== History ==
=== Early history ===
Radio Company was formed in 2018 in Austin, Texas, by Jensen Ackles and Steve Carlson. The two artists have been friends for years and have collaborated previously. Ackles and Carlson were originally roommates when they began writing together, and had previously collaborated on Carlson's 2003 album Rollin' On, his 2007 Christmas EP An Auld School Christmas and his 2012 album Different Town.

=== Vol. 1 and Vol. 2 (2018 – 2021) ===
After officially forming in 2018, the duo began writing their first album, Vol. 1. The lead single from the album, "Sounds of Someday", was released on October 18 2019, with the album being released on November 8 2019. The album performed well on the charts, peaking at No. 1 on the US Billboard Heatseekers chart, No. 2 on the Billboard Independent Albums chart, No. 151 on the US Billboard 200 and No. 18 on the US Top Rock Albums chart.

On April 2 2021, the band released "City Grown Willow", the first single from their second album. This was followed by a second single, "Quarter To", on April 9. Their second album, Vol. 2, was released on May 7, 2021, peaking at No. 16 on the US Billboard Heatseekers chart and No. 49 on the Billboard Top Album Sales chart.

=== Keep On Ramblin' and Live From Nashville (2022 – 2023) ===
In February 2022, the band announced they were working on a third album.

Radio Company played their debut live performance in Nashville on December 19, 2022, at Analog at Hutton Hotel, where they debuted "Every Light" from their forthcoming third album. Keep On Ramblin' was released on February 24, 2023.

On June 15, 2023, Radio Company announced that the Nashville performance was being pressed for their first live album release. A 17-track double album, titled Live From Nashville was released on November 24, 2023.

=== Continued live performances (2024 – present) ===
The band has continued to play live since 2024, mostly at conventions. In August 2024, they played two nights at Sagebrush, a live music venue in Austin, Texas; the performances were broadcast online for fans who could not attend.

== Discography ==
=== Studio albums ===
- Vol. 1 (2019)
- Vol. 2 (2021)
- Keep On Ramblin' (2023)

=== Live albums ===
- Live From Nashville (2023)
