= Life Weaver =

2012 survival horror video game

- Developer: BGG Productions
- Publisher: BGG Productions
- Platform: Windows
- Release: January 10, 2012
- Genres: Action, Survival Horror
- Mode: Single Player

Life Weaver is an action and survival horror video game published and developed by American studio BGG Productions. The game was released on January 10, 2012 for PC, and it is playable via optical disc. The single-player game was rated M for Mature by the ESRB for containing blood and gore, intense violence and strong language.

== Gameplay ==
Players control a group of party members that can be interchanged with other characters outside of battle. Players begin the game with only the main protagonist Celeste as a playable characters, but more characters will become playable as the player progresses through the game. The combat system is a modernized version of the turn-based battle system used in many older role-playing video games. Players will gain experience points upon winning a battle, and characters will level up to become stronger and gain new abilities when they have obtained enough experience points. Money and items can also be received upon successfully completing a battle.

Players will travel to many different towns during the course of the game. Towns act as a safe haven for players where items can be bought or sold, and characters can rest to regain their strength. Some towns will contain missions that players can unlock by talking to NPCs, and mini games can be played in certain towns as well.

Most missions in the game take place inside of a dungeon, cave, forest or other type of dark area inhabited by monsters. Battles can occur in these areas by either walking up to a monster or by having a monster walk up to you. Some battles in the game are predetermined and cannot be avoided. There are a variety of monsters in the game ranging from the common bumblebee to the ferocious Helfen. There are also boss battles such as one of your many encounters with Santa Claus.

== Synopsis ==
=== Setting ===
Much of Life Weaver's setting, plot and storyline is adapted from author Amanda Dyar's published short story Broken Light. The video game is set in an unspecified time period, although it appears to be an alternate present where some technologies have flourished, while others, such as the automobile, were never invented. The events in the game take place 100 years after the first Life Weaver foretold a prophecy about an approaching darkness and the one mortal woman who had the power to stop the darkness. The story of Life Weaver takes place on an unnamed planet constructed of three primary kingdoms and a province called The North Pole, similar to the North Pole in our own society. The game also features an alternate plane of existence that is home to the Life Weavers known as Coelum where there are many beautiful palaces, and magic thrives over technology.

Life Weaver begins with the young Daniels couple going about their daily lives in a rural area of the Kingdom of Dalastria. Dalastria's chief export is farmed goods, so the kingdom is naturally littered with many different farms and small towns, although the capital city is quite large and highly populated. Soon after the game begins, the couple makes their way to the Kingdom of Hadrion, the largest kingdom of the three which features The Mantra Research Facility. Hadrion is the most populated of all the kingdoms, and there are many large buildings sitting within the city, and vendors can be seen on every street corner selling their goods and services. The Mantra Research Facility lies within the heart of Hadrion, and it is large enough to house a small community within its walls. The third kingdom is an enormous mining colony located in the world's largest mountain expansion. Little is known about the kingdom, because the place does not take kindly to outsiders, and few citizens bother leaving the kingdom for any reason. The North Pole is similar to what you'd hear in children's Christmas story, complete with elves, reindeer and Santa Claus himself. However, the cheery atmosphere is just a front for a much darker and evil plot. There are many other small towns, dungeons and other explorable environments located within the world of Life Weaver that players must venture through in order to beat the game as well.

=== Plot ===
Two Life Weavers, Zerion and Zane are discussing strategies for an upcoming confrontation with the darkness. The key to their plans is finding a young woman named Celeste Daniels, who has been foretold to be the savior of Coelum from the darkness. Meanwhile, Celeste and her husband Anthony are going about their daily routine unaware of the impending danger. Celeste has a dream about the approaching darkness and the world she must save. The couple head to the Kingdom of Hadrion the next day for Anthony to find a job at The Mantra Research Facility. After Anthony attains his new job, he comes up missing, and Celeste will do anything to see her husband again.

Life Weaver then shows the progression of the story through two perspectives, that of Anthony's who has been teleported to The North Pole and Celeste who is traveling the three kingdoms looking for any sign of Anthony. Celeste encounters many allies and enemies during her travels, and eventually masters her powers she had never known she possessed before her journey began. Celeste finally learns of Anthony's true whereabouts, and she pursues her husband in the same way he ended up in his current location. At the same time, Anthony learns of a sinister plot put in motion by the evil Santa Claus and his elf minions to destroy the world. After Celeste's long journey and Anthony's struggle for survival, the couple reunites and faces off in a final confrontation with the evil elf headmaster.

== Development ==
BGG Productions officially announced the release of Life Weaver on January 10, 2012. Life Weaver was first mentioned in a print newspaper in Alabama where the game was developed.

== Reception ==
Life Weaver has received many positive reviews. The HorrorNews.net article claimed that, "If you're a fan of old-style RPGs, or simply just a fan of fun games with great storylines, Life Weaver is for you." The game also received two thumbs up from Gaming Podcast for its sense of classic gameplay and storytelling mixed with modern advancements in both graphics and gameplay mechanics.
