= Bridgetta Tomarchio =

American actress and model

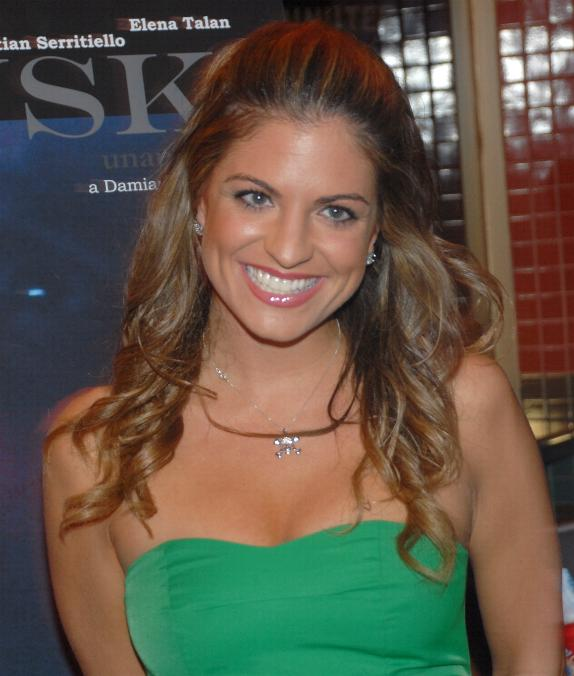
- Tomarchio in 2008
- Born: December 25, 1978 (age 47); Baltimore, Maryland, U.S.
- Occupations: Actress, model
- Years active: 1990–present
- Website: www.bridgetta.com

Bridgetta Tomarchio (born December 25, 1978) is an American actress and model.

== Early life ==
She was born on Christmas Day in Baltimore, Maryland, to parents Mary and Joe. She was raised in nearby Ellicott City.

== Career ==
Tomarchio is perhaps best known for being the spokesperson for ExtenZe infomercials. Aside from this, she has made various film and television appearances, including: The West Wing, Going to California, Entourage, Californication, Walk a Mile in My Pradas, and The Ideal Husband.

== Filmography ==
=== Film ===
Year	Title	Role	Notes
2001	Domestic Disturbance	Officer Fox	Uncredited
2003	Everything's Wonderful	Bar Girl #1	
2005	The Dying Gaul	Female Guest	Uncredited
2005	Lords of Dogtown	Party Girl	Uncredited
2008	Kinescoping Dr. Travis	Chanel	
2008	Garden Party	Lady Luck	Uncredited
2008	Primitive Recall	Sarah	
2010	The Mansion Directive	Syndi	
2011	Walk a Mile in My Pradas	Gina	
2011	6 Nonsmokers	Dr. Regina Powell	
2014	Neighbors	Sorority Girl	Uncredited

=== Television ===
Year	Title	Role	Notes
2000	The West Wing	Reporter	Episode: "What Kind of Day Has It Been"
2001	Judging Amy	Office Assistant	Episode: "The Last Word"
2001, 2002	Going to California	Friend #1	2 episodes
2003	Trash to Cash with John DiResta	Contestant #2	Episode: "Bachelor Pad"
2004	Entourage	Model	Episode: "Date Night"
2005	The True Story of Alexander the Great	Olympias	Television documentary
2006	Poorman's Bikini Beach	Various roles	2 episodes
2007	The Bronx Is Burning	Roxy	Episode: "Time for a Change?"
2007	Jimmy Kimmel Live!	Axe Body Angel	Episode #5.53
2008	Now That's Sketchy!	Ketchup Mom	Episode #1.3
2009	Eager Beavers	Bridgetta	Television film
2009	The Storm	Flight Assistant	Episode: "Part I"
2009	Californication	Veronica	Episode: "The Apartment"
2011	The Ideal Husband	Paula	Television film
2012	Scared Yet?	Katie	Episode: "What Was That?"
