= Creative Differences Productions =

American film and television production company

Creative Differences Productions, Inc.
- Formerly: Termite Art Productions (1995–2004)
- Company type: Privately held company
- Industry: Film production; Television production
- Founded: 1995; 31 years ago (as Termite Art Productions); March 22, 2004; 21 years ago (as Creative Differences Productions)
- Founder: Erik Nelson
- Headquarters: Pasadena, California, United States
- Key people: Erik Nelson (CEO)
- Products: Feature films; Television programs
- Parent: Lionsgate (1998–2004)
- Website: www.cdtvfilms.com

Creative Differences Productions, Inc. (formerly known as Termite Art Productions from 1995 to 2004) is an American film and television production company that is headquartered in Pasadena, California and was founded in 1995 by Erik Nelson.

== History ==
The company was founded in 1995 as Termite Art Productions by Erik Nelson, initially producing reality and documentary television shows and specials including Ripley's Believe It or Not!, Unsolved History, Incredible Vacation Videos and More Than Human.

On June 19, 1998, Lions Gate Media, the division of the upstart Canadian entertainment company Lions Gate Entertainment acquired Termite Art for $2.75 million.

In 2002, Termite Art formed a new division, the Format Farm.

On March 22, 2004, the company spun-off from Lions Gate and renamed as Creative Differences Productions, Inc., the company expanded into film production in 2005 with Werner Herzog's Grizzly Man, and followed this up in 2007 with the Oscar nominated Encounters at the End of the World.

Despite the 2004 spin-off and renaming as Creative Differences Productions, Lionsgate retained the rights to some Termite Art and Creative Differences television shows and specials.

== Television programs ==
=== Termite Art Productions ===
- What's So Funny? (1995)
- Cyberlife (1996)
- Amazing Science (1998)
- Too Extreme (1998)
- Speed Demons (1999)
- Incredible Vacation Videos (1999–2002)
- Ripley's Believe It or Not! (2000–2003, co-production with Angry Dragon Entertainment and Columbia TriStar Television)
- Great Streets (2000)
- Tourist Traps (2000–2002)
- 24 Hours in Hotel Hell (2001)
- 30 Roller Coasters in 24 Hours? (2001)
- Celebrity Undercover (2001)
- Amazing Animal Videos (2001–2002)
- Amazing Baby Videos (2002–2003)
- What Were You Thinking? (2002–2003)
- Unsolved History (2002–2005)
- More Than Human (2003)
- The Brini Maxwell Show (2003)

=== Creative Differences Productions ===
- Cheating Death (2004)
- Science of the Bible (2005)
- Mega Disasters (2006–2008)
- GI Factory (2006)
- Everything You Need to Know (2006)
- Prehistoric Predators (2007)
- Best Evidence (2007–2008)
- Time Warp (2008–2009)
- Escape to Chimp Eden (2008)
- After the Attack (2008)
- Monsters Resurrected (2009–2010)
- Blood Dolphins (2010)
- Dinosaur Revolution (2011)
- On Death Row (2012)
- The 80s: The Decade That Made Us (2013)
- The Strange Truth (2016)

== Feature films ==
- Encounters at the End of the World (2007)
- Dreams with Sharp Teeth (2008)
- Cave of Forgotten Dreams (2010)
- Into the Abyss (2011)
- Dinotasia (2012)
- The Cold Blue (2018)
- Apocalypse '45 (2020)

== Television specials and films ==
=== Termite Art Productions ===
- The World's Most Dangerous Animals (1996)
- Area 51: The Real Story (1997)
- When Good Times Go Bad (1997)
- Doomsday: We Can You Do? (1997)
- Busted on the Job: Caught on Tape (1997)
- UFOs over Phoenix (1997)
- Our Favorite Toys (1997)
- The Science of Magic (1997)
- When Good Times Go Bad 2 (1998)
- Busted on the Job 2 (1998)
- The Ku Klux Klan: A Secret History (1998)
- Unit 731: Nightmare in Manchuria (1998)
- Extreme Rides 1998 (1998)
- More Favorite Toys (1998)
- Busted Everywhere: Caught On Tape (1999)
- When Good Times Go Bad 3 (1999)
- Busted on the Job 3 (1999)
- High Rollers: A History of Gambling in America (2000)
- Extreme Rides 2000 (2000)
- The Bataan Death Match (2000)
- The Making of a Coaster (2000)
- UFOs over Illinois (2000)
- Nazi America: A Secret History (2000)
- When Chefs Attack (2001)
- Mystery of the 364th (2001)
- Street Gangs: A Secret History (2001)
- World's Largest Amusement Park (2001)
- Return to Area 51 (2002)
- Crop Circles (2002)
- Deadly Bugs II (2002)
- Deadly Reptiles 2 (2002)
- Extreme Rides 2002 (2002)
- Top 10 Coasters 2002 (2002)
- Nostradamus: The Final Word (2002)
- Big Bucks: The Press Your Luck Scandal (2003)
- Extreme Rides 2003 (2003)
- The Science of Magic 2 (2003)
- Monsters: Put to the Test (2003)
- Thrill Rides: Put to the Test (2003)
- Dive to Bermuda Triangle (2004)

=== Creative Differences Productions ===
- How It Was: Voices of 9/11 (2007)
- Nazi Death Squad (2009)
- JFK: The Ruby Connection (2009)
- Wild on Tape (2009)
- Hitler's Hidden Holocaust (2009)
- When Animals Bite Back (2011)
- Sharkzilla (2012)
- Monster Squid: The Giant is Real (2013)
- A Gray State (2017)
