= Memphis Belle =

Memphis Belle may refer to:

- Memphis Belle (aircraft), a United States Army Air Forces Boeing B-17 Flying Fortress used in World War II
- Memphis Belles, a women's professional tackle football team

== Films ==
- Memphis Belle: A Story of a Flying Fortress, a 1944 documentary film about the real aircraft and crew on its final mission
- Memphis Belle (film), a 1990 fictional film inspired by the 1944 documentary
