= David Crowley (disambiguation) =

David Crowley is the governor elect of Wisconsin.

David Crowley may also refer to:

- David H. Crowley (1882–1951), Michigan attorney general
- David Crowley, filmmaker whose death was documented in the 2017 film A Gray State
- David L. Crowley (fl. 1979), Lebanese-born American actor
