= Prehistoric Predators =

2007 American TV series

- Promotional poster
- Genre: Television documentary
- Narrated by: Chip Bolcik; Roger Tilling
- Country of origin: United States
- Original language: English
- No. of episodes: 7

Production
- Running time: 48 minutes
- Production company: Creative Differences Productions

Original release
- Network: National Geographic
- Release: August 19 – November 7, 2007

Prehistoric Predators is a 2007 National Geographic Channel program based on different predators that lived in the Cenozoic era, including Smilodon and C. megalodon. The series investigated how such beasts hunted and fought other creatures, and what drove them to extinction.

== Production ==
The producers enlisted the help of Chuck Ciampaglio, a geology professor at Wright State University–Lake Campus, to create a model illustrate a shark's jaws. Filming of the episode involving Ciampaglio took place on the university campus in 2008.

== Reception ==
Brad Newsome of The Age praised the series for its "lovely computer animations [that] bring several species of these 'terror birds' to life". The Advertiser said the series "shows amazing animations of the shark". According to The Times, in Prehistoric Predators, "Scientists—ably assisted by the prerequisite CGI—recreate some of the most fearsome predators of old", including the Megalodon and the Terror Bird.

== Featured animals ==
- Pleistocene: 1.8 million-10,000 years ago

North America:
Smilodon fatalis, dire wolf, short-faced bear, American lion, Bison antiquus, Mexican horse, Columbian mammoth, Megalonyx, gray wolf (cameo), grizzly bear (cameo), early humans

- Miocene-Pliocene: 15-3 million years ago

South America, North America:
Kelenken, Parapropalaehoplophorus, Homalodotherium, Titanis, Canis edwardii, Smilodon gracilis, Neohipparion

- Miocene-Pleistocene: 20-2 million years ago

The Atlantic:
C. megalodon, Cetotherium, Squalodon, dugong, great white shark (cameo), green sea turtle (cameo)

- Oligocene-Miocene: 32-19 million years ago

North America:
Archaeotherium, Hyaenodon, Dinictis, Mesohippus, Poebrotherium, Subhyracodon, Moropus, Merycoidodon, Daeodon, Amphicyon

== Episodes ==
No.	Title	Original release date
1	"Sabertooth"	2007
Smilodon fatalis is shown as an apex predator. It is depicted defeating dire wolves, living in prides and killing Bison antiquus, and baby mammoths.
2	"Dire Wolf"	2007
The savage dire wolf was the largest dog on the planet at the time. It is shown chasing off lone Smilodons and faceing off with short-faced bears and hunting down Bison antiquus and Mexican horses in large packs.
3	"Giant Bear"	2007
Arctodus simus, the giant short-faced bear, was one of the largest mammalian carnivore ever to walk the Earth. The bear is shown defeating Smilodon fatalis and Megalonyx, trying to take down Mexican horses, scaring off dire wolves, and even coming into contact with early humans
4	"Monster Shark"	2007
The huge, powerful shark C. megalodon is shown subsisting on a diet of whales.
5	"Terror Raptor"	2007
The huge terror birds of South and North America, Kelenken and Titanis, are both shown as apex predators. Kelenken is shown to eat Homalodotherium, glyptodonts, and rodents, and Titanis is shown coming into competition with additional predators Smilodon gracilis and Canis edwardii, and is also shown to eat horses.
6	"Killer Pig"	2007
Archaeotherium was the largest and most powerful beast of the badlands until the bear dogs arrived, and is depicted evolving into the even larger Daeodon (or Dinohyus) in order to survive against the new threat.
7	"Razor Jaws"	2007
The only animal who would attack an Archaeotherium was Hyaenodon, with its powerful razor jaws, until bear dogs arrived on the continent, driving both to extinction.

== Related series ==
- When Dinosaurs Roamed America
- Monsters Resurrected
- Monsters We Met
