= Erik Nelson (filmmaker) =

American filmmaker and television producer

- Occupations: filmmaker and television producer

Erik Nelson is an American documentary film director and television producer. Nelson has produced and directed several films, television specials and television programs such as Ripley's Believe It or Not!, Mega Disasters, When Good Times Go Bad, What Were You Thinking?, Unsolved History, Prehistoric Predators and More than Human.

He has a production company called Creative Differences Productions (formerly known as Termite Art Productions), owned by Lionsgate from 1998 to 2004.

In 2008 he released a documentary he produced and directed, about prolific and controversial author Harlan Ellison, entitled Dreams with Sharp Teeth. Nelson started working on this film in 1981. The film included interviews with many respected collaborators and admirers of Ellison.

Nelson collaborated with Werner Herzog on several films. He produced Grizzly Man, a film Herzog directed about an eccentric naturalist who wanted to live with grizzly bears. In 2016, Herzog executive produced A Gray State, a film Nelson directed about an eccentric American veteran and aspiring film-maker, David Crowley, who was admired by fans of Alex Jones, whose death triggered conspiracy theories.

In 2017, Nelson uncovered and reversioned 15 hours of World War II footage, filmed by respected Hollywood director William Wyler, of the 8th Air Force to create a new documentary entitled The Cold Blue. This film premiered at the AFI Film Festival in June 2018, and was the first of the theatrical documentary genre Nelson has referred to as “Big Screen History”. Other films released later that year in this genre included Peter Jackson's "They Shall Not Grow Old" and Todd Miller's "Apollo 11".

In 2020, Nelson completed and theatrically released “Apocalypse '45.” Another example of "Big Screen History", this film documents the final year of the war in the Pacific in 1945, and was released on Discovery+ on May 27, 2021.

On October 9, 2024, to coincide with Lennon's birthday, Nelson's film, Daytime Revolution, a feature documentary that revolves around the week in 1972 when John Lennon and Yoko Ono took over the Mike Douglas Show, was released in theaters across America.
