= Memphis Belle (aircraft) =

Boeing B-17F bomber

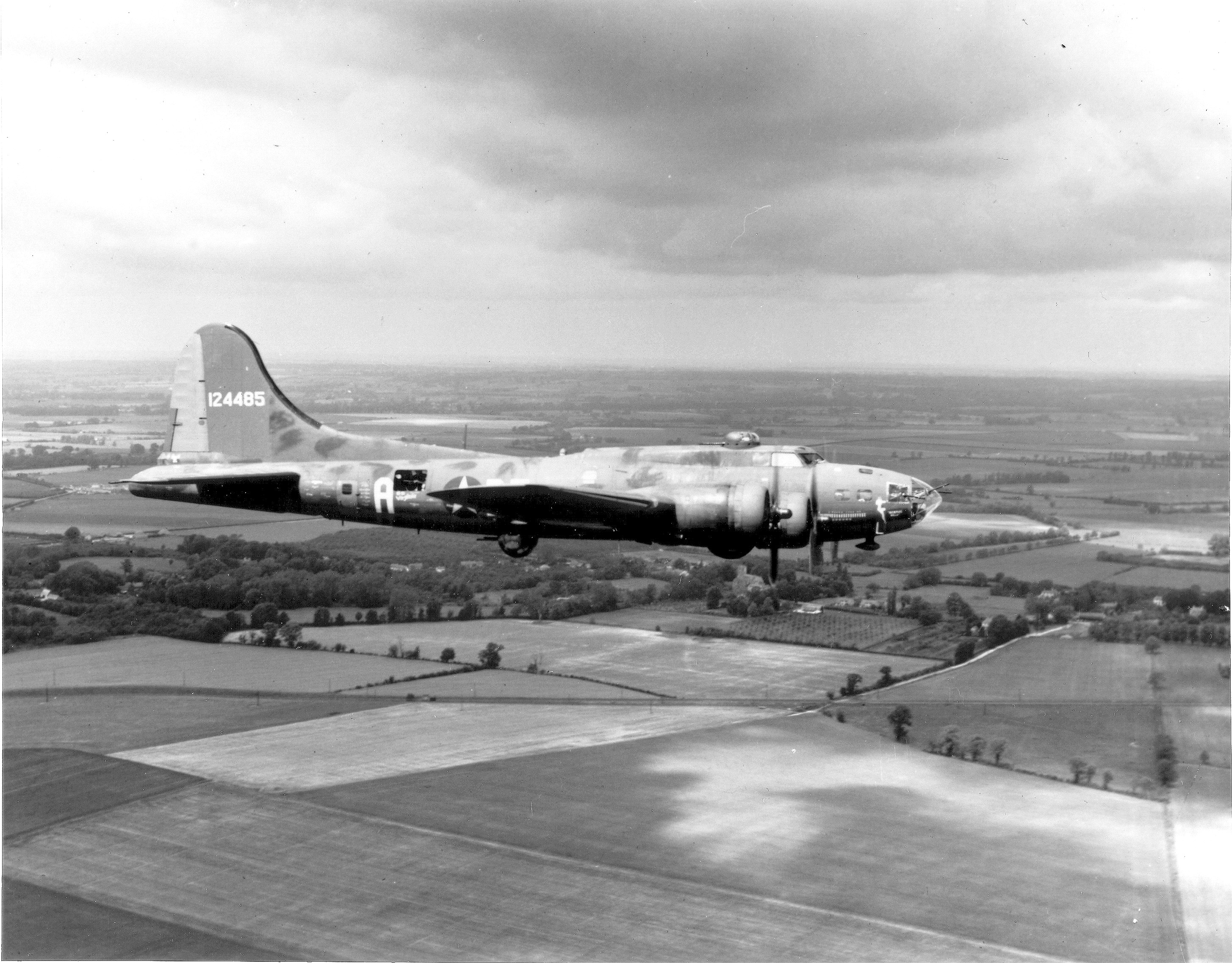
- Boeing B-17F Flying Fortress, Memphis Belle, 324th Bomb Squadron, 91st Bomb Group, 9 June 1943

General information
- Type: Boeing B-17F Flying Fortress
- Manufacturer: Boeing Aircraft Company
- Status: On display
- Owners: United States Army Air Forces
- Construction number: 3170
- Serial: 41-24485
- Radio code: DF-A

History
- Preserved at: National Museum of the United States Air Force

The Memphis Belle is a Boeing B-17F Flying Fortress used during the Second World War that inspired the making of two motion pictures: a 1944 documentary film, Memphis Belle: A Story of a Flying Fortress, and the 1990 Hollywood feature film Memphis Belle. It was one of the first United States Army Air Forces (USAAF) B-17 heavy bombers to complete 25 combat missions, after which the aircrew returned with the bomber to the United States to sell war bonds.

In 2005 restoration began on the Memphis Belle at the National Museum of the United States Air Force at Wright-Patterson AFB in Dayton, Ohio where, since May 2018, it has been on display.

One of the several B-17s used in the 1990 feature film Memphis Belle, is housed at the National Warplane Museum in Geneseo, New York but is currently undergoing extensive maintenance at the Palm Springs Air Museum in California.

== Early history ==
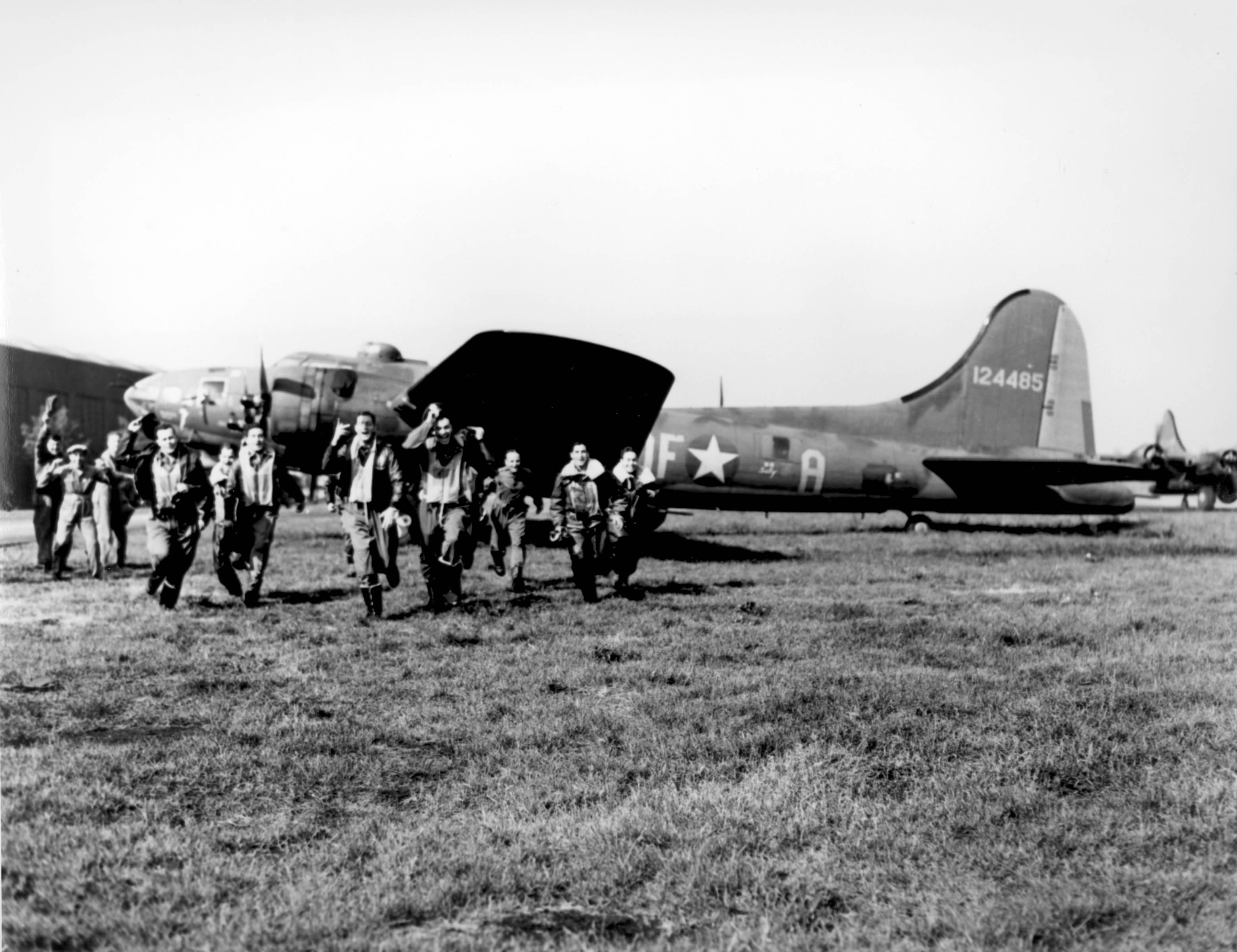
The crew back from their 25th operational mission. All were awarded the Distinguished Flying Cross and the Air Medal.

The Memphis Belle, a Boeing-built B-17F-10-BO, manufacturer's serial number 3170, USAAC Serial No. 41-24485, was added to the USAAF inventory on 15 July 1942, and delivered in September 1942 to the 91st Bombardment Group at Dow Field, Bangor, Maine. It deployed to Prestwick, Scotland, on 30 September 1942, moving to a temporary base at RAF Kimbolton on 1 October, and then finally to its permanent base at RAF Bassingbourn, England, on 14 October. Each side of the fuselage bore the unit and aircraft identification markings of a B-17 of the 324th Bomb Squadron (Heavy), with the squadron code "DF" and individual aircraft letter "A".

== Source of the name ==
The B-17 was named after pilot Robert K. Morgan's sweetheart, Margaret Polk, a resident of Memphis, Tennessee. Morgan originally intended to call the bomber Little One, which was his pet name for Polk. After Morgan and copilot Jim Verinis viewed the feature film Lady for a Night, in which the leading character owns a riverboat named the Memphis Belle, he proposed that name to his aircrew, who agreed to the name by vote. Morgan then contacted George Petty at the offices of Esquire magazine and asked him for a pinup drawing to go with the name, which Petty supplied from the magazine's April 1941 issue.

The 91st's group artist, Corporal Tony Starcer, copied, then transferred the Petty girl artwork to both sides of the forward fuselage, depicting her swimsuit in blue on the aircraft's port side and in red on the starboard side. The nose art later included 25 bomb shapes, one for each mission credit, and eight Nazi swastikas, one for each German aircraft claimed shot down by the crew. Station and crew names were stenciled below station windows on the bomber after its tour of duty was completed.

== Crew and combat missions ==
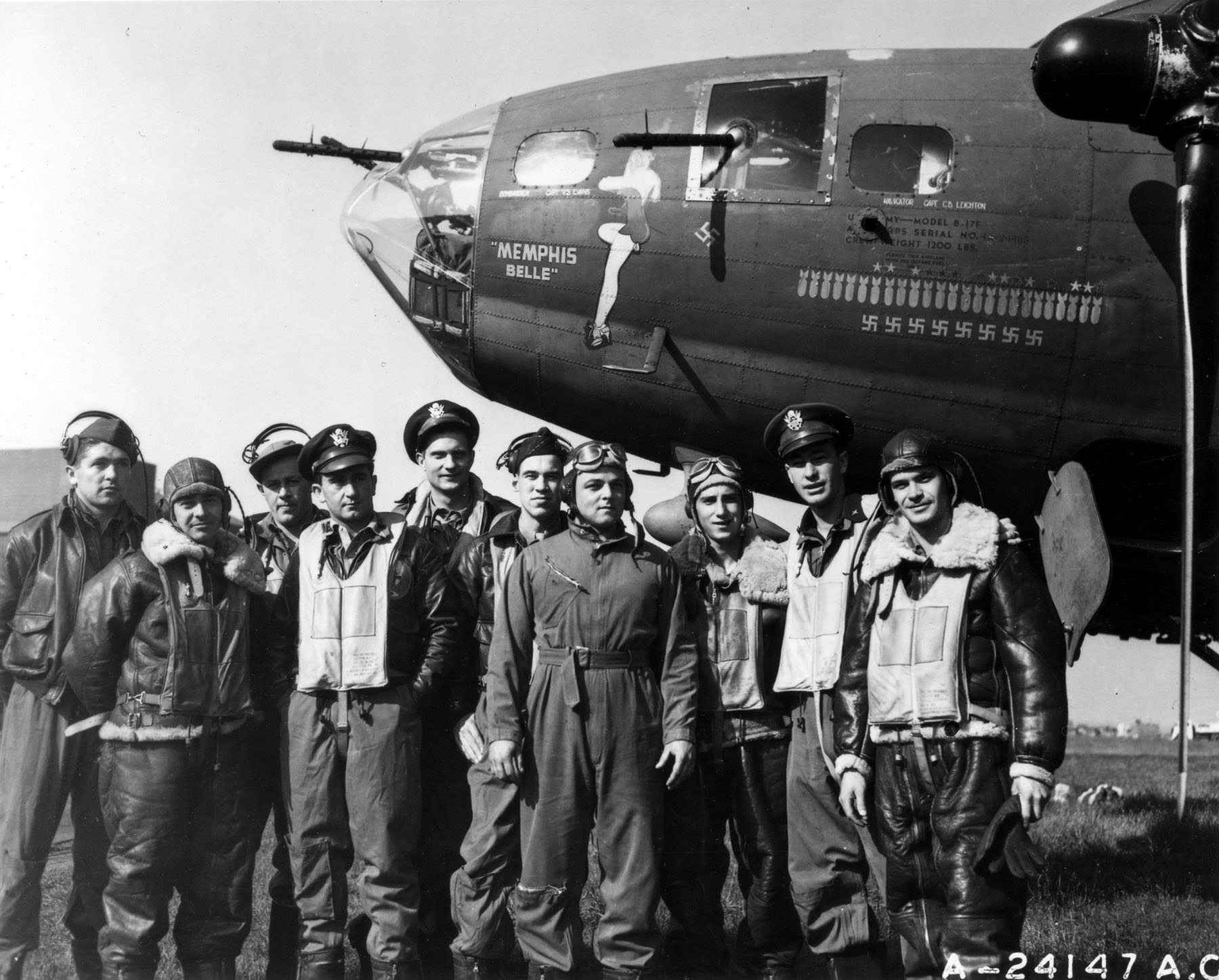
Crew of the Memphis Belle, left to right: Tech Sgt Loch, S Sgt Scott, Tech Sgt Hanson, Capt Verinis, Capt. Morgan; Capt. Leighton, Staff Sgt. Quinlan., Staff Sgt. Nastal; Capt. Vincent Evans and Staff Sgt. Winchell.

The crew for the Memphis Belle was as follows:

- Pilot: Captain Robert K. Morgan
- Co-pilot: Captain James A. Verinis
- Navigator: Captain Charles B. Leighton
- Bombardier: Captain Vincent B. Evans
- The First Engineer/Top Turret Gunner: Leviticus "Levy" Dillon
- The Second Engineer/Top Turret Gunner: Eugene Adkins
- The Third Engineer/Top Turret Gunner: Harold P. Loch
- Radio Operator: Robert Hanson
- Ball Turret Gunner: Cecil Scott
- Right Waist Gunner: E. Scott Miller
- Right Waist Gunner: Casmer A "Tony" Nastal
- Left Waist Gunner: Clarence E. "Bill" Winchell
- Tail Gunner: John P. Quinlan
- Crew Chief: Joe Giambrone
- Mascot: Stuka the Scottish Terrier

Captain Robert K. Morgan's crew flew 25 combat missions with the 324th Bomb Squadron; all but four were in the Memphis Belle. The bomber's 25 combat missions were:

- 7 November 1942 – Brest, France (Note: AAC training aids publication (July 1943) listed "the ship's" 25 missions. The mission list is crew's, however, not the aircraft's, as it lists missions of 4 February, 26 February, 5 April, and 4 May, which crew flew in other aircraft, and omits missions when others flew the Memphis Belle.)
- 9 November 1942 – St. Nazaire, France
- 17 November 1942 – St. Nazaire, France
- 6 December 1942 – Lille, France
- 20 December 1942 (Note: sources disagree on which two of these three missions, Memphis Belle received mission credits) – Romilly-sur-Seine, France
- 30 December 1942 – Lorient, France (flown by Lt. James A. Verinis)
- 3 January 1943 – St. Nazaire, France
- 13 January 1943 – Lille, France
- 23 January 1943 – Lorient, France
- 14 February 1943 – Hamm, Germany
- 16 February 1943 – St. Nazaire, France
- 27 February 1943 – Brest, France (Note: Only Morgan's account supports that he flew the Memphis Belle on this mission. The 303rd BG website states he flew 515 this date, and the 324th dailies do not show him on mission at all.)
- 6 March 1943 – Lorient, France
- 12 March 1943 – Rouen, France
- 13 March 1943 – Abbeville, France
- 22 March 1943 – Wilhelmshaven, Germany
- 28 March 1943 – Rouen, France
- 31 March 1943 – Rotterdam, Netherlands
- 16 April 1943 – Lorient, France
- 17 April 1943 – Bremen, Germany
- 1 May 1943 – St. Nazaire, France
- 13 May 1943 – Meaulte, France (flown by Lt. C.L. Anderson)
- 14 May 1943 – Kiel, Germany (flown by Lt. John H. Miller)
- 15 May 1943 – Wilhelmshaven, Germany
- 17 May 1943 – Lorient, France
- 19 May 1943 – Kiel, Germany (flown by Lt. Anderson) (Note: All references except Morgan show this as the 25th mission of the Memphis Belle. Morgan states that all flights of the Memphis Belle after 15 May were local only, for the purpose of "touchup shots" to complete editing of the film.)

Morgan's crew completed the following missions in B-17s other than the Memphis Belle:

- 4 February 1943 – Emden, Germany (in B-17 DF-H 41-24515 Jersey Bounce)
- 26 February 1943 – Wilhelmshaven, Germany (in B-17 41-24515)
- 5 April 1943 – Antwerp, Belgium (in B-17 41-24480 Bad Penny)
- 4 May 1943 – Antwerp, Belgium (in B-17 41-24527, The Great Speckled Bird)

The Memphis Belle was flown back to the United States on 8 June 1943 by a composite crew chosen by the Eighth Air Force, airmen who had flown combat aboard; they were led by Capt. Morgan for a 31-city war bond tour. Morgan's original co-pilot was Capt. James A. Verinis, who himself piloted the Memphis Belle for one mission. Verinis was promoted to aircraft commander of another B-17 for his final 16 missions and finished his tour on 13 May. He rejoined Morgan's crew as co-pilot for the flight back to the United States.

== Other 25 mission aircraft ==
A B-17E, serial number 41-2489 and nicknamed "Suzy-Q", of the 19th Bombardment Group, was the first USAAF heavy bomber in any theater to complete 25 missions (flown in the Pacific from February to October 1942) and return to the US.

A Consolidated B-24D Liberator, serial number 41-23728 and nicknamed "Hot Stuff", of the 93rd Bombardment Group, was the first B-24 in the European Theater to complete 25 missions, in February 1943, and reached 31 missions before it was sent back to the US. It crashed in Iceland on 3 May 1943, killing the commander of all United States forces in the European Theater of Operations at the time, Lieutenant General Frank Maxwell Andrews.

Recent research by Mick Hanou, president of the 91st Bombardment Group Memorial Association, and historian Jeff Duford, senior historian at the Air Force Research Laboratory History Office in Dayton, Ohio, and a former curator at the National Museum of the United States Air Force, confirmed that a B-17F of the 323rd Bombardment Squadron, 91st Bombardment Group, serial number 42-5077 and nicknamed Delta Rebel No. 2, completed 25 credited combat missions on 1 May 1943. Delta Rebel No. 2, was the first B-17 in the European Theater to complete the feat, two weeks before Hell's Angels. Delta Rebel No. 2, was shot down during the 12 August 1943 mission to Gelsenkirchen, Germany, with six of its crew captured as prisoners of war and four killed in action.

A B-17F, serial number 41-24577 and nicknamed Hell's Angels, of the 303rd Bombardment Group, completed 25 combat missions on 13 May 1943.

== Postwar history ==
In his memoirs, Morgan claimed that during his publicity tour, he flew the Memphis Belle between the Buncombe County Courthouse and the City Hall of Asheville, North Carolina, his home town. Morgan wrote that after leaving a local airport he decided to buzz the town, telling his copilot, Captain Verinis, "I think we'll just drive up over the city and give them a little goodbye salute". Morgan turned the bomber down Patton Avenue, a main thoroughfare, toward downtown Asheville. When he observed the courthouse and the city hall (two tall buildings that are only about 50 ft (20 m) apart) dead ahead, he lowered his left wing in a 60 degree bank and flew between the structures. He wrote that the city hall housed an AAF weather detachment, whose commanding officer allegedly complained immediately to the Pentagon, but was advised by a duty officer that "Major Morgan...has been given permission to buzz by General Henry "Hap" Arnold".

On 23 December 1943, the Memphis Belle, having completed its combat assignment and subsequent stateside war bond drive, was assigned to MacDill Field, Florida. It became a B-17 aircrew and ground crew training aircraft, remaining at MacDill Field until after Victory in Europe Day (VE Day). After VE Day, the aircraft was flown to Altus AAF, Oklahoma for storage and eventual reclamation.

=== Display in Memphis ===
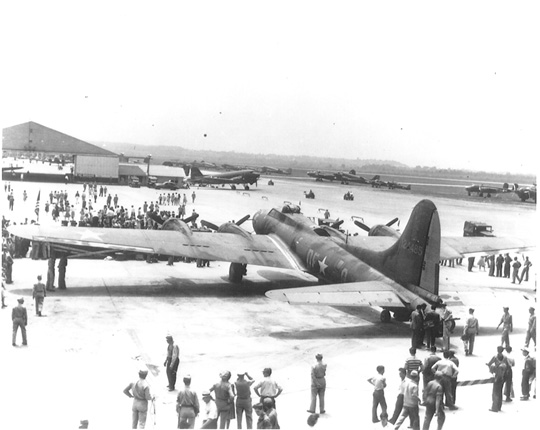
The Memphis Belle on a War Bond campaign at Patterson Field during World War II.

After the war, the Memphis Belle was saved by the mayor of Memphis, Walter Chandler, from Altus Army Airfield where it had been consigned since 1 August 1945. He arranged for the city of Memphis to buy the B-17 for US$350 (equivalent to $6,259 in 2025). It was flown to Memphis in July 1946 and stored until mid-1949, when the bomber was placed on display at the National Guard armory near the city's fairgrounds. It sat out-of-doors into the 1980s, slowly deteriorating from weather and vandalism. Souvenir hunters removed almost all of the interior components. Eventually, no instruments were left in the cockpit, and virtually every removable piece of the B-17's interior had been scavenged, often severing the wiring and control cables in the process.

In the early 1970s another mayor donated the historic B-17 back to the custody of the United States Air Force, but they allowed it to remain in Memphis, contingent on it being maintained. Efforts by the locally organized Memphis Belle Memorial Association, Inc. (MBMA) saw the bomber moved to Mud Island in the Mississippi River in 1987 for display in a new pavilion with large tarp cover. It was still open to the elements, however, and prone to weathering. Pigeons nested inside the tarp, and their droppings were constantly needing removal from the bomber. Dissatisfaction with the site led to efforts to create a new museum facility in Shelby County. In the summer of 2003 the Memphis Belle was disassembled and moved to a restoration facility at the former Naval Air Station Memphis in Millington, Tennessee for the work needed. In September 2004, however, the National Museum of the United States Air Force (NMUSAF), apparently tiring of the ups-and-downs of the city's attempts to preserve the B-17, indicated that they wanted it back for restoration and eventual display at the NMUSAF at Wright-Patterson AFB near Dayton, Ohio. The Memphis Belle-The Final Chapter in Memphis, a documentary film by Ken Axmaker, Jr., focuses on the history of the Belle in Memphis, emphasizing the final days and the volunteers who tried to keep the Memphis icon from disappearing.

=== Move to Dayton ===
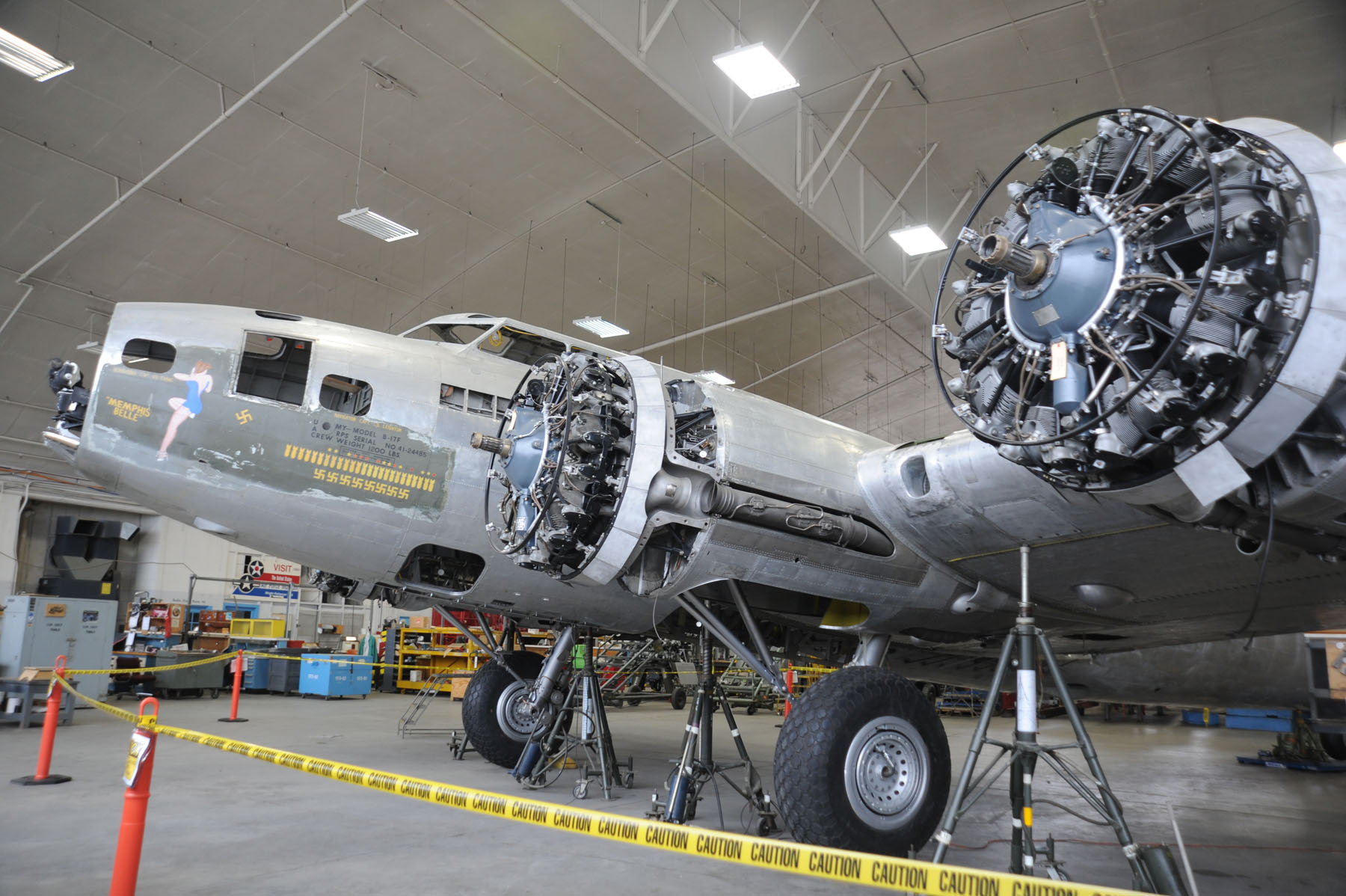
Memphis Belle during refurbishment in 2011.

On 30 August 2005, the MBMA announced that a consultant that they hired determined that the MBMA would not be able to raise enough money to restore the Belle and otherwise fulfill the Air Force's requirements to keep possession of the bomber. They announced plans to return the B-17 to the National Museum of the United States Air Force at Wright-Patterson AFB near Dayton, Ohio, after a final exhibition at an airshow in Millington, Tennessee from 30 September–2 October 2005. The Belle arrived safely at the museum in mid-October 2005 and was placed in one of the museum's restoration hangars.

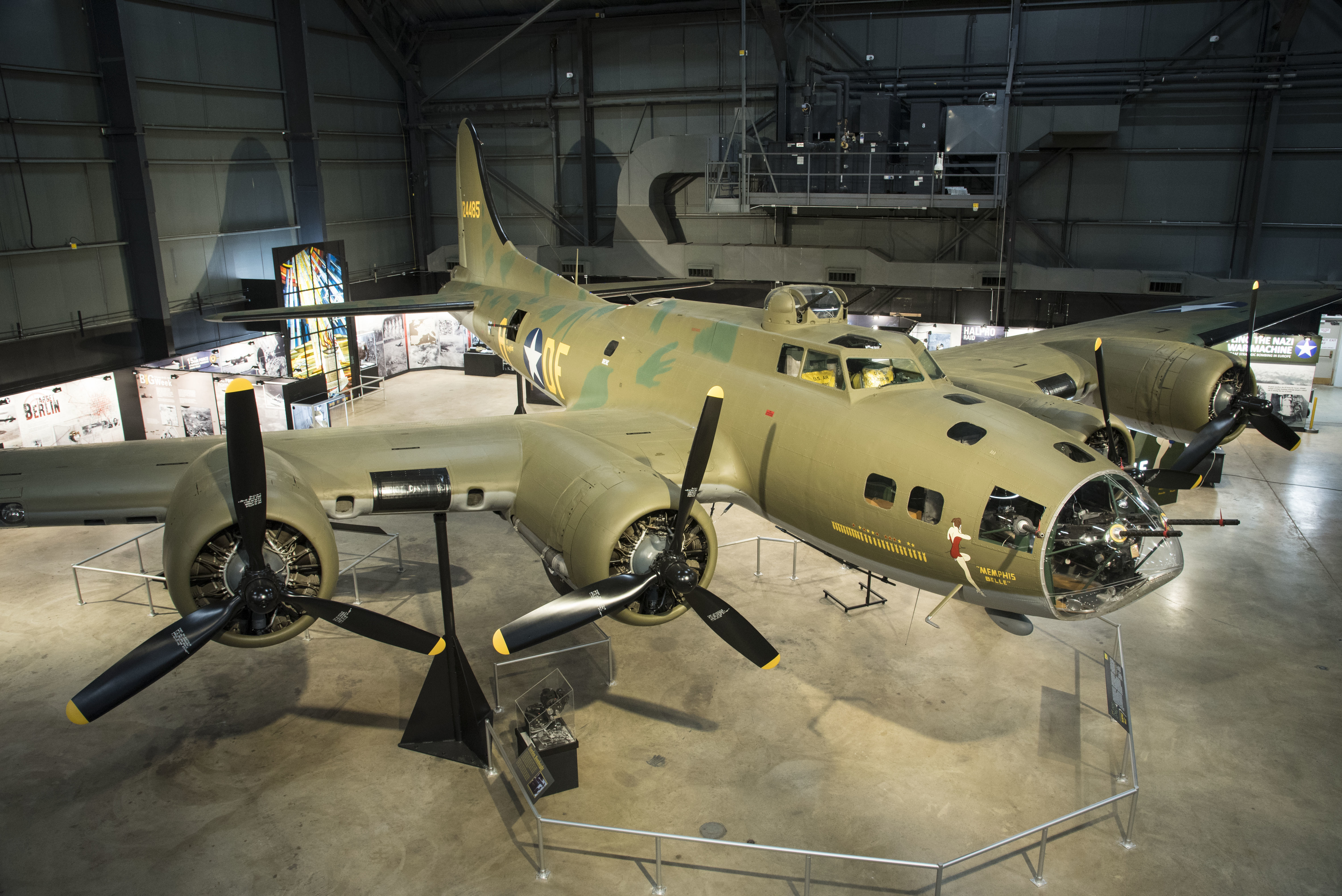
Memphis Belle after refurbishment was completed in 2018.

Restoration of the Memphis Belle was put near the top of the museum's priorities. In Friends Journal, the magazine of the museum's foundation, director Major General Charles D. Metcalf, USAF (Ret), stated that it might take eight to 10 years to fully restore the bomber.

By the spring of 2009, considerable preparatory work had been accomplished, but the fuselage and wings were still disassembled.

After stripping the paint from the aft fuselage, hundreds of names and personal messages were found scratched in the aluminum skin. It turned out that, during the B-17's war bond tour, people were allowed to leave their marks. Footage of people writing on the bomber can be seen in the documentary film The Cold Blue.

In May 2017 the museum announced the goal of completing the restoration and putting the Memphis Belle on display by 17 May 2018, the 75th anniversary of the aircraft completing its 25th mission. On 14 March 2018, the Memphis Belle was moved into the museum's WWII Gallery in a private event and was officially unveiled two months later on 17 May 2018.

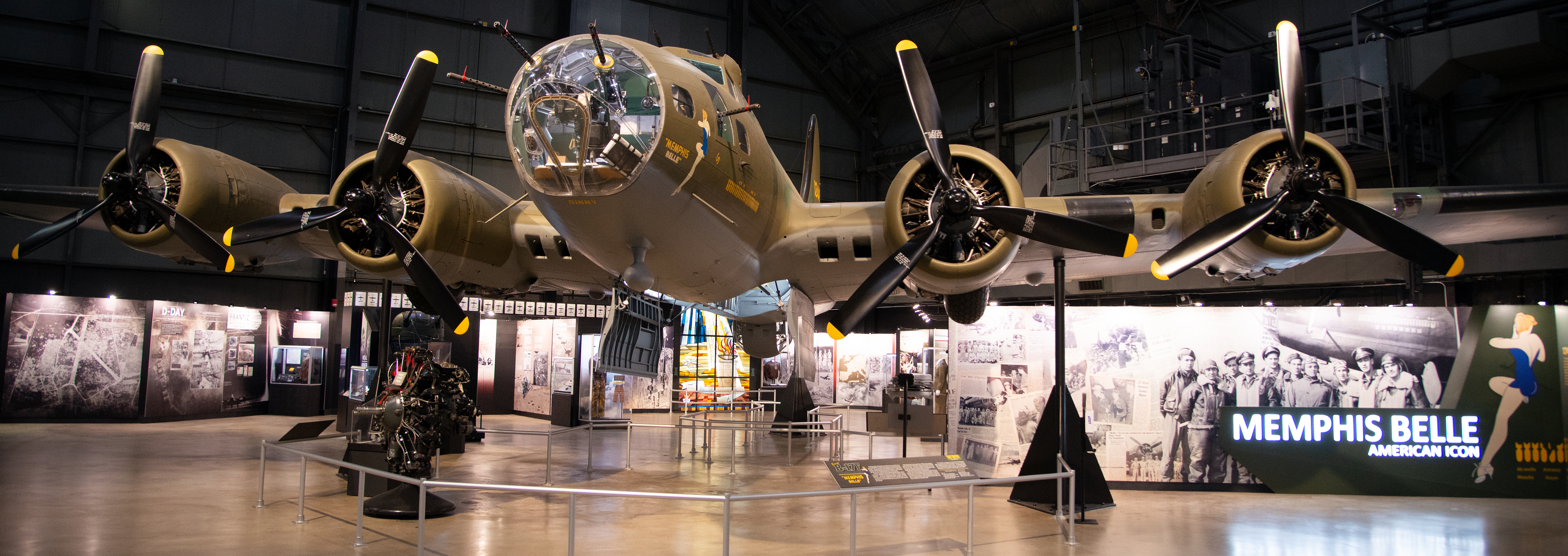
The Memphis Belle display, February 2023

== Memphis Belle film (1990) ==
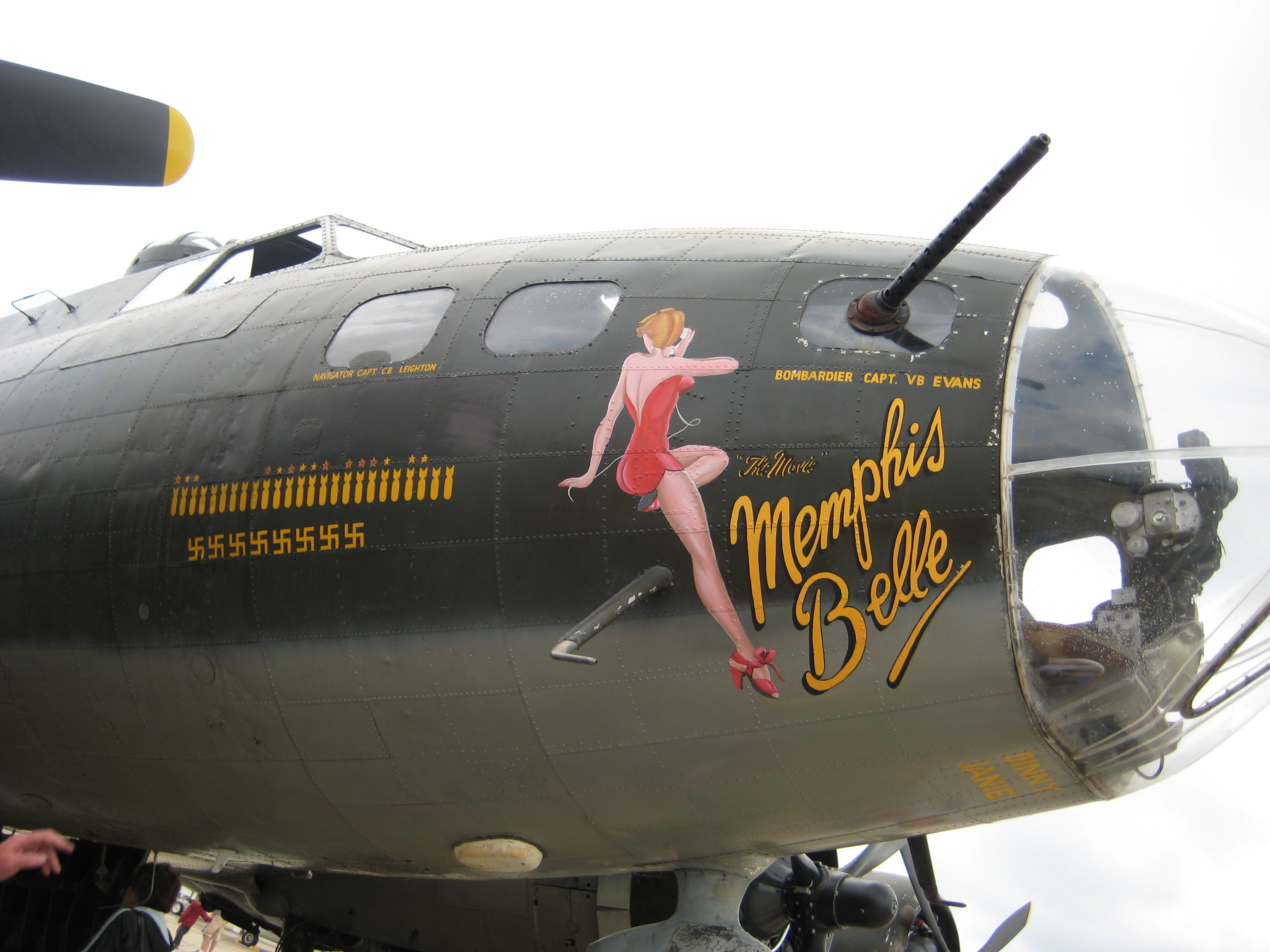
The B-17 that portrayed Memphis Belle in the 1990 film at the Joint Service Open House at Andrews Air Force Base in 2008.

Five airworthy B-17s were used in the filming of the 1990 British-American war drama Memphis Belle. Two were from the US — B-17G serial number 44-83546 and B-17F serial number 42-29782 — and one from the United Kingdom, B-17G serial number 44-85784. Two French geographic survey B-17Gs were also used: serial number 44-85643 (French civilian registration F-BEEA), which crashed on take-off near the end of filming, and serial number 44-8846 (French civilian registration F-AZDX; The Pink Lady).

The B-17Gs had some sections converted for the film into the B-17F configuration. Serial number 44-83546 was converted by installing a Sperry top turret, early-style tail gunner's compartment, and waist gunner's positions; it also had its chin turret removed. After appearing in the film, the bomber continued to make air show appearances in that configuration. Originally painted with the Warner Bros. film versions of the nose art and markings, this plane (owned by restaurateur David Tallichet until his death in 2007) now carries the historic markings found on the real Memphis Belle. It was leased by the National Warplane Museum in Geneseo, New York and housed there until late 2021 when the plane was shipped to California to undergo extensive maintenance work at the Palm Springs Air Museum where it currently remains. It carries civilian registration N3703G and is colloquially known as "the movie Memphis Belle".

Serial number 44-85784 is the last airworthy B-17 in the United Kingdom and is based at the Imperial War Museum Duxford. It is part of the USAAC World War II Memorial Flight and makes dozens of appearances across the United Kingdom and Northern Europe. It is maintained and run by volunteers, relying solely upon donations to keep it restored and flying. It carries UK civilian registration G-BEDF and is known as Sally B.

In addition to the airworthy B-17s used for the taxiing and flying sequences, others were used as background aircraft for scenes shot at the film's airbase; these were not used to portray the Memphis Belle. Serial number 42-29782 is now located at the Museum of Flight, in Seattle, Washington. It carries civilian registration N17W and is now known as the Boeing Bee.

== Other aircraft named Memphis Belle ==
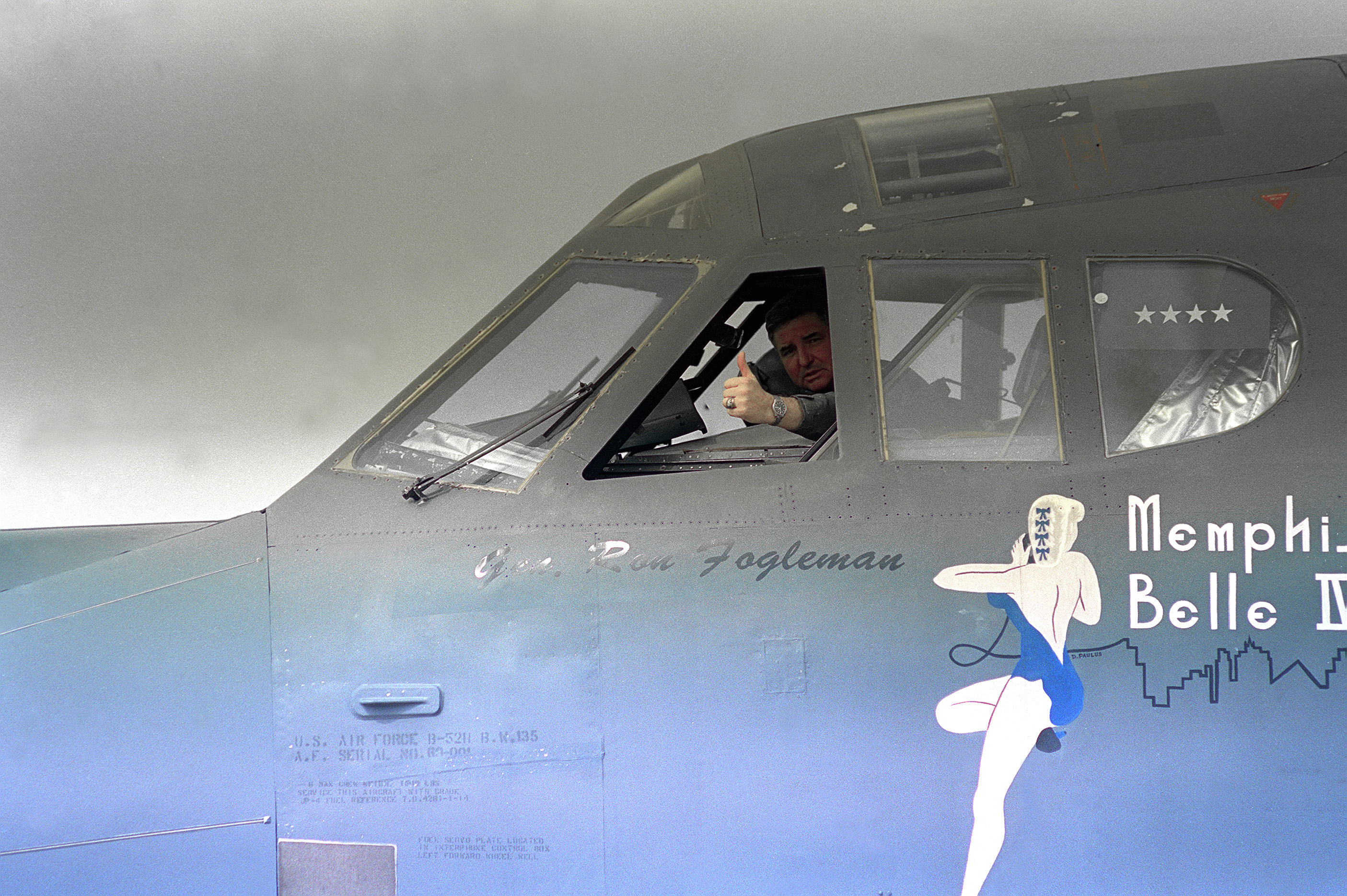
Air Force Chief of Staff General Ronald Fogleman flying the "Memphis Belle IV" Boeing B-52 Stratofortress.

- A Republic F-105D Thunderchief (AF Ser. No. 60-0504) from 357th Tactical Fighter Squadron of the 355th Tactical Fighter Wing based at Takhli Royal Thai Air Base during the Vietnam War was named Memphis Belle II in honor of the original B-17F. The aircraft claimed two MiG-17 kills in addition to numerous bombing missions, and was the last F-105 to fly. It is currently preserved at the National Museum of the United States Air Force. It was donated in April 1990.
- A Rockwell B-1B Lancer (AF Ser. No. 86-0133) was named Memphis Belle. In 1996, Colonel Robert K. Morgan, pilot of the original Memphis Belle, received the opportunity to fly in this aircraft, while it served with the Georgia Air National Guard's 116th Bomb Wing at Robins AFB, Georgia.
- A General Dynamics FB-111A Aardvark (AF Ser. No. 68-0267) was also nicknamed Memphis Belle II for a period during the 1980s. It is currently located at the Strategic Air Command Museum, located in Ashland, Nebraska.
- Two Boeing B-52 Stratofortresses have carried the name Memphis Belle. B-52G (AF Ser. No. 59-2594) was named Memphis Belle III and took part in the 1991 Gulf War. That aircraft was retired from active service as the B-52G was phased out of USAF service and sent to the AMARG at Davis-Monthan AFB, Arizona in October, 1992. The first B-52H (AF Ser. No. 60-0001) was named Memphis Belle IV and is currently assigned to the 2nd Bomb Wing at Barksdale Air Force Base, Louisiana, having seen action in both Iraq and Afghanistan in support of Operations Iraqi Freedom and Enduring Freedom.
- A McDonnell Douglas F-15E (AF Ser. No 89-0485) from the 336th Fighter Squadron, 4th Fighter Wing, flew with the nose art "Memphis Belle III" during Operation Iraqi Freedom in 2003.
- A Lockheed C-141 Starlifter (AF Ser. No 67-0024) became the Memphis Belle V. It was transferred to the AMARG inventory upon the retirement of all C-141s from active service in the U.S. Air Force, to include the Air Force Reserve and the Air National Guard.
- A Lockheed C-5 Galaxy (AF Ser. No. 69-0025) was named the Memphis Belle X was assigned to the 164th Airlift Wing of the Tennessee Air National Guard at Memphis Air National Guard Base.
- A Boeing C-17 Globemaster III (AF Ser. No. 93-0600) is named the Memphis Belle XI assigned currently to the 164th Airlift Wing of the Tennessee Air National Guard at Memphis Air National Guard Base.
- An A-10 Thunderbolt II of the USAF A-10 demonstration team carries the name Memphis Belle III.

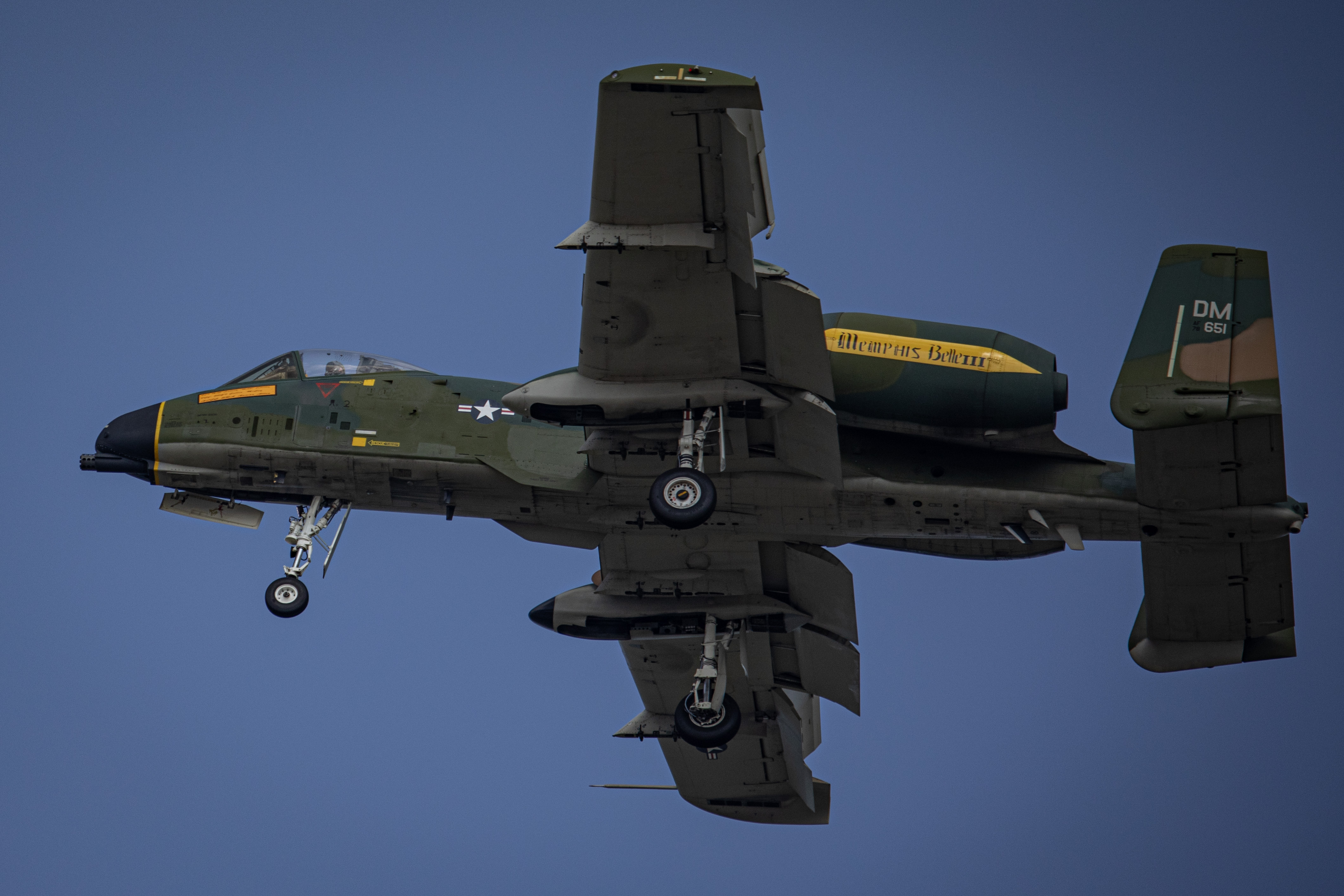
A-10 Demonstration team Memphis Belle at Oshkosh 2024

- Pinnacle Airlines' first Bombardier CRJ (N8390A) is named Spirit of Memphis Belle.

== See also ==
- Veterans' Museum (Halls, Tennessee)
- Strategic bombing during World War II
- Memphis Belle Memorial
- Alberto Vargas
- The Cold Blue
