= Robert Hanson (USAAF officer) =

US Army Air Force soldier (1920–2005)

Robert John Hanson
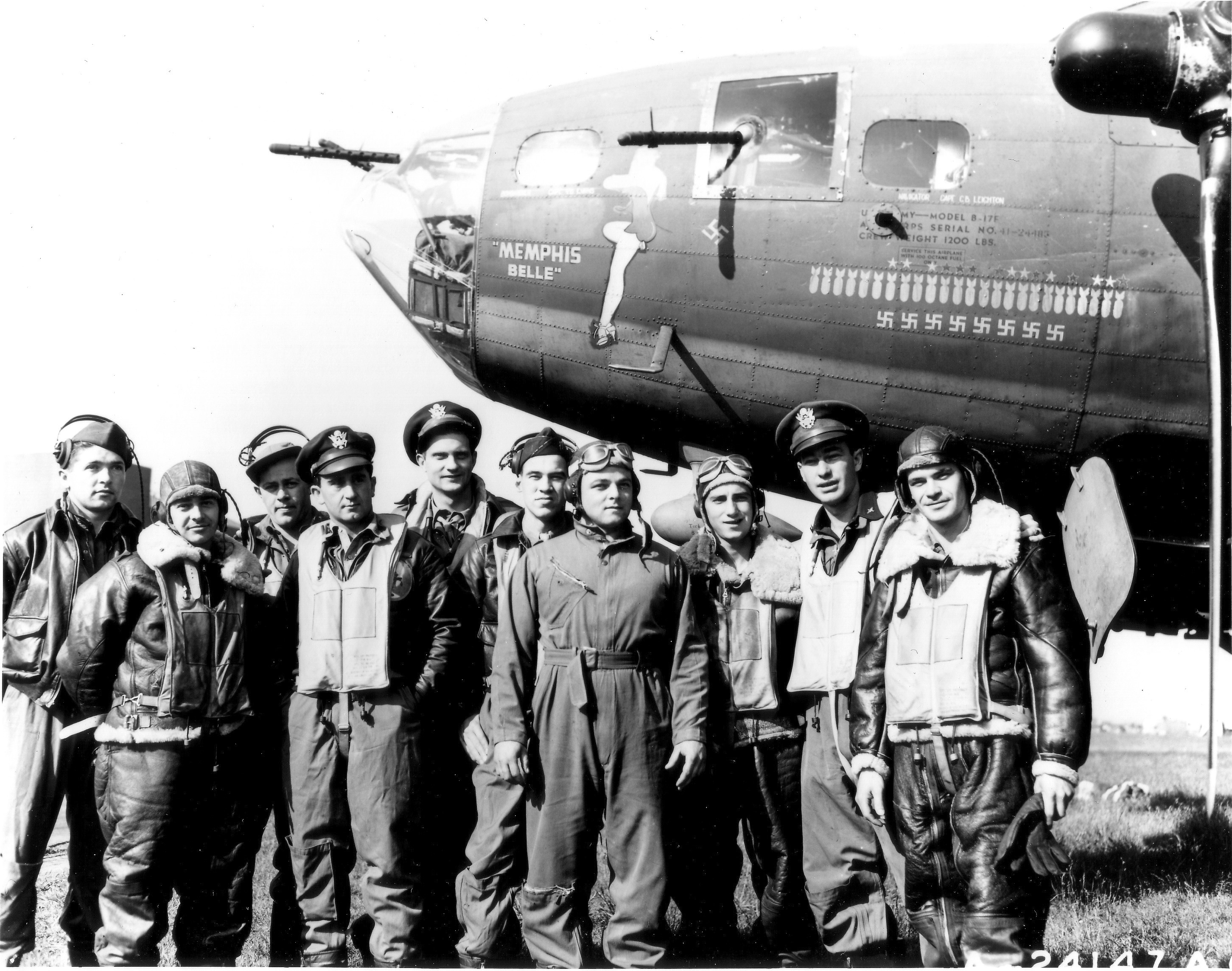
- The "Memphis Belle" crew shown at an air base in England after completing 25 missions over enemy territory on June 7, 1943. Johnson is third from left.
- Born: May 25, 1920; Walla Walla, Washington
- Died: October 1, 2005 (aged 85); Albuquerque, New Mexico
- Burial place: Santa Fe, New Mexico
- Military career
- Allegiance: United States of America
- Branch: United States Army Air Corps
- Service years: 1941–1945
- Rank: Second Lieutenant
- Unit: 324th Bomb Squadron (Heavy)
- Conflicts: Bombing Camping against Germany
- Awards: Distinguished Flying Cross; Air Medal (Three Oak Leaf Clusters)
- Other work: Company District Manager

Robert John Hanson (May 25, 1920 – October 1, 2005) served on board the B-17 bomber aircraft the Memphis Belle during the Second World War.

== Early life ==
Robert Hanson was born in Walla Walla, Washington state on May 25, 1920.

He and his two brothers were placed in an orphanage following the death of his mother when he was young. His father was a road builder and regularly absent. An uncle took them out of the orphanage and raised them at Garfield, Washington. While there, Robert was a star at athletics at high school.

His sporting prowess saw him win a baseball scholarship to university. However, Robert opted to go straight into work and became a construction worker in Spokane. From there Robert enlisted in the US Army in the summer of 1941. However, he determined not to become an infantryman after the Japanese attack on Pearl Harbor and volunteered for radio training which saw his transfer to the US Army Air Forces.

When training at Walla Walla, he was assigned to the Memphis Belle.

== Memphis Belle ==
The first raid on November 7 was against the dockyard at Brest in France. The crew's other missions came approximately every 10 days attacking the ports of France, Belgium and Nazi Germany.

Hanson carried a lucky rabbit's foot on their missions.

The crew had some close shaves: on one occasion the tail of the aircraft was shot away. This happened on January 23, 1943, while attacking the submarine pens at Lorient in France. As Hanson related -

"When we got the tail shot off, Capt. Morgan put the ship into a terrific dive and we dropped two- or three-thousand feet. It pretty nearly threw me out of the airplane, "I hit the roof. I thought we were going down and wondered if I should bail out. Then he pulled up again and I landed on my back. I had an ammunition box and a frequency meter on top of me. I didn't know what was going on."

— Robert Hanson, LA Times (3)

The Memphis Belle made it back to base with 68 rips in the skin of the fuselage.

On another occasion Hanson sneezed while writing in his logbook. At that moment a bullet passed through the space previously occupied by his head, striking his logbook. He kept the book for the rest of his life.

The first aircraft to complete at tour of 25 missions was the Hot Stuff, a B-24 Liberator bomber. However, it crashed into a mountain en route to the United States in bad weather. The Memphis Belle was selected to return to the United States in its place upon completing their 25-mission tour.

After finishing their tour the crew were introduced to King George VI and Queen Elizabeth. They then returned to the United States to take part in a 32-city tour to raise morale and sell war bonds. They were accompanied on the tour by their Highland Terrier mascot called Stuka.

Their arrival back in the United States took place at Long Beach on August 19, 1943, to the cheers of thousands Douglas Aircraft Company workers. He was discharged in the rank of Second Lieutenant.

== Later life ==
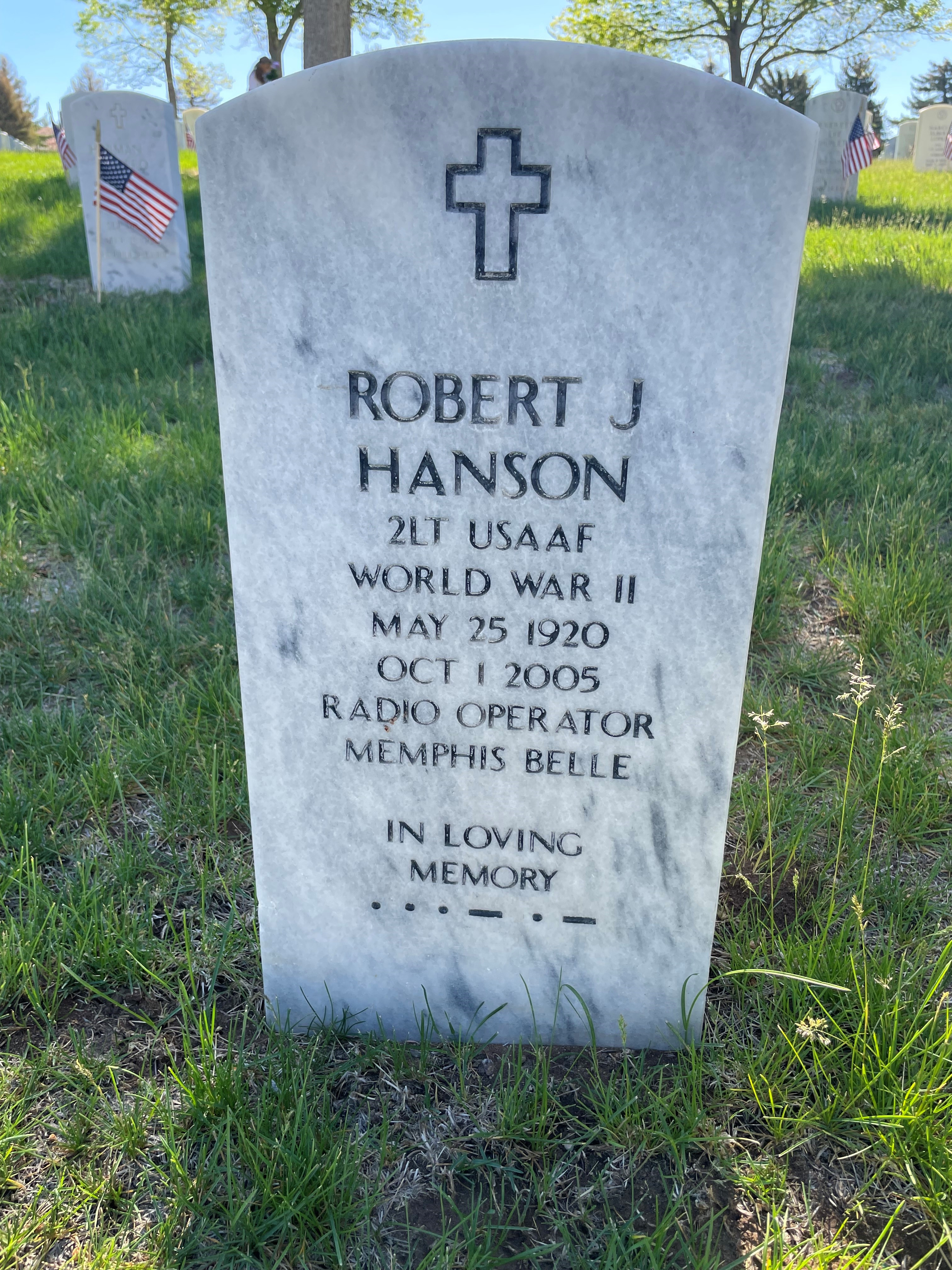
Hanson's headstone located at Santa Fe National Cemetery, with his customary Morris Code signoff at the bottom.

For the remainder of his life, Hanson used his wartime Morse Code sign-off of "dit, dit, dit, dah, dit, dah" to end telephone calls.

After his wartime service Hanson returned to Washington state. He worked for Nalley Fine Foods in Walla Walla as a salesman and subsequently a regional manager. He also worked for a Spokane candy company. Upon retirement he moved to Mesa, Arizona, and later Albuquerque in New Mexico.

== Personal life ==
In 1942 Hanson married Irene Payton, who survived him along with their son and daughter. However, he was predeceased by another daughter.

== In popular culture ==
Hanson appears in the 1944 documentary 'The Memphis Belle: A Story of a Flying Fortress' directed by William Wyler.

There was also a 1990 film 'Memphis Belle' directed by Michael Caton-Jones.

During the 1989 production Hanson visited the cast during filming at RAF Binbrook in the United Kingdom. Hanson joked, "They're not quite as good-looking as we were ... but they are young and enthusiastic – exactly like we were".

After the release of the film Hanson spoke to his grandson's high school class. When asked if what happened in the film was true, he replied "No, it didn't all happen to the Memphis Belle, but everything in the movie happened to some B-17".
