= Unsolved History =

American documentary television series

- Genre: Documentary
- Narrated by: Stockard Channing (2002-2003); Kathleen Kern (2003-2004); J.V. Martin (2004-2005)
- Composer: Mark Leggett
- Country of origin: United States
- Original language: English
- No. of seasons: 3
- No. of episodes: 51

Production
- Executive producer: Erik Nelson
- Running time: 42-45 minutes (approx. without commercials)
- Production companies: MorningStar Entertainment; Termite Art Productions (2002-2004); Creative Differences Productions (2004-2005); Lions Gate Television

Original release
- Network: Discovery Channel
- Release: October 9, 2002 – April 22, 2005

Unsolved History is an American documentary television series that aired from 2002 to 2005. The program was produced by Termite Art Productions, Lions Gate Television, and Discovery Communications for the Discovery Channel. The series lasted over three seasons and had a total of 47 episodes, in which a team of people, each with different skills, try to solve historical mysteries. As of 2007, the series airs on Investigation Discovery and occasionally on the Science Channel. However, episodes regarding the military are sometimes aired on the Military Channel.

== Episodes ==
Each episode contains an event in history that has never been conclusively solved. In every episode, a team of scientists tries to solve the case.

Season	Episodes	Originally released	
Season	Episodes	First released	Last released
1	20	October 7, 2002	September 20, 2003
2	21	October 8, 2003	August 21, 2004
3	10	November 13, 2004	April 22, 2005

== See also ==
- List of programs broadcast by Discovery Channel
