= The Memphis Belle: A Story of a Flying Fortress =

1944 film by William Wyler

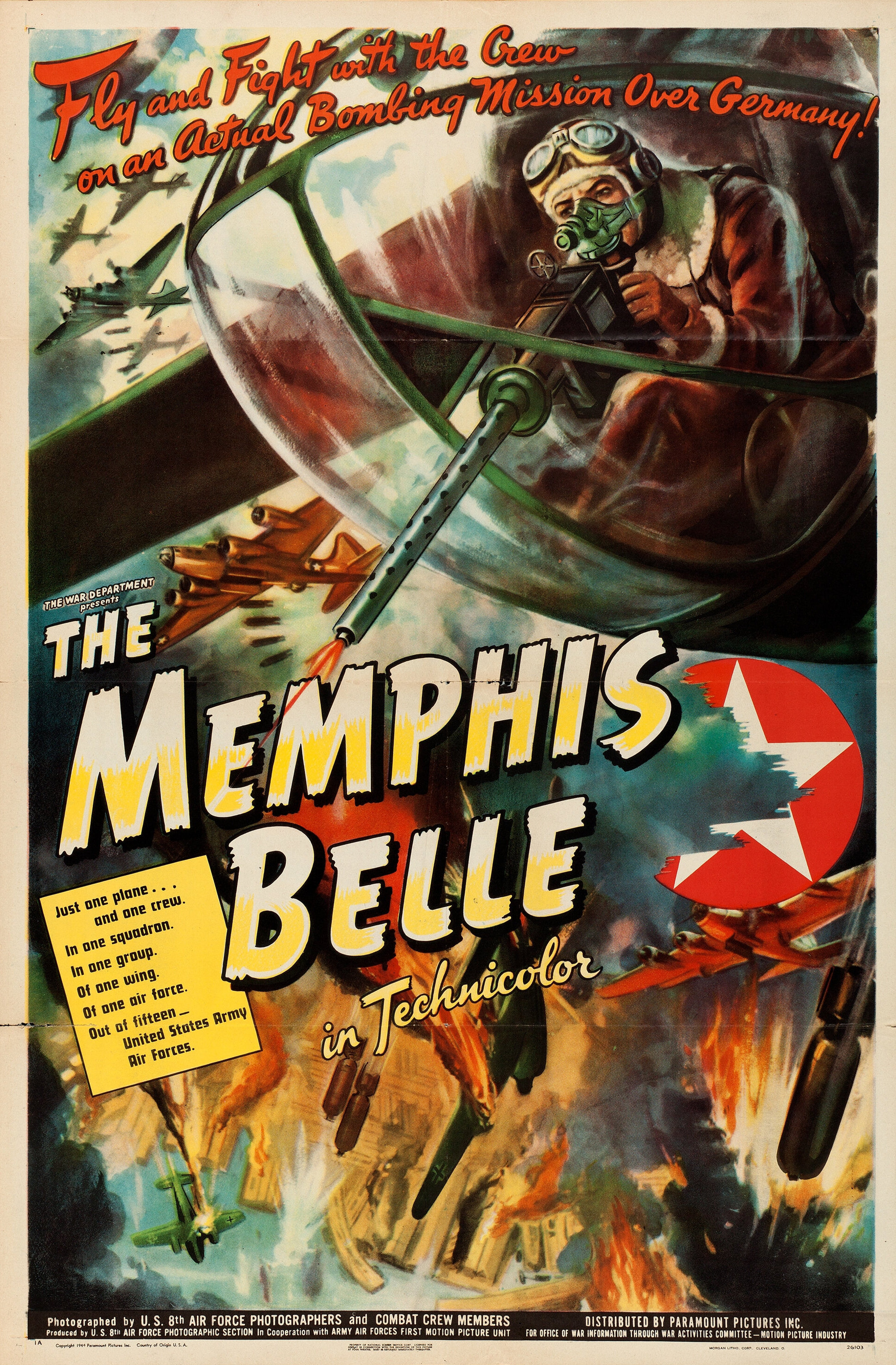
- Theatrical poster
- Directed by: William Wyler
- Written by: Jerome Chodorov; Lester Koenig; William Wyler
- Starring: The crew of the Memphis Belle
- Narrated by: Eugene Kern
- Cinematography: William H. Clothier; William V. Skall; Harold J. Tannenbaum; William Wyler
- Edited by: Lynn Harrison
- Music by: Gail Kubik
- Animation by: Rudolf Ising
- Production companies: United States War Department; First Motion Picture Unit of the United States Army Air Forces
- Distributed by: Paramount Pictures
- Release dates: April 4, 1944 (Memphis); April 13, 1944
- Running time: 45 minutes
- Country: United States
- Language: English

The Memphis Belle: A Story of a Flying Fortress

The Memphis Belle: A Story of a Flying Fortress is a 1944 documentary film which provides an account of the final mission of the crew of the Memphis Belle, a Boeing B-17 Flying Fortress. In May 1943 it became the third U.S. Army Air Forces heavy bomber to complete 25 missions over Europe, but the first to return to the United States.

The dramatic 16 mm color film of actual battles was made by three cinematographers, including First Lieutenant Harold J. Tannenbaum. Tannenbaum, a veteran of World War I, was killed in action during the filming when the bomber he was in was shot down over France on April 16, 1943.

The film was directed by Major William Wyler, narrated by Eugene Kern, and had scenes at its station, RAF Bassingbourn, photographed by Hollywood cinematographer Captain William H. Clothier Commander of the 4th Combat Camera Unit (today's 4th Combat Camera Squadron). It was made under the auspices of the First Motion Picture Unit, part of the United States Army Air Forces. The film actually depicted the next to last mission of the crew (see below) on May 15, 1943, and was made as a morale-building inspiration for the Home Front by showing the everyday courage of the men who manned these bombers.

== Cast ==
The crew on the missions filmed included:

- Captain Robert K. Morgan (pilot)
- Captain James A. Verinis (co-pilot)
- Captain Vincent B. Evans (bombardier)
- Captain Charles B. Leighton (navigator)
- Technical Sergeant Robert J. Hanson (radio operator)
- Technical Sergeant James Kinard (engineer and top gunner)
- Technical Sergeant Harold Loch
- Staff Sergeant Casimer A. Nastal (waist gunner)
- Staff Sergeant John P. Quinlan (tail gunner)
- Staff Sergeant Cecil H. Scott (ball turret gunner)
- Staff Sergeant Clarence E. Winchell (waist gunner)
- Staff Sergeant Oscar Woodrow Krigbaum (waist gunner)airman receiving a transfusion on plane

== Production ==
Morgan's crew had not flown all of its missions together. Captain Verinis had originally been Morgan's co-pilot at the beginning of their combat tour but had become a "first pilot" (aircraft commander) in his own right on December 30, 1942, after which he flew 16 missions as commander of a replacement B-17 he named Connecticut Yankee after his home state. Verinis finished his tour two days before the rest of Morgan's crew.

Nor was Morgan's crew the one originally selected by Wyler for filming. He had been following Captain Oscar O'Neill (whose bomber was named Invasion 2nd) of the 401st Bomb Squadron until O'Neill's B-17 and five others of the 401st were shot down over Bremen, Germany, on April 17, 1943, at that time the most costly mission yet for the Eighth Air Force. Morgan was then selected and his crew re-united by the Eighth Air Force to complete its tour together and to return to the United States for a war bond drive. Wyler also informed Morgan when asked that, had the Memphis Belle been shot down on the crew's final mission, Wyler had a backup crew working with another B-17 about to finish its 25 missions, Hell's Angels of the nearby 303d Bombardment Group. Hell's Angels actually completed 25 missions first, on May 13 (the date of the 19th for the Memphis Belle).

Morgan states in his memoirs that he was approached by Wyler in late January 1943 after his crew's eighth mission. Wyler told Morgan he wanted to film the Memphis Belle and her crew because of "a certain mystique" to the aircraft's nickname, and that Morgan's reputation as a pilot meant that Wyler would be "in the center of the action...(with) a pretty good chance of coming back." Morgan agreed after assurances from Wyler that the film crew would not interfere with operation of the airplane in combat in any way.

The first mission flown in filming was not aboard the Memphis Belle, but aboard the B-17 Jersey Bounce on a February 26, 1943, mission to Wilhelmshaven, Germany. The Memphis Belle was being repaired after severe battle damage incurred on February 16. The mission experienced heavy German fighter attacks and two of the 91st group's B-17s were shot down. Despite the hazards, Wyler filmed at least six more combat missions with Morgan's crew, not all of them aboard the Memphis Belle, using a set-up that placed mounted cameras in the nose, tail, right waist, and radio hatch positions. The camera setup is documented in the photograph of the Bad Penny, which Morgan and Wyler flew on a mission to Antwerp on April 5, 1943. Other bombing runs from the film have been geolocated to Saint-Nazaire, Lorient, and Rennes in France.

The 16 mm color film used did not include sound, and this was added later in Hollywood. The original crew, during their war bonds drive in the United States, made typical appropriate comments to each other while watching the silent movie in a studio. The result was difficult to distinguish from real combat recordings.

King George VI (wearing the uniform of a Marshal of the Royal Air Force) and his consort Queen Elizabeth are seen congratulating the crew on May 18, after Morgan's final mission but the day before that of the B-17.

== Reception ==
In The New York Times review of the documentary, critic Bosley Crowther praised the film as "A thorough and vivid comprehension of what a daylight bombing is actually like for the young men who wing our heavy bombers from English bases into the heart of Germany..." Film critic and writer James Agee praised the documentary: "This same vigorous and pitiful sense of the presence, danger, skill, and hope of several human beings so pervades the flying, flak, bombing, and fighting scenes that not even one of the dozen or so superhuman shots allows you to feel that either it or your are there for the view. Everything is seen, done, and experienced as if from inside one or another of the men in the plane. Color and the sudden amazements of the air help to create this immediacy, but so do the very experienced, vigilant photography, the even better cutting, and a general good taste which knows better than to use any rhetoric of image, word, or sound in dealing with such facts."

== Impact ==
In 2001, the United States Library of Congress deemed the original version "culturally significant" and selected it for preservation in the National Film Registry.

The Memphis Belle aircraft is now preserved at the National Museum of the United States Air Force at Wright-Patterson AFB, near Dayton, Ohio.

== 1990 film ==
A picture of the story, Memphis Belle, was produced in 1990 by David Puttnam in England. It was co-produced by Catherine Wyler, the daughter of William Wyler, directed by Michael Caton-Jones and starred Matthew Modine and Eric Stoltz. The movie still had fiction, for example the crew's names.

== Home video ==
In 2010, the film was released in high definition on Blu-ray disc by Periscope Film LLC. It is also included with the 2014 Blu-ray release of the 1990 Memphis Belle.

== 2016 restoration ==
In 2016 documentary filmmaker Eric Nelson became aware that the 34 reels of raw footage William Wyler used to cut the film were available in the United States National Archives and Records Administration. He led a team that laboriously replaced the scratched and faded frames with the unscratched frames. After the restoration was finished he used the 90 hours of film on those 34 reels to cut a new documentary, entitled The Cold Blue.

== See also ==
- "Jersey Bounce", the song that inspired naming of several World War II bombers

There are connections with Twelve o'Clock High. The Memphis Belle flew in the 91st bomb group of the Eighth Air Force. The bomb group of Twelve o'Clock High is the 918th. During the briefing for the last Memphis Belle mission one of the planes in the mission is commanded by a pilot named Lay. Beirne Lay is both the writer of 12 o'Clock High and flew missions for the Eighth Air Force.
