= Dinosaur Revolution =

- Title card
- Directed by: David Krentz; Erik Nelson
- Narrated by: Rick Robles
- Country of origin: United States
- Original language: English
- No. of episodes: 4

Production
- Executive producers: Erik Nelson; Alan Eyres; Brooke Runnette
- Running time: 42 minutes
- Production companies: Creative Differences; Mokko; Sauce FX; Hawaii Animation Studios; Kinkajou

Original release
- Network: Discovery Channel; Science
- Release: September 4 – September 13, 2011

Dinosaur Revolution is a four-part American nature documentary produced by Creative Differences. It utilizes computer-generated imagery to portray dinosaurs and other animals from the Mesozoic era. The program was originally aired on the Discovery Channel and Science.

Although Dinosaur Revolution was the first dinosaur documentary to feature a darker, more serious and violent adult atmospheric tone and the first to have been targeted towards a 13 and 14 year old audience, it served as a reimagining of the comic book series Age of Reptiles, and also included various comedic elements in some of its segments.

== Background and production history ==
Production of the series began in spring of 2009 (after several months of pre-production) and took three years in total. The series was built around several short- and long-form stories taking place in a number of distinct environments spanning the Mesozoic era. Its original title was Reign of the Dinosaurs. Each episode was to be instead followed by one of a companion series, called Science of Reign of the Dinosaurs, which would feature scientists explaining the basis for the preceding story, and pointing out which parts were speculative or imaginary. Due to cuts and changes in marketing strategy by the network and production company, the series was eventually renamed Dinosaur Revolution, and divided into a more traditional format inter-cut with "talking heads," or brief explanations from scientists. The series was also cut from the planned six hours to four. Of the four finished episodes, the first was originally planned to feature the Triassic Chinle Formation of the southwestern United States, and to include Coelophysis, Placerias and Postosuchus in the storyline. However, during production the sequence was changed to the older Ischigualasto Formation of Argentina, and the featured animals changed to Eoraptor, Ischigualastia and Saurosuchus. For this reason, the Ischigualastia model remained anatomically based on Placerias. Scenes featuring Cryolophosaurus and Glacialisaurus were shot in Tenerife.

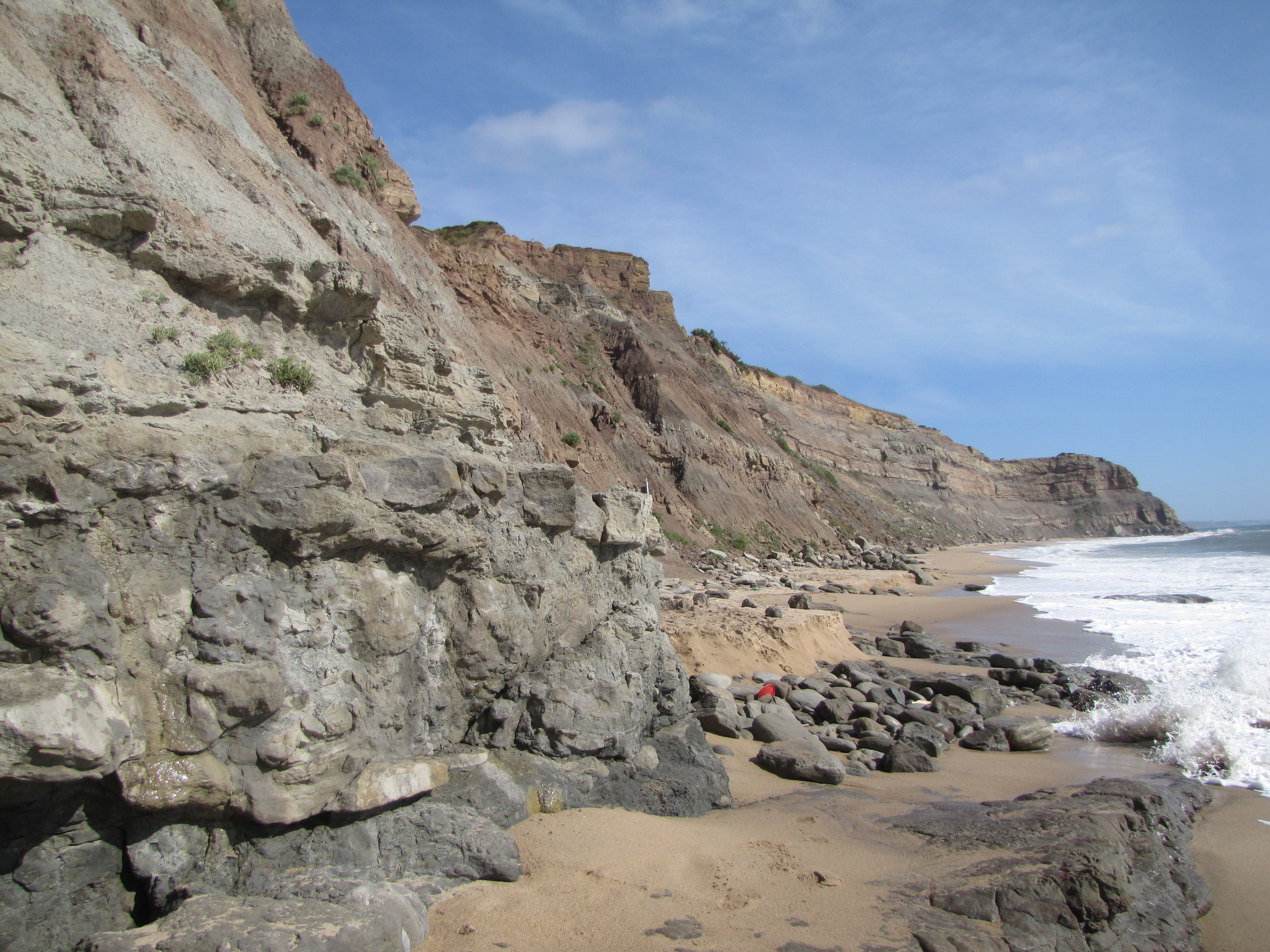
The Lourinhã Formation, the setting of the second episode

The second episode, titled "The Watering Hole," was originally intended to highlight the Jurassic Morrison Formation of western North America, which has been featured in numerous dinosaur documentaries. At the suggestion of science consultant Tom Holtz, the setting was changed to the contemporary Lourinhã Formation of Portugal, and like the first episode, some species were swapped for equivalents in the new location. This resulted in televised appearances of dinosaurs such as Draconyx. Similarly, the Cretaceous Mongolia sequence (which took place during the third episode) was set in the Wulansuhai Formation rather than the near-contemporary, and more familiar, Djadochta Formation. Therefore, it featured the first film appearances of the species Velociraptor osmolskae and Protoceratops hellenikorhinus in place of the more well-known V. mongoliensis and P. andrewsi. Some of the events of "The Watering Hole" were based on Holtz's own research, such as the scenes featuring an Allosaurus whose lower jaw was wounded by the tail of a sauropod. Most species in this show were scientifically reported to Portugal by the Portuguese paleontologist Octávio Mateus. Not all animals featured in the finished program were based on specific species from the fossil record. Some, like the aquatic crocodyliform in the Utahraptor sequence and the carnivorous notosuchian in the Anhanguera sequence (both aired during the third episode), were left intentionally unnamed.

Notable artists involved in the production include David Krentz (who had previously worked on John Carter of Mars and Disney's Dinosaur), Ricardo Delgado (famous for his comic book Age of Reptiles), Tom de Rosier (who had worked on Lilo & Stitch and Mulan), Mishi McCaig (who had worked on Iron Man), Pete Von Sholly (who had worked on The Mask and Darkman), and Iain McCaig (one of the artists involved in the production of the Star Wars film series). Previous efforts which the creators cited as inspiration include Looney Tunes, Avatar, Up, and WALL-E.

The modeling, texturing, and painting of the various creatures featured in the episodes was done by Creative Differences in ZBrush, while animation and rendering were done in Maya by various other companies that had been employed by Creative Differences. These included Mokko in Montreal, Kinkajou in the UK, Sauce FX, and Hawaii Animation Studios. Hawaii Animation Studios also used a program known as Bakery Relight for rendering.

Miniature sets, along with physical special effects were designed and filmed by, Los Angeles based, Tindall Vision Laboratories by director John Tindall. The sets include the dramatic Troodon segment staged on a post asteroid-impacted world.

A press release by the Discovery Channel initially led to some confusion about the production of the series, leading some to believe that the project had been produced by Pixar rather than Creative Differences.

=== Original airing ===
The first two episodes of Dinosaur Revolution aired on Discovery Channel on September 4, 2011. The final two episodes were scheduled to air September 11, 2011, on Discovery Channel. However, out of respect for the tenth anniversary of the September 11 attacks, a last-minute schedule change replaced them with 9/11-related programming. These two episodes were rescheduled to air on Science on September 13, 2011.

=== Incomplete segments and errors ===
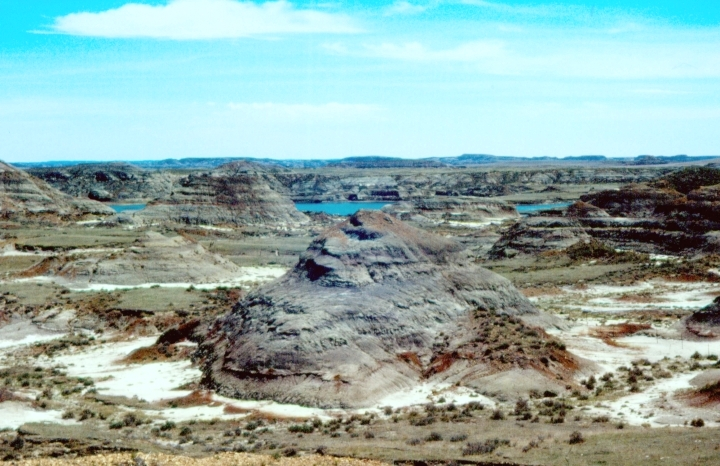
The Hell Creek formation, the setting of the fourth episode

Stories which were cut or not completed during production were to have featured animals such as Spinosaurus, Megapnosaurus, Placodus, Mixosaurus, Nothosaurus, Iguanodon, Agilisaurus and Prenocephale. The Prenocephale model was re-used as a pachycephalosaur in the final episode (centered on the Hell Creek Formation). A segment featuring an unknown pterosaur (which was suggested by biology professor Michael Habib) was also planned but could not be prepared in time for the Discovery Channel airing. Artist Pete Von Sholly, who was involved in the production, expressed regret over the way the production was handled and cuts were made. In Von Sholly's opinion, some of the best sequences were left unproduced; cuts were made not based on the quality of the story, he claimed, but on how far along in the production process the segments were. However, director David Krentz has stated that sequences were cut based on story quality.

Additionally, some relevant scientific discoveries were published too late into production to have been incorporated into the program. For example, the mosasaur in the first episode lacked a tail fluke, the discovery of which came immediately after the CGI model was completed, according to director David Krentz. (Note that this CGI model is referred to as the genus Mosasaurus by the web site for the program, while Krentz has stated it was a Tylosaurus.)

=== Alternate version ===
Pete Von Sholly blogged in 2011, saying that a "proper version" would "see the light of day". On September 10, Von Sholly commented on a Dinosaur Revolution review, suggesting the possibility of a "creator's cut" version of Dinosaur Revolution which would correct problems which he alleged were caused by the network. Finally, on September 14, Von Sholly commented on another Dinosaur Revolution review, confirming the existence of a new version consisting of the material from the show, without any narration, that would be released on Blu-ray. This marked the basis for the film version of the series, Dinotasia.

== List of episodes ==
No.	Title	Time range	Original release date
1	"Evolution's Winners"	Late Permian–Cretaceous	September 4, 2011
Sequences include: A pair of Inostrancevia during the Permian-Triassic extinction event.; Eoraptor's mating rituals in Triassic South America; A battle between two cryolophosaurs in Jurassic Antarctica; An examination of the adaptations of Gigantoraptor; An attack by a female Tylosaurus on Squalicorax sharks to defend her offspring 75 Mya Great Plains Western North America; The chase of a Glacialisaurus by a Cryolophosaurus and a deadly swarm of mosquitoes; Animals featured include: Cockroach; Inostrancevia; Eoraptor; Ischigualastia (identified as Dicynodont); Saurosuchus; Chiniquodon (identified as Probelesodon); Gigantoraptor; Zalambdalestes; Cryolophosaurus; Cryodrakon (unidentified); Tylosaurus (identified as Mosasaur); Squalicorax; Mosquito; Antarctic lizard; Glacialisaurus
2	"The Watering Hole"	150 ma (Late Jurassic)	September 4, 2011
The episode focuses upon the interactions between various animals that lived around a watering hole in Lourinhã Formation, Portugal, 150 million years ago. Animals featured include: Allosaurus; Dinheirosaurus; Torvosaurus; Ornitholestes; Rhamphorhynchus; Miragaia; Lusotitan; Draconyx
3	"Survival Tactics"	Middle Jurassic–Cretaceous	September 13, 2011
Sequences include: A Utahraptor pack hunt: The scene portrayed during the episode was inspired by the "Battle at Kruger" video.; A sequence featuring a Rahonavis which portrays the species as being capable of climbing trees in Madagascar; An Anhanguera brood learning to fly in Brazil, 125 Ma; Sequences featuring mammals such as Castorocauda and Volaticotherium also two Guanlong chasing them in China; A Protoceratops male voyaging with a baby and fending off Velociraptor in 75 Mya Gobi Desert; A Shunosaurus juvenile eating red mushrooms and unusually fending off two Sinraptor in China.; Animals featured include: Turtle (indeterminate); Utahraptor; Cedarosaurus; Crocodyliform (undetermined); Rahonavis; Rapetosaurus; Majungasaurus; Beelzebufo; Shunosaurus; Sinraptor; Guanlong; Castorocauda; Volaticotherium; Crocodile (unidentified); Mamenchisaurus; Protoceratops; Azhdarchid (undetermined); Velociraptor; Anhanguera; Crab; Araripesuchus (unidentified)
4	"End Game"	65 Ma (Late Cretaceous)	September 13, 2011
The episode focuses upon Tyrannosaurus, portraying the species as "complex, dynamic and even bird-like". It then goes on to depict the Cretaceous–Paleogene extinction event, and uses the Alvarez hypothesis to explain the extinction. A sole Troodon is depicted as "the last dinosaur". However, it is explained that "[if] birds are [the dinosaurs'] descendants, then we're still living in the Age of Dinosaurs—and the dinosaur revolution continues." Animals featured include: Tyrannosaurus; Pachycephalosaurus (unidentified); Troodon; Ankylosaurus; Quetzalcoatlus (unidentified); Triceratops; Alphadon; Pigeon; Geese

== Critical reception ==
Dinosaur Revolution received mixed reviews from critics. Riley Black, writing for Smithsonian, criticized the show, citing a lack of scientific content. She described it as "more of a dinosaur tribute than a scientific documentary". Holtz commented on the review and generally agreed with Black's criticisms of the program. Linda Stasi, a TV critic for the New York Post, criticized the show for being too "cutesy," although she did note that the program teaches viewers "a huge amount of interesting stuff". Ross Langager from PopMatters criticized the show for its lack of scientific content. Brian Lowry of Variety took a more positive view of the series: while criticizing the series' lack of "groundbreaking" content, he nonetheless determined that it was "a very laudable decision to give viewers get a taste of life on a prehistoric planet." New York Daily News reviewer David Hinckley did have his criticisms, but he still noted the show for being "lively".

== Dinotasia ==
In 2012, a feature film called Dinotasia was released into theatres, incorporating and expanding upon the footage seen in Dinosaur Revolution. It was designed to be closer to what Dinosaur Revolution was originally conceived as. It is narrated by Werner Herzog.
