= Daytime Revolution =

2024 documentary film

- Theatrical release poster
- Directed by: Erik Nelson
- Produced by: Amy Briamonte
- Edited by: Paul Marengo
- Music by: Mark Leggett
- Production companies: CBS Media Ventures; Creative Differences; Shout! Studios
- Distributed by: Kino Lorber
- Release date: October 9, 2024 (United States)
- Running time: 108 minutes
- Country: United States
- Language: English

Daytime Revolution is a 2024 American documentary film directed by Erik Nelson and starring John Lennon and Yoko Ono. The film covers the week in February 1972 when Lennon and Ono co-hosted five editions of the American daytime TV programme The Mike Douglas Show. The programs combined discussions of current affairs and musical performances, with guests including Chuck Berry, George Carlin, Ralph Nader and Jerry Rubin.

== Synopsis ==
The film interleaves restored excerpts from the five episodes, 14–18 February 1972, of The Mike Douglas Show co-hosted with Douglas by John Lennon and Yoko Ono, with newly filmed interviews with some of the participants, and contextual archive news coverage.

== Cast ==
(alphabetical)

- Chuck Berry
- George Carlin
- E.V. Di Massa Jr.
- Mike Douglas
- Chris Iijima
- John Lennon
- Nobuko Miyamoto
- Ralph Nader
- Yoko Ono
- Vivian Reed
- David Rosenboom
- Jerry Rubin
- Gary E. Schwartz
- Bobby Seale
- Hilary Redleaf Stillman
- The Plastic Ono Band with Elephant's Memory
- Yellow Pearl

== Reception ==
In The New York Times Jeannette Catsoulis wrote: "The most shocking takeaway from the movie is how tame it feels. The mood is overwhelmingly congenial and playful, with Ono’s dippier contributions drawing titters from the audience and occasional bafflement from her perpetually gum-chewing husband. ... But for Daytime Revolution to live up to its name and become more than a curious cultural artifact would require a richer historical context, an explanation of why these people mattered and why their views were so feared by the White House. ... The movie’s quiet star is Douglas himself. Whether gently asking a tense Rubin about his upbringing, or helping Ono with her 'box of smiles,' Douglas’s kindness and intellectual curiosity are more compelling than any political argument."

In The Hollywood Reporter David Rooney wrote: "Attempts to integrate archival news footage of the time – Nixon’s China trip, Vietnam misinformation, marijuana alarmism, school busing protests – could be more seamless, but the footage from the shows is the rightful star. ... This recap of a unique and deeply sincere bid to demystify utopian ideals for the conservative masses using the platform of popular television offers a fascinating glimpse into a very different period in this country’s past."

Bill Kopp wrote in Goldmine: "Nelson is not at all heavy handed in his approach, eschewing a narrator and instead allowing the archival footage to make its own points. Contemporary commentary from the guests and staff adds weight, and makes clear that even in 1972, everyone involved appreciated that something important was happening."

== Home media ==
The film was released on Blu-Ray by Kino Lorber in 2024.
