= Dreams with Sharp Teeth =

- DVD cover
- Directed by: Erik Nelson
- Written by: Erik Nelson; Harlan Ellison
- Produced by: Erik Nelson; Randall M. Boyd
- Starring: Harlan Ellison; Robin Williams; Neil Gaiman; Peter David; Ronald D. Moore; Josh Olson; Tom Snyder
- Cinematography: Wes Dorman
- Edited by: Randall Boyd
- Music by: Richard Thompson
- Production company: Creative Differences
- Release date: June 4, 2008
- Running time: 96 minutes
- Country: United States
- Language: English

Dreams with Sharp Teeth is a 2008 biographical documentary film about writer Harlan Ellison. It is composed of original and archive footage of Ellison and talking head segments from colleagues and fans including Robin Williams, Peter David, and Neil Gaiman.

== History ==
In 1981, then-24-year-old producer Erik Nelson began shooting footage of Ellison while the author was at work on his typewriter. The footage was meant for a PBS segment set to air in March of that year. Ellison allowed Nelson to repeatedly film and interview him over subsequent years, stating that he thought Nelson to be "a fan working on a student project", and has stated that he never suspected that the film would amount to a serious production on such a professional level.

The result of those sessions, and subsequent sessions spanning decades from the original, have been culled and edited, with additions from contemporaries of Ellison into what has become a documentary following a rough arc of Ellison's life and activities.

The film's name was taken from the title of a three-volume omnibus of Ellison's works that was published in 1991.

Dreams with Sharp Teeth received its first public screening Thursday, April 19, 2007, at the Writers Guild Theatre in Los Angeles. In September 2007, the film was screened at Ellison's last public appearance in his hometown of Cleveland for the Midwestern debut of the documentary at Cleveland Public Library.

The DVD version was released on May 26, 2009. Additional materials on the DVD include a short feature on the film's debut screening, a conversation over pizza between Ellison and Gaiman, and readings of extracts from a number of short stories.

== Reception ==
On the review aggregator website Rotten Tomatoes, 100% of 20 critics' reviews are positive, with an average rating of 7.8/10.
