= Memphis Belle (film) =

1990 film by Michael Caton-Jones

- Theatrical release poster
- Directed by: Michael Caton-Jones
- Written by: Monte Merrick
- Produced by: David Puttnam; Catherine Wyler
- Starring: Matthew Modine; Eric Stoltz; Sean Astin; Harry Connick Jr.; Reed Diamond; Tate Donovan; John Lithgow; D. B. Sweeney; Billy Zane; Courtney Gains; Neil Giuntoli
- Cinematography: David Watkin
- Edited by: Jim Clark
- Music by: George Fenton
- Production companies: Enigma Productions; Fujisankei Communications; British Satellite Broadcasting; County NatWest Ventures
- Distributed by: Warner Bros.
- Release dates: 5 September 1990 (Premiere); 7 September 1990 (United Kingdom); 12 October 1990 (United States)
- Running time: 107 minutes
- Countries: United Kingdom; United States
- Language: English
- Budget: $23 million (estimated)
- Box office: $27 million (USA)

Memphis Belle is a 1990 war drama film directed by Michael Caton-Jones and written by Monte Merrick. The film stars Matthew Modine, Eric Stoltz, and Harry Connick Jr. (in his film debut). Memphis Belle is a fictional version of the 1944 documentary Memphis Belle: A Story of a Flying Fortress by director William Wyler, about the 25th and last mission of an American Boeing B-17 Flying Fortress bomber, the Memphis Belle, based in England during World War II. The 1990 version was co-produced by David Puttnam and Wyler's daughter Catherine and dedicated to her father. The film closes with a dedication to all airmen, friend or foe, who fought in the skies above Europe during World War II.

== Plot ==
In the summer of 1943, a fierce battle raged in the skies over Europe. Every day, hundreds of young airmen faced death as they flew bombing raids deep into enemy territory. Fewer and fewer were coming back.

— Opening captions

England – May 16th 1943: The crew of the Memphis Belle, a B-17 Flying Fortress, take a brief respite between missions to play football while the Belle is repaired for her final, twenty-fifth mission. If successful, they will be the first bomber crew in the Eighth Air Force to survive a full tour of duty. In anticipation, Army publicist Lieutenant Colonel Bruce Derringer reviews crewmen files, planning to make them famous war heroes, and use the Belle's accrued record to sell vital war bonds. Squadron commander Colonel Craig Harriman hopes to "give the boys a little break" at their Happy 1st Anniversary dance that evening, but must order ground crews to work all night for tomorrow's mission. Everyone watches the squadron returning from today's mission. The damaged Paddlin Madelin attempts a one-wheeled belly landing, but after coming to a complete stop, it explodes, killing the entire crew.

Derringer photographs and interviews the Belle's crew. Tail gunner Clay Busby divvies Paddlin Madelin crewman Lewis Becker's more "embarrassing" possessions, before attending the dance. Captain Dennis Dearborn talks to his "gal" the Memphis Belle, while Virgil "Virgin" Hoogesteger and British dance gal Faith neck inside the nosecone. Radioman "Danny Boy" Daly encourages Mother and Country's crewman Stan after Danny's fellow Belle crewmates razz the rookie, unsettling him to the point of nervous nausea. Clay sings a number, cutting short Derringer's unlucky speech. Outside, navigator Phil Lowenthal, drunk, shouts "I don't want to die," convinced his last mission is doomed. In the morning bombardier Val Kozlowski gets Lowenthal sobered-up.

Herriman and Major Comstock brief the squadron on today's coordinated 360-plane bombing missions – theirs being an attack beyond the range of escort fighter coverage on a Focke-Wulf Fw 190 aircraft manufacturing plant in Bremen, Germany, dangerously situated next to civilian homes, a hospital, a school and playgrounds. Clouds over Bremen delays take-off. In the downtime, Gunner Richard "Rascal" Moore frets over his "rat trap" belly ball turret, Clay fixes a farmer's reaper-binder while co-pilot Luke Sinclair gripes about a chance at tail-gunning, and Danny recites poetry.

Finally, bombers with catchy names like Hot Lips, Vacillating Virgin, Sweet Dream, Black Eyed Pea, Clooney Baby, Buck A-Roo, Mamas Boys, and Baby Ruth taxi and take off. During formation, the Belle nearly has a mid-air collision. On the way, the crew listens to radio music, telling each other about their post-tour plans. The approach to the target is heavily opposed by enemy fighter planes. The squadron's lead bomber Windy City explodes in front of Memphis Belle, forcing Dearborn to pilot through its burning, smoky debris.

Meanwhile, Harriman chastises Derringer for his "homecoming" party preparations focused exclusively on the Belle, as Harriman has twenty-four crews "up there" and "they are all special to me." Harriman orders Derringer to start reading scores of letters from families who have already lost their sons, brothers, and husbands to the year-long air campaign.

The Belle takes the lead spot after C-Cup suffers severe damage, losing their nose-gunner. Left waist gunner Jack Bocci is knocked down by German fighter fire. Right waist gunner "Genie" McVey discovers Jack is OK, but his harmonica is destroyed, having deflected the bullet. Approaching the target under intense flak, a smoke screen forces Dearborn to expose the formation twice to heavy fire by going around for a second pass. Sinclair gets his chance at the tail gun, but the German fighter he kills splits the Mother and Country in half; only two rookie crewman deploy their parachutes. Dearborn's tactic succeeds – the smoke screen dissipates, allowing bombing of an unobscured target.

On the return trip, the formation is harassed by German fighters, destroying Rascal's ball turret, but he is pulled up to safety. Danny is severely wounded, and damage causes an engine fire. The Belle is forced to drop out of formation to extinguish the fire by diving. Low on fuel, the Belle arrives over England with a damaged electric system and three dead engines. The crew manually deploys the landing gear in time to avoid the disaster that occurred to the Paddlin Madelin. The whole squadron celebrates Memphis Belle's safe return, as Dearborn pops open a bottle of Moët & Chandon Brut Impérial. The Belle's crew accompanies Danny on the ambulance.

The "Memphis Belle" flew her 25th and final mission on 17th May, 1943.
Over a quarter of a million aircraft battled for supremacy in the skies over Western Europe, and nearly 200,000 air-crew lost their lives.
This film is dedicated to all the brave young men, whatever their nationality, who flew and fought in history's greatest airborne confrontation.

— Closing captions

== Cast ==
- Matthew Modine as Captain Dennis Dearborn, pilot: A humourless and socially inept perfectionist, he worked for his family's furniture business and named the titular plane after a woman he met in Memphis, Tennessee.
- Eric Stoltz as Staff Sgt. (T/3) Danny "Danny Boy" Daly, radio operator: An earnest Irish-American, Daly was editor of the school paper, a valedictorian, and joined up right after graduating college.
- Tate Donovan as 1st Lt. Luke Sinclair, co-pilot: The carefree and somewhat narcissistic former lifeguard, who wanted his own plane and is tired of being under Dearborn's command.
- D.B. Sweeney as 1st Lt. Phil Lowenthal, navigator: Lowenthal is pessimistic and superstitious before their final mission, and is convinced that he is doomed to die.
- Billy Zane as 1st Lt. Val Kozlowski, bombardier: While everyone believes the confident, self-assured Kozlowski to be a doctor, it is later revealed he attended only two weeks of medical school before enlisting.
- Sean Astin as Staff Sgt. Richard "Rascal" Moore, ball turret gunner: Diminutive and often boastful, Rascal considers himself a ladies' man and delights in teasing his crewmates, especially Virgil.
- Harry Connick Jr. as Staff Sgt. Clay Busby, tail gunner: After his father lost the family farm in a poker game, the laconic Busby earned money playing the piano in a New Orleans cathouse.
- Reed Edward Diamond as Staff Sgt. (T/3) Virgil "Virge" or "Virgin" Hoogesteger, top turret gunner and flight engineer: He worked at his family's diner and plans to open a restaurant chain, while Rascal constantly mocks him for being a virgin.
- Courtney Gains as Staff Sgt. Eugene "Genie" McVey, right waist gunner: A Catholic Irish-American from Cleveland who shares a cantankerous friendship with fellow waist gunner Bocci.
- Neil Giuntoli as Sgt. Jack Bocci, left waist gunner: A hot-tempered Chicago hoodlum, Bocci shares a cantankerous friendship with fellow waist gunner McVey.
- David Strathairn as Col. Craig Harriman, the sober-minded squadron commander who cares deeply for all his men.
- John Lithgow as Lt. Col. Bruce Derringer, an Army publicist who plans to make the Memphis Belle crew famous for war propaganda.
- Jane Horrocks as Faith, a British girl who has a fling with Virgil at a dance before the squadron's mission.
- Mac McDonald as Les, a member of the squadron's ground crew.
- Steve Mackintosh as Stan the Rookie, a nervous radio operator who is a crewmen on the new B-17, Mother and Country.

== Production ==
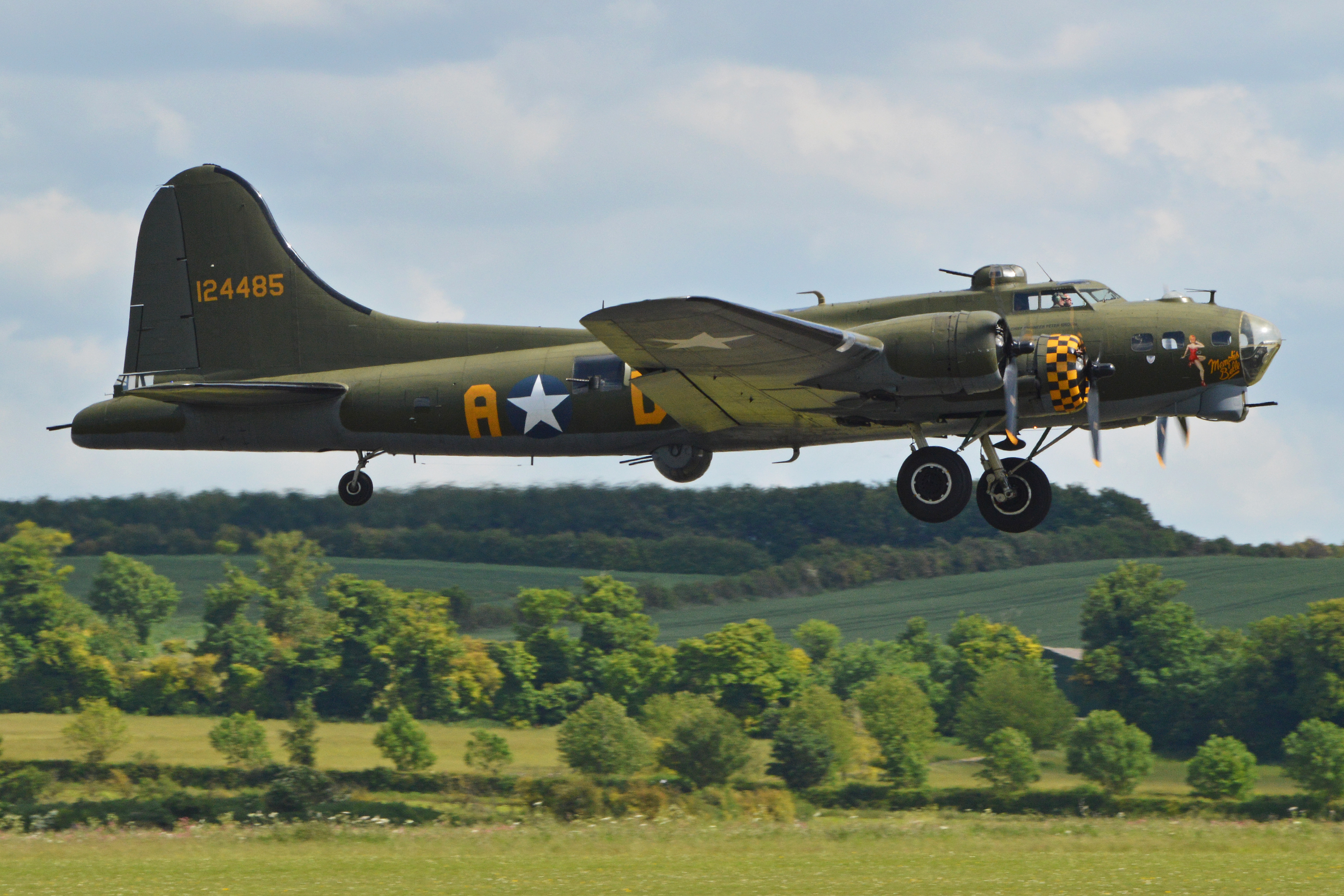
B-17G Sally B in 2014

Five real B-17 warbirds were used in the filming of Memphis Belle, out of eight B-17s that were airworthy during the late 1980s. Two were located in the United States (N3703G and N17W), two were in France (F-BEEA, which was destroyed in a takeoff accident and F-AZDX The Pink Lady), and one was in England (G-BEDF Sally B). N17W is currently on static display at Museum of Flight in Tukwila, WA. The original Memphis Belle was a B-17F model, so any B-17Gs used in the film were heavily modified to look like an earlier F model, having chin turrets removed, tail gun positions retrofitted with older designs and being painted olive drab green. During filming, two B-17s portrayed the Belle (one was the movie version of the Memphis Belle (N3703G) and the other was Sally B for scenes requiring pyrotechnics such as smoke and sparks indicating machine gun "hits") while the rest had nose art and squadron markings changed numerous times to make it appear there were more aircraft.

Ground sequences for the movie (including takeoff and landing scenes) were filmed at the non-operational RAF Binbrook in Lincolnshire, England with a period control tower and vehicles being placed on site. Flying sequences were flown from the airfield site of the Imperial War Museum Duxford. All the extras for the film were obtained from auditions held in the area and included current and former members of the Royal Air Force. The filmmakers also used Pinewood Studios to shoot interior scenes and to shoot various models of B-17s.

A North American B-25 Mitchell was used to film the majority of the aerial scenes with several fixed and trainable cameras also mounted on the available B-17s and fighter aircraft for action shots. A Grumman TBM Avenger (with its tail section painted the same olive drab tones used on the B-17s) was used as back-up for a short time when the B-25 became unserviceable during filming.

The film pilots were warbird display pilots coming from the UK, USA, France, Germany, New Zealand and Norway, the roster changing several times as pilots had to return to their full-time jobs during filming. The flying sequences were devised and planned under the coordination of Old Flying Machine Company (OFMC) pilots Ray Hanna and his son Mark, who also acted as chief pilots for the fighter aircraft used and flew the camera-equipped fighter and TBM Avenger aircraft during filming.

Due to a shortage of actual B-17 airframes, wooden silhouette mock-ups were made and placed at distant parts of the airfield.

=== Filming accident ===
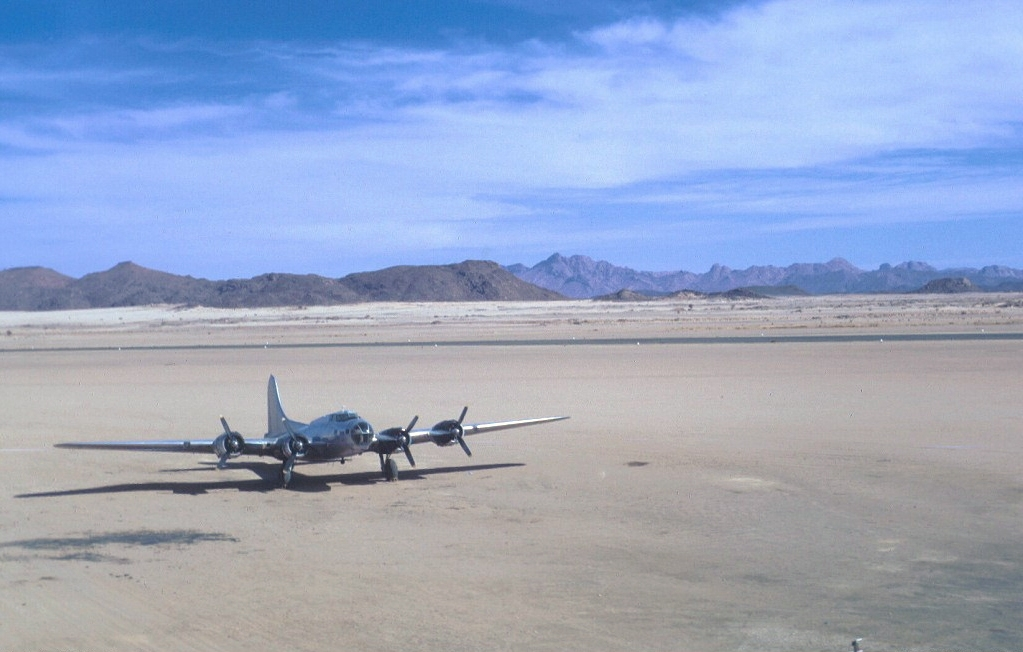
The incident aircraft in 1970

A French B-17G (F-BEEA), used as a filming platform, hit a tree and a pile of gravel after losing engine power and swinging during takeoff from Binbrook and was destroyed by the subsequent fire. All 10 of the crew escaped with only minor injuries, the most serious of which being a broken leg. While lined up on runway 21 awaiting takeoff, a puff of smoke was observed by a ground engineer from the vicinity of engine three which he conjectured could have been due to an over-boost. The aircraft commenced its ground roll and after about 100 yards (91 m) swung slightly to the left, which the commander (the handling pilot) corrected with the rudder and by reducing power to number 3 and 4 engines. Once corrected full power on all engines was resumed but the aircraft swung right. The commander applied corrective rudder and reduced power to number 1 and 2 engines, but this was not immediately effective and the aircraft left the runway before straightening, parallel to the runway. Knowing that the aircraft was capable of being operated from grass landing strips, the pilot opted to continue the takeoff; however, after 400–500 yards (370–460 m) and at an airspeed of 90–95 miles per hour (145–153 km/h) the aircraft swung right and its course was obstructed by a tree which was hit by the left wing and a pile of gravel which was hit by the number 4 propeller. The aircraft yawed to the right and came to rest in a cornfield; the fuselage broke into two sections aft of the bomb bay and caught fire.

== Release ==
The film's world premiere was held at the Empire, Leicester Square in London on 5 September 1990, attended by the Katharine, Duchess of Kent. It opened in the UK on 7 September 1990.

== Reception ==
Memphis Belle received mixed reviews, with Roger Ebert stating the film was "entertaining" yet filled with familiar wartime cliches. "This human element in the experience of the Memphis Belle crew somehow compensates for a lack of human dimension in the characters. We can't really tell the crew members apart and don't much care to, but we can identify with them." UK film reviewer Andy Webb had similar reservations. "Despite its good intentions to highlight the risks and heroics of the brave men who flew dangerous bombing missions deep into enemy soil during World War II, the one thing which you can't miss about Memphis Belle is that it is a cliche commercial production."

On Rotten Tomatoes the film has an approval rating of 68% based on reviews from 25 critics. Audiences surveyed by CinemaScore gave the film a grade A on scale of A to F.

=== Box office ===
The film opened in the UK on 266 screens and grossed £1,174,250 in its opening week, ranking number one at the box office. It was number one in its second week too. It went on to gross £4,924,000 in the UK.

== Soundtrack ==
Memphis Belle (Original Motion Picture Soundtrack)

Soundtrack album by George Fenton
- Released: 1 October 1990
- Recorded: Abbey Road Studios, CTS Studios, and Angel Recording Studios, London, England
- Genre: Soundtrack
- Length: 42:47
- Label: Varèse Sarabande
- Producers: George Fenton; Eliza Thompson

The Original Motion Picture Soundtrack album was recorded at Abbey Road Studios, CTS Studios, and Angel Recording Studios in London, England. The film score by George Fenton was nominated for a BAFTA award for Best Original Film Score in 1991.

Track listing

1. "Londonderry Air" / "Front Titles: Memphis Belle" (traditional / George Fenton) - 3:50
2. "Green Eyes" (Nilo Menendez, Eddie Rivera, Eddie Woods) - 3:25
3. "Flying Home" (Benny Goodman, Lionel Hampton, Sydney Robin) - 2:57
4. "The Steel Lady" (Fenton) - 1:44
5. "Prepare For Take Off" ("Amazing Grace") (traditional) - 2:39
6. "The Final Mission" (Fenton) - 3:51
7. "With Deep Regret..." (Fenton) - 2:02
8. "I Know Why (And So Do You)" (Mack Gordon, Harry Warren) - 2:55 - performed by Glenn Miller and His Orchestra
9. "The Bomb Run" (Fenton) - 1:30
10. "Limping Home" (Fenton) - 2:25
11. "Crippled Belle: The Landing" (Fenton) - 3:26
12. "Resolution" (Fenton) - 1:06
13. "Memphis Belle" (End Title Suite) (Fenton) - 7:37
14. "Danny Boy" (Theme from Memphis Belle) (Frederic E. Weatherly) - 3:20 - performed by Mark Williamson

"The Chestnut Tree", performed by Glenn Miller And His Orchestra and written by Tommie Connor, Jimmy Kennedy and Hamilton Kennedy is featured in the film playing over the Memphis Belle's radio, but isn't on the soundtrack album. The upbeat version of "Danny Boy" performed by Connick at the party is not found on the soundtrack album; a slower version performed by Mark Williamson appears instead.

== Historical accuracy ==
After the release of the film Robert Hanson, the real Memphis Belle's radio operator, spoke to his grandson's high school class. When asked if what happened in the film was true, he replied "No, it didn't all happen to the Memphis Belle, but everything in the movie happened to some B-17". With the exception of the aircraft names, the film is fiction. The characters are composites, the names are not those of the actual crew of the Memphis Belle, and the incidents shown are supposed to be representative of B-17 missions in general. The characters and situations of the film bear little resemblance to the crew of the actual Memphis Belle or the nature of her final mission. No optimistic official celebration on the evening before the Belle's 25th mission occurred, and there was no special welcome for the crew when the mission was over.

For the fighters, seven P-51 Mustangs were used. Five of the P-51s were painted in the markings of the first USAAF Merlin-engined Mustang squadron to operate in Britain (a few months later in 1943 than the actual mission). (Note: P-47 Thunderbolts were the escort at the time in 1943.) As there were no surviving flyable Messerschmitt Bf 109s, Luftwaffe fighter aircraft were represented by Ha-1112s, a Spanish version of the Bf 109 (which were also used to represent Bf 109s in the 1969 film Battle of Britain) in mid-war generic paint schemes.

== See also ==
- Strategic bombing during World War II
