= Mega Disasters =

American television series

- Genre: Documentary; Disaster; History; Science
- Narrated by: J.V. Martin
- Country of origin: United States
- Original language: English
- No. of episodes: 38

Production
- Executive producer: Erik Nelson
- Running time: 45 minutes
- Production company: Creative Differences Productions

Original release
- Network: History Channel
- Release: May 23, 2006 – July 22, 2008

Mega Disasters is an American documentary television series that originally aired from May 23, 2006, to July 22, 2008 on History Channel. Produced by Creative Differences, the program explores potential catastrophic threats to individual cities, countries, and the entire globe.

The two "mega-disasters" of the 2004 Indian Ocean tsunami and Hurricane Katrina in 2005 inspired the series and provided a reference point for many of the episodes. Excepting only two shows devoted to man-made disasters, the threats explored can be divided into three general categories: meteorological, geological, and cosmic hazards.

The Series mostly airs on Viceland.

== Format ==
Each episode of the series generally follows this pattern:

1. An introduction teasing the catastrophic outcome of the threat, along with a flashback of a past disaster of such kind to affect the area.
2. A background on the science and scientists warning about the threat.
3. A presentation of other similar disasters.
4. A recap of the evidence.
5. A hypothetical scenario using 3D computer animation to visually depict the details of a potential disaster.

== Episodes ==
=== Season 1 (2006) ===
No. overall	No. in season	Title	Original release date
1	1	"West Coast Tsunami"	May 23, 2006
The United States faces a potential tsunami threat that mirrors the catastrophic Indonesia tsunami of 2004. Just west of the Oregon coast lies the Cascadia subduction zone where the Juan de Fuca Plate is moving under the North American Plate. A major earthquake here could displace enough water to cause a massive wave to impact along the west coast.
2	2	"Tornado Alley Twister"	May 30, 2006
A tornado scenario striking Dallas, Texas is examined.
3	3	"New York City Hurricane"	June 6, 2006
New York City suffers a Hurricane Katrina-like disaster.
4	4	"American Volcano"	June 13, 2006
Mount Rainier is a ticking time bomb that could dwarf the 1980 eruption of Mount St. Helens, sending massive lahars and mudslides toward the Seattle-Tacoma metropolitan area.
5	5	"Asteroid Apocalypse"	June 20, 2006
The possibility of a cosmic impact on the planet Earth is examined.
6	6	"Earthquake in the Heartland"	June 27, 2006
The New Madrid Fault could reawaken at any time and destroy St. Louis, Missouri and Memphis, Tennessee, like the New Madrid earthquake of 1811-12.
7	7	"Yellowstone Eruption"	July 4, 2006
Yellowstone National Park lies on top of a magma chamber that is 35-miles wide, waiting to erupt. (For further information, see Yellowstone Caldera.)
8	8	"Windy City Tornado"	July 11, 2006
The episode creates a scenario in which Chicago is menaced by three fictional tornadoes.
9	9	"East Coast Tsunami"	July 18, 2006
Cumbre Vieja, a volcano on the island of La Palma in the Canary Islands, off the northwestern coast of Africa, may potentially collapse in the future. If it does, a massive tsunami will be headed right for the East coast of the United States, threatening major cities like New York, Boston, Baltimore, Philadelphia and Miami.
10	10	"Firestorm"	July 25, 2006
The 1917 Halifax Explosion that killed 2000 people in Halifax could happen again if everything went exactly the wrong way in Boston.
11	11	"Mega Freeze"	August 1, 2006
Ice ages can come and go under an abrupt climate change scenario.
12	12	"California's Katrina"	August 8, 2006
What if a super storm causes a flood in Sacramento, California?
13	13	"1906 San Francisco Earthquake"	August 15, 2006
This special-edition episode examines what happened in the 1906 San Francisco earthquake and its effect on San Francisco and looks at the destruction if it were to happen again today.

=== Season 2 (2007) ===
No. overall	No. in season	Title	Original release date
14	1	"Comet Catastrophe"	September 4, 2007
A comet is imagined to strike the Earth and cause major devastation.
15	2	"Gamma Ray Burst"	September 11, 2007
Every few seconds, a supernova emits jets of deadly gamma rays somewhere in the universe. If one of these gamma ray bursts should happen sufficiently close to the Solar System, all life would perish.
16	3	"Krakatoa's Revenge"	September 18, 2007
The 1883 eruption of Krakatoa was one of the deadliest natural disasters in recorded history, claiming over 36,000 lives by the tsunamis it triggered. Another volcanic eruption at Krakatoa, now called Anak Krakatau (meaning "Child of Krakatoa" in Indonesian), could spell curtains for Indonesia.
17	4	"Hawaii Apocalypse"	September 25, 2007
The shield volcanoes that make the Hawaiian Islands will erupt again and cause major destruction by earthquakes and massive lava flows.
18	5	"Methane Explosion"	October 2, 2007
Methane gas precipitates out of the Earth's crust but is easily diluted in the air and in the oceans. Yet, according to one scientist, certain oceanic conditions could trap the gas in regions with low water circulation and build up extreme pressure. Once these areas are disturbed, the gas would blow out of the ocean in powerful jets. If they ignited before diluting, the explosion could cause widespread devastation. The scientist also posits that a similar event caused the Permian extinction.
19	6	"Glacier Meltdown"	October 9, 2007
As temperatures rise, a global meltdown has begun. From the Andes to the Himalayas to the Alps, glaciers are vanishing. In Antarctica and Greenland, vast ice sheets are turning into liquid. The melting ice, running off land, is raising sea levels. As sea levels rise, oceans throughout the world are also becoming hotter. Warmer seas fuel more intense hurricanes. Already, major catastrophes brought on by the process of melting ice, rising seas and intensifying storms have occurred in coastal communities around the world: the South Pacific, Bangladesh and—closer to home—New Orleans. Scientists predict that the worst is yet to come. The rising oceans may swallow some lands forever. By the turn of the century, the map of the world may need to be redrawn and a Category 4 hurricane could drown much of Washington, D.C. in 15 feet of water.
20	7	"Alien Infection"	October 16, 2007
Could an alien infection cause an epidemic on earth? Some experts believe that spacecraft returning from Mars could bring back a harmful sample or comet dust falling into our atmosphere could cause pandemics. One astronomer believes that the 1918 flu pandemic, which killed between 50-100 million people, was one such outbreak and that another "infection" could decimate the world's population. Astrobiologists are now poised to bring Mars samples back to earth to examine them in a Bio 4 level safety lab. In a hypothetical future disaster scenario, track how comet dust would seed the earth with a virulent virus. Quarantine measures don't work and panic ensues.
21	8	"New York Earthquake"	October 23, 2007
An earthquake in New York City may seem unlikely, but a magnitude 5 quake occurred in 1884 and could happen again. Two faults run under Manhattan Island, including the 125th Street Fault where the landscape dips and the subway crosses on an open bridge. Since skyscrapers are designed to withstand windspeeds of 100 mph, most would survive without windows; however, mid-sized masonry structures would collapse. As well, buildings (including smaller skyscrapers) built on landfill in Battery Park are subject to soil liquefaction, tipping over entirely in a major earthquake.
22	9	"Mega Drought"	October 30, 2007
Trends indicate that a major drought event is looming in the not-too-distant future. In as few as three decades we could experience conditions that would make the Dust Bowl of the 1930s seem like an oasis. Efforts to conserve, while admirable and desperately necessary, may already be too late. The episode projects a scenario seventy years into the future in which a twelve-year drought leaves the United States unstable and economically depressed. Western cities are abandoned, states clash for dwindling water supplies and society devolves into a battle for survival.
23	10	"Super Swarms"	November 6, 2007
The locust is one of the most destructive and dreaded life forms on Earth. American pioneers faced the largest swarm of locusts ever recorded. The 1,800 mile long and 110-mile-wide cloud of insects ate their way through the heartland and blocked the sun for five days. Famine ensued, and thousands faced starvation. According to recent studies, the possibility of such a swarm returning to the United States is very likely. The destruction would be unimaginable. (Note: This scenario is now considered to be impossible. The Rocky Mountain locust, the insect responsible for the aforementioned swarm, was last sighted in 1902. Efforts to breed modern North American grasshoppers to recreate the locust have all failed, and recent mitochondrial DNA analysis has strongly suggested that the Rocky Mountain locust was a distinct species. The IUCN formally declared the insect extinct in 2014.)
24	11	"Oil Apocalypse"	November 13, 2007
The oil that our world runs on won't last forever. The gap between supply and demand is ever increasing. Will alternative energy save us or is it already too late? What would happen to the world as we know it when our oil dependent industries come to a grinding halt? A worldwide depression is a certainty but a power struggle for the basic necessities of life would be complete chaos.
25	12	"L.A.'s Killer Quake"	November 20, 2007
It has been a century since the infamous 1906 San Francisco earthquake and Californians live with the knowledge that it's only a matter of time before they're hit again. Los Angeles is the second most populous city in America. If an earthquake hit directly beneath downtown LA, scientists believe that tens of thousands would be killed. Just how would the city respond to a 7.5 magnitude quake? Take a look at how well the emergency responders could cope. A CGI worst-case scenario will show the incredible damage and destruction that would cripple one of the most important cities in the world.
26	13	"The Next Pompeii?"	November 27, 2007
In AD 79, Mount Vesuvius buried Pompeii and killed 3,000 people. The volcano is quiet at the moment, but the only consistency in Vesuvius' eruptive history is a lack of consistency. The danger zone that surrounds the volcano includes the city of Naples and its one million residents; another two million people reside nearby. Scientists know that when Vesuvius erupts again they won't have much warning and another major metropolis will be destroyed.

=== Season 3 (2008) ===
No. overall	No. in season	Title	Original release date
27	1	"Hypercane"	May 6, 2008
Around 65 million years ago, a massive asteroid crashed into Mexico's Yucatán Peninsula. 3/4 of all life on Earth vanished. But could a single asteroid have been the lone killer? Theories about what happened after the impact have been speculated on by the entire scientific community. Ranging from global warming to lethal worldwide firestorms, ideas have been put forth, but none have been conclusively proven. Then in 1995 a new theory claimed that a powerful mega-storm known as a hypercane caused the extinction. The hypercane allegedly reaches 20 miles into the stratosphere and has wind speeds of up to 500 miles per hour. 3-D computer graphics will reveal how this storm could have brought down nearly all life on the planet. One of six episodes about prehistoric megastorms.
28	2	"Noah's Great Flood"	May 13, 2008
About 8,000 years ago, the oceans rose all over the planet as the Ice Age ended. Then, suddenly, the Mediterranean burst its overflown banks, plowing through West Asia and killing thousands of early human settlers caught in its path. After the flood, the waters had swallowed a huge valley that became the Black Sea. This prehistoric mega-flood was the greatest natural disaster in human history. 3-D computer animation shows what the world's greatest deluge may have looked like.
29	3	"Mega Tsunami"	May 20, 2008
In 6,000 BC, 8,000 years before the 2004 Indian Ocean tsunami, a paleotsunami whose waves reach taller than the Statue of Liberty allegedly was generated by a landslide from Mount Etna and ravaged the coasts of the Mediterranean, devastating ancient villages and killing untold numbers. A team of scientists piece together evidence of this megatsunami and show a simulation of this ancient tsunami for the first time. 3-D computer generated animation shows the massive waves that may have changed the course of history.
30	4	"Volcanic Winter"	May 27, 2008
The largest volcanic eruption of the past two million years occurred on the Indonesian island of Sumatra some 75,000 years ago. The impact from the supervolcano Lake Toba decimated the local habitat, but gas, ash and debris from Toba made their way around the planet and formed a shield in the atmosphere that deflected the sun's warming rays. Temperatures plummeted and the planet was thrown into a volcanic winter which may even have pushed the world into an ice age. 3-D computer animation shows the storm and describes how this one volcano could have brought humanity to the verge of extinction.
31	5	"Dam Break"	June 3, 2008
Modern dams are marvels of engineering but after decades of neglect the U.S. infrastructure is in crisis and by 2020, 85% of U.S. dams may be near their breaking point. When the South Fork Dam near Johnstown, Pennsylvania gave way in a storm in 1889, killing 2200 people, it was the worst disaster in U.S. history. Today, with millions of Americans living nearby massive dams, the result of a failure could be catastrophic.
32	6	"Glow Train Catastrophe"	June 11, 2008
The U.S. Department of Energy and the Nuclear Regulatory Commission plan to transport 77,000 tons of nuclear waste to a permanent storage facility 950 feet below Nevada's Yucca Mountain. If the plan goes through, much of the cargo will travel through Las Vegas, making an accident there a very disturbing possibility. If history has taught us anything, it's that transporting dangerous goods can sometimes have catastrophic results. This episode looks at the potential disaster that such a rail accident would cause in Las Vegas.
33	7	"Atlantis Apocalypse"	June 17, 2008
About 3,000 years ago, a volcano erupted on the Aegean island Thira. Some archeologists and scientists theorize that this is what wiped out the Minoan civilization. Near the end, the episode visualizes what could happen if a similar nearby volcano erupted in the same way.
34	8	"Comet Storm"	June 24, 2008
13,000 years ago, a large comet exploded over eastern Canada, creating enormous wildfires that set North America aflame. Every living thing on the continent was incinerated, including an ancient tribe known as the Clovis. This episode's computer-generated animation attempts to show how hell came to earth.
35	9	"Prehistoric English Superflood"	July 1, 2008
Could the island nation of Great Britain have once been connected to Europe by land? This episode presents a new theory and evidence which suggests that the English Channel was created by one of the largest floods ever. Did a violent storm re-shape the European continent? Might this happen again? 3-D animations show what this prehistoric mega storm may have looked like and unravel the mystery behind the creation of England.
36	10	"Airborne Attack"	July 8, 2008
Anthrax is the most feared of all the biological weapons--spores entering the body through the lungs are lethal. In 2001, a simple letter, sent through the US mail, paralyzed a nation, when anthrax spores were found inside. Experts predict that anthrax released over a populated area would result in unprecedented loss of life--a few pounds of anthrax released under the right conditions could kill hundreds of thousands of people. Could anthrax be used to create a worldwide disaster?
37	11	"Deadly Jet Collision"	July 15, 2008
Since commercial aviation truly began in the 1930s, the romance of air travel has been marred by the tragedy of crashes. Unless significant changes continue to be made in airport infrastructure, aviation technology, and professional training, any American airport could be the site of the next Mega Disaster.
38	12	"Toxic Cloud"	July 22, 2008
Chemistry has changed our way of life--from the gasoline in our cars, to the quality of water we drink, to the furniture we sit on. But with modern industry come hazards and risk, including potentially the explosive release of a dangerous chemical. Could a toxic cloud be the next mega disaster?

== See also ==
- It Could Happen Tomorrow, a similar television series on The Weather Channel
- Perfect Disaster, another worst-case scenario series on the Discovery Channel
