= Hell's Angels (aircraft) =

B-17 Flying Fortress

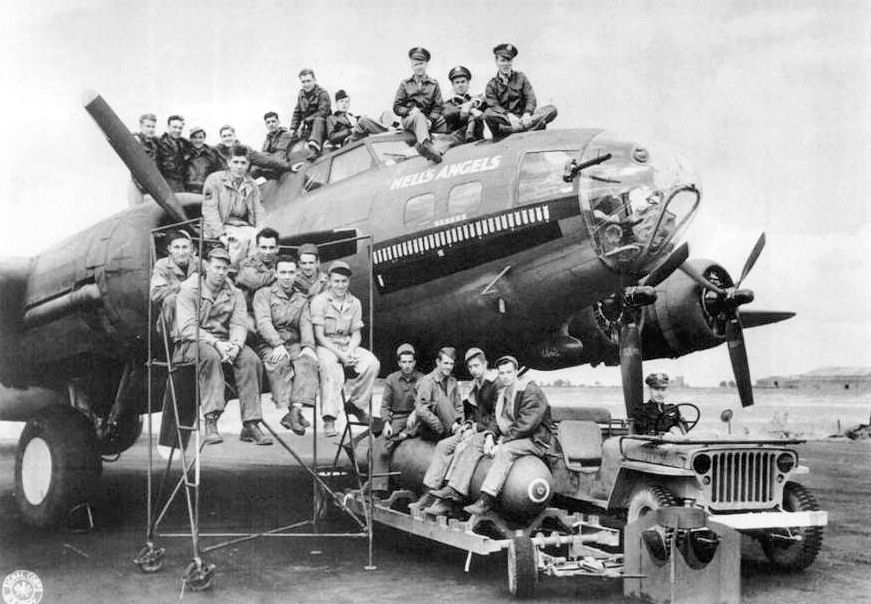
- Hell's Angels with her flight and ground crew after completing her thirty-first mission.

General information
- Type: Boeing B-17F Flying Fortress
- Manufacturer: Boeing Aircraft Company
- Construction number: 3262
- Serial: 41-24577

History
- Fate: Sold for scrap, August 7, 1945

Hell's Angels was a Boeing B-17F Flying Fortress used during the Second World War. It was one of the first B-17s in the 8th Air Force to complete 25 credited combat missions in the European Theater. Ultimately, Hell's Angels would go on to complete 48 missions without any crewman injured or being forced to turn back.

Hell's Angels was often considered the first 8th Air Force B-17 to complete 25 credited combat missions. However, recent research by Mick Hanou, president of the 91st Bombardment Group Memorial Association and historian Jeff Duford, a curator at the National Museum of the United States Air Force, has confirmed that a B-17F of the 323rd Bombardment Squadron, 91st Bombardment Group, serial number 42-5077 and nicknamed Delta Rebel No. 2, completed 25 credited combat missions on 1 May 1943, becoming the first B-17 in the European Theater to complete the feat, two weeks before Hell's Angels. Delta Rebel No. 2, was shot down during the 12 August 1943 mission to Gelsenkirchen, Germany, with six of its crew captured as prisoners of war and four killed in action.
