= More than Human (TV series) =

More than Human is an American reality television show which ran from 2003 to 2004 for 13 episodes. Airing on the Discovery Channel, the series employed first-person accounts of survival to explore the limits of how people are able to "adapt" to extreme situations.
