= Monsters Resurrected =

American documentary television series

Monsters Resurrected is an American edutainment television series that premiered on September 13, 2009, on the Discovery Channel. The program reconstructs extinct animals of both Mesozoic and Cenozoic. It is also called Mega Beasts.

== Episodes ==
No.	Episode title	Plot
1	Terror Bird	The terror bird, Titanis, was depicted as a mortal predator that competed with the smaller, but equally aggressive Canis edwardii and Smilodon gracilis. The force and power of the neck muscles is shown by a rendering of the animal hunting a horse in the beginning of the episode. To kill it, it drives its beak into the vertebral column, severing the spinal cord. Another example of this power is shown when the creature kills a species of ground sloth, using the same method. At the end of the episode, the crew was discussing extinction in the terror bird, two million years ago, and their conclusion was it was outcompeted for food by Smilodon gracilis and Canis edwardii, as well as inability to adapt to climate change.
2	T-rex Of The Deep	In this episode, the Mosasaurs are depicted as the main predators of the Cretaceous seas, competing with the Ginsu sharks and plesiosaurs, eventually driving the former to extinction. It is also shown competing with and killing other mosasaurs.
3	Biggest Killer Dino	Spinosaurus is depicted as the apex predator of its time, killing Rugops, Carcharodontosaurus and Sarcosuchus. After attacking and killing a Rugops, it fights with a Carcharodontosaurus and emerges victorious by smacking its face with a swipe of its claw. The Spinosaurus is then attacked by a Sarcosuchus, but kills it. During the heat, the Spinosaurus attempts to steal a dead titanosaur from a pack of Rugops, but it is eventually overwhelmed by them, breaking its neural spines and dying.
4	Great American Predator	In this episode, Acrocanthosaurus is depicted as an apex predator, strong enough to kill prey ten times its size, like Sauroposeidon (also known as Paluxysaurus). Afterward, a young Acrocanthosaurus is shown being scared off its kill by a pack of Deinonychus and being forced to hunt harder prey, like the ankylosaur Sauropelta.
5	Bear Dog	This episode features the Amphicyon ingens as the new top predator of North America, able to defeat Dinohyus using its intelligence and smaller size to outcompete it. After five million years of dominating the landscape, the bear dog grows bigger, but then Epicyon appears and competes with Amphicyon. They begin to attack and kill the offspring in their burrow, and in the end, the canids outcompete and kill off the bear-dogs.
6	Giant Ripper	In this episode, they recreate the Megalania, the top predator of Australia for hundreds of thousands of years. Hunting the largest marsupials ever to evolve using its senses and (possibly) venom to kill its prey, and it had almost no competition, until humans arrived. The episode also discusses the cryptozoological side about Megalania, ruling out if it could have survived until recent times. It also makes the claim that giant monitor lizards could evolve to become top predator again if humans became extinct.

== Home media ==
The complete 2-disc DVD was released on May 4, 2010 via Amazon. This release did not include Episode 5 (discussing Amphicyon).

== Reception ==
In a mixed review, Riley Black wrote in the magazine Smithsonian, "In the end, Monsters Resurrected left me feeling very conflicted. It was wonderful to see scientists describing real fossil evidence and the minutiae of paleontology—in the wake of Walking with Dinosaurs-type shows, it's good to see scientists make a comeback. Nevertheless, the action sequences of the show make me wonder how much of the scientific content actually got through to viewers. What did they remember after watching the show—the details of Acrocanthosaurus anatomy, or a Spinosaurus ripping into everything it came across with merciless abandon?" In a positive review, Brad Newsome of The Age said "the doco does a fine job of explaining the terror birds' killing power and evolutionary history" and called it "fun and educational".
