= The Cold Blue =

- Film poster
- Directed by: Erik Nelson
- Based on: The Memphis Belle: A Story of a Flying Fortress by William Wyler
- Produced by: Erik Nelson, Peter Hankoff
- Cinematography: William Wyler
- Edited by: Erik Nelson
- Music by: Richard Thompson
- Release date: June 16, 2018
- Running time: 72 minutes
- Country: United States
- Box office: $420,177

The Cold Blue is a 2018 documentary composed from 90 hours of "lost" footage director William Wyler used for his 1944 documentary The Memphis Belle: A Story of a Flying Fortress.

The Memphis Belle documentary was very highly regarded. Unfortunately all existing prints were faded and scratched. In 2016 documentary film-maker Erik Nelson learned the original raw footage from which the film had been cut had been safely deposited in the US National Archives. The original prints were also scratched, faded, and dusty, but had enough information so that new artificial intelligence techniques, frame by frame restoration, and color grading "beautifully restored [the footage] to breathtaking immediacy". When the restoration of the Memphis Belle documentary was finished Nelson used the footage to cut a brand new documentary—The Cold Blue.

The film is 72 minutes long, and premiered at the 2018 AFI Docs. It was then broadcast by HBO.

The National Review asserted the film showed viewers a "level of everyday heroism on offer [that] almost surpasses our capacity to absorb it." Variety described the efforts Nelson made for the soundtrack for the film. The original film was, of course, without sound. So Nelson tracked down the handful of B-17 bombers that remain in flying condition, and used modern sound equipment to capture their exact sound. The film's narration is taken from interviews with the few surviving veterans of the 8th Air Force.
