= A Gray State =

- Film poster
- Directed by: Erik Nelson
- Release date: April 2017 (Tribeca)
- Running time: 1 hr, 32 min

A Gray State is a 2017 documentary film directed by Erik Nelson and executive produced by Werner Herzog, first broadcast on the A&E Network. It explores the death of aspiring filmmaker David Crowley and his murdering of his wife and child in 2014. The film tells the story of Crowley's military service in the Middle East, his efforts to fund and make a film, and explores the circumstances surrounding the deaths. Crowley had been working on a feature film he called Gray State. Herzog and Nelson had previously worked together on 2005's Grizzly Man, which Nelson produced, and Herzog directed.
