= Tour of duty =

Time spent in a hostile or combat environment

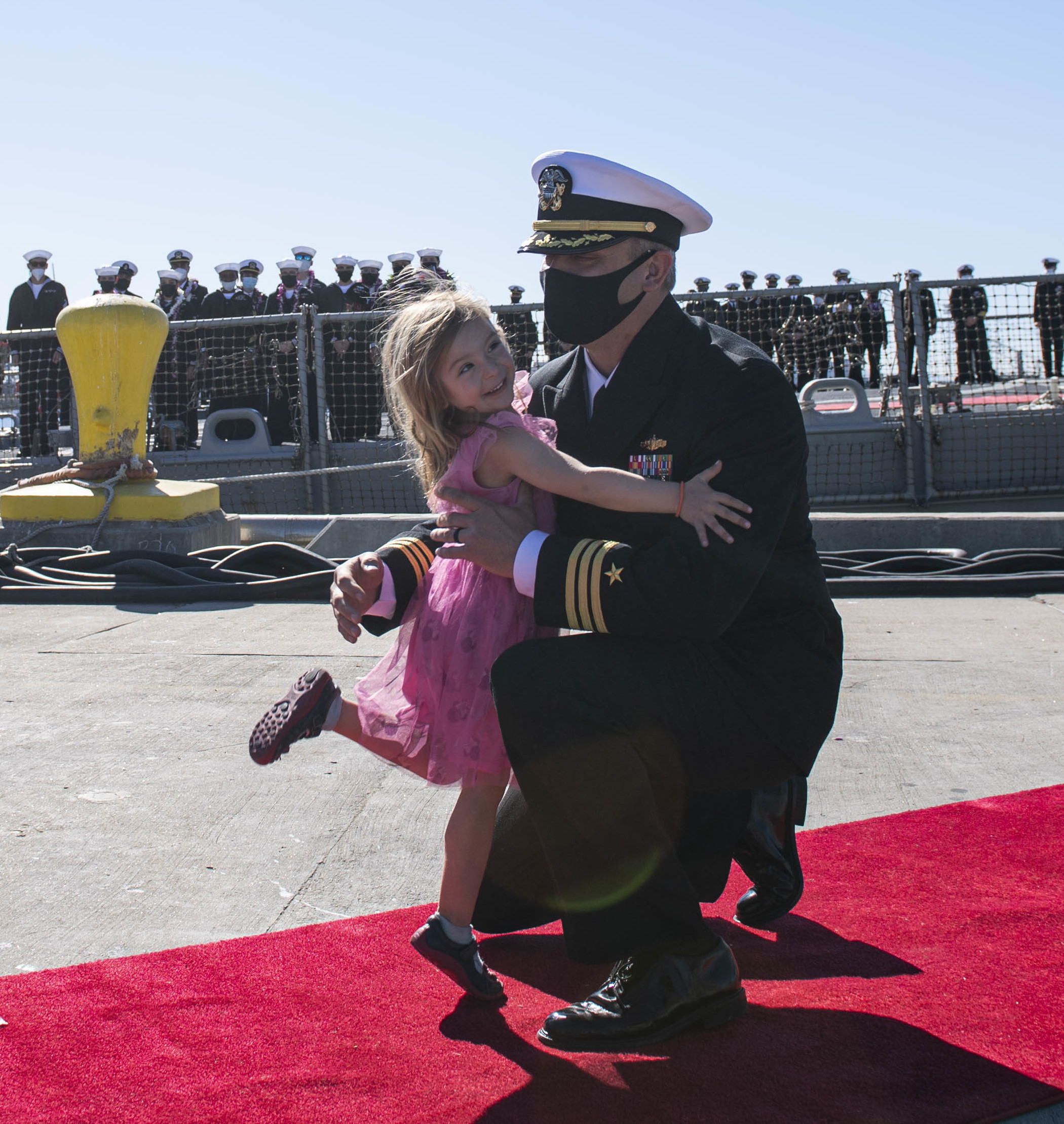
Following a tour of duty, sailors often have the opportunity to reunite with family, friends and other loved ones - Feb. 6, 2022

For military personnel, a tour of duty is usually a period of time spent in combat or in a hostile environment. In an army, for instance, soldiers on active duty serve 24 hours a day, seven days a week for the length of their service commitment. Soldiers in World War II were deployed for the entire war and could be in active service for 4–5 years.

== Air force ==
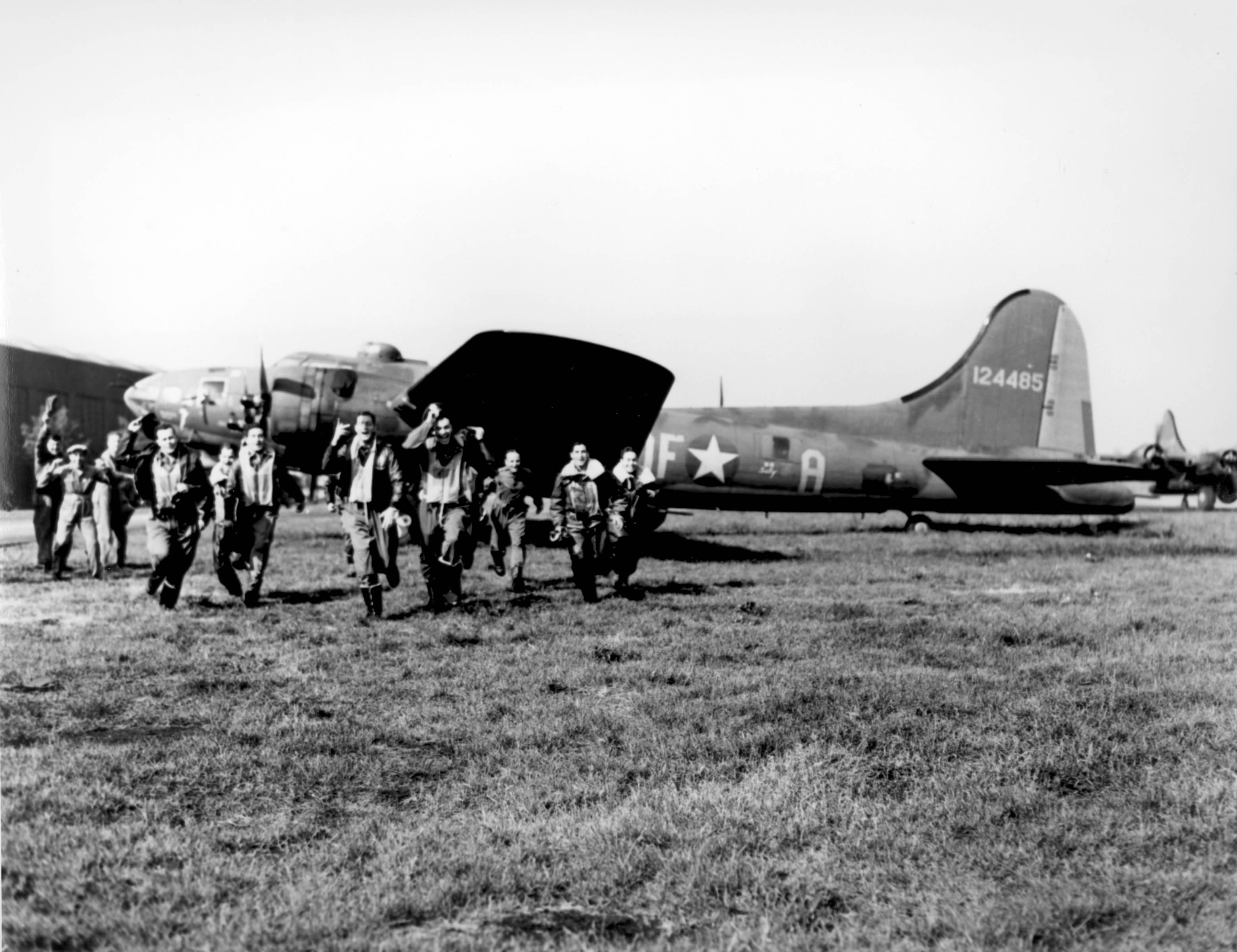
The crew of Memphis Belle returns from their 25th operational mission, thus completing their tour of duty

In World War II, Royal Air Force doctors had started to notice symptoms of battle fatigue in their pilots. Before 1942, there was no official limit for an operational tour. Some pilots had been flying over 200 missions with only a short break. The Senior Medical Officer of the RAF station Biggin Hill intervened, after learning that a flight sergeant had flown 200 missions over two years. A tour system was then adopted; the length of it varied, depending on the period, theatre, and operational requirements of the time. In Western Europe, it was set at 200 hours operational flying. In 1944 in South East Asia, the day fighter pilot's tour was 300 hours or 12 months. In Bomber Command, the tour length was exceptionally based on the number of successful combat sorties (missions). The first tour was 30 sorties, and the second was 20 sorties. In Coastal Command, the maximum length of a tour depended on tasks and varied from 200 hours for fighter and strike squadrons to 800 hours for flying boats and four-engine land-plane crews.

The tour of duty for B-52 crewmen is four to six months.

During WWII in the USAAF bomber command, a tour of duty was 25 missions, and the first bomber B-17 crew to achieve this is that of the Memphis Belle. The first B-24 crew to achieve this was Hot Stuff, but they ended up flying five more missions before returning to the USA to sell war bonds.

== Navy ==
In navies, a tour of duty is a period of time spent performing operational duties at sea, including combat, performing patrol or fleet duties, or assigned to service in a foreign country; a tour of duty is part of a rotation, where the ship may spend a six-month tour of duty, then spend one month in home port for maintenance, then a period of time on exercises, then return to her tour of duty. In 2018, most overseas tours for military personnel in the US Navy have been capped at two or three years. For US Navy sailors assigned to Japan, tour lengths might increase to four years. This would also include tours to Guam and Spain. Sailors extending their tours by at least 12 months will receive preferential consideration for announced billets.

In the Royal Navy (UK), operational tours last approximately nine months, although with the Royal Navy Reserves, the duration is only six months. A junior doctor may be on board a ship for a seven-month stint.

== Army ==
A general tour of duty for soldiers comprises service that can last from half a year to four years. Generally, duties that last longer than two years are eligible to receive medals of merit related to their service. Tours of duty can also be extended involuntarily for service members, such as in September 2006, when the tour of duty was extended for 4,000 US military personnel in Iraq. They were increased up to 15 months for tours in Iraq and Afghanistan. As of 2018, typical tours are 6 to 9 or even 12 months' deployment depending upon the needs of the military and branch of service. Soldiers are eligible for two weeks of leave after six months of deployment.

In the UK, tours of duty are usually 6 months. In 2014, British Army tours in Afghanistan were extended to 8 months. Army doctors accompany their regiments on tours of duty for up to six months every two to three years.

== See also ==
- Roulement
