= Charles H. Barth Jr. =

United States Army general (1903–1943)

- Born: 1 October 1903; Fort Leavenworth
- Died: 3 May 1943 (aged 39); Kaldadarnes, Iceland
- Burial place: West Point Cemetery
- Spouse: Doris Speer
- Relatives: George B. Barth (brother); Charles H. Barth (father)
- Military career
- Branch: United States Army
- Service years: 1921–1943
- Rank: Brigadier General
- Commands: United States Army Forces in the Middle East; European Theater of Operations, United States Army
- Conflicts: World War II
- Awards: Army Distinguished Service Medal; American Defense Service Medal; American Campaign Medal

Charles Henry Barth Jr. (1 October 1903 – 3 May 1943) was an American Brigadier general who served during World War II.

== Early life ==
Charles Henry Barth Jr. was born on 1 October 1903 in Leavenworth, Kansas, the son of Charles H. Barth, a United States Army officer who later rose to the rank of brigadier general during World War I, and Harriet Barth. In 1917, at the age of 13/14, the younger Charles enrolled in Princeton University. In 1921, like his father, Charles was appointed to the United States Military Academy. After four years of study he graduated as Honor Man of the Class in 1925.

== Career ==
Upon graduation in 1925, Barth was commissioned as a second lieutenant in the United States Army Corps of Engineers. He reported to Fort Humphreys, Virginia, for his first duty assignment, where he would also meet and marry his wife, Doris Speer. The following year, in 1926, he enrolled at Cornell University where he earned a degree in Engineering and graduated in June 1927. He then continued studies at the Engineer's Company Officers' School at Fort Humphreys. In July 1928, he became an instructor in the Department of Civil and Military Engineering at West Point and, on 19 July 1928, was promoted to first lieutenant. In his time as an instructor he taught both Chemistry and Electricity.

In 1934 Barth was assigned to the 3rd Engineers in Hawaii, serving as Adjutant. The following year, in 1935, he was promoted to captain. He then was assigned to the Clock Tower in Rock Island, Illinois, where he served as the Military Assistant to the District Engineer. In 1939, he moved to Leavenworth, Kansas, where would attend the Command and General Staff School. Upon graduation in 1940, he would be assigned to assist with construction projects on the Panama Canal. At this assignment he served as Assistant Supervising Engineer, and Supervising Engineer of the Special Engineering Division.

In 1942, Barth was hand picked by Lieutenant General Frank Maxwell Andrews to serve as the Assistant Chief of Staff, G-4, of the U.S. Army Forces in the Middle East. He remained in this role until 1943, where he would follow Andrews to London to the European Theater of Operations, United States Army, where he served as the chief of staff.

== Death and legacy ==
In 1943, Andrews was summoned to Washington, D.C., by General George C. Marshall, the Chief of Staff of the United States Army. Barth went with him, the two hitching a ride with Hot Stuff (aircraft), a heavy bomber that was returning to the United States to complete a morale tour to help sell war bonds. On 3 May 1943 the flight crew had attempted to stop and land in Reykjavík, Iceland, to refuel, however due to poor weather conditions they could not locate the runway. After several failed landing attempts, the plane crashed into the 1,600-foot-tall Mount Fagradalsfjall, near Grindavík.

Barth Hall, headquarters of the Battle Command Training Center at Fort Leavenworth was named for both Barth and his father. As well, a star bearing Barth's name is located on the Princeton University War Memorial.
