= Frank Maxwell Andrews =

United States Army Air Forces general

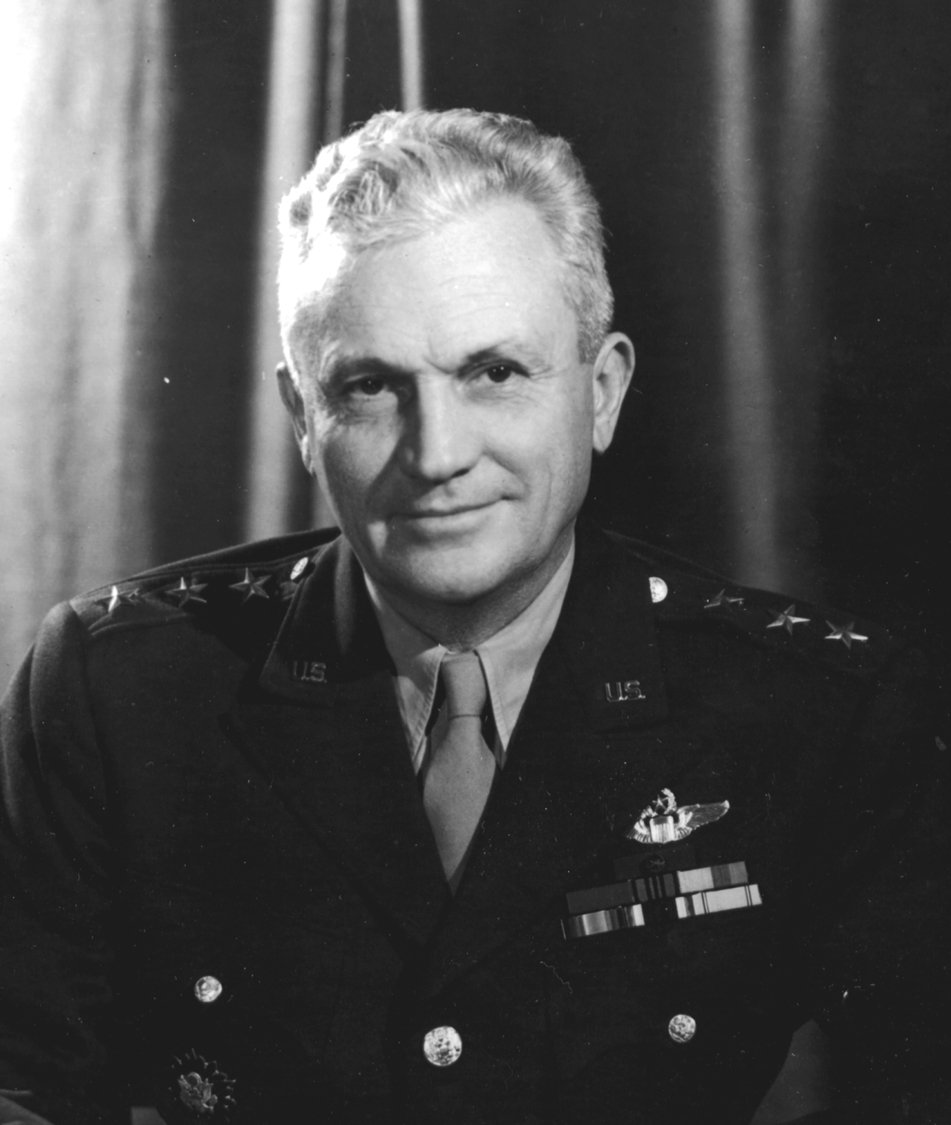
- Born: February 3, 1884; Nashville, Tennessee, U.S.
- Died: May 3, 1943 (aged 59); Mount Fagradalsfjall, Iceland
- Burial place: Arlington National Cemetery
- Military career
- Allegiance: United States
- Branch: United States Army; United States Army Air Forces
- Service years: 1906–1943
- Rank: Lieutenant General
- Nickname: "Andy"
- Commands: European Theater of Operations; U.S. Army Forces in the Middle East; Caribbean Defense Command; Panama Air Force; General Headquarters Air Force; 1st Pursuit Group
- Conflicts: World War I World War II
- Awards: Army Distinguished Service Medal (2); Distinguished Flying Cross; Air Medal (2)

Frank Maxwell Andrews (February 3, 1884 – May 3, 1943) was a senior officer of the United States Army and one of the founders of the United States Army Air Forces, which was later to become the United States Air Force. In leadership positions within the Army Air Corps, he succeeded in advancing progress toward a separate and independent Air Force where predecessors and allies such as Billy Mitchell had failed. Andrews was the first head of a centralized American air force and the first air officer to serve on the Army's general staff. In early 1943, he took the place of General Dwight D. Eisenhower as commander of all U.S. troops in the European Theater of Operations.

Andrews was killed in an airplane accident during an inspection tour in Iceland in 1943. He was the first of four lieutenant generals in the U.S. Army to die during the war, the others being Lesley J. McNair, Simon Bolivar Buckner, Jr. and Millard Harmon. Joint Base Andrews in Maryland (formerly Andrews Air Force Base) is named after him, as well as Andrews Barracks (a kaserne in Berlin, Germany), Frank Andrews Boulevard at Alexandria International Airport (the former England Air Force Base), in Louisiana, General Andrews Airport (demolished) in Santo Domingo, Dominican Republic, Andrews Engineering Building Eglin Air Force Base, Andrews Avenue in Pasay, Philippines and Andrews Theater at Keflavík Naval Base, Iceland, among others.

== Early life and World War I ==
Born in Nashville, Tennessee, Andrews was the grandson of a cavalry soldier who fought alongside Nathan Bedford Forrest and the great-great-nephew of two Tennessee governors, John C. Brown and Neill S. Brown. He graduated from the city's Montgomery Bell Academy in 1901 and graduated from the United States Military Academy at West Point in 1906.

Andrews graduated 42nd in his class and was commissioned a second lieutenant in the 8th Cavalry on June 12, 1906, assigned to the Philippines from October 1906 to May 1907, and then to Fort Huachuca, Arizona. In 1912, he was promoted to an available billet as a first lieutenant in the 2nd Cavalry, at Fort Bliss, Texas, and in 1916 received a promotion to captain in the regiment while at Plattsburgh Barracks, New York.

The United States Army he joined was smaller than that of Bulgaria, but it gave the young second lieutenant ample opportunities to play polo, see the world (serving as aide-de-camp to General Montgomery M. Macomb in Hawaii between 1911 and 1913), and observe the high and low politics of leadership. After marrying Jeannette "Johnny" Allen, the high-spirited daughter of Major General Henry Tureman Allen, in 1914, Andrews gained entrée into elite inner circles of Washington society and within the military. They were the parents of three children: Josephine (1914–1977), Allen (1917–2008), and Jean (b. 1923).

A story related in the press many times during Andrews' lifetime claimed that General Allen forestalled the aeronautical aspirations of his future son-in-law by declaring that no daughter of his would marry a flyer. Andrews' service records, however, show that his commanding officer in the Second Cavalry vetoed his application for temporary aeronautical duty with the Army Signal Corps in February 1914, a decision that held firm despite a plea from the Chief Signal Officer's for reconsideration by higher-ups.

After the United States entered World War I, Andrews was promoted to temporary major on August 5, 1917, and assigned over the objections of his cavalry commander to the Aviation Section, U.S. Signal Corps as part of its wartime expansion. After staff duty in Washington, D.C. in the Office of the Chief Signal Officer between September 26, 1917, and April 25, 1918, Andrews went to Rockwell Field, California, for flying training. There, he earned a rating of Junior Military Aviator at the age of 34. As with nearly all mid-career officers detailed to the Aviation Section, Andrews did not serve in France but as an administrator in the huge training establishment created to provide pilots. He commanded various training airfields in Texas and Florida and served in the war plans division of the Army General Staff in Washington, D.C. Following the war, he replaced Brigadier General Billy Mitchell as Air Officer of the Army of Occupation in Germany, which his father-in-law, General Allen, commanded. While in Germany, Andrews received his permanent establishment promotion to major, Cavalry, when the National Defense Act of 1920 took effect on July 1, and then transferred in grade to the Air Service, which the Act had made a combat arm of the Army, on August 6.

== Air Service and Air Corps duty ==
After returning to the United States in 1923, Andrews again assumed command of Kelly Field, Texas, and he became the first commandant of the advanced flying school established there. In 1927, he attended the Air Corps Tactical School at Langley Field, Virginia, and the following year he went to the Army Command and General Staff School at Fort Leavenworth, Kansas. Promoted to lieutenant colonel, Andrews served as the chief of the Army Air Corps' Training and Operations Division in 1930–1931 before being replaced by the new Chief of the Air Corps, Major General Benjamin D. Foulois. He then commanded the 1st Pursuit Group at Selfridge Field, Michigan. After graduation from the Army War College in 1933, Andrews returned to the General Staff in 1934.

In March 1935, Andrews was appointed by Army Chief of Staff Douglas MacArthur to command the newly formed General Headquarters (GHQ) Air Force, which consolidated all the Army Air Corps' tactical units under a single commander. The Army promoted Andrews to brigadier general (temporary) and to major general (temporary) less than a year later.

A vocal proponent of the four-engine heavy bomber in general and the B-17 Flying Fortress in particular, General Andrews advocated the purchase of the B-17 in large numbers as the Army's standard bomber. MacArthur, however, was replaced as Chief of Staff by General Malin Craig in October 1935. Craig, who opposed any mission for the Air Corps except that of supporting ground forces, and the Army General Staff, actively opposing a movement for a separate air force, disagreed with Andrews that the B-17 had proven its superiority as a bomber over all other types. Instead, it cut back on planned purchases of B-17s to procure smaller but cheaper (and inferior) twin-engine light and medium bombers such as the Douglas B-18.

== Later career, and World War II ==
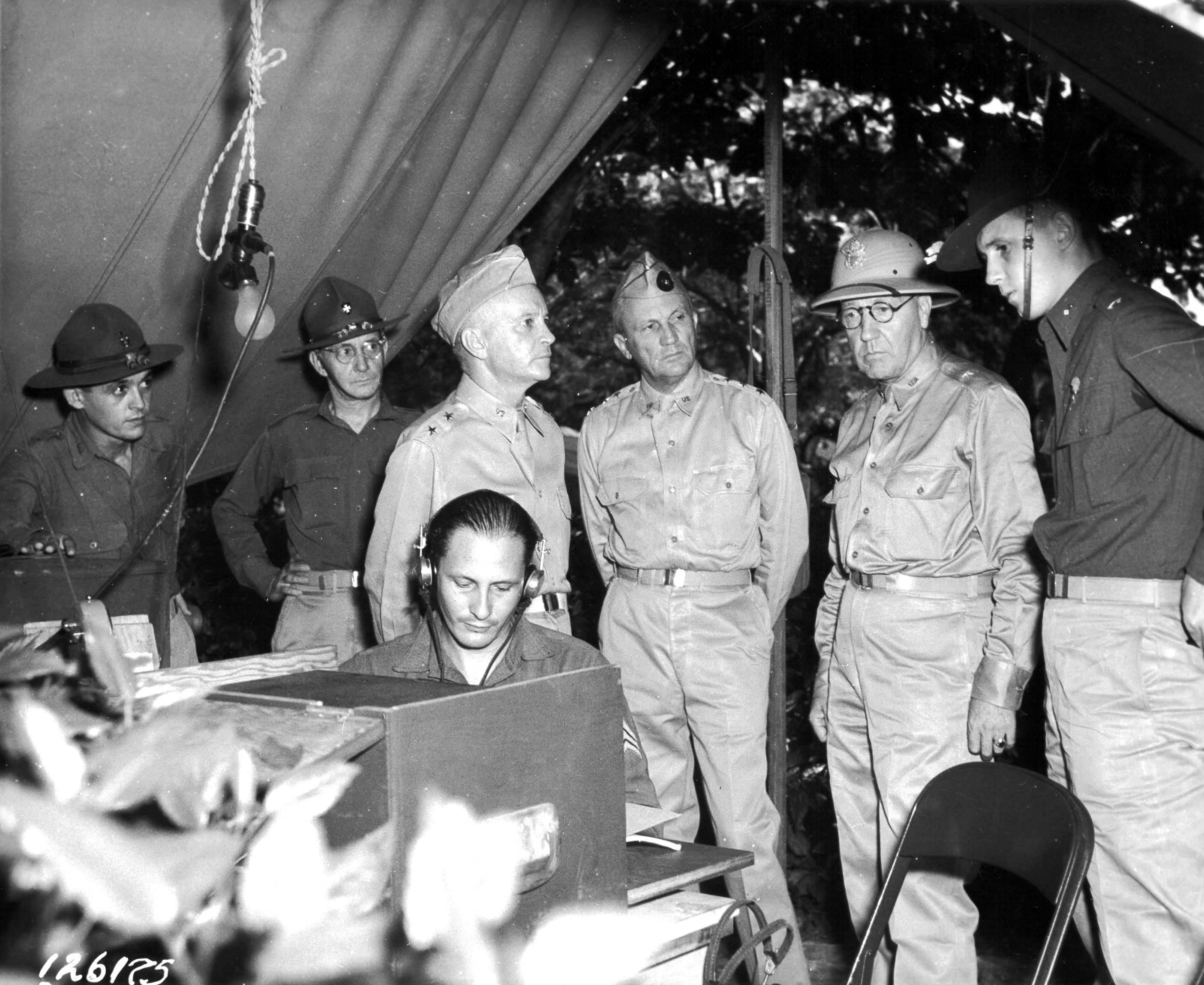
Lieutenant General Andrews (in the middle) inspects a radio set at the Command Post of the Provisional Maneuver Force in Puerto Rico, November 1941. Next to him are generals: James Lawton Collins and Harry C. Ingles.

Andrews was passed over for appointment as Chief of the Air Corps following the death of Major General Oscar Westover in September 1938, partly because of his aggressive support for strategic bombing. He became a trusted air adviser to George C. Marshall, newly appointed as deputy chief of staff of the Army in 1938, but Andrews pushed too hard for the taste of more senior authorities.

In January 1939, after President Franklin D. Roosevelt had publicly called for a large expansion of the Air Corps, Andrews described the United States as a "sixth-rate airpower" at a speech to the National Aeronautic Association, antagonizing isolationist Secretary of War Harry Woodring, who was then assuring the public of U.S. air strength. At the end of Andrews' four-year term as Commanding General of GHQAF on March 1, he was not reappointed, reverted to his permanent rank of colonel, and was reassigned as air officer for the Eighth Corps Area in San Antonio, the same exile to which Billy Mitchell had been sent. Possibly expected to retire, he instead was recalled to Washington just four months later by Marshall after President Roosevelt named Marshall to serve as Chief of Staff following Craig's retirement. His first senior staff selection, Marshall's choice of Andrews and his permanent promotion to brigadier general, prompted furious opposition from Woodring and others, over which Marshall prevailed after threatening to resign his new post. As Assistant Chief of Staff for Operations (G-3), he was in charge of readying the entire Army in the run-up to America's inevitable involvement in the war.

In 1940, Andrews assumed control of the Air Corps' Panama Canal Air Force, and in 1941, he became commander of the Caribbean Defense Command, which had the critically important duty during World War II of defending the southern approaches to the United States, including the vital Panama Canal. In February 1942, General Andrews was in Aruba and witnessed the German submarine attack on the island. That same year he went to North Africa, where he spent three months in command of all United States forces in the Middle East from a base in Cairo.

At the Casablanca Conference in January 1943, Lieutenant General Andrews was appointed commander of all United States forces in the European Theater of Operations, replacing Dwight D. Eisenhower on 4 February so that Eisenhower could give full attention to the North African-Mediterranean Theaters, with the upcoming invasions of Sicily and then Italy. In his memoirs, General Henry H. Arnold, commander of the Army Air Forces in World War II, expressed the belief that Andrews would have been given the command of the Allied invasion of Europe—the position that eventually went to General Eisenhower. General Marshall would say, late in life, that Andrews was the only general he had a chance to groom for a possible Supreme Allied Command later in the war.

== Death ==
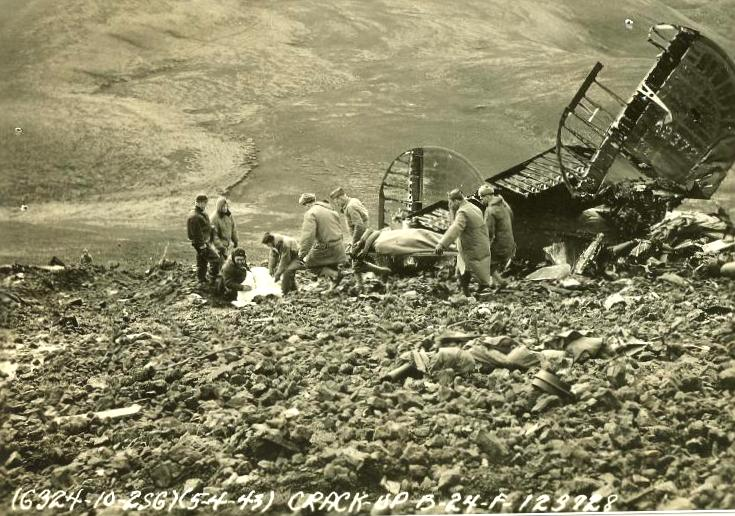
U.S. Army personnel remove bodies from the wreckage of Andrews' B-24 after it struck a mountainside in Iceland, May 1943.

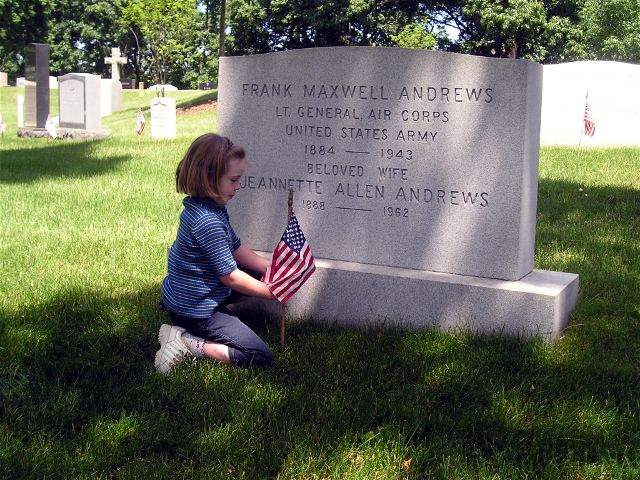
Andrews' grave at Arlington National Cemetery

On May 3, 1943, during an inspection tour, Andrews was killed in the crash of the Hot Stuff, a B-24D-1-CO Liberator, of the 8th Air Force out of RAF Bovingdon, England, on Mt. Fagradalsfjall on the Reykjanes peninsula after an aborted attempt to land at the Royal Air Force Station Kaldadarnes (Iceland). Andrews and thirteen others died in the crash; only the tail gunner, Staff Sergeant George A. Eisel of Columbus, Ohio, survived. Others killed in the crash included Adna Wright Leonard, presiding Methodist bishop of North America, who was on a pastoral tour; Chaplains Colonel Frank L. Miller (Washington, D.C.) and Major Robert H. Humphrey (Lynchburg, Virginia), accompanying Bishop Leonard; Brigadier General Charles H. Barth Jr. (Leavenworth, Kansas) Andrews' chief of staff; Colonel Morrow Krum (Lake Forest, Illinois), press officer for the ETO; Lieutenant Colonel Fred A. Chapman (Grove Hill, Alabama) and Major Theodore C. Totman (Jamestown, New York), senior aides to Andrews; pilot Captain Robert H. Shannon (Washington, Iowa), of the 330th Bombardment Squadron, 93rd Bomb Group; Captain Joseph T. Johnson (Los Angeles); navigator Captain James E. Gott (Berea, Kentucky); Master Sergeant Lloyd C. "George" Weir (McRae, Arkansas); Technical Sergeant Kenneth A. Jeffers (Oriskany Falls, New York); and Staff Sergeant Paul H. McQueen (Endwell, New York).

The B-24D Liberator that crashed, named Hot Stuff, is on record as being the first heavy bomber in the 8th Air Force to complete 25 missions. The plane and its crew also flew 5 more before being pulled to go back to the United States. "Hot Stuff" flew the 25th mission on February 7, 1943, three and a half months before B-17 "Memphis Belle", but as the B-24 was destroyed in the crash, the War Department chose to send the B-17 home and celebrate it as the second B-17 to complete 25 missions (the first B-17 to complete was Hell's Angel).

Andrews was the highest-ranking Allied officer to die in the line of duty to that time in the war. At the time of his death, he was Commanding General, United States Forces, European Theatre of Operations. Camp Springs Army Air Field, Maryland, was renamed Andrews Field (later Joint Base Andrews), for him on February 7, 1945.

Andrews is buried at Arlington National Cemetery.

== Legacy ==
Joint Base Andrews, located a few miles southeast of Washington, D.C. and the home base of Air Force One, is named in honor of Andrews.

A Royal Air Force airfield called RAF Station Great Saling, in England was renamed after him, Andrews Field, in Essex, England. It was the first airfield constructed in 1943 by army engineers in the United Kingdom during World War II. It was notable as having been the only renamed US airfield in the United Kingdom during World War II. It was used by the USAAF 96th Bombardment Group (Heavy) and the 322nd Bombardment Group (Medium) during the war, and also by several RAF squadrons before being closed in 1946. Today, a small part of the former wartime airfield is still in use as a small private flying facility.

Andrews Avenue, a road leading to the Philippines' Ninoy Aquino International Airport Terminal 3 was named after him.

At Naval Air Station Keflavik in Iceland, Andrews Theater was named after him.

The University of Tennessee Air Force ROTC's Arnold Air Society squadron and Silver Wings chapter are named in honor of Andrews.

In 1986, Andrews was enshrined in the National Aviation Hall of Fame

== Awards ==

USAAF Command pilot badge
| Army Distinguished Service Medal with bronze oak leaf cluster | | Distinguished Flying Cross |
| Air Medal with bronze oak leaf cluster | Philippine Campaign Medal | World War I Victory Medal |
| Army of Occupation of Germany Medal | American Defense Service Medal with service star | American Campaign Medal with service star |
| European–African–Middle Eastern Campaign Medal with two bronze campaign stars | World War II Victory Medal | Companion of the Order of the Bath (United Kingdom) |
| Order of Abdon Calderón (Ecuador) | Officer of the Legion of Honor (France) | Medal of Merit (Panama) |

Military offices
| Preceded by Dwight D. Eisenhower | Commanding General of U.S. Army Europe; 4 February – 3 May 1943 | Succeeded by Jacob L. Devers |
