= Charles H. Barth =

United States Army general (1858–1926)

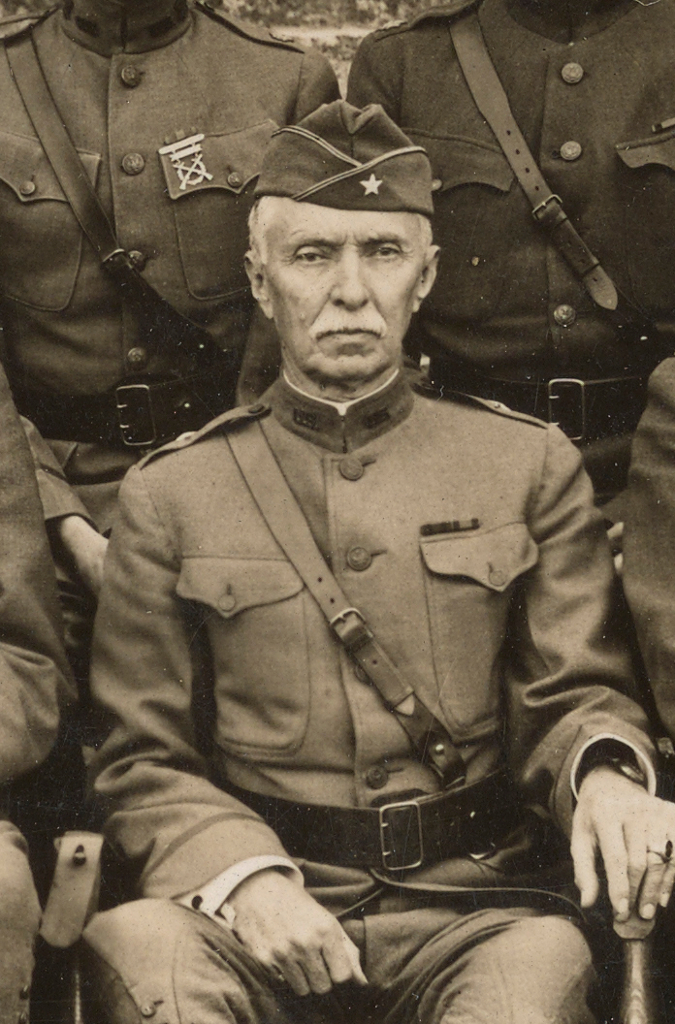
- Charles H. Barth, Ancy-le-Franc 1918
- Born: December 28, 1858; Sheridan, Iowa, U.S.
- Died: December 5, 1926 (aged 67); Leavenworth, Kansas, U.S.
- Relatives: MG George B. Barth (son); BG Charles H. Barth Jr. (son)
- Military career
- Allegiance: United States of America
- Branch: United States Army
- Service years: 1881–1922
- Rank: Brigadier General
- Commands: 77th Division
- Conflicts: Apache Wars; Philippine–American War; World War I
- Awards: Silver Star Citation; Legion of Honor; Croix de Guerre

Charles Henry Barth (December 28, 1858 – December 5, 1926) was an American Brigadier general who served during World War I.

== Early life ==
Barth was born in Sheridan, Iowa. He entered the United States Military Academy, where he was seriously handicapped by recurring malaria in a time when sick leave for cadets was unknown. He graduated number thirty-two of fifty-three in the class of 1881.

== Career ==
Upon graduation, Barth was commissioned in the 12th Infantry where he took part in the campaign against Geronimo, the notorious Apache.

He had frontier duty from 1881 to 1882 and again from 1887 until 1889. In 1899, Barth went to the Philippines with his regiment and was cited for gallantry in action.

From September 1903 to December 1905, Barth was an instructor in military art at the Infantry and Cavalry School at Fort Leavenworth. While in that assignment, he published his translation of Major General Otto F. W. T. von Griepenkerl's Letters on Applied Tactics in 1906. In 1908, he graduated from Army War College and was retained as an instructor. He became a thirty-third degree Mason on October 20, 1909.

In the fall of 1910, he had a second tour of duty in the Philippines, then was at the Presidio in Monterey until October 1912, when he was promoted to lieutenant colonel. He became adjutant general in Atlanta, Georgia and from there went to Laredo, Texas. He then did a third tour in the Philippines, where he commanded in Manila.

On August 5, 1917, Barth was promoted to brigadier general and from August to October 1917 he commanded Camp Jackson, in South Carolina. From July to October 1918, he trained the Seventh Infantry Division at Camp MacArthur, Texas and took it to France where he commanded it in action at Metz shortly before the armistice.

When arriving back to the United States, Barth commanded the 62nd Infantry Regiment at Camp Lee, Virginia. This regiment was mustered out and he went back to the Philippines for his fourth and last tour of duty there. When returning to the States, he received his promotion to brigadier general.

Barth retired on December 28, 1922, after which he was appointed governor of the National Military Home at Fort Leavenworth where he served until his death.

== Awards ==
Barth was awarded the Silver Star Citation, as well as the Distinguished Service Medal twice from the United States. He received the Croix de Guerre and Officer of the Legion of Honor from France.

== Death and legacy ==
Charles H. Barth died at the age of sixty-seven on December 5, 1926.

Barth Hall, a building on the post at Fort Leavenworth, is named after Charles H. Barth. He married Carrie Bittmann and they were the parents of two sons. Both attended the United States Military Academy and George B. “Bitt” Barth (1897–1969) distinguished himself several times during World War II and Korea. He received the Distinguished Service Cross and retired as major general in the 1950s. Charles Barth's second son, Charles H. Barth Jr. (1903–1943) reached the rank of brigadier general and died on 3 May 1943 while his plane was attempting to land at Kaldadarnes, Iceland.

== Bibliography ==
- Davis, Henry Blaine Jr. (1998). Generals in Khaki. Raleigh, North Carolina: Pentland Press. ISBN 1571970886. OCLC 40298151.
