= Effusive eruption =

Type of volcanic eruption characterized by steady lava flow

Video of lava agitating and bubbling in the volcano eruption of Litli-Hrútur, Iceland, 2023

An effusive eruption is a type of volcanic eruption in which lava steadily flows out of a volcano onto the ground.

== Overview ==
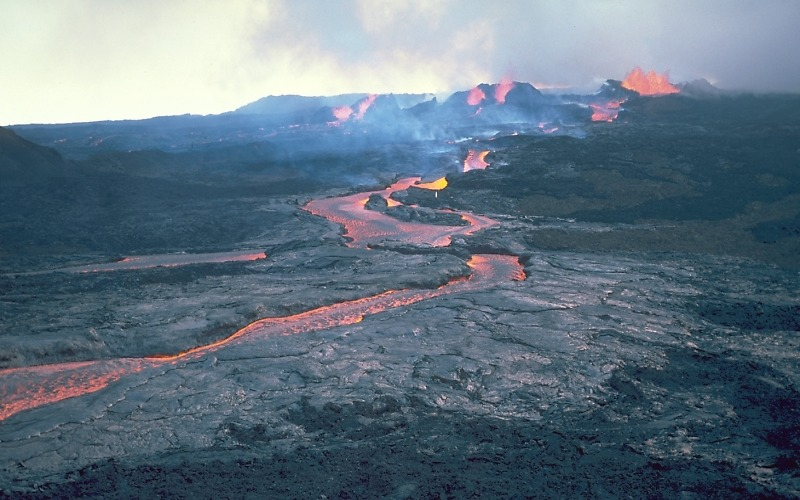
Effusive eruption of basaltic ʻaʻā lava at Mauna Loa in 1984

There are two major groupings of eruptions: effusive and explosive. Effusive eruption differs from explosive eruption, wherein magma is violently fragmented and rapidly expelled from a volcano. Effusive eruptions are most common in basaltic magmas, but they also occur in intermediate and felsic magmas. These eruptions form lava flows and lava domes, each of which vary in shape, length, and width. Deep in the crust, gasses are dissolved into the magma because of high pressures, but upon ascent and eruption, pressure drops rapidly, and these gasses begin to exsolve out of the melt. A volcanic eruption is effusive when the erupting magma is volatile poor (water, carbon dioxide, sulfur dioxide, hydrogen chloride, and hydrogen fluoride), which suppresses fragmentation, creating an oozing magma which spills out of the volcanic vent and out into the surrounding area. The shape of effusive lava flows is governed by the type of lava (i.e. composition), rate and duration of eruption, and topography of the surrounding landscape.

For an effusive eruption to occur, magma must be permeable enough to allow the expulsion of gas bubbles contained within it. If the magma is not above a certain permeability threshold, it cannot degas and will erupt explosively. Additionally, at a certain threshold, fragmentation within the magma can cause an explosive eruption. This threshold is governed by the Reynolds number, a dimensionless number in fluid dynamics that is directly proportional to fluid velocity. Eruptions will be effusive if the magma has a low ascent velocity. At higher magma ascent rates, the fragmentation within the magma passes a threshold and results in explosive eruptions. Silicic magma also exhibits this transition between effusive and explosive eruptions, but the fragmentation mechanism differs. The 1912 Novarupta eruption and the 2003 Stromboli eruption both exhibited a transition between explosive and effusive eruption patterns.

== Basaltic eruptions ==
Basaltic composition magmas are the most common effusive eruptions because they are not water saturated and have low viscosity. Most people know them from the classic pictures of rivers of lava in Hawaii. Eruptions of basaltic magma often transition between effusive and explosive eruption patterns. The behavior of these eruptions is largely dependent on the permeability of the magma and the magma ascent rate. During eruption, dissolved gasses exsolve and begin to rise out of the magma as gas bubbles. If the magma is rising slowly enough, these bubbles will have time to rise and escape, leaving a less buoyant magma behind that fluidly flows out. Effusive basalt lava flows cool to either of two forms, ʻaʻā or pāhoehoe. This type of lava flow builds shield volcanoes, which are, for example, numerous in Hawaii, and is how the island was and currently is being formed.

== Silicic eruptions ==
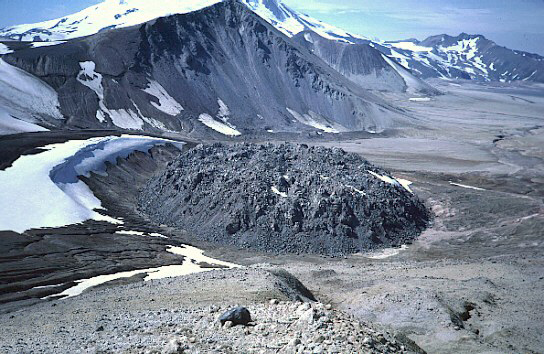
Alaskan volcano Novarupta with an effused lava dome at the summit.

Silicic magmas most commonly erupt explosively, but they can erupt effusively. These magmas are water saturated, and many orders of magnitude more viscous than basaltic magmas, making degassing and effusion more complicated. Degassing prior to eruption, through fractures in the country rock surrounding the magma chamber, plays an important role. Gas bubbles can begin to escape through the tiny spaces and relieve pressure, visible on the surface as vents of dense gas. The ascent speed of the magma is the most important factor controlling which type of eruption it will be. For silicic magmas to erupt effusively, the ascent rate must be 10^{−5} to 10^{−2} m/s, with permeable conduit walls, so that gas has time to exsolve and dissipate into the surrounding rock. If the flow rate is too fast, even if the conduit is permeable, it will act as though it is impermeable and will result in an explosive eruption. Silicic magmas typically form blocky lava flows or steep-sided mounds, called lava domes, because their high viscosity does not allow it to flow like that of basaltic magmas. When felsic domes form, they are emplaced within and on top of the conduit. If a dome forms and crystallizes enough early in an eruption, it acts as a plug on the system, denying the main mechanism of degassing. If this happens, it is common that the eruption will change from effusive to explosive, due to pressure build up below the lava dome.
