= Fagradalsfjall =

Volcano in Iceland

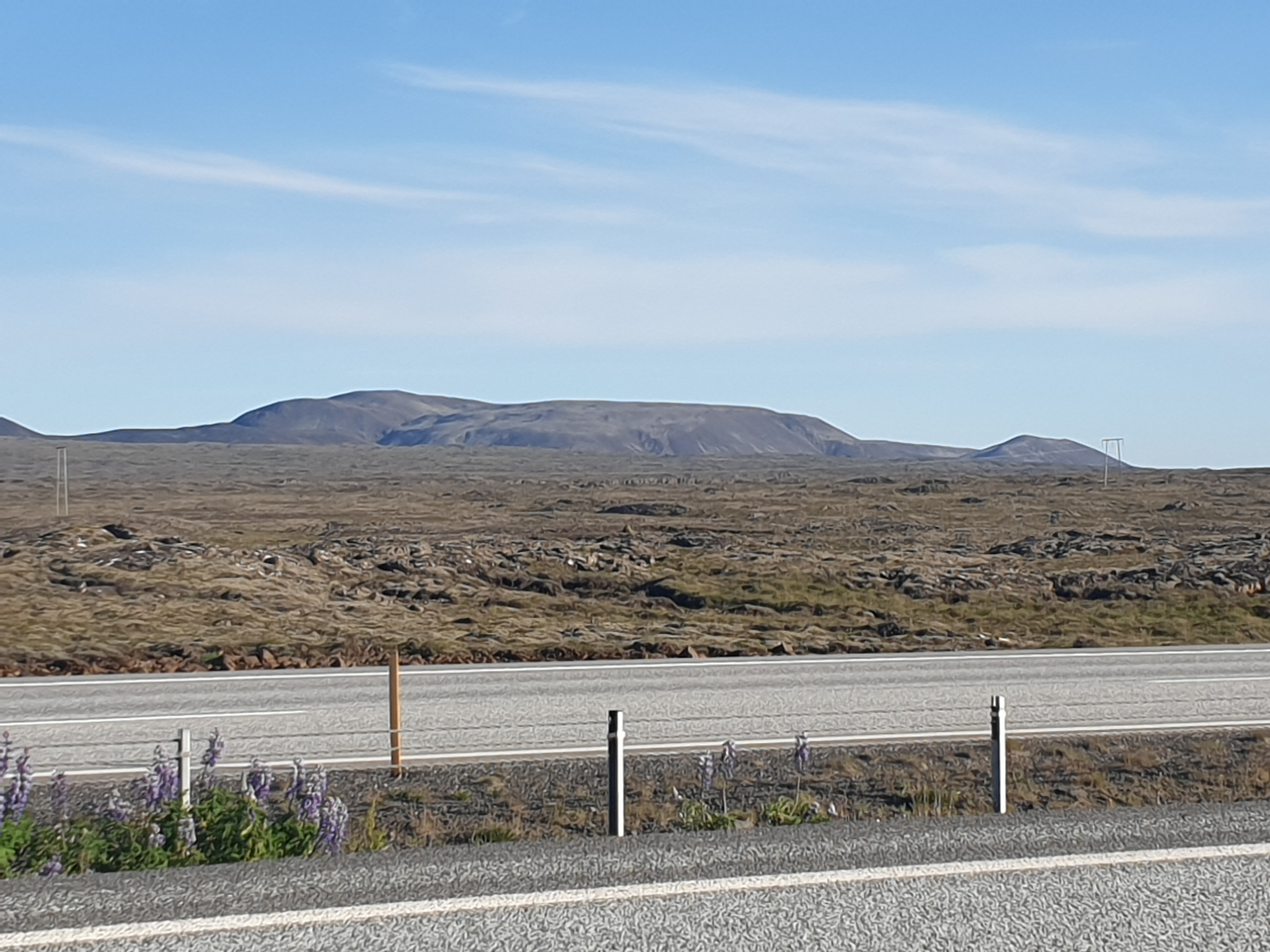
- Fagradalsfjall seen from Reykjanesbraut

Highest point
- Elevation: Mountain: 385 m (1,263 ft)
- Coordinates: 63°54′18″N 22°16′21″W

Geography
- Location within Iceland
- Selected geological features near the Fagradalsfjall volcanic system (approximate outline in red). Legend: Fagradalsfjall; fissure swarms; central volcanoes; calderas; subglacial terrain above 1,100 m (3,600 ft); seismically active areas between 1995 to 2007; Clicking on the rectangle enlarges and enables mouse-over with more detail Iceland

Geology
- Mountain type(s): Tuya and fissure system
- Last eruption: 10 July 2023

Fagradalsfjall, (Icelandic: [ˈfaɣraˌtalsˌfjatl̥]) also commonly known as the Reykjavík vulcano, is an active tuya volcano formed in the Last Glacial Period on the Reykjanes Peninsula, around 40 kilometres (25 mi) from Reykjavík, Iceland. Fagradalsfjall is also the name for the wider volcanic system covering an area 5 kilometres (3 mi) wide and 16 kilometres (10 mi) long between the Eldvörp–Svartsengi [ˈɛltvœr̥p–ˈsvar̥(t)sˌeiɲcɪ] and Krýsuvík systems. The highest summit in this area is Langhóll [ˈlauŋkˌhoutl̥] (385 m (1,263 ft)). No volcanic eruption had occurred for 815 years on the Reykjanes Peninsula until 19 March 2021 when a fissure vent appeared in Geldingadalir to the south of Fagradalsfjall mountain. The 2021 eruption was effusive and continued emitting fresh lava sporadically until 18 September 2021.

The eruption was unique among the volcanoes monitored in Iceland so far and it has been suggested that it could develop into a shield volcano. Due to its relative ease of access from Reykjavík, the volcano has become an attraction for local people and foreign tourists. Another eruption, very similar to the 2021 eruption, began on 3 August 2022, and ceased on 21 August 2022. A third eruption appeared to the north of Fagradalsfjall near Litli-Hrútur [ˈlɪhtlɪ-ˌr̥uːtʏr̥] on 10 July 2023, and ended on 5 August 2023.

== Etymology ==
The name is a compound of the Icelandic words 'fagur' ("fair", "beautiful"), 'dalur' ("dale", "valley") and 'fjall' ("fell", "mountain"). The mountain massif is named after Fagridalur ([ˈfaɣrɪˌtaːlʏr̥], "fair dale" or "beautiful valley") which is at its northwest. The 2021 lava field is named Fagradalshraun [ˈfaɣraˌtalsˌr̥œyːn].

== Tectonic setting ==
The mountain Fagradalsfjall is a volcano in areas of eruptive fissures, cones and lava fields also named Fagradalsfjall. The Fagradalsfjall fissure swarm was considered in some publications to be a branch or a secondary part of the Krýsuvík-Trölladyngja volcanic system on the Reykjanes Peninsula in southwest Iceland, but scientists now consider Fagradalsfjall to be a separate volcanic system from Krýsuvík and it is regarded as such in some publications. It is in a zone of active rifting at the divergent boundary between the Eurasian and North American plates. Plate spreading at the Reykjanes peninsula is highly oblique and is characterized by a superposition of left-lateral shear and extension. The Krýsuvík volcanic system has been moderately active in the Holocene, with the most recent eruptive episode before the 21st century having occurred in the 12th-century CE. The Fagradalsfjall mountain was formed from an eruption under the ice sheet in the Pleistocene period, and it had lain dormant for 6,000 years until an eruption fissure appeared in the area in March 2021. The wider peninsula had been dormant for nearly 800 years, since the end of the Reykjanes Fires in 1240.

The unrest and eruption in Fagradalsfjall are part of a larger unrest period on Reykjanes Peninsula including unrest within several volcanic systems and among others also the unrest at Þorbjörn volcano next to Svartsengi and the Blue Lagoon during the spring of 2020. However, eruptions at this location were unexpected as other nearby systems on the Reykjanes Peninsula had been more active.

The 2021 eruption is the first to be observed on this branch of the plate boundary in Reykjanes. It appears to be different from most eruptions observed where the main volcanoes are fed by a magma chamber underneath, whose size and pressure on it determine the size and length of eruption. This eruption may be fed by a relatively narrow and long channel (~ 17 km (11 mi)) that is linked to the Earth's mantle, and the lava flow may be determined by the properties of the eruption channel. However, the channel may also be linked to a deep magma reservoir located near the boundary between the crust and the mantle. Some scientists believed that volcanic activities in the area may last for decades.

== 2019 to 2021 activity and eruptions ==
=== Precursors ===
Beginning December 2019 and into March 2021, a swarm of earthquakes, two of which reached magnitude M_{w} 5.6, rocked the Reykjanes peninsula, sparking concerns that an eruption was imminent, because the earthquakes were thought to have been triggered by dyke intrusions and magma movements under the peninsula. Minor damage to homes from a 4 February 2021 magnitude 5.7 earthquake was reported. In the three weeks before the eruption, more than 40,000 tremors were recorded by seismographs.

=== Eruption fissures in Geldingadalir ===
On 19 March 2021, an effusive eruption started at approximately 20:45 local time in Geldingadalir ([ˈcɛltiŋkaˌtaːlɪr̥]; (Note: "Gelding valleys", as the valley was used to graze geldings. That valley is now filled with new lava and cannot be seen.) the singular "Geldingadalur" [ˈcɛltiŋkaˌtaːlʏr̥] is also often used) to the south of Fagradalsfjall, the first known eruption on the peninsula in about 800 years. Fagradalsfjall had been dormant for 6,000 years. The eruptive activity was first announced by the Icelandic Meteorological Office at 21:40. Reports stated a 600–700-metre-long (2,000–2,300 ft) fissure vent began ejecting lava, which covered an area of less than 1 square kilometre (0.39 mi^{2}). As of the March eruptions, the lava flows posed no threat to residents, as the area is mostly uninhabited.

The eruption has been called Geldingadalsgos ([ˈcɛltiŋkaˌtalsˌkɔːs] "Geldingadalur eruption"). On 26 March, the main eruptive vent was at 63.8889°N 22.2704°W, on the site of a previous eruptive mound. The eruption may be a shield volcano eruption, which may last for several years. It could be seen from the suburbs of the capital city of Reykjavík and had attracted a large number of visitors. However, high levels of volcanic gases such as carbon dioxide and carbon monoxide made parts of the area inaccessible.

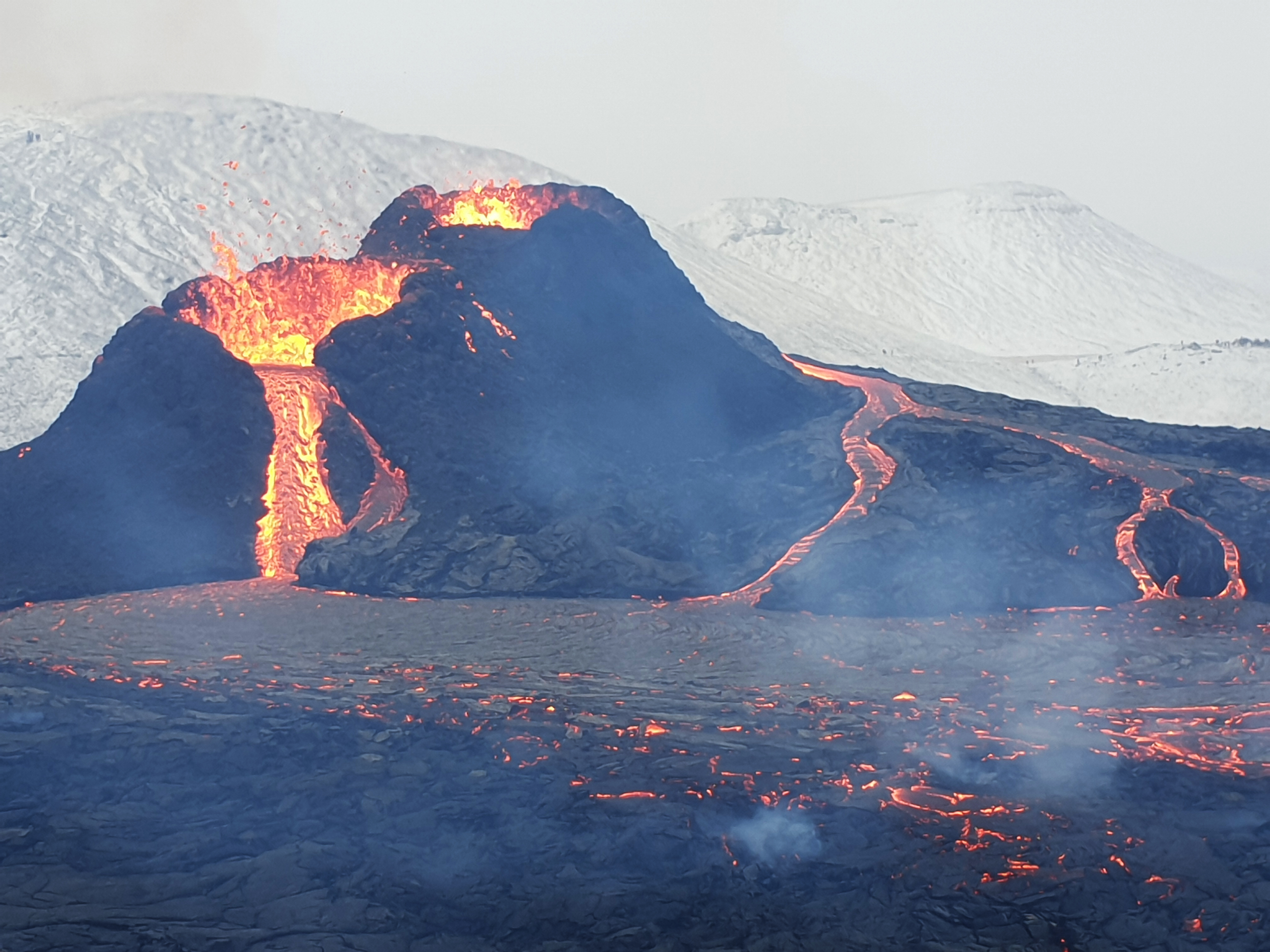
Geldingadalir eruption near Fagradalsfjall, 24 March 2021

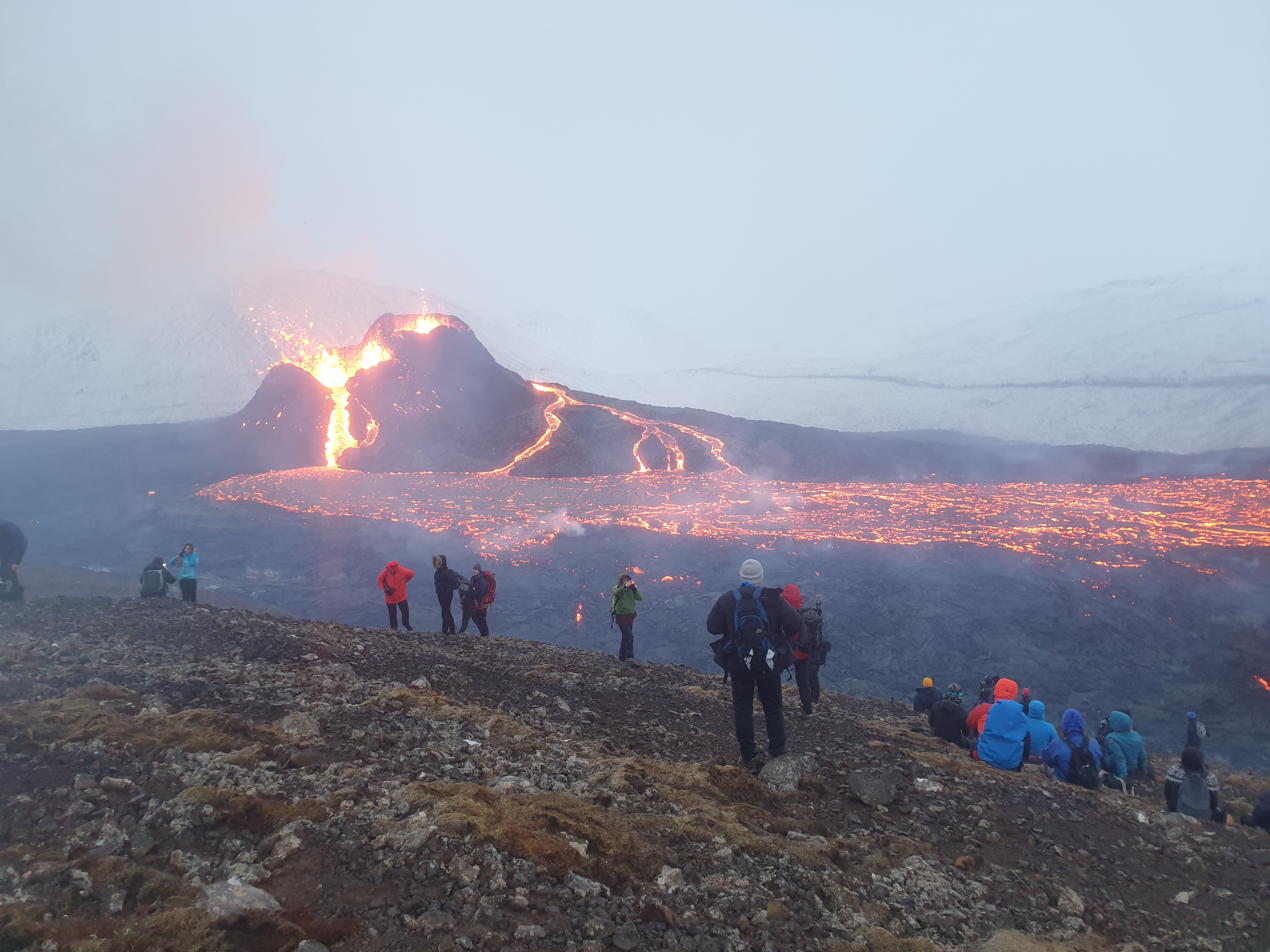
People on the slopes of Fagradalsfjall, watching the Geldingadalir eruption

Video of eruption from helicopter

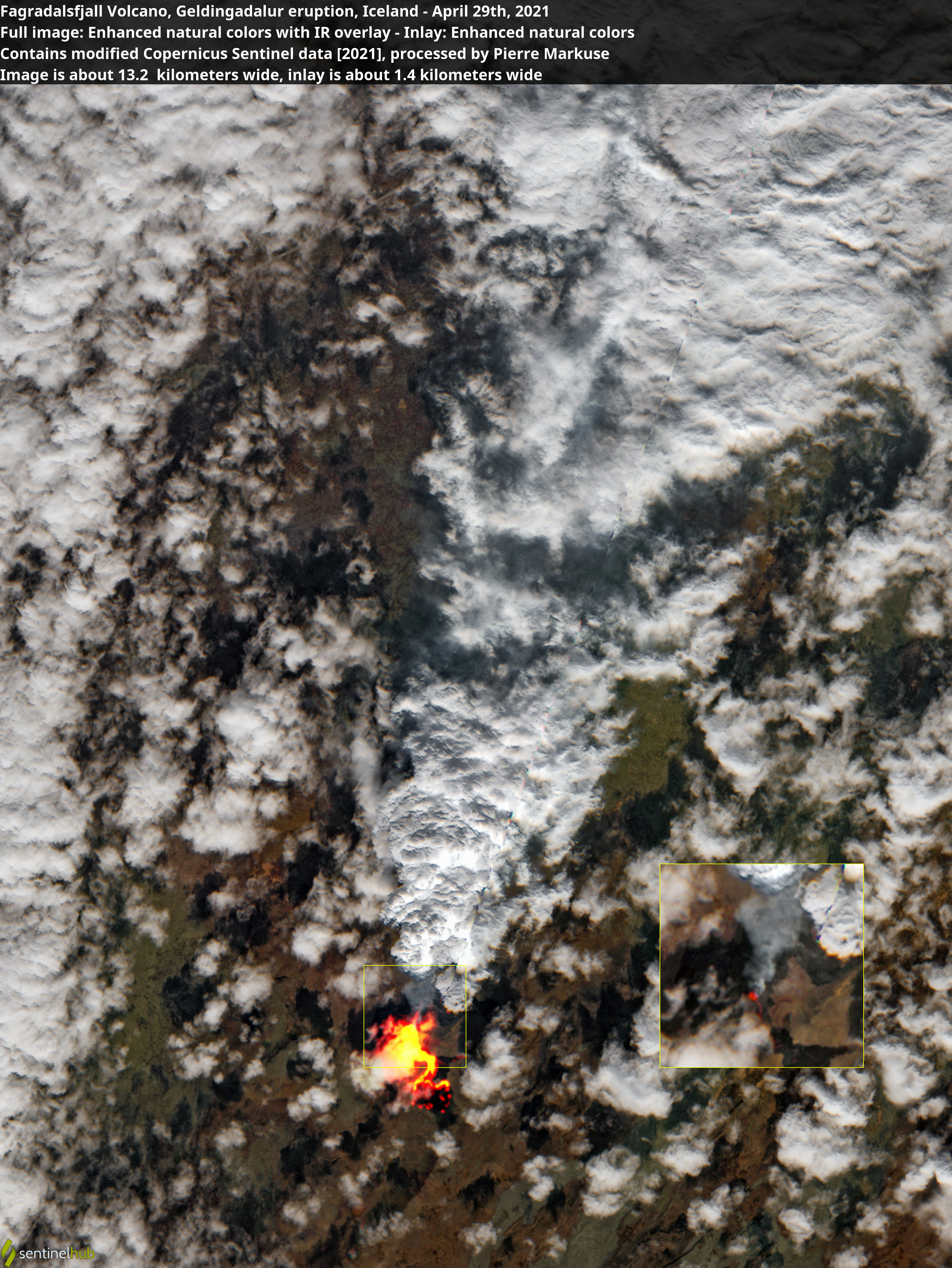
Satellite image from 29 April 2021

On 13 April 2021, four new craters formed in Geldingadalir within the lava flows. The lava output which had been somewhat reduced over the last days, increased again.

=== Eruption fissures on Fagradalsfjall ===
Around noon on 5 April 2021, a new fissure, variously estimated to be between about 100 and 500 metres (300 and 2,000 ft) long, opened a distance of about 1 kilometre (0.6 mi) to the north/north-east of the still-active vents at the center of the March eruption. As a precaution the area was evacuated by the coast guard.

Some time later, another eruption fissure opened parallel to the first on the slopes of Fagradalsfjall.

The lava production of all open eruption fissures in the whole was estimated on 5 April 2021, being around 10 m^{3}/s (350 cu ft/s) and is flowing into the Meradalir valleys ([ˈmɛːraˌtaːlɪr̥], "mare dales") via a steep gully.

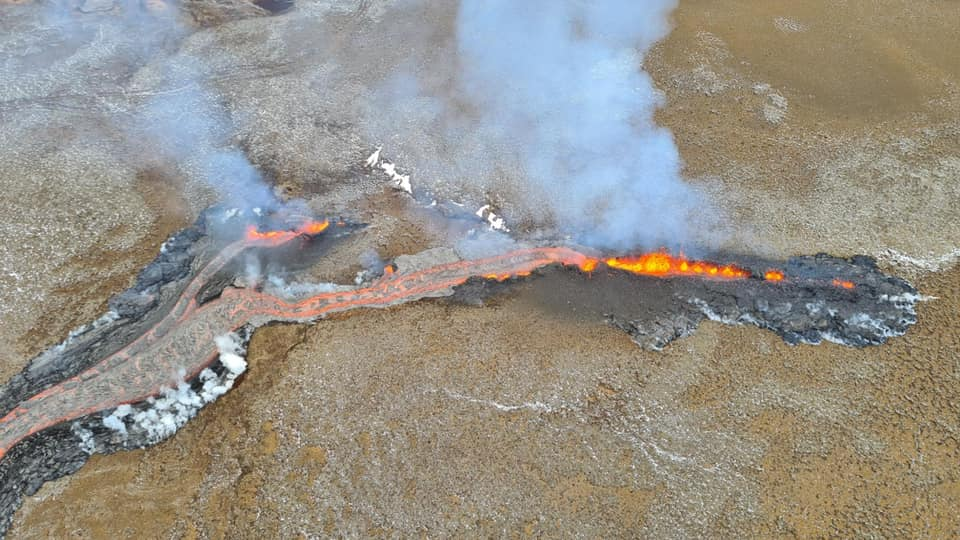
The new eruption fissures

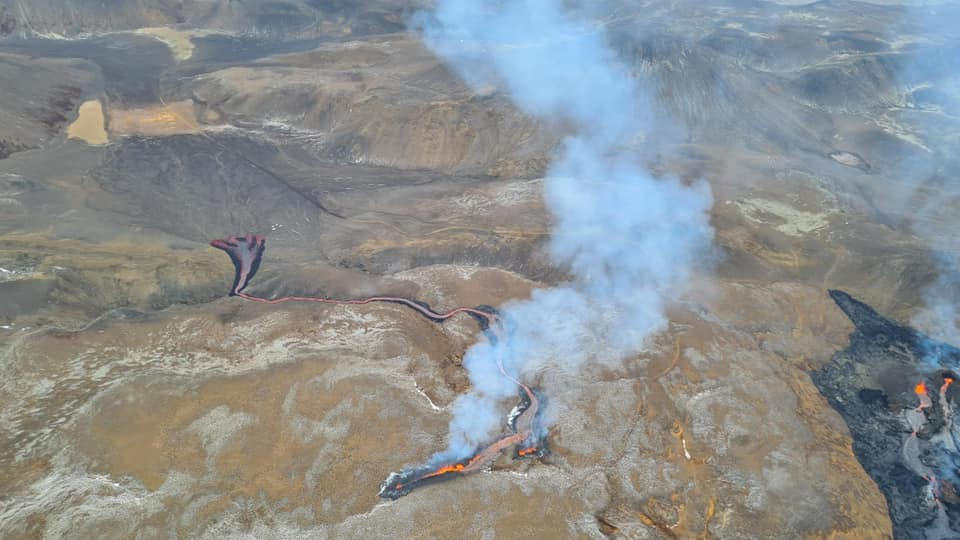
The new eruption fissures to the left, the older ones to the right, seen from a helicopter, view to the east

About 36 hours later, around midnight on 6–7 April, another eruption fissure opened up. It is about 150 m (490 ft) long and about 400–450 m (1,300–1,500 ft) to the north-east of the first fissure, between the Geldingadalur fissures and the ones on the slope of the mountain. Search and rescue crews observed a new depression, about 1 m (3 ft) deep there the previous day. The lava from this fissure flowed into Geldingadalur valley.

Another fissure opened during the night of 10–11 April 2021 between the two open fissures on the slopes of Fagradalsfjall. In total, 6 fissures had opened until the 13 April and at each fissure, activity concentrated and formed individual vents. Towards the end of April, activity at most vents, apart from Vent 5, started to decrease.

By 2 May 2021, only one fissure, Vent 5 that appeared near the initial eruption site on Geldingadalir, remained active. It developed into a volcano with the occasional explosive eruptions within its crater that sometimes reached heights of hundreds of meters. The rim of the volcano itself had risen to a height of 334 m (1,096 ft) above sea level by September 2021. The lava flowed into the Meradalir valleys, and later the Nátthagi [ˈnauhtˌhaijɪ] valley.

A number of smaller openings appeared temporarily, one small vent was reported to have erupted near the main crater on 1 July. On 14 August, lava spurted from what appeared to be a hole on the crater wall, and this turned out to be an independent eruption. Cracks appeared on Gónhóll [ˈkouːnˌhoutl̥] that was once popular with spectators in August but no lava flowed at the site. After eight and a half days of inactivity at the main volcano, lava broke through the surface in the lava field to the north of the crater in a number of places.

=== Lava and gas output: Development of the eruption ===
The eruption showed distinct phases in its eruption pattern. The first phase lasted for about two weeks with continuous lava flow of around 6 m^{3}/s (210 cu ft/s) from its first crater, the second phase also lasted around two weeks with new eruptions to the north of the first crater with variable lava flow of 5–8 m^{3}/s (180–280 cu ft/s). This is followed by a period of two and a half months of eruption at a single crater with largely continuous and sometimes pulsating eruption and lava flow of around 12 m^{3}/s (420 cu ft/s) lasting until the end of June. From then on until early September was a phase of fluctuating eruption with periodic strong lava flow interrupted by periods of inactivity.

On 12 April, scientists from the University of Iceland measured the lava field's area to be 0.75 km^{2} (0.29 sq mi) and its volume to be 10.3 million m^{3} (360 million cu ft). The flow rate of the lava was 4.7 m^{3}/s (170 cu ft/s), and sulfur dioxide, carbon dioxide and hydrogen fluoride were being emitted at 6,000, 3,000 and 8 tonnes per day (5,900, 3,000 and 7.9 long tons per day) respectively.

The lava produced by the eruption shows a composition differing from historical Reykjanes lavas. This could be caused by a new batch of magma arriving from a large magma reservoir at a depth of about 17–20 km (11–12 mi) at the Moho under Reykjanes.

Examples of basaltic lava collected in late March

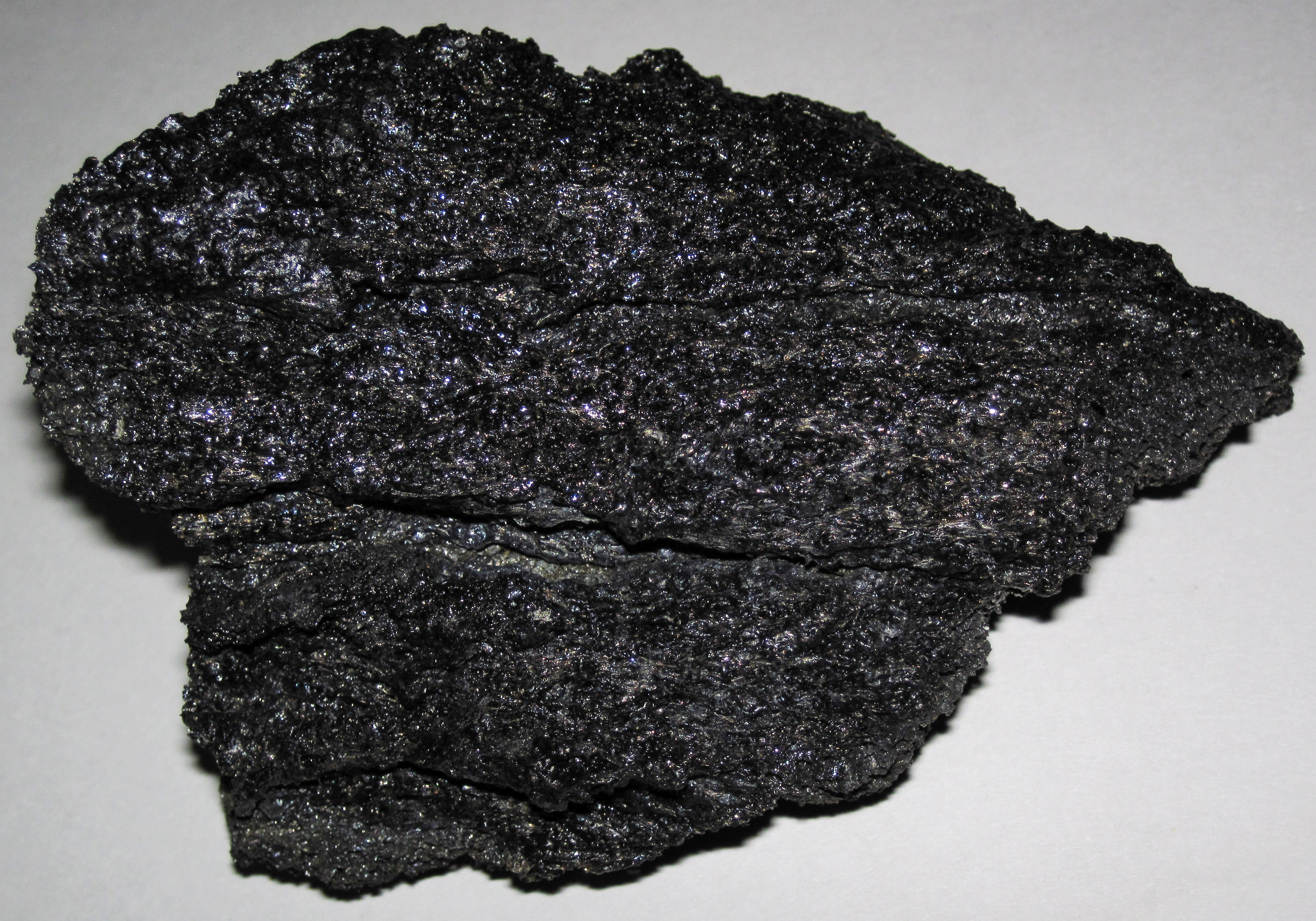

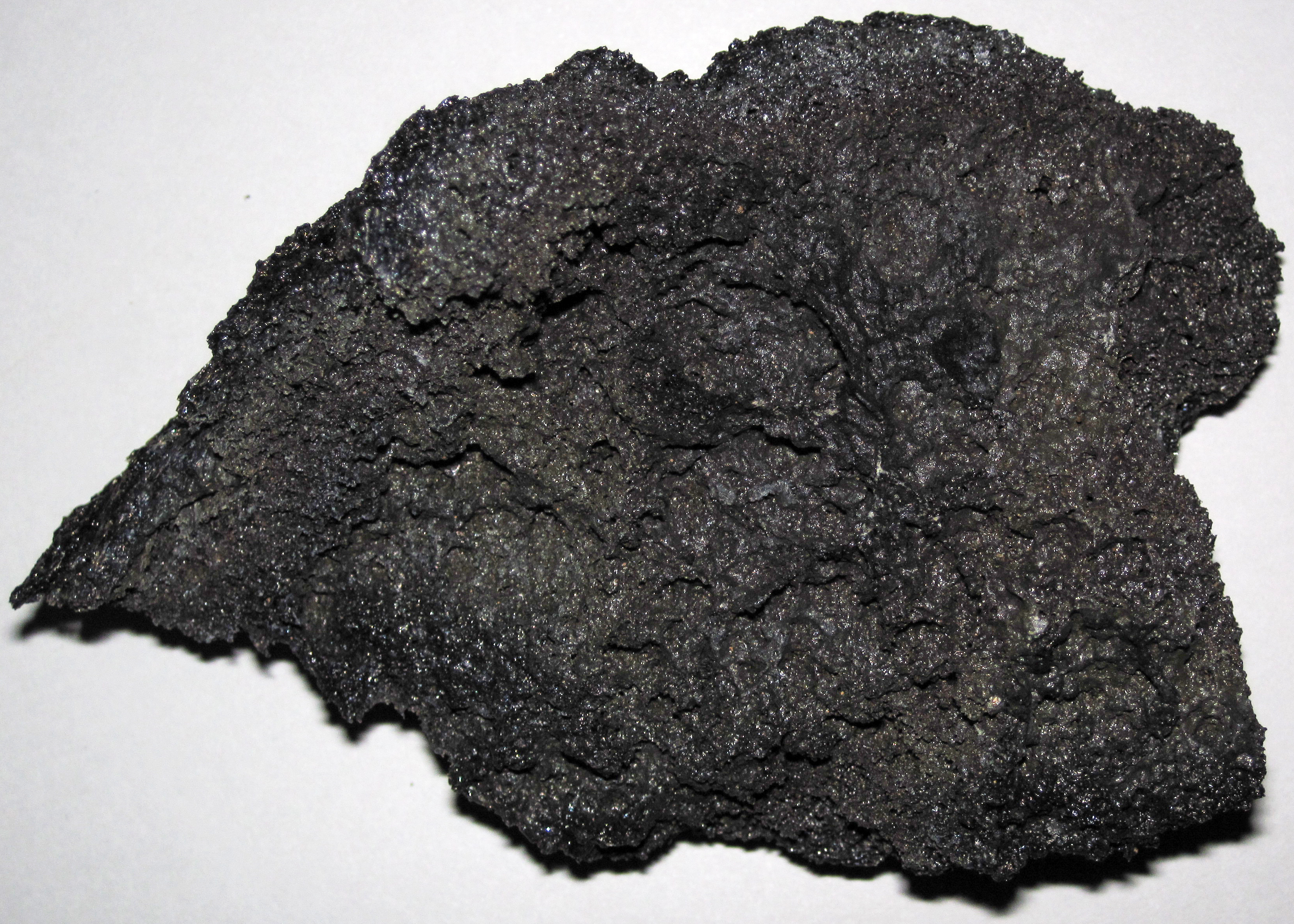

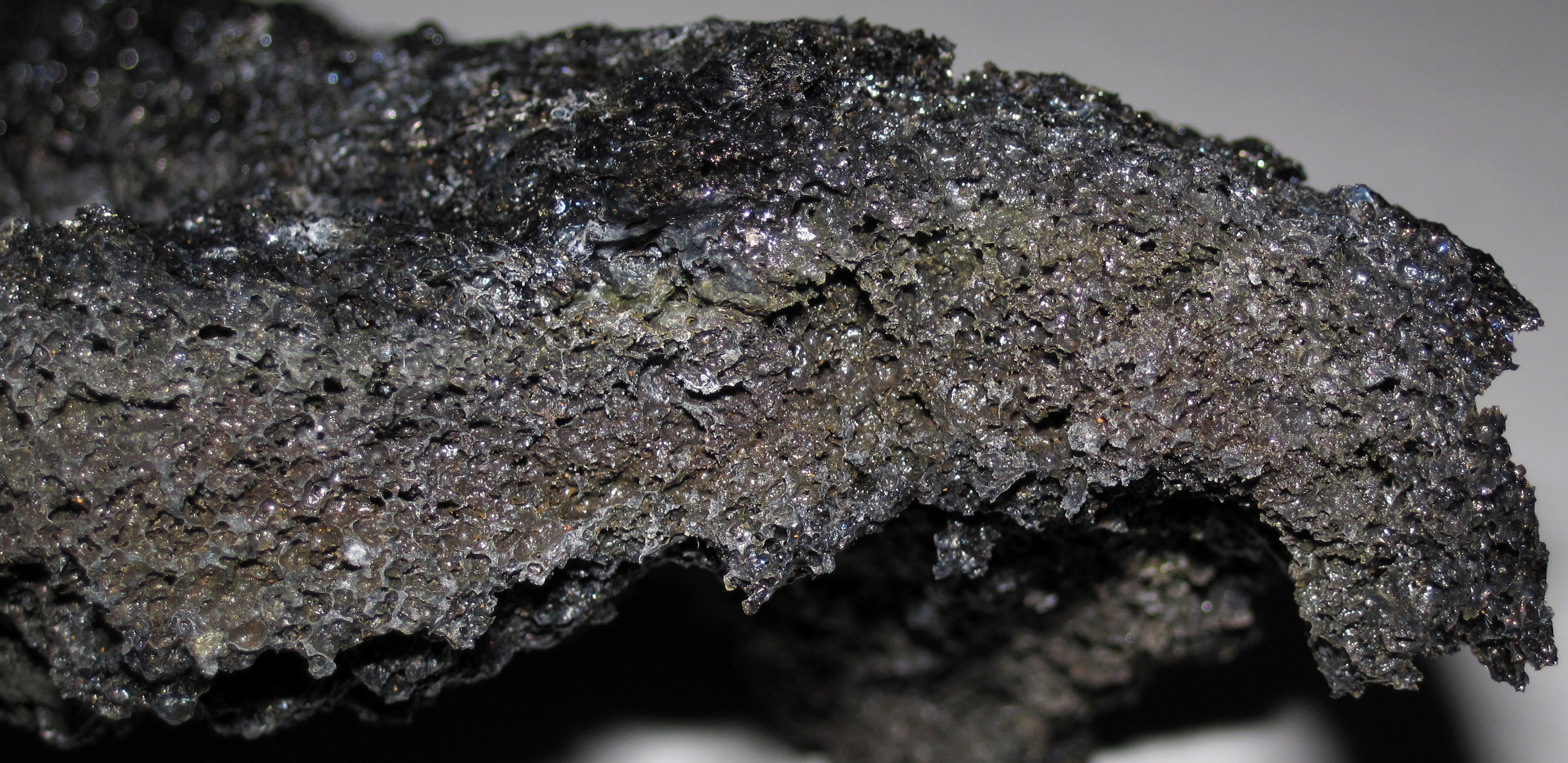

Results from measurements published by the University of Iceland on 26 April 2021 showed that the composition of eruption products had changed, to more closely resemble the typical Holocene basalts of Reykjanes peninsula. The full study of the lava sample sequence confirmed that at the start of the eruption shallowest mantle sources dominated the melt but over the next three weeks magma was sourced from a greater depth from a near-Moho reservoir and rapidly rose to the surface. While it was known that most mid-ocean ridge (MOR) basalts result from crustal reservoir melts this proved the suspicion that more rarely, mid-ocean ridge eruptions may be supplied from levels deeper than 7 km (4.3 mi), as the near real time lava sampling prevented later lavas confusing the time sequence of the change in composition. Mixing in the magma reservoir happened in a timescale of weeks, and it was replenished with new deeper melt within 20 days.

The eruption itself also changed in character at the same time, and was producing lava fountains up to 50 m (160 ft) in height on Sunday, 25 April 2021. On 28 April 2021, the lava fountains from the main crater reached a height of 250 m (820 ft).

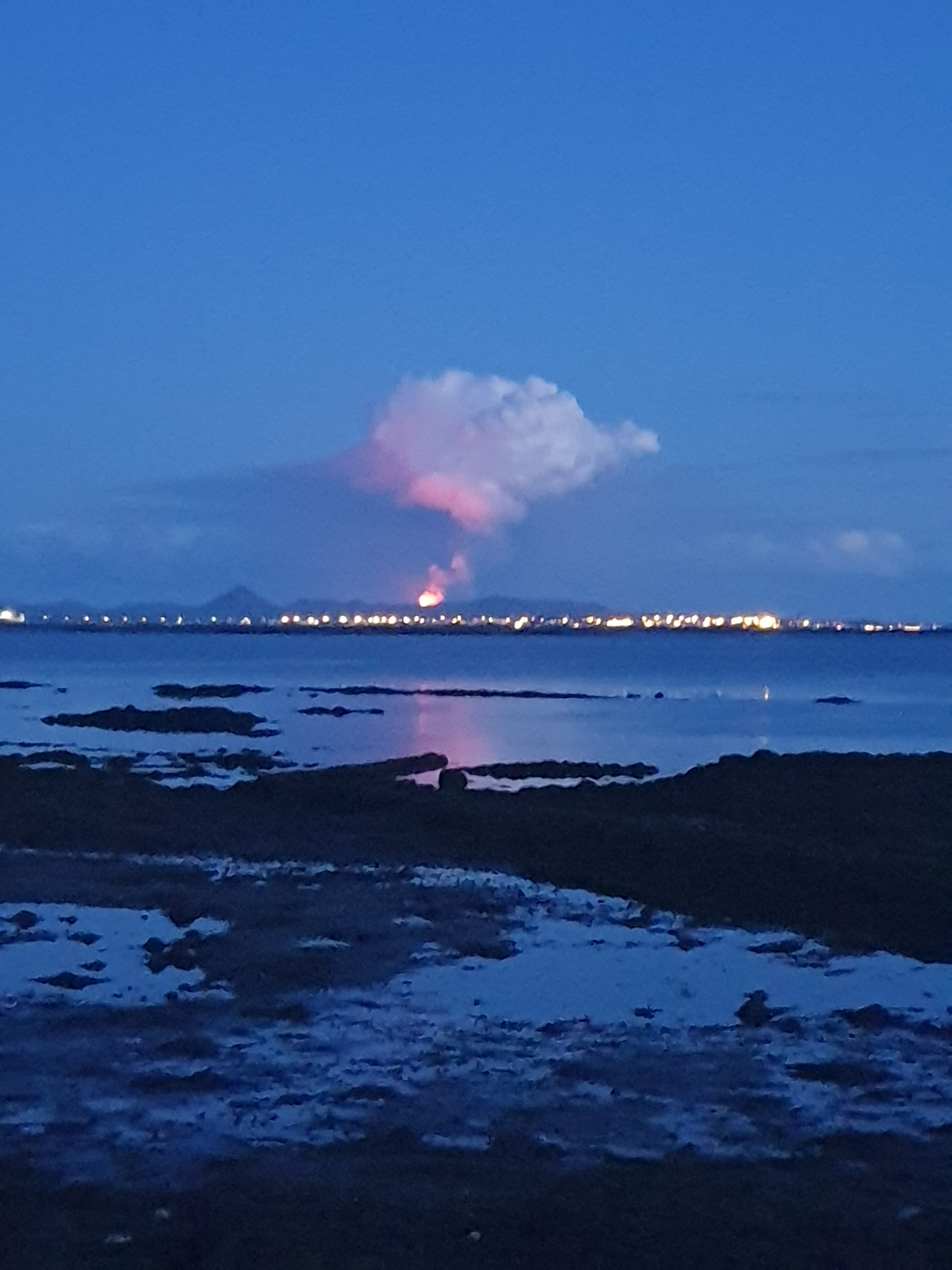
Lava fountains of the Fagradalsfjall eruption, seen from Reykjavík on 9 May 2021

The eruption pattern changed on 2 May from a continuous eruption and lava flow to a pulsating one, where periods of eruptions alternated with periods of inactivity, with each cycle lasting 10 minutes to half an hour. The magma jets became stronger, producing lava fountains of 300 m (980 ft) in height, visible from Reykjavík, with the highest one measured at 460 m (1,510 ft). The lava jets have been explained as explosive release of ancient trapped water or magma coming in contact with groundwater. The lava flow rate in the following weeks was also double that of the average for the first six weeks, with an average lava flow rate of 12.4 m^{3}/s (440 cu ft/s) from 18 May to 2 June.

The increase in lava flow is unusual, as eruption outputs typically decrease with time. Scientists from the University of Iceland hypothesize that there is a large magma reservoir deep under the volcano, not the typical smaller magma chamber associated with these kinds of eruptions that empty over a short time. From the composition of the magma sampled, they also believe that there is a discrete vent feeding the main lava flow from a depth of 17–20 kilometres (11–12 mi) from the Earth's mantle, and may be of a more primitive kind than those previously observed. The channel widened in the first six weeks leading to increased lava flow. The eruption may create a new shield volcano if it continues for long enough. The formation of such volcanoes has not been studied before in real time, and this eruption can offer insights into the working of the magmatic systems.

Two defensive barriers were created starting on 14 May as an experiment to stop lava flowing into the Nátthagi valley where telecommunication cables are buried, and further on to the southern coastal road Suðurlandsvegur. However, the lava soon flowed over the top of eastern barrier 22 May, and cascaded down to the Nátthagi. Lava flowed over the western barrier on 5 June. Lava flow blocked the main trail that provide access to the main viewing area on Gónhóll, first on 4 June, then again early in the morning of 13 June at another location. A further wall five meters high and 200 meters long was then created on 15 June in an attempt to divert lava flow away from Nátthagakriki ([ˈnauhtˌhaːɣaˌkʰrɪːcɪ]) with important infrastructure to its west and north. A barrier 3–5 m high started to be constructed on 25 June at the mouth of Nátthagi to delay the flow of the lava over the southern coastal road and properties on Ísólfsskáli [ˈiːsˌoul(f)sˌskauːlɪ], although it was expected that the lava would eventually flow over the area into the sea. A proposal to build a bridge over the road to allow the lava flow underneath was rejected.

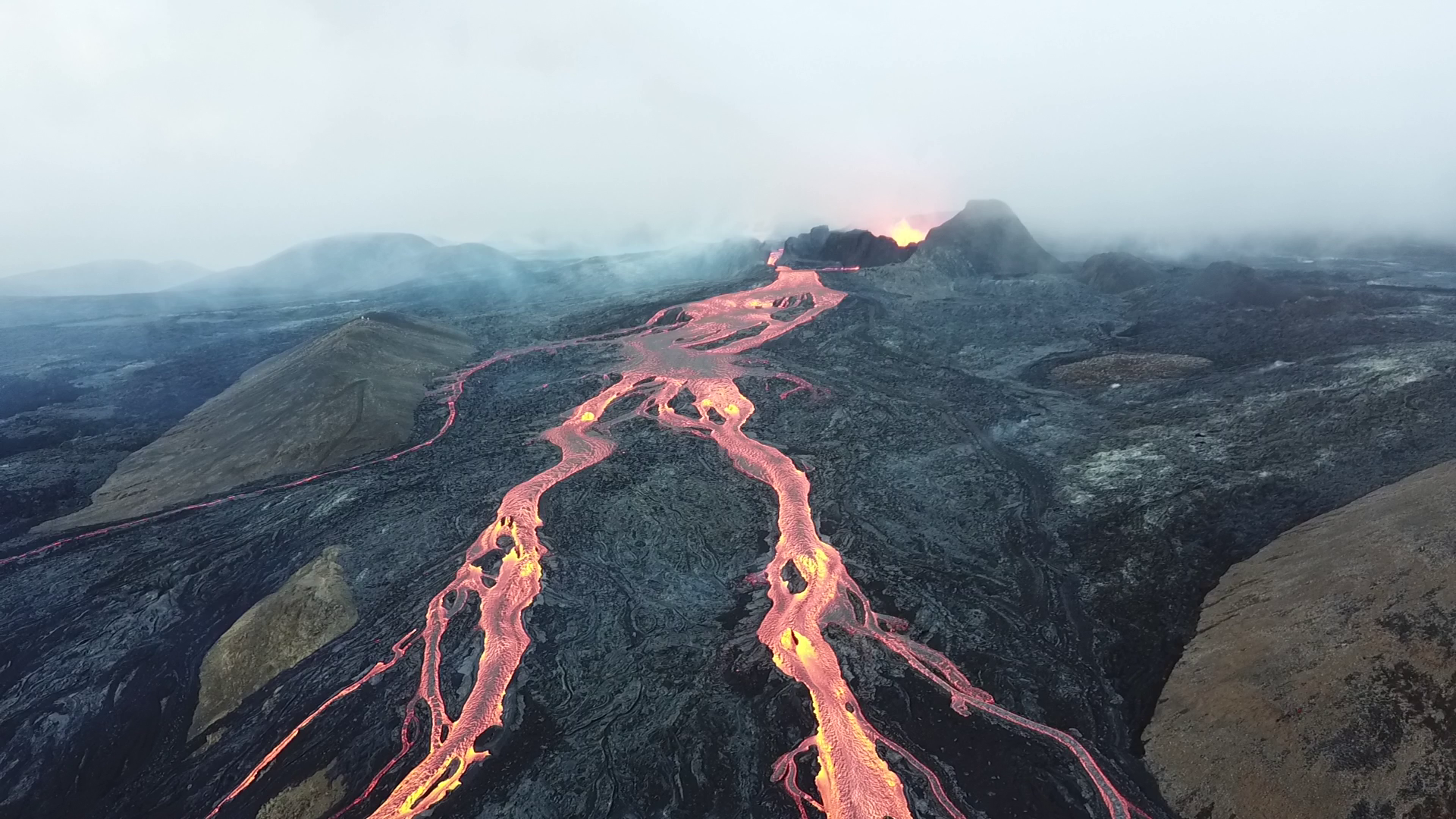
Fagradalsfjall eruption on 16 July 2021

Around three months after the volcano first erupted, the lava flow was a steady 12 m^{3}/s (420 cu ft/s), and the lava now covered an area of more than 3 km^{2} (1.2 sq mi) increasing by around 60,000 m^{2}/d (650,000 sq ft/d). Lava had accumulated 100 m (330 ft) deep around the volcano. The lava flow became continuous, which can be either above or below ground, although the eruptions also became calmer with the occasional increase in activity. There appeared to be no direct connection between the activity at the crater and lava flow. The lava flow was tracked by helicopter or satellite, for example via radar imaging that penetrated through the clouds and volcanic smog that had become more frequent in the area by July.

The eruptions stayed unusually constant until 23 June, and the activity then reduced significantly on 28 June, becoming inactive for many hours, and resuming on 29 June. It shifted to a pattern of many hours of inactivity, for example on 1 and 4 July, with the eruptions resuming later. Lava flow from the crater ceased for 4 days from 5 July until 9 July, when eruptions resumed, initially with a periodicity of around 10 to 15 minutes, then lengthening to 3 to 4 an hour by 13 July. Lava was also observed emerging from the bottom of the volcano on 10 July with considerable amount of lava flowing into the Meradalir valleys, and a section of the volcano on the northeastern side also broke off on 14 July. Lava flow was estimated to be around 10 m^{3}/s (350 cu ft/s) but averaged to 5 to 6 m^{3}/s (180 to 210 cu ft/s) due to the periods of inactivity from late June to mid-July, half of the flow rate in May and June. The periodic lull in activity continued, with 7 to 13 hours of inactivity and similar period of eruption by late July, which lengthened to a pattern of mostly around 15 hours of inactivity alternating with around 20 hours of continuous eruption in August. It has been speculated that there are blockages at the top hundred metres of the eruption channel. By July, this eruption had become larger than most eruptions that have ever occurred on the Reykjanes peninsula. Measurement taken on 27 July indicated that the lava flow had increased again, returned to and possibly exceeding the peak level last seen in June. The measurement indicated an average flow of 17–18 m^{3}/s (600–640 cu ft/s) over 8–10 days, the highest observed thus far, but with a large margin of error. After a couple of months where the lava flowed mainly into the Meradalir valleys, the lava started to flow down the Nátthagi valley again on 21 August. The eruption by now had become the second longest in Iceland of the 21st century.

The volcano stopped erupting on 2 September, but lava flow resumed on 11 September, with the magma breaking through the lava field surface in several places. However, the main crater channel appeared to have been blocked, and the crater was filled with lava from a source underneath the northwestern wall through a crack on the wall, and lava also flowed outside the volcano through the wall. The average lava flow over the past 32 days had returned to 8.5 m^{3}/s (300 cu ft/s), and the lava field of 143 million m^{3} (5.0 billion cu ft) now covered an area of 4.6 km^{2} (1.8 sq mi). After a period of continuous eruption, a pulsing pattern of activity last seen in April/May started on 13 September, a pattern believed to be similar to what is observed in geysers where the frequency of eruption may be determined by the size of the reservoir below and how quickly it is filled up. The volcano was pulsing at a rate of around eight eruptions per hour on 14 September. No lava flowed out directly from the crater, instead lava began to emerge in significant amount from outside the volcano on 15 September. On 16 September 2021, after 181 days of eruption, it became the longest eruption of the 21st century in Iceland. Average lava flow was 16 m^{3}/s (570 cu ft/s) from 11 to 17 September when flow resumed, with the lava field increasing to 151 million m^{3} (5.3 billion cu ft) covering an area of 4.8 km^{2} (1.9 sq mi). The eruption stopped again on 18 September, but the activity decreased unusually slowly. On 18 October, the alert level was lowered from "Orange" to "Yellow" due to no lava having erupted since 18 September. The Icelandic Meteorological Office also stated that "it is assessed that Krýsuvík volcano is currently in a non-eruptive state. The activity might escalate again, so the situation is monitored closely".

== 2022 eruption ==
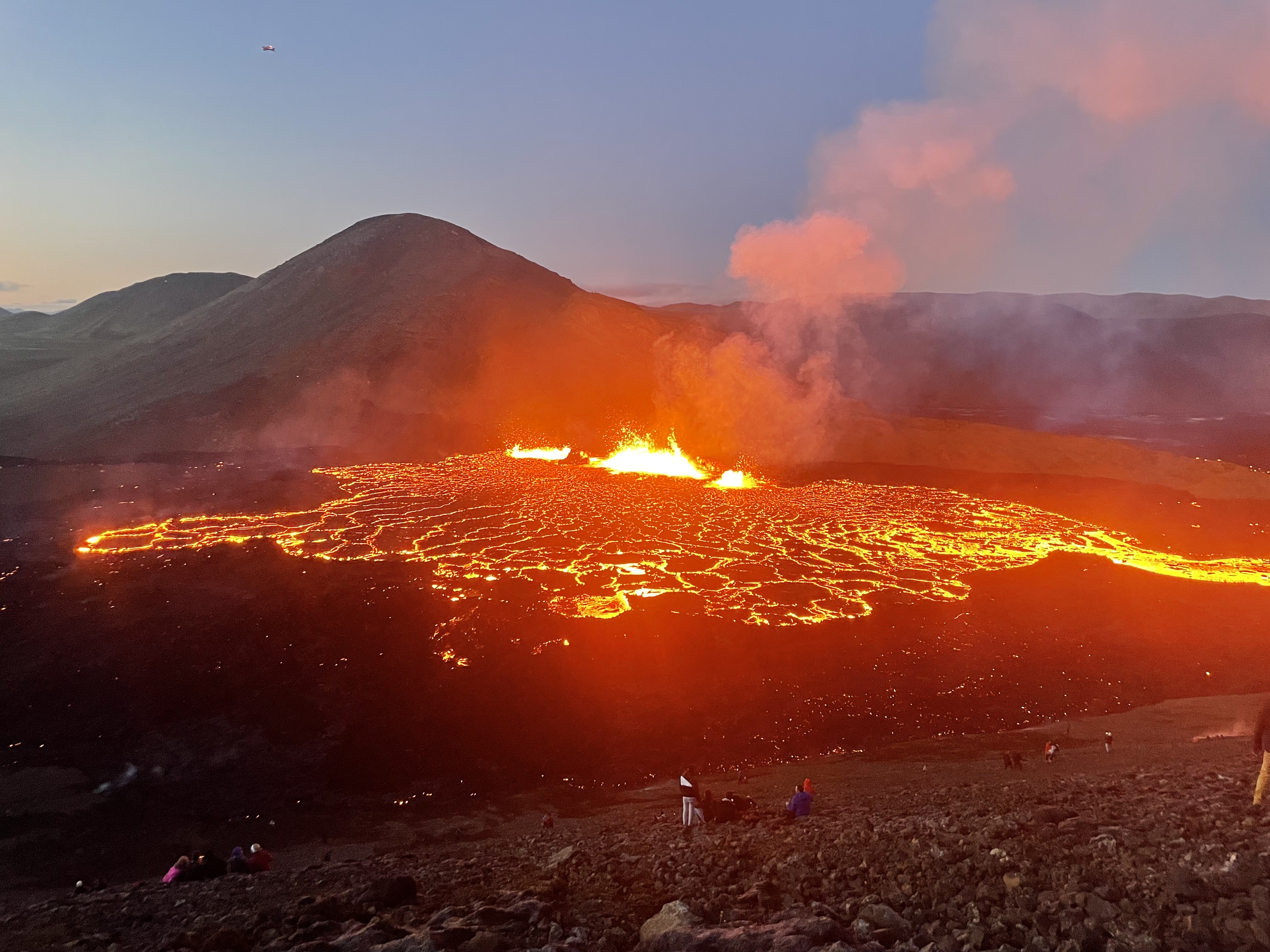
Eruption on 4 August 2022 of the Meradalir effusive eruption.

On 30 July, IMO reported an intense earthquake swarm in an area close to the lava field in Geldingadalur. On 31 July, almost 3,000 earthquakes were detected.

Earthquakes were reportedly felt in southwest Iceland, in Reykjanesbær, Grindavík, the Capital region, and as far as Borgarnes. Several of these earthquakes were above an M_{w} 3, with the largest event of an M_{w} 4 occurring at 1403. according to the Icelandic Meteorological Office's automatic location system; an M_{w} 5.4 event was detected at 1748. Deformation models indicated magma was around 1 km below the surface at 1749 on 2 August, according to IMO.

On 3 August 2022, after weeks of unrest on the Reykjanes Peninsula including over 10,000 recorded earthquakes from 30 July to 3 August with two quakes measuring over 5.0 M_{w}, another eruption began at Fagradalsfjall. A live stream from a camera at the site showed magma spewing from a narrow fissure vent. On 4 August the Icelandic Meteorological Office estimated it 360 m (1,180 ft) in length. Over 1,830 people visited the volcano on the first day. It erupted over a lava flow from the 2021 eruption. The Icelandic Meteorological Office initially advised people not to go near Fagradalsfjall due to the new eruption.

Lava flows were reported traveling downslope to the northwest. The flow rate was about 32 m^{3}/s (1,100 cu ft/s) during the initial hours of the eruption, which then decreased to an average of 18 m^{3}/s (640 cu ft/s) from 1700 on 3 August until 1100 on 4 August. By this time, about 1.6 million cubic meters of lava had covered an area of 0.14 km^{2} (0.054 sq mi).

Iceland's Department of Civil Protection and Emergency Management stated that no lives or infrastructure were currently at risk from the eruption. Iceland's main airport, Keflavík Airport, was briefly on alert, which is a standard procedure during eruptions, though the facility did not cancel any flights. Airplanes were prohibited from flying over the site, although some helicopters were sent in to survey the eruption. The eruption was not producing large plumes, though it was likely to affect air quality and pollution in immediately surrounding areas. Professor of geophysics Magnús Tumi Guðmundsson said, judging from the initial lava flow, that the eruption was likely five to ten times bigger than the 2021 eruption, but that it was not "the big one". From the nearby geomorphology, the lava was likely to flow into the Meradalir valleys.

According to a news article from RÚV, the length of the active fissure had decreased and the middle part of the fissure was the most active by 5 August. In addition, the number of daily earthquakes declined around the same day; strong gas-and-steam emissions were still visible. By 10 August lava was primarily erupting from a central cone and flowed east -southeast and northwest. IMO reported that lava was mostly flowing onto the 2021 lava flow field and was filling the eastern end of the Meradalir lava through at least 16 August.

There were three vents within the building cone that were visible on 10 August: the first is the largest and most centrally located vent, the second is to the left (east) of the central vent, and the third is the smallest one located to the right (west) of the central vent. Each of these vents erupted strong lava fountains rising tens to several tens of meters high during at least 10–13 August, then during 14–16 August the height of the lava fountains diminished. A smaller, secondary cone formed to the east of the main cone around 12 August. These vents fed into a large lava pond that traveled northwest of the breached vent and occasionally, lava breakouts would be noted along the ponded lava. Each day during 12–16 August the primary eruptive cone continued to grow, evolving to a perched lava pond that fed the lava flows to the northwest of it.

The lava flow decreased around 17 August and stopped on 21 August 2022. An estimated 12 million cubic meters of lava had erupted. The lava near the vent was 20–40 m thick, but flows were 5–15 m thick in the Meradalir valley, outside the crater area. Since then, there has been no visible activity at this site.

== 2023 eruptive activity ==
=== Litli-Hrútur eruption ===
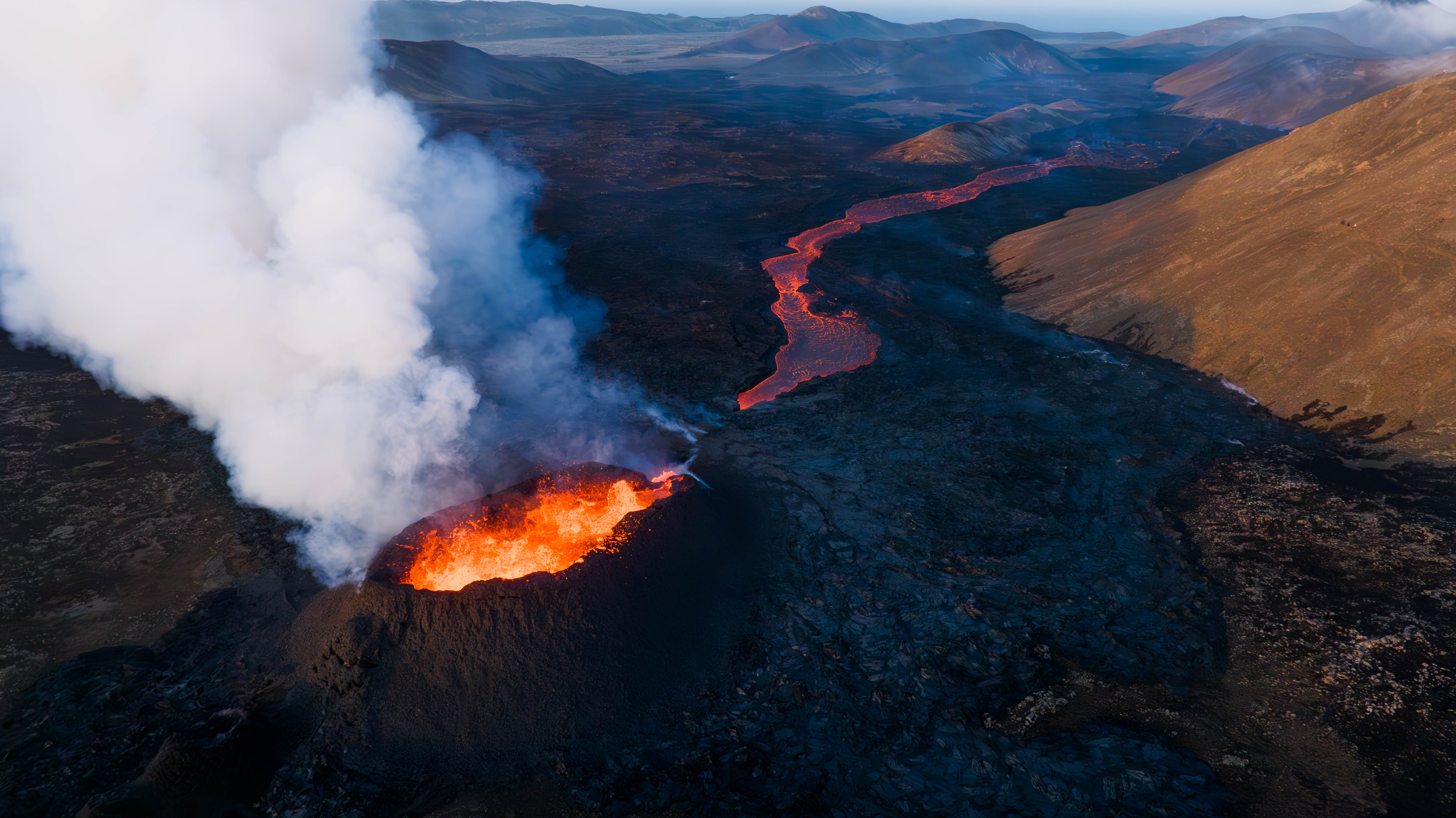
Litli-Hrútur eruption on 18 July 2023. The volcano is now an elongated cone, and lava flows south to meet the lava field of 2021 and 2022.

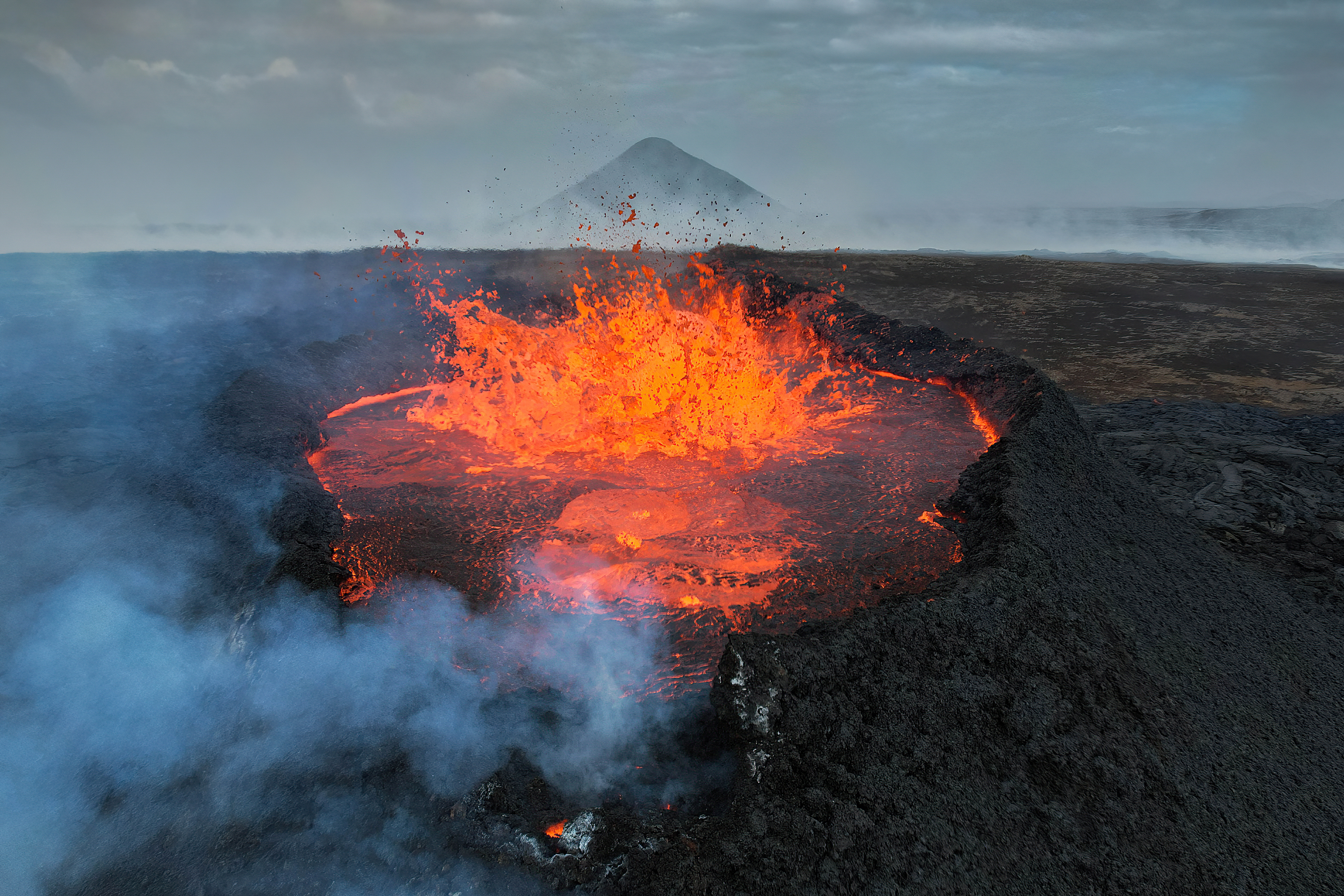
Close-up of the Litli-Hrútur eruption on 26 July 2023.

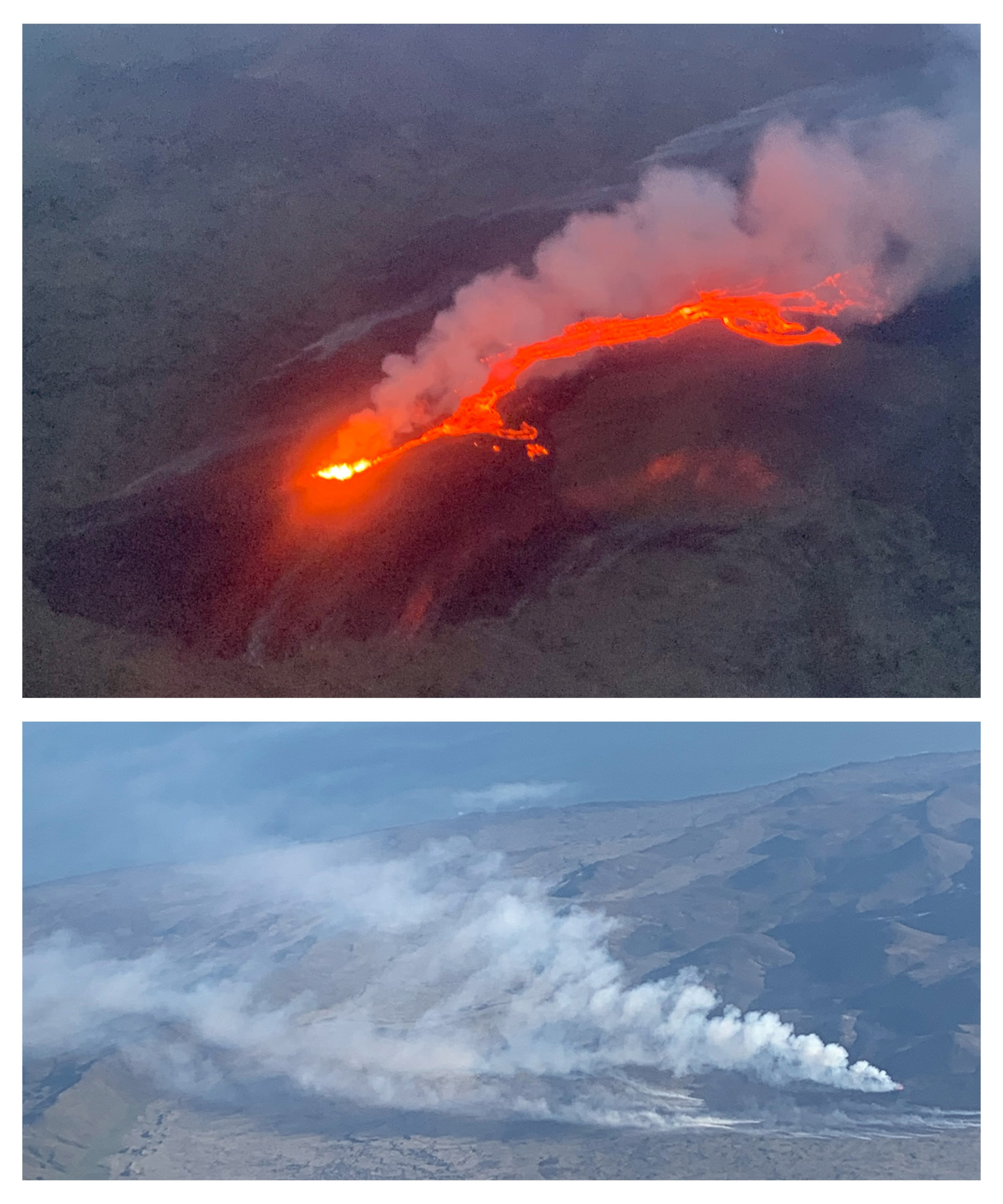
Litli-Hrútur eruption 2023. View from an airplane.

Seismic activity in the area increased greatly starting 4 July 2023 with over 12,000 earthquakes recorded, and following a 5.2 magnitude earthquake, lava broke through the surface on 10 July 2023 near Litli-Hrútur northeast of previous eruptions. This eruption was initially significantly stronger than the first two, with initial lava flow estimated to be 10 times more than the first eruption. Multiple eruptive fissures, originally 200 m (660 ft) in length, stretched for over 1 km (0.62 mi) between Fagradalsfjall and Keilir, significantly longer than the Meradalir eruptions. Flow of lava up to 50 m^{3} (1,800 cu ft) per second was reported in the first day, but dropped to an average of 13 m^{3} (460 cu ft) per second, the peak flow rate of the first eruption, within a few days. The eruptions quickly reduced to a single 200 m (660 ft) long fissure, which formed a single elongated active cone that increased in height by around 3 m (9.8 ft) a day.

The lava flowed in a southerly direction to meet the older lava field of Meradalir, but the lava caused significant wildfires in the area. Some lava flowed in different directions when the wall of the volcano collapsed on 19 July, but it then resumed flowing southwards. The crater rim has widened significantly, which increased the possibility of wall collapse, and another rim collapse happened on 24 July. Lava flow gradually fell with time, down to 8 m^{3} (280 cu ft) per second by 23 July, with most of the lava by then flowing to the east. Lava flow also reached a volume of 12.4 million m^{3} (440 million ft^{3}), greater in volume than the second eruption, covering an area of 1.2 km^{2} (0.46 sq mi). By 23 July, lava flow activity was occurring entirely beneath the surface. The lava since the beginning of the eruption has been determined to be similar to the lava from the end of the first eruption and the lava of the second eruption, indicating a link to the previous two eruptions.

The latest Icelandic Institute of Earth Sciences statistics revealed on 31 July indicate a notable reduction of the effusive eruption. The estimated lava flow discharge rate during 23–31 July was measured to be about 5 m^{3} (180 cu ft) per second. The previous values, detected between 18 and 23 July, signalized the discharge rate of the lava at about 9 m^{3} (320 cu ft) per second, which is nearly double the drop in the rate. As of 31 July, the outpouring lava has covered an area of 1.5 km^{2} (0.58 sq mi) with a volume of approximately 15.9 million m^{3} (560 million ft^{3}).

Lava flow reduced to 3–4 m^{3} (110–140 cu ft) per second by early August, suggesting that the eruption is approaching its end. With the reduced amount of lava in the crater, a smaller cone also formed within the crater. Volcanic activity at the site ceased on 5 August 2023. The eruption site proved very popular with tourists once more. An estimated 700,000 people have visited the area since the 2021 Fagradalsfjall eruption.

== Risk mitigation and tourism ==
Due to the volcanic site's proximity to the town of Grindavík, Vogar and to a lesser extent Keflavík, Keflavík International Airport and the Greater Reykjavík Area, Iceland's Department of Civil Protection and Emergency Management has created protocols for evacuation plans of nearby settlements and in case of gas pollution and/or lava flows. The large number of tourists visiting the eruption sites is also a concern to authorities, especially under-equipped tourists and those who do not heed official closures during inclement weather or new lava flows.

As of the second eruption in 2022, there is little risk of lava flows blocking roads or reaching settlements, but this could change if the Meradalir valleys fill with lava or another fissure opens up in a different area.

=== Air traffic ===
The eruption site is only around 20 km (12 mi) from Iceland's main international airport, Keflavík International Airport. Due to the eruption's effusive nature with little to no ash production, it is not considered a risk to air traffic. The ICAO Aviation Colour code has mostly stayed orange (ongoing eruption with low to no ash production). This has meant that no interruptions to flight traffic to and from Keflavík International Airport. Icelandic Coast Guard helicopters have conducted many research and monitoring flights around the volcano as well as large numbers of helicopter tour companies operating and landing in the vicinity, as well as small private aviation and sightseeing fixed wing aircraft circling the eruption site. Many unmanned drones are also active around the volcano site.

=== Roads and utilities ===
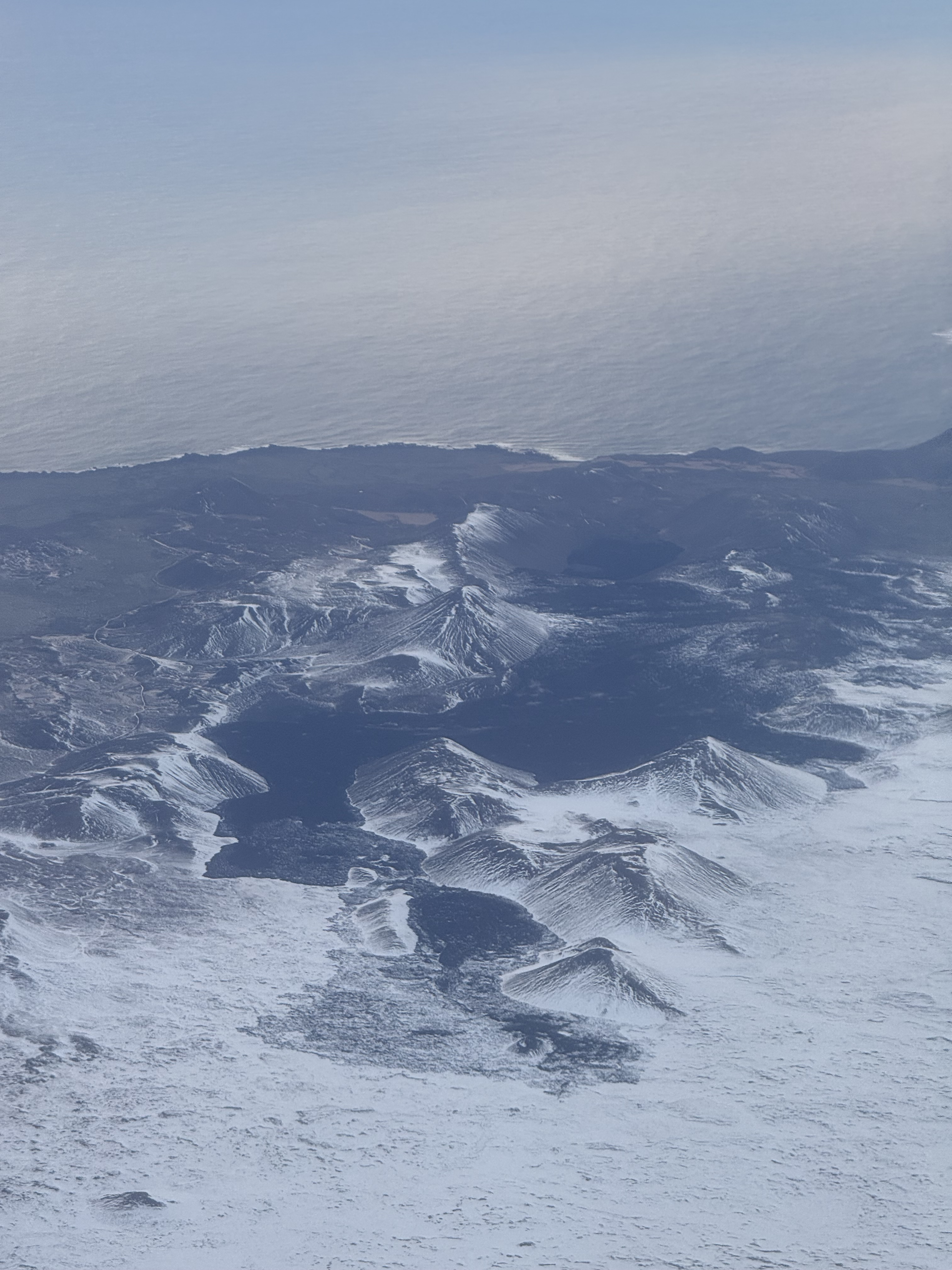
Aerial image of the Fagradalsfjall lava fields in December 2025.

The main concerns are if lava flows were to reach the main highway to Keflavík and the airport, Road 41, as well as the south coast road, Road 427, an important evacuation route for the town of Grindavík.

In addition, if the lava flows travel northwards, an important high-voltage transmission line to Keflavík is in danger of being cut off. Communications fiber routes both to the north and south side of the volcano are also in danger of being cut off, which could impact communications and the data center industry in Keflavík. However, the fissure's location as of August 2022 is unlikely to affect the roads and utilities.

Within a week of the start of the 2021 eruption, power and fiber-optic lines were laid from Grindavík to support operations of the authorities near the eruption site as well as 4G cell and TETRA masts were set up to ensure access to communications and emergency services (112) for tourists and authorities.

=== Lava flow experiments ===
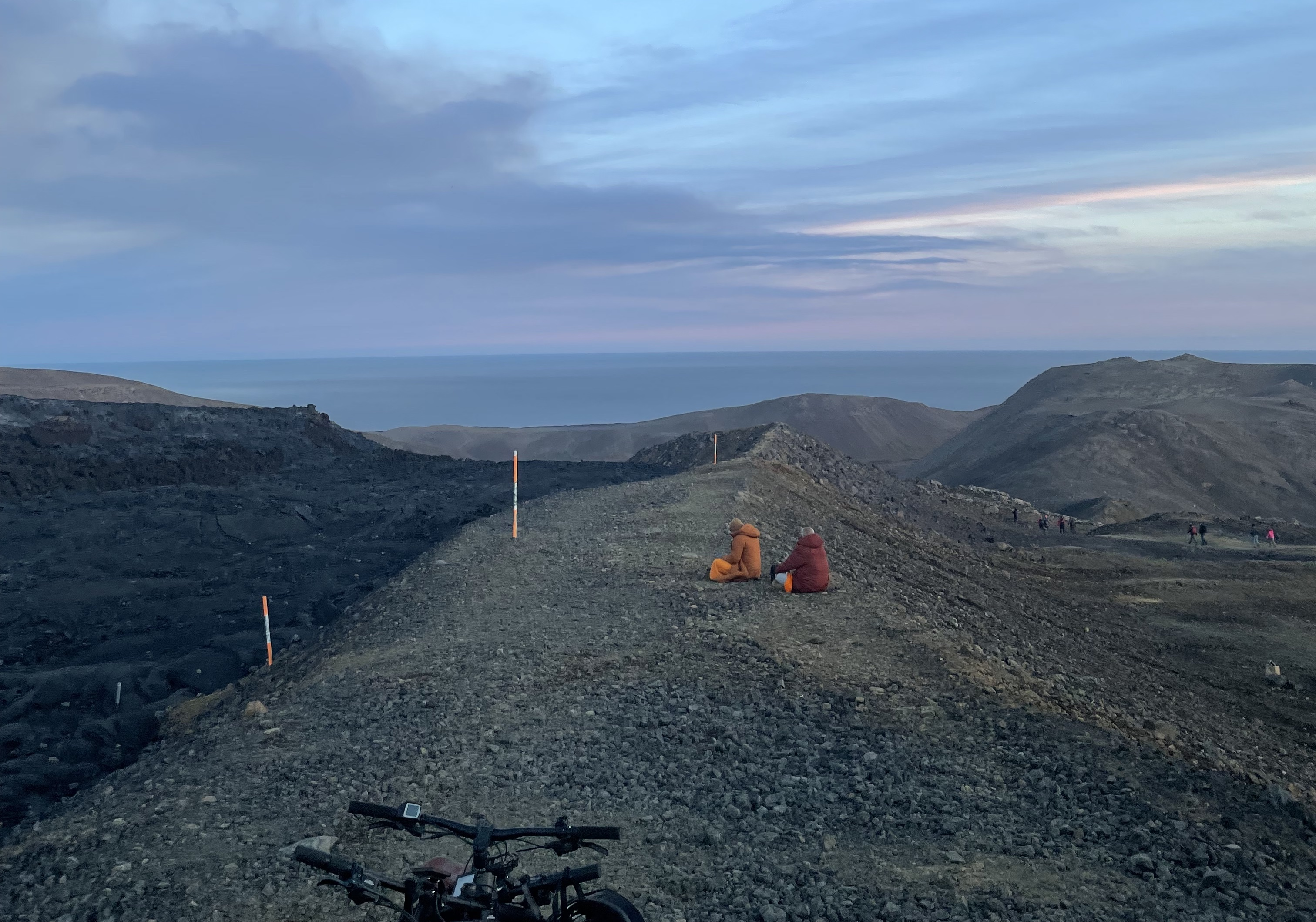
Lava levee constructed as an experiment in summer 2021 to control lava flows at the Fagradalsfjall volcano.

In July 2021, in collaboration with Iceland's Department of Civil Protection and Emergency Management, utility companies conducted an experiment by burying various types of utilities (underground electrical cables, fibers, water lines and sewage line) with varying levels of insulation in order to see how overland lava flows affect buried utilities. Another separate experiment was conducted by constructing large levees to control direction of lava flows; they were moderately effective in controlling slow moving lava flows.

In July 2023, during the Litli-Hrútur eruption, Icelandic electrical grid operator Landsnet constructed a dummy electricity pole and installed a high voltage underground electrical cable in the path of lava, as an experiment to study the lava flow's potential effects on the electricity network.

=== Tourism management ===
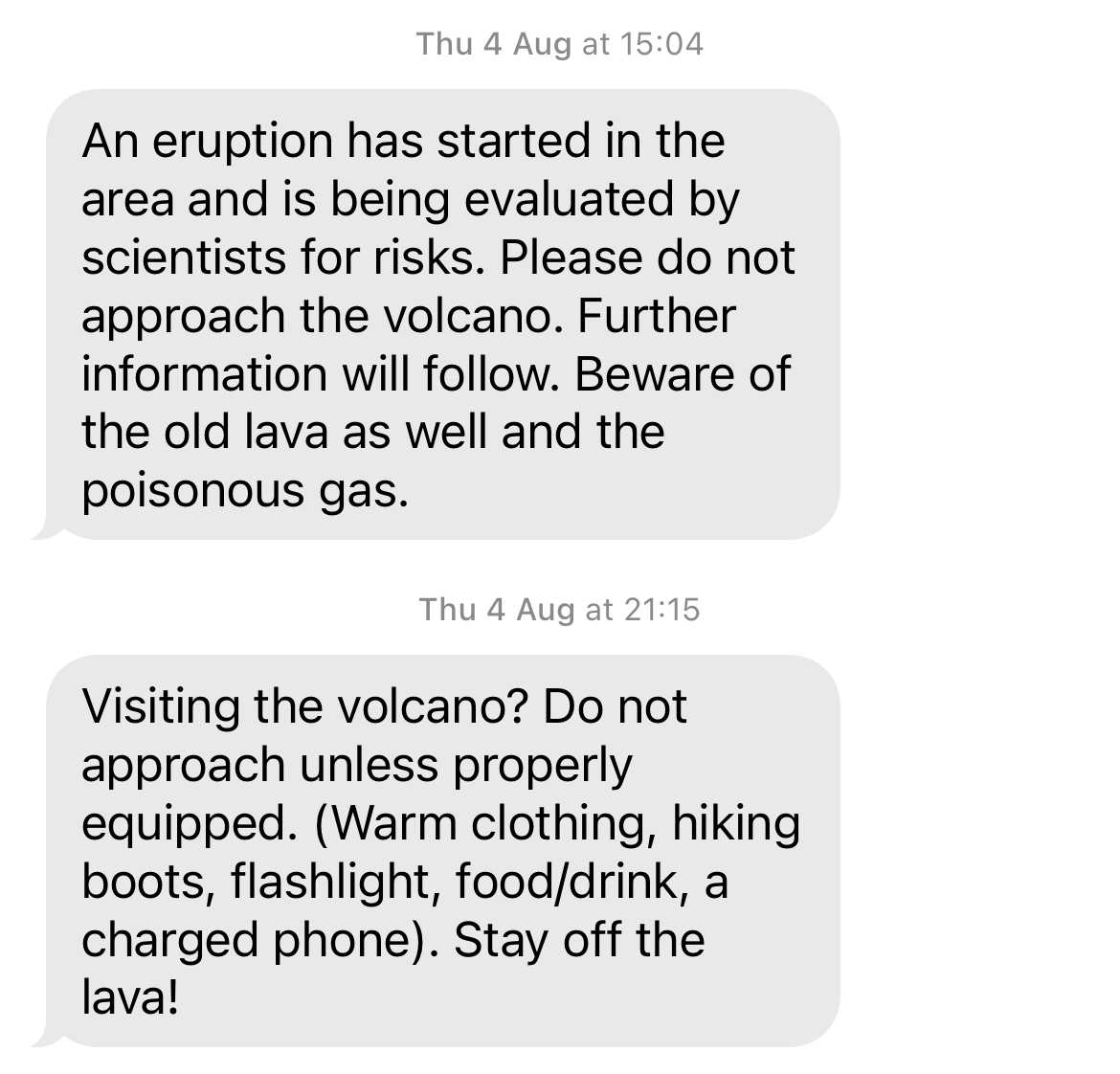
LB-SMS sent to mobile phones entering the vicinity of the volcano in August 2022.

The Fagradalsfjall volcano site is unusual in terms of its close proximity to Iceland's main international airport and popular tourist sites such as the Blue Lagoon. The site is only around 60 km (37 mi) from Reykjavík. Access is a short distance from Grindavík along paved Road 427, with limited parking available by the trailhead. Depending on the route taken, the hike to the new site is around 6–8 km (3.7–5.0 mi) each way, taking around 3–6 hours in hiking time (not including sightseeing or stops). Many parts of the route are extremely steep with uneven rocky ground, as well as being poorly signed due to the recency of the eruption. Depending on the wind direction, toxic gas pollution can be a risk as well as unpredictable lava flows and new fissures opening up.

Due to its easy access, a very large number of locals and tourists have visited the site. Around 10,000 people visited the 2022 eruption on its first day. Authorities have kept the site open for the most part, and try to inform rather than ban people from visiting the site. There have been no deaths reported as a result of the eruption, However, many injuries have been indirectly caused by the volcano, due to inadequately equipped tourists visiting the site with reports of broken ankles, lost travellers and hypothermia as weather is very unpredictable in the area.

Authorities have used location-based SMS messages to inform and warn tourists travelling to the site to be prepared. The site is manned during busy periods by the volunteers from the Icelandic Association for Search and Rescue, as well as local police. The site has had to be evacuated at least once due to fast moving lava flows. The site was closed for 2 days from 7 August 2022 due to inclement weather, however groups of tourists who did not heed the closures had to be rescued by the local volunteer search and rescue team, Þorbjörn.

During the 2023 Litli-Hrútur eruption, new challenges were faced in managing the tourism flow with more closures in place than previous eruptions. The 2023 eruption produced more volcanic gases as well as sparking some of Iceland's largest moss wildfires, creating much more dangerous respiratory risks for hikers. The 2023 eruption is also further away from main roads, making the hike more difficult (over 4–5 hours) and access for emergency services more challenging.

=== In Media ===
On March 24, 2021, lead singer of the Icelandic blues rock band Kaleo, Jökull Júlíusson, performed their song 'Skinny' on the volcano.

== Supposed burial site ==
The area where the volcano first erupted is thought to be the burial site of an early Norse settler, Ísólfur frá Ísólfsstöðum [ˈiːsˌoulvʏr frauː ˈiːsˌoul(f)sˌstœːðʏm]. However, a quick archaeological survey of Geldingadalur after the eruption started in 2021 found no evidence of human remains in the area.

== 1943 accident ==
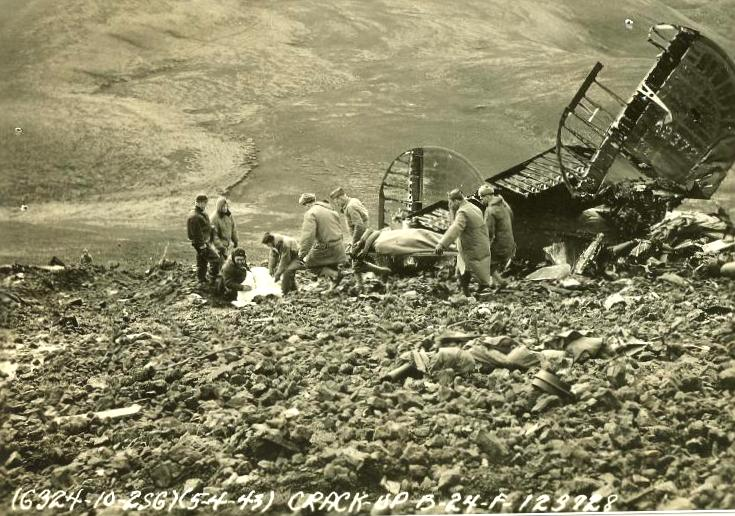
Recovery operation at the wreckage of Hot Stuff after the accident.

On 3 May 1943, LTG Frank Maxwell Andrews, a U.S. Army senior officer, founder of the United States Army Air Forces and a leading candidate for command of the Allied invasion of Europe, was killed along with 14 others when their B-24 aircraft Hot Stuff crashed into the side of the mountain.

== See also ==
- Geology of Reykjanes Peninsula
- Geography of Iceland
- Geology of Iceland
- Volcanism of Iceland
  - List of volcanic eruptions in Iceland
  - List of volcanoes in Iceland
