= Hot Stuff (aircraft) =

Aircraft used in World War II

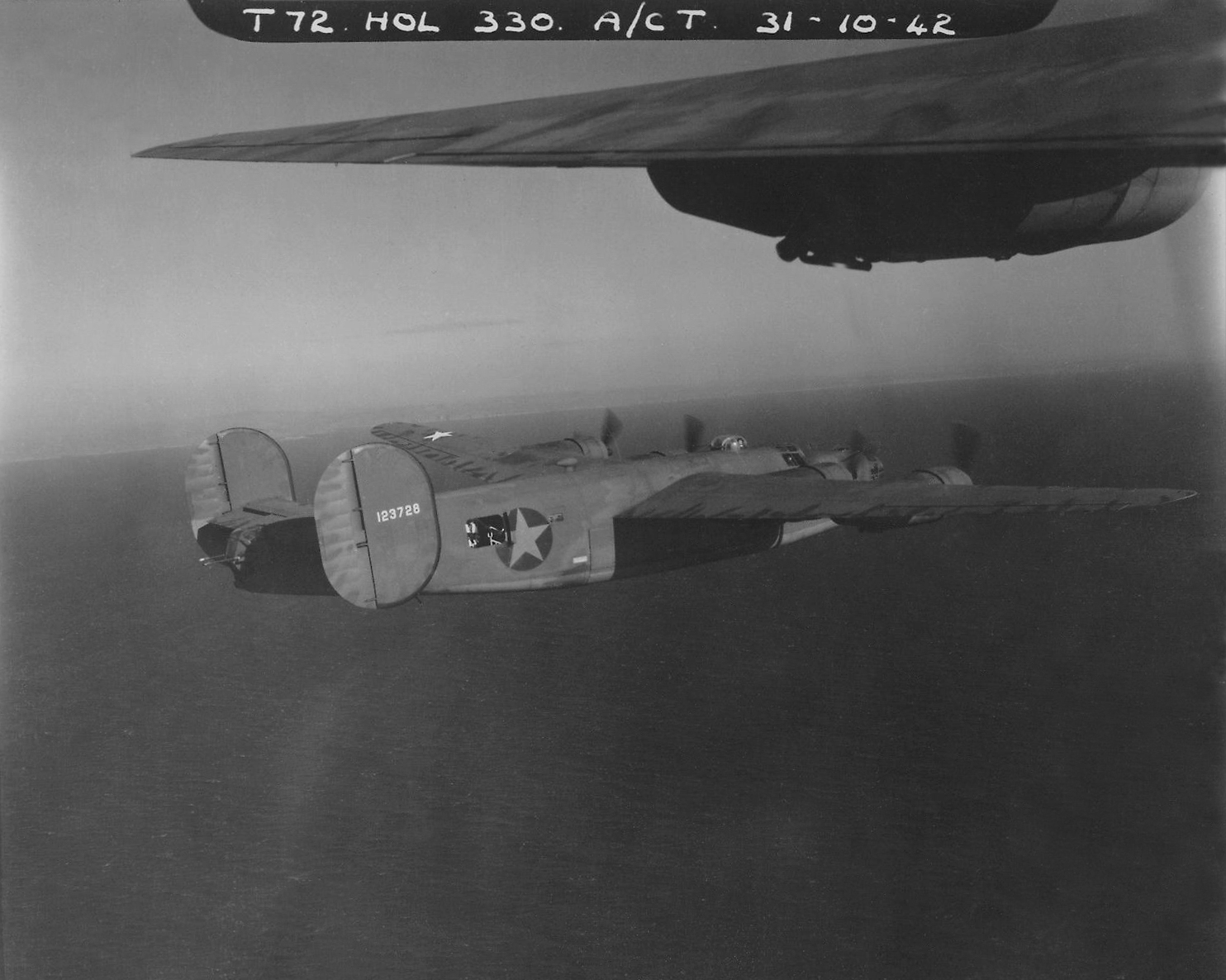
- B-24D Hot Stuff on its third mission, shown here over France in October 1942

General information
- Type: Consolidated B-24 Liberator
- Manufacturer: Consolidated Aircraft
- Owners: United States Army Air Forces
- Serial: 41-23728

History
- Fate: Crashed May 3, 1943

Hot Stuff is the name of a Consolidated B-24 Liberator, 41-23728, of the 8th Air Force that was used in World War II. It was the first heavy bomber in the 8th Air Force to complete twenty-five missions in Europe in World War II. It flew several more missions, and finally the crew was scheduled to return to the U.S. and help sell war bonds. The aircraft crashed due to bad weather in Fagradalsfjall, Iceland, on May 3, 1945, killing fourteen of those on board. It was flying to the U.S. carrying Lt. Gen. Frank M. Andrews and brigadier general Charles H. Barth Jr..

== Combat history ==
Hot Stuff was part of the 8th Air Force out of Hardwick (Station 104), England, and part of the 93rd Bomb Group, 330th Bomb Squadron. Hot Stuff flew its 25th mission on February 7, 1943, against long odds at a time when many planes were being shot down. Hot Stuff became the first heavy bomber and crew, and first B-24, in the 8th Air Force to complete twenty-five missions in Europe in World War II. It reached its 25th mission milestone three-and-a-half months before the widely celebrated Memphis Belle. After Hot Stuff completed thirty-one missions, it was selected to return to the United States on May 3, 1943, to tour the country and help sell war bonds.

== Crash in Iceland ==
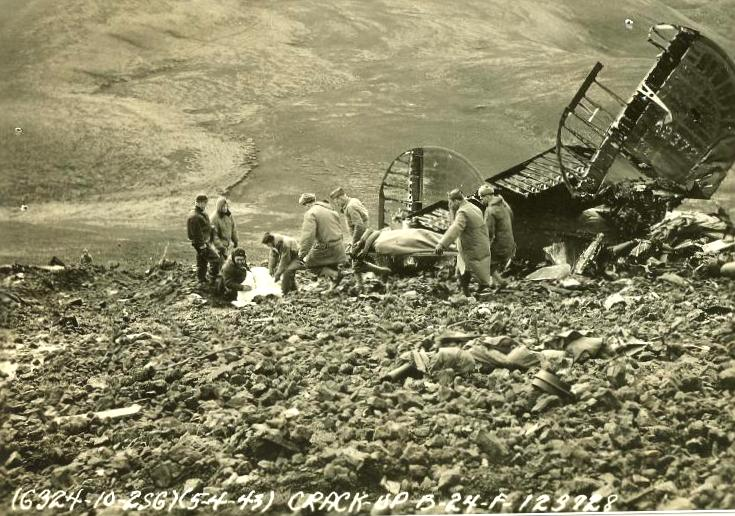
U.S. Army personnel remove bodies from the wreckage of Hot Stuff after it struck a mountainside in Iceland

In early 1943 Lt. Gen. Frank M. Andrews needed to get back to Washington, D.C. He was Commander of the European Theater of Operations and known as the father of the Air Force. General Andrews knew Hot Stuff's pilot Capt. "Shine" Shannon and chose to fly back to the United States with him. The pilot, Capt. Shannon, stated before the flight that he was "assigned to take Andrews home via Iceland." PFC Carroll Stewart, Gen. Andrews' aide and 93rd Bomb Group historian stated that "Captain Robert H. (Shine) Shannon of The Circus would have been going south, too, (to participate in Operation Tidal Wave, the Ploiești Raid) except his plane and crew were tabbed by Frank M. Andrews, gray-thatched European Theater Commander, for a hurried trip to the Pentagon." It was well known that General Andrews was in line for promotion and may have been going back to Washington, D.C., to be promoted to four star general and/or possibly assigned to lead the assault across the English Channel. Hot Stuff had a scheduled refueling stop in Iceland but crashed into Mount Fagradalsfjall near the town of Grindavík, in bad weather on May 3, 1943. Fourteen of those on board were killed, including Andrews, Brigadier general Charles H. Barth Jr. and bishop Adna Wright Leonard; only the tail gunner, George Eisel, survived.

Due to Andrews's death, the job of Supreme Allied Commander was assigned to General Dwight Eisenhower seven months later in December 1943. Additionally, because Hot Stuff was destroyed in the crash, the War Department chose to send the Memphis Belle home and celebrate it as the first bomber to reach 25 missions. Memphis Belle later inspired the making of two motion pictures: a 1944 documentary film, Memphis Belle: A Story of a Flying Fortress, and a 1990 Hollywood feature film, Memphis Belle.

A monument honoring the dead was unveiled near the crash site on 3 May 2018, 75 years after the crash.
