= List of U.S. general officers and flag officers killed in World War II =

This is a list of United States Armed Forces general officers and flag officers who were killed in World War II. The dates of death listed are from the attack on Pearl Harbor on 7 December 1941 to the surrender of Japan on 2 September 1945, when the United States was officially involved in World War II. Included are generals and admirals who were killed by friendly or hostile fire, suicide, or accidents (usually airplane crashes). General and flag officers who died of illness or natural causes are not included. The rank listed was at the time of their death.

In 1954, the United States Congress passed Public Law 83-508, which promoted lieutenant generals who had commanded an army or Army Ground Forces during World War II to the rank of general. When it took effect on 19 July 1954, Simon Bolivar Buckner Jr. and Lesley J. McNair were posthumously promoted. One officer was posthumously promoted to general officer rank during the war: Colonel William O. Darby, whose nomination for promotion to the rank of brigadier general had already been approved by Congress and submitted to President Harry S. Truman for approval at the time of his death. On the other hand, Douglas B. Netherwood was promoted to brigadier general in October 1940, but reverted to the rank of colonel on 25 December 1941. He died in an air crash on 19 August 1943.

== Lieutenant generals ==
Image	Name	Branch	Date of death	Cause of death	Location	Commands	References
	Frank Maxwell Andrews	United States Army Air Forces	3 May 1943	Airplane crash (accident)	Mount Fagradalsfjall, Iceland	Commanding General, European Theater of Operations, United States Army (ETOUSA)	
	Simon Bolivar Buckner Jr.	United States Army	18 June 1945	Hostile fire (artillery)	Okinawa, Japan	Commanding General, Tenth United States Army Posthumously promoted to general in 1954	
	Millard Harmon	United States Army Air Forces	26 February 1945	Airplane crash (accident)	Pacific Ocean near the Marshall Islands	Commanding General, Task Force 93 (Strategic Air Force, Pacific Ocean Areas) Commanding General, U.S. Army Air Forces, Pacific Ocean Areas (AAFPOA)	
	Lesley James McNair	United States Army	25 July 1944	Friendly fire (airstrike)	Saint-Lô, Normandy, France	Commanding General, Army Ground Forces Commanding General, First United States Army Group (fictitious/paper command) Posthumously promoted to general in 1954	

== Major generals ==
Image	Name	Branch	Date of death	Cause of death	Location	Commands	References
	Charles D. Barrett	United States Marine Corps	8 October 1943	Fall from a balcony (possibly suicide)	Noumea, New Caledonia	Commanding General, I Marine Amphibious Corps	
	Herbert Dargue	United States Army Air Forces	12 December 1941	Airplane crash (accident)	Near Sierra Nevada mountains in California	Was en route to relieve Lieutenant General Walter Short of duty after the attack on Pearl Harbor and was going to be Commanding General, Hawaiian Department	
	Stonewall Jackson	United States Army	13 October 1943	Airplane crash (accident)	Camp Polk, Louisiana	Commanding General, 84th Infantry Division	
	Frank Mahin	United States Army	24 July 1942	Airplane crash (accident)	Wayne County, Tennessee	Commanding General, 33rd Infantry Division	
	Paul Newgarden	United States Army	14 July 1944	Airplane crash (accident)	Chattanooga, Tennessee	Commanding General, 10th Armored Division	
	Edwin D. Patrick	United States Army	15 March 1945	Hostile fire (small arms)	Near Montalban (now. Rodriguez), Rizal, Luzon Island, Philippines	Commanding General, 6th Infantry Division	
	Maurice Rose	United States Army	30 March 1945	Hostile fire (small arms)	Near Paderborn, Germany	Commanding General, 3rd Armored Division	
	Clarence L. Tinker	United States Army Air Forces	7 June 1942	Airplane crash (hostile fire or accident)	Near Midway Island	Commanding General, Seventh Air Force	
	William P. Upshur	United States Marine Corps	21 July 1943	Airplane crash (accident)	Near Sitka, Alaska	Commanding General, Department of the Pacific, U.S. Marine Corps Medal of Honor recipient	

== Rear admirals ==
Image	Name	Branch	Date of death	Cause of death	Location	Commands	References
	Daniel J. Callaghan	United States Navy	13 November 1942	Hostile fire (naval gunfire)	Off Guadalcanal, British Solomon Islands	Commander, Task Group 67.4 during the Naval Battle of Guadalcanal Medal of Honor recipient	
	Charles P. Cecil	United States Navy	31 July 1944	Airplane crash (accident)	Near Funafuti, Tuvalu	Commander, unit of VII Amphibious Force	
	Theodore E. Chandler	United States Navy	7 January 1945	Hostile fire (kamikaze)	Lingayen Gulf, Philippines	Commander, Cruiser Division 4 during the invasion of Lingayen Gulf	
	Robert Henry English	United States Navy	21 January 1943	Airplane crash (accident)	Boonville, California	Commander, Submarine Force, Pacific Fleet	
	Isaac C. Kidd	United States Navy	7 December 1941	Hostile fire (aerial bomb)	Pearl Harbor, Hawaii	Commander, Battleship Division One during the attack on Pearl Harbor Medal of Honor recipient	
	Don Pardee Moon	United States Navy	3 August 1944	Suicide (gunshot)	Mediterranean Sea	Commander, Task Force 87 (Camel Force) for Operation Dragoon	
	Henry M. Mullinnix	United States Navy	24 November 1943	Hostile fire (torpedo)	Off Makin Island, Gilbert Islands	Commander, Carrier Division 24 and Task Group 52.3 during the Battle of Makin	
	Norman Scott	United States Navy	13 November 1942	Suspected friendly fire from USS San Francisco while fighting enemy ships (naval gunfire)	Off Guadalcanal, British Solomon Islands	Second-in-command, Task Group 67.4 during the Naval Battle of Guadalcanal Medal of Honor recipient	
	John W. Wilcox Jr.	United States Navy	27 March 1942	Swept overboard and lost at sea	North Atlantic Ocean	Commander, battleships, Atlantic Fleet	

== Brigadier generals ==
Image	Name	Branch	Date of death	Cause of death	Location	Commands	References
	James Roy Andersen	United States Army Air Forces	26 February 1945	Airplane crash (accident)	Pacific Ocean near the Marshall Islands	Chief of Staff to Lieutenant General Millard Harmon	
	Charles H. Barth Jr.	United States Army Air Forces	3 May 1943	Airplane crash (accident)	Mount Fagradalsfjall, Iceland	Chief of Staff to Lieutenant General Frank Maxwell Andrews	
	Gustav Joseph Braun	United States Army	17 March 1945	Hostile fire (anti-aircraft fire)	Near Monte Bel Monte, Italy	Assistant Commanding General, 34th Infantry Division	
	Frederick Walker Castle	United States Army Air Forces	24 December 1944	Hostile fire (anti-aircraft fire)	Near Hods, Belgium	Commanding General, 4th Combat Bombardment Wing Medal of Honor recipient	
	James Dalton II	United States Army	16 May 1945	Hostile fire (small arms)	Dalton Pass, Luzon, Philippines	Assistant Commanding General, 25th Infantry Division	
	Asa N. Duncan	United States Army Air Forces	17 November 1942	Airplane crash (accident)	Atlantic Ocean, en route from the United Kingdom to Gibraltar	Chief of Staff to Major General Carl Spaatz, commander of the Eighth Air Force	
	Claudius Miller Easley	United States Army	19 June 1945	Hostile fire (small arms)	Okinawa, Japan	Assistant Commanding General, 96th Infantry Division	
	Nathan Bedford Forrest III	United States Army Air Forces	13 June 1943	Hostile fire (anti-aircraft fire)	Kiel, Germany	Chief of Staff of the Second Air Force	
	Harold Huston George	United States Army Air Forces	29 April 1942	Airplane crash (accident)	Batchelor Field, Northern Territory, Australia	Deputy Chief of Staff for Material & Logistics (A-4), Far East Air Force	
	Davis Dunbar Graves	United States Army Air Forces	8 February 1944	Hostile fire (anti-aircraft fire)	Porto Santo Stefano, Italy	Commanding General, 63rd Fighter Wing	
	Charles L. Keerans	United States Army	11 July 1943	Missing in action (hostile fire or friendly fire)	Near Sicily, Italy	Assistant Commanding General, 82nd Airborne Division	
	Allan C. McBride	United States Army	9 May 1944	Starvation in a POW camp	Shirakawa Prison Camp, Formosa	Deputy Chief of Staff to General Douglas MacArthur Commanding General of the Service Command Area, Bataan	
	Don Pratt	United States Army	6 June 1944	Glider crash (accident)	Normandy, France	Assistant Commanding General, 101st Airborne Division	
	Howard Knox Ramey	United States Army Air Forces	26 March 1943	Missing in action (hostile fire or accident)	Torres Strait was the last confirmed location	Commanding General, V Bomber Command	
	Edmund Wilson Searby	United States Army	14 September 1944	Hostile fire (tank)	Épinal, Lorraine, France	Commanding General of Artillery, 80th Infantry Division	
	Kenneth Walker	United States Army Air Forces	5 January 1943	Hostile fire (anti-aircraft fire)	Rabaul, New Britain	Commanding General, V Bomber Command Medal of Honor recipient	
	Nelson Macy Walker	United States Army	10 July 1944	Hostile fire (small arms)	La Haye-du-Puits, Normandy, France	Assistant Commanding General, 8th Infantry Division	
	Carlyle Hilton Wash	United States Army Air Forces	26 January 1943	Airplane crash (accident)	Flomaton, Florida	Commanding General, II Air Support Command	
	James Edward Wharton	United States Army	12 August 1944	Hostile fire (small arms)	Sourdeval, Normandy, France	Commanding General, 28th Infantry Division	
	Russell Alger Wilson	United States Army Air Forces	6 March 1944	Hostile fire (anti-aircraft fire)	Berlin, Germany	Commanding General, 4th Bombardment Wing	

== Commodores ==
Image	Name	Branch	Date of death	Cause of death	Location	Commands	References
	James Alexander Logan	United States Navy	4 September 1943	Airplane crash (accident)	Maghera, Northern Ireland, United Kingdom	Commander, United States Naval Operating Base, Londonderry	

== Colonels ==
Image	Name	Branch	Date of death	Cause of death	Location	Commands	References
	William Orlando Darby	United States Army	30 April 1945	Hostile fire (artillery)	Torbole, Italy	Assistant Commanding General, 10th Mountain Division. Promoted posthumously to brigadier general on 15 May 1945, backdated to 30 April 1945	
	Douglas Blakeshaw Netherwood	United States Army Air Forces	19 August 1943	Airplane crash (accident)	Between Orlando Army Air Base, Florida, and Pope Field, North Carolina	Assigned to the Engineer School at Fort Belvoir, Virginia. Promoted to brigadier general in October 1940, but reverted to the rank of colonel on 25 December 1941	

== Brigadier generals of the Philippine Army ==
The Commonwealth of the Philippines was a U.S. territory during World War II, and Filipinos were United States nationals. The Philippine Army was created in 1935 to prepare the Philippines to become independent in 1946 with its own independent military. Many U.S. military officers became officers in the new Philippine Army, the most famous amongst them being Field Marshal of the Philippine Army Douglas MacArthur. Because the Philippines was a part of the United States and the Philippine Army was, on President Franklin D. Roosevelt's orders, part of the United States Army Forces in the Far East and later part of the U.S. military in the South West Pacific Area, four Philippine Army general officers (all of whom held the rank of brigadier general) who were killed during World War II are listed here. Two Filipino graduates of West Point, Vicente Lim and Fidel Segundo, were killed in action during World War II while serving as generals for the Philippines and the United States. All served in the United States Army during their careers before being promoted to brigadier general in the Philippine Army.

Image	Name	Branch	Date of death	Cause of death	Location	Commands	References
	Simeon de Jesus	Philippine Army	31 December 1944	Executed by Japanese forces	Manila, Philippines	Chief of Intelligence (G-2), Military Intelligence Service, U.S. Army Forces in the Far East	
	Guy Fort	Philippine Army	11 November 1942	Executed by Japanese forces	Marawi, Mindanao, Philippines	Commanding General, 81st Infantry Division (Philippines), U.S. Army Forces in the Far East	
	Vicente Lim	Philippine Army	31 December 1944	Executed by Japanese forces	Manila, Philippines	Commanding General, 41st Infantry Division (Philippines), U.S. Army Forces in the Far East	
	Fidel Segundo	Philippine Army	6 January 1945	Executed by Japanese forces	Manila, Philippines	Commanding General, 1st Regular Division (Philippines), U.S. Army Forces in the Far East	
