= Operation Causeway =

Planned Allied invasion of Taiwan, Kinmen, and Xiamen in World War II

- Part of the Pacific War
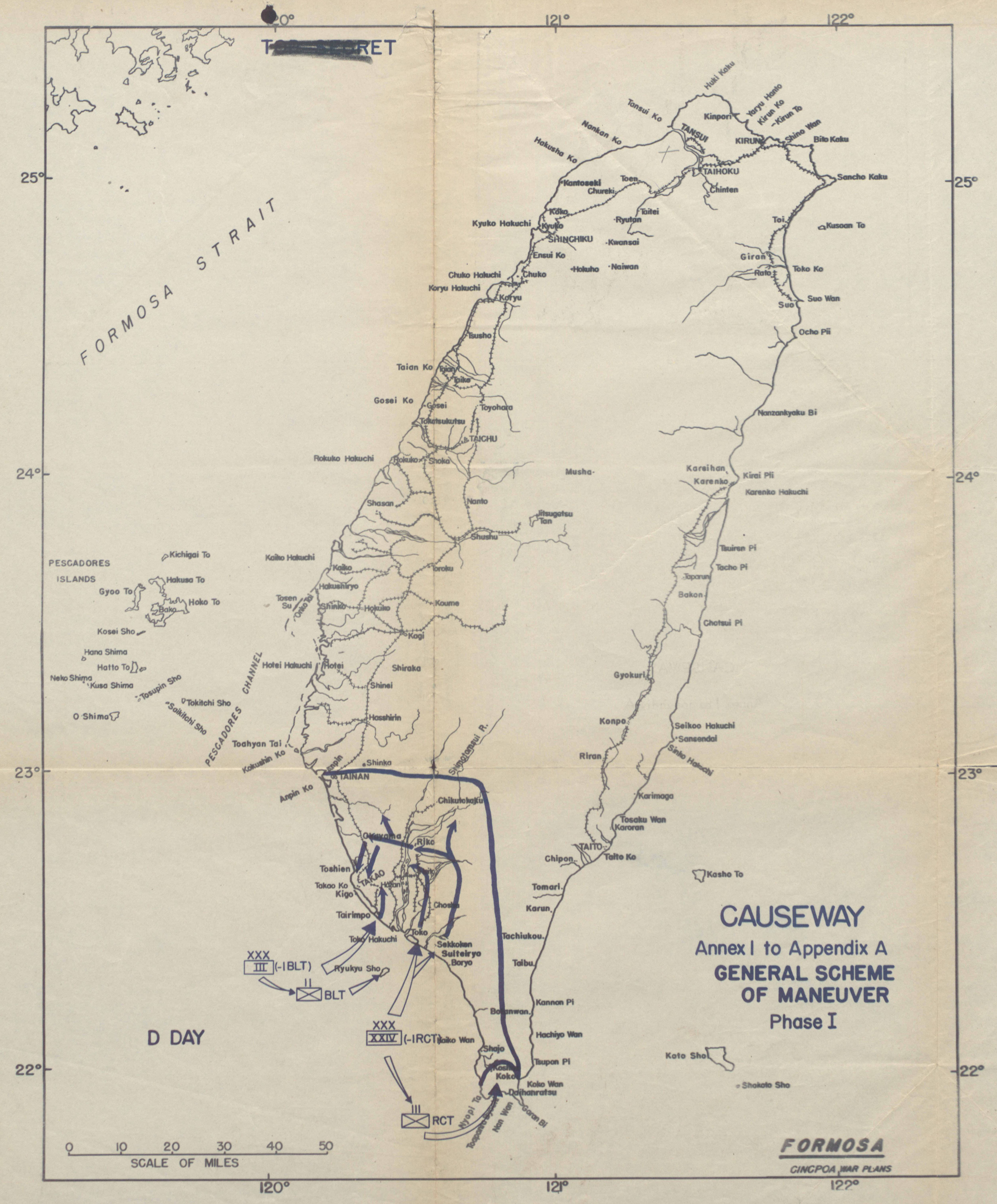
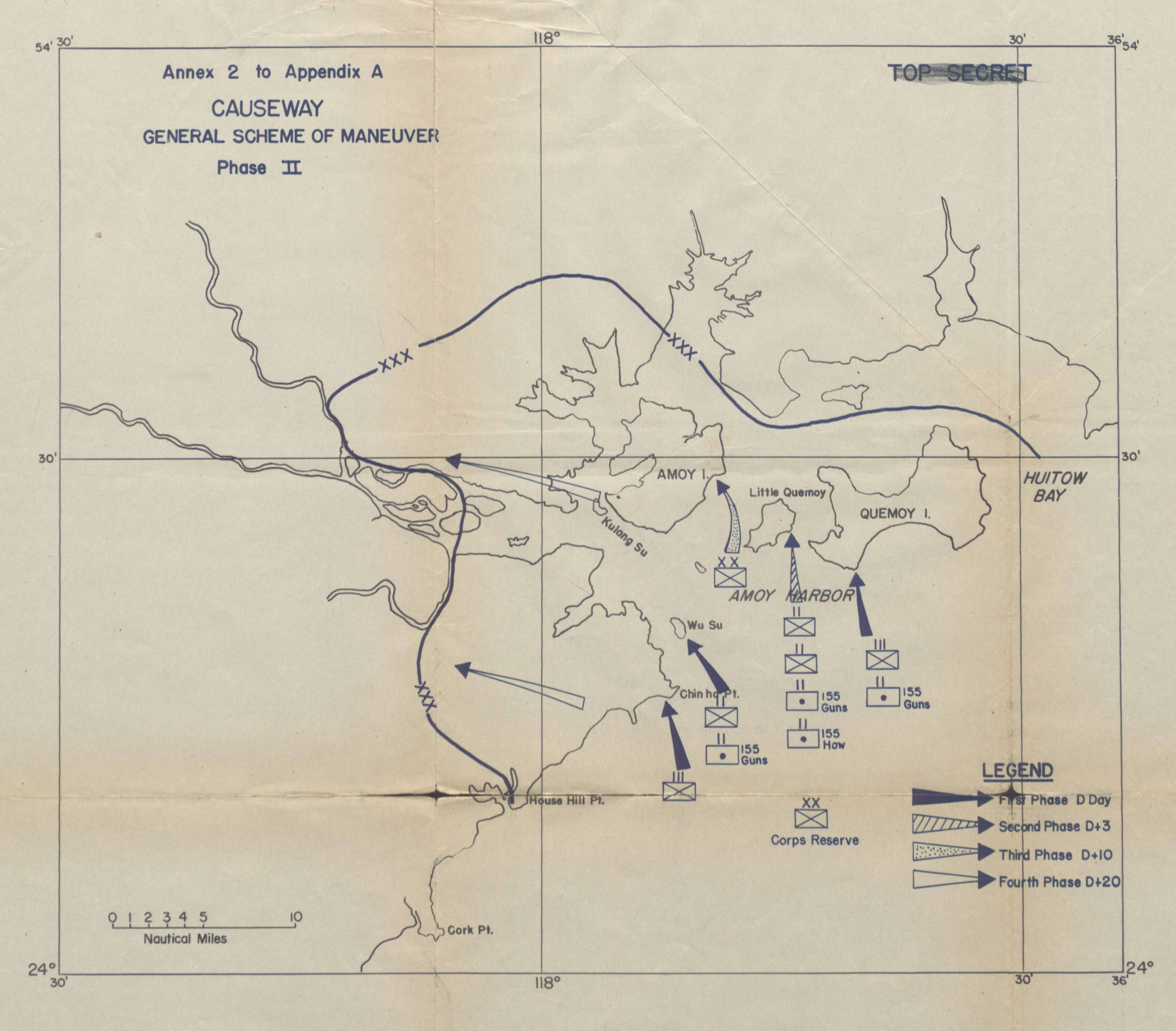
- American maps showing the general scheme of maneuver for Operation Causeway; Phase 1: the invasion of Taiwan (left); Phase 2: the invasion of Kinmen and Xiamen (right)
- Location: Taiwan, Kinmen, and Xiamen
- Planned: March–October 1944
- Planned by: Chester Nimitz; Simon Bolivar Buckner Jr.; Joint Strategic Survey Committee
- Commanded by: Simon Bolivar Buckner Jr.
- Objective: Control the Taiwan Strait
- Date: Planned Formosa D-Day: February–March 1945; Planned Xiamen and Kinmen invasion date: c. 20 days after D-Day
- Executed by: Tenth Army
- Outcome: Operation aborted in favor of the invasions of the Philippines, Iwo Jima and Okinawa

Operation Causeway was a planned United States invasion of Formosa (Taiwan), the Quemoys (Kinmen Islands), and Xiamen Bay on the southeastern coast of Mainland China during World War II. At that time, Formosa was a Japanese colony since the nineteenth century. The island was seen as a possible next step in the planned Allied "island-hopping" advance across the Pacific after the capture of the Marianas in mid-1944.

The objectives of Operation Causeway included securing control over the Taiwan Strait to establish a forward base for the strategic bombing and final invasion of Japan, while simultaneously linking Nationalist Chinese forces with an unbroken seaborne supply line to America's vast military-industrial complex.

== Background ==
The Joint Strategic Survey Committee (JSSC) of the Joint Chiefs of Staff along with the U.S. Navy, favored the Central Pacific (Marianas, Micronesia, and Carolines)-Taiwan route as the most direct and strategically advantageous path to Japan. This was in opposition to General Douglas MacArthur's favored South Pacific-Philippines route. Planners of Operation Causeway argued that Taiwan would have provided a suitable base for the strategic bombing campaign against Japan as well as a staging area for the foreseen invasion of the Japanese home islands. The capture of Xiamen (Amoy) Bay would replace the poor overland and air supply routes through India and Burma to China.

The JSSC believed that capturing the south China coast, Taiwan, and Luzon strategic triangle would give the Allies control over the South China Sea, severing Japan's connection to the south. They further envisioned China as a vital ally against Japan, serving as a base for bombing raids against Japan and a source of infantry manpower to destroy Japanese forces in Asia. This China-centric strategic outlook generated support in Washington for the Central Pacific-Taiwan line of attack. Taiwan's planned capture was also seen as a demonstration of American support for the continued participation of China in the war against Japan.

In March 1944, the Joint Chiefs of Staff announced a new concept of operations "orientated toward the capture of Formosa" scheduled after the Mariana and Palau Islands campaign. The operational planning was assigned to Admiral Chester W. Nimitz, Commander-in-Chief of the Pacific Fleet, and his subordinates. General MacArthur, commander-in-chief of the South West Pacific Area, was tasked with planning for the recapture of Luzon, should its recapture be "necessary prior to the move on Formosa."

== Planning ==
=== Causeway in detail ===
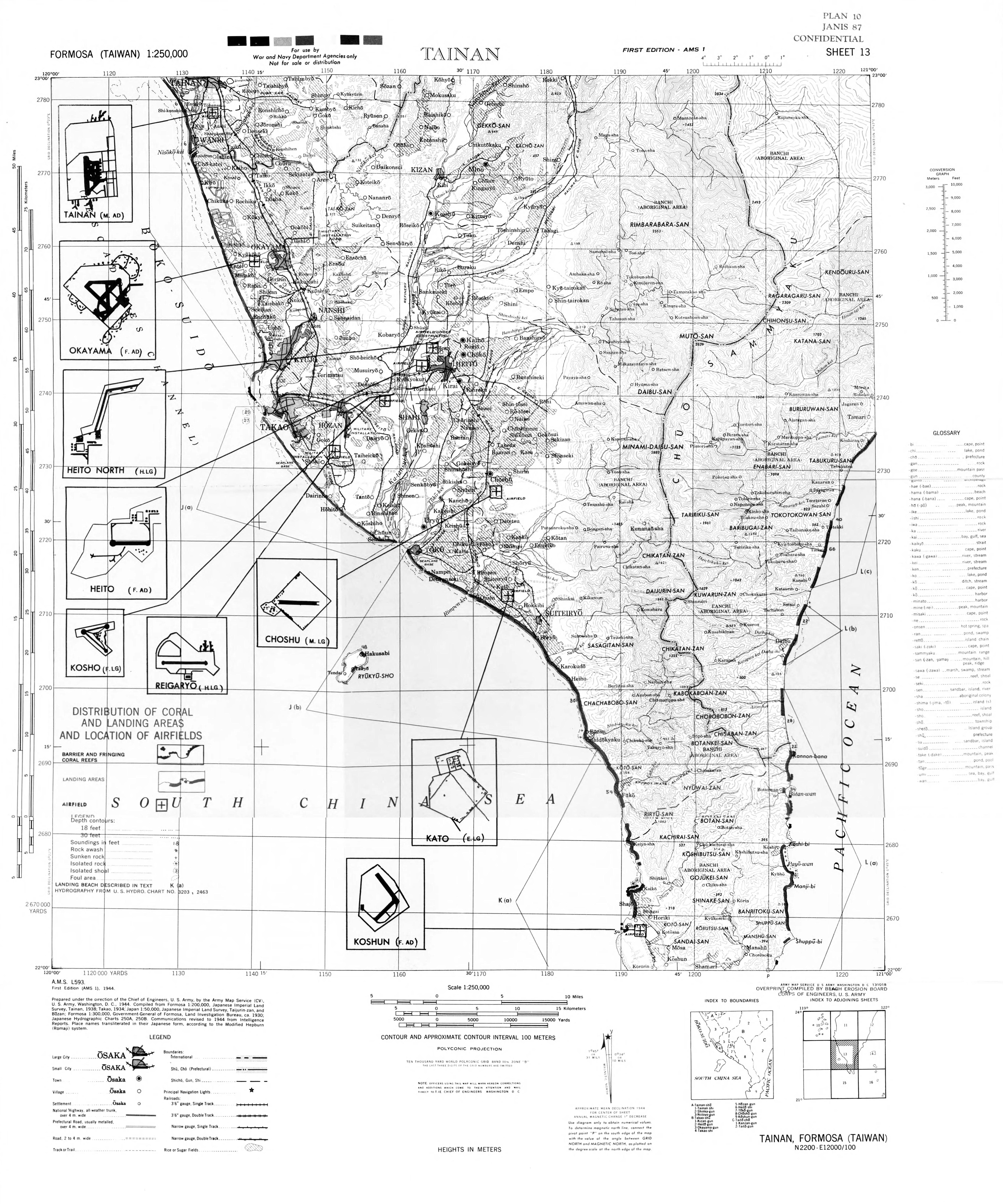
Map of landing beaches and airfields in southwestern Taiwan, June 1944

According to the most complete plans, on February 15, 1945, the tentative D-Day for Operation Causeway, six U.S. Army and Marine Corps divisions of Tenth Army, commanded by General Simon Bolivar Buckner Jr., were to launch an amphibious assault on the beaches of southwestern Taiwan, before capturing the strategic ports of Kaohsiung (Takao), Taiwan’s largest harbor, and Zuoying. Following the landings, American forces would advance northward, securing the city of Tainan and establishing a defensive perimeter along the Zengwen River. After neutralizing any remaining Japanese resistance within the sector, American forces would continue up the western coastal plain, expanding the Allied foothold as far as logistical and tactical conditions permitted.

General Buckner determined that after the initial phase, securing all of Taiwan would ultimately be necessary. He prepared two invasion plans: one adhering to the 'limited objective concept' assigned to him by Admiral Nimitz, which focused on southern Taiwan, and another pursuing a 'broader concept' to occupy the entire island. The latter plan envisioned an armored thrust up the western coastal plain to destroy major Japanese garrisons in Keelung and Taipei. A surprise amphibious landing at Taichung, or the Hsinchu/Taoyuan area in northwest Taiwan, possibly supported by airborne operations, would outflank Japanese units entrenched in southern and central Taiwan.

In the second phase of Causeway, the V Amphibious Corps under General Harry Schmidt, composed of three Marine divisions, was to cross the Taiwan Strait to seize the Kinmen Islands (Quemoys) and Xiamen Bay in mainland China approximately 20 days after the first landings on Taiwan. The city of Xiamen (Amoy) had been seized by a Japanese naval landing force in 1938, along with several other major ports in South China, as part of a broader effort to blockade mainland China. However, these Japanese-held positions were relatively isolated and not connected to the main body of Japanese-occupied territories further north. After securing the islands, the Marines would push approximately 20 miles into Mainland China, destroying a critical Japanese pocket in coastal China and linking up with Chiang Kai-shek’s National Revolutionary Army. Admiral Nimitz intended for the Penghu Islands (Pescadores) to be bypassed and neutralized unless developments favored an invasion of the Penghus over Xiamen Bay.

Following Causeway, Naval Construction Battalions (Seabees) would rapidly develop Xiamen Bay into a massive anchorage capable of supporting the entire U.S. Pacific Fleet. For the first time, American and Chinese forces would establish a secure, direct seaborne supply line, connecting China with the American war machine. Vast quantities of fuel, ammunition, and war matériel would then flow into China, significantly bolstering Chiang's massive but poorly supplied armies. Air bases of the China-based Fourteenth Air Force would be further developed. By September 1945, with the typhoon season concluded, U.S. forces planned to be firmly established in the Taiwan Strait, positioning them for the anticipated final invasion of Japan.

=== Logistical challenges ===
By late August 1944, the Causeway plan had ballooned in scope, with each new draft requiring more troops as commanders concluded that they would likely need to conquer and garrison the entire island of Taiwan. Given the island’s rugged terrain and a population potentially loyal to Japan, the operation promised to be long and costly. On August 18, Admiral Nimitz estimated it would require 505,000 Army troops, 154,000 Marines, and 61,000 Navy shore personnel, numbers comparable to the Normandy invasion. Meeting such a manpower demand was increasingly unrealistic, as U.S. ground forces remained engaged in Europe. Naval and landing forces would also need to cross 1,000 miles of open ocean from the Marianas, further straining logistics.

Operation Causeway's main barriers were insufficient troops and logistical support, compounded by the sudden influx of heavy Japanese reinforcements on Taiwan, which greatly raised expected costs. General LeRoy Lutes, the Director of Plans and Operations for the Army Service Forces, wrote to General Brehon Somervell that "the proposal to assault Formosa is ... one of great hazard involving an extended line of communications for the assault and follow-up and their subsequent maintenance", warning that "the assault against the formidable objective of Formosa would be mounted under serious handicap which might well prejudice the success of the operation ... a defeat could be expected to entail enormous losses. An estimate of 30% is not considered excessive for such a defeat", with transport ship losses potentially delaying the invasion of Japan by 12 months.

General Holland Smith, commander of the Fleet Marine Force, cautioned Admiral Nimitz that on Taiwan "Our own assault force ... has lower relative superiority than has been the practice in assault operations in the past ... and while probably sufficient initially to establish the southern perimeter before the enemy can concentrate, may ultimately jeopardize the operation", advocating for three additional Marine divisions, totaling six, to secure Taiwan instead of Xiamen Bay to ensure victory.

=== Operational maps ===
The following visuals from the Causeway Joint Staff Study illustrate various strategic components of the proposed Operation Causeway, including shore-based air support, amphibious assault routes, and carrier-based operations planned for the invasion of Taiwan.

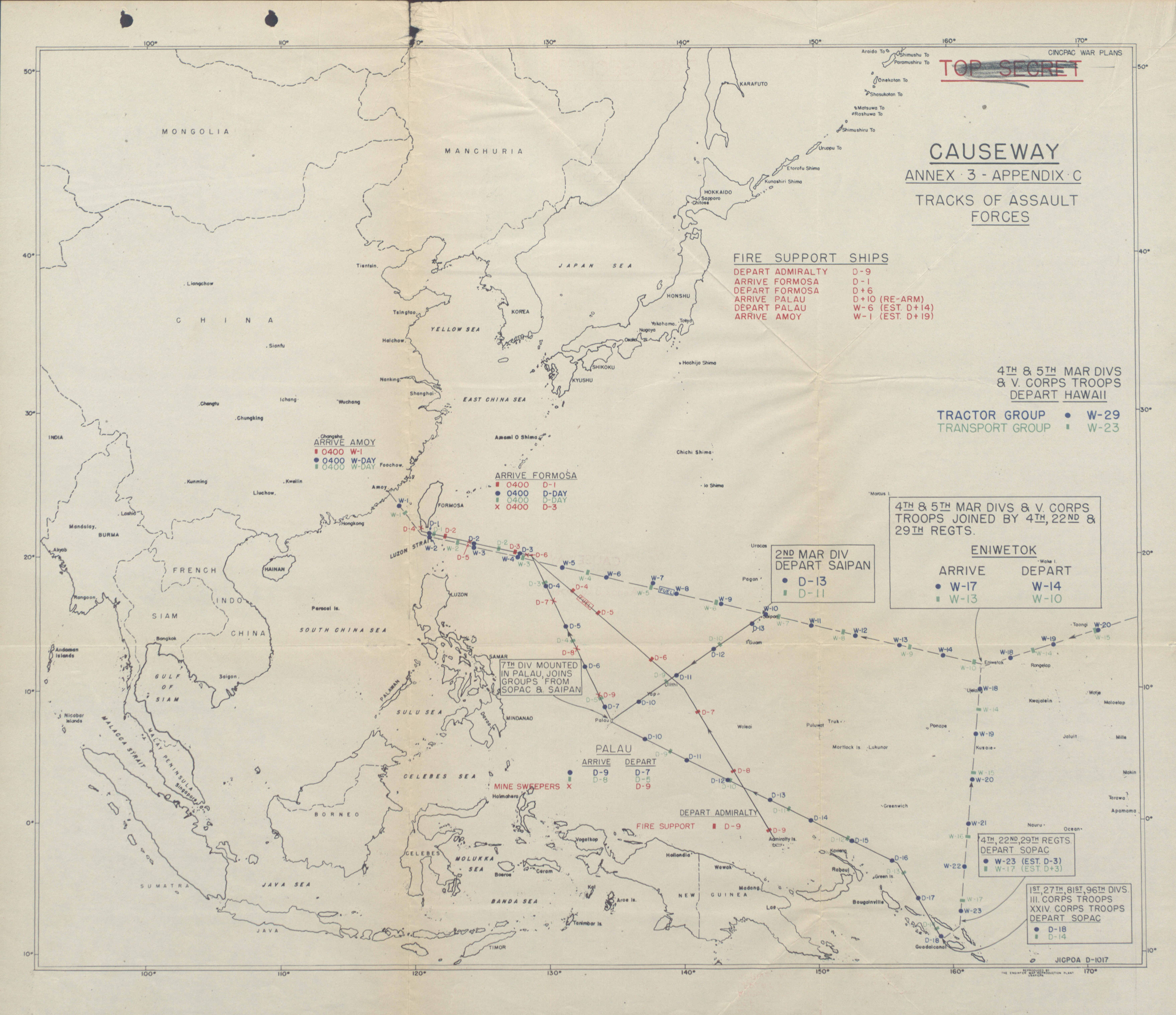
Planned approach of amphibious and fire support forces.

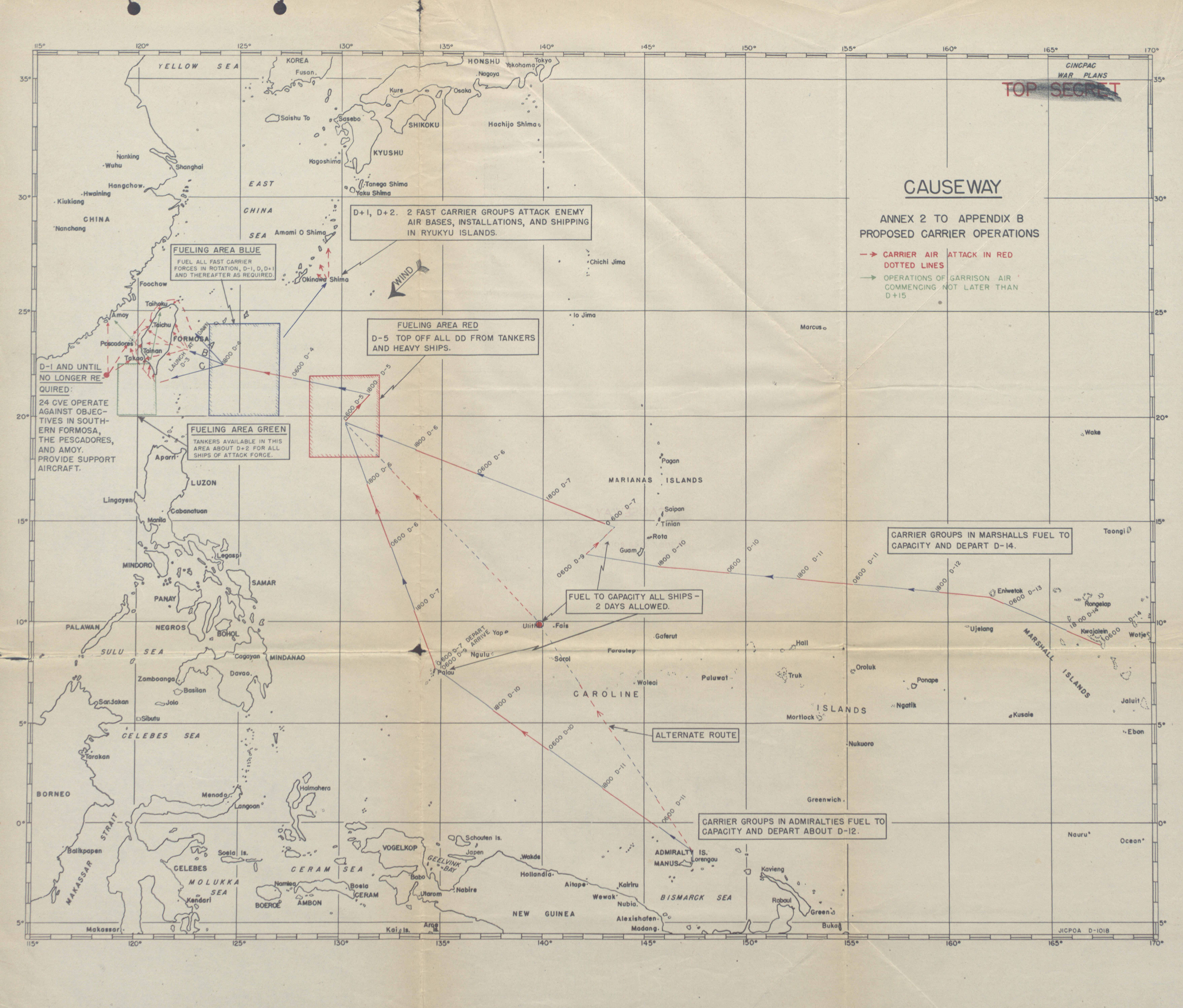
Proposed carrier strike operations and fueling areas in support of Causeway.

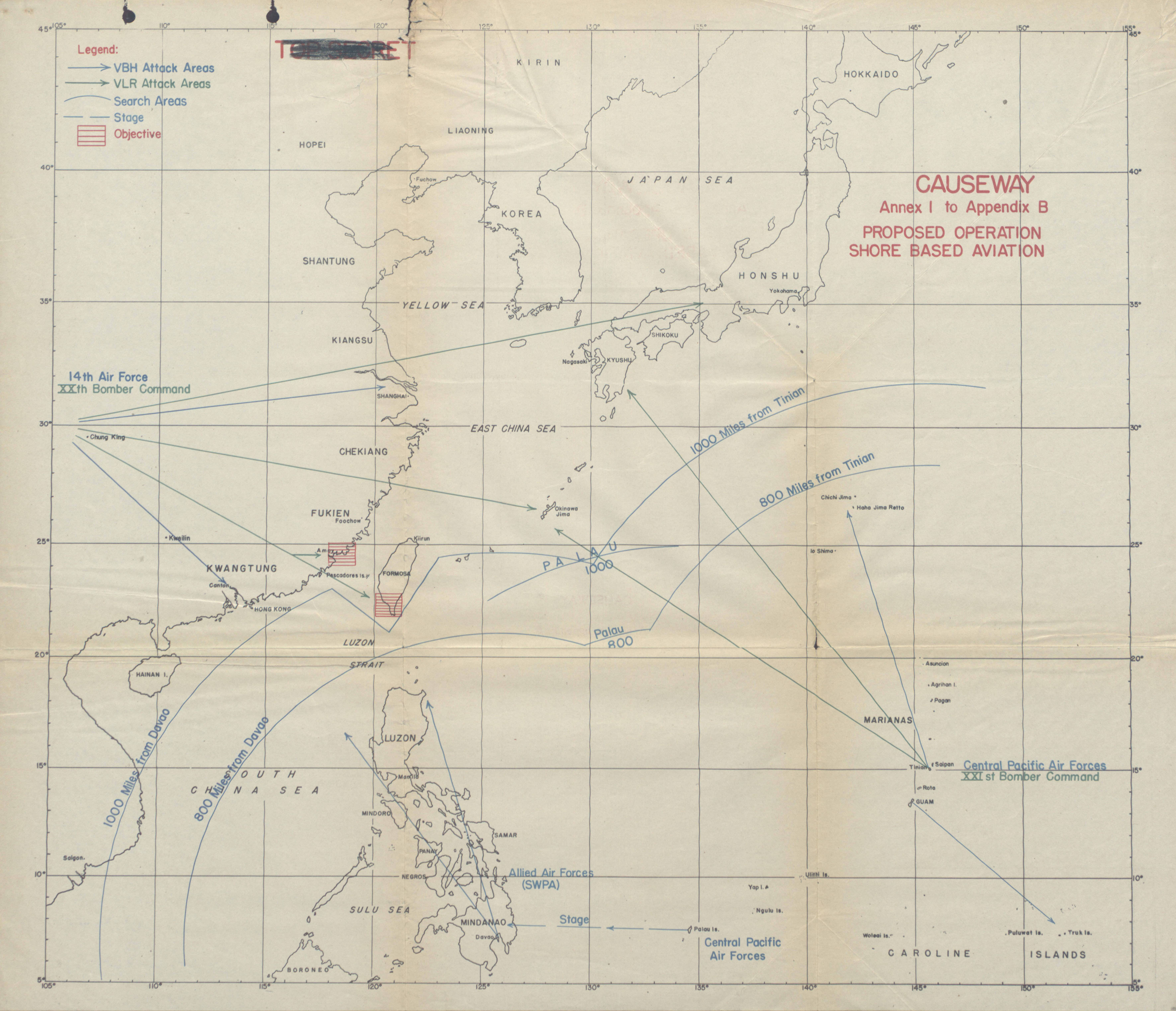
Proposed deployment of shore-based aviation assets, including the China-based Fourteenth Air Force.

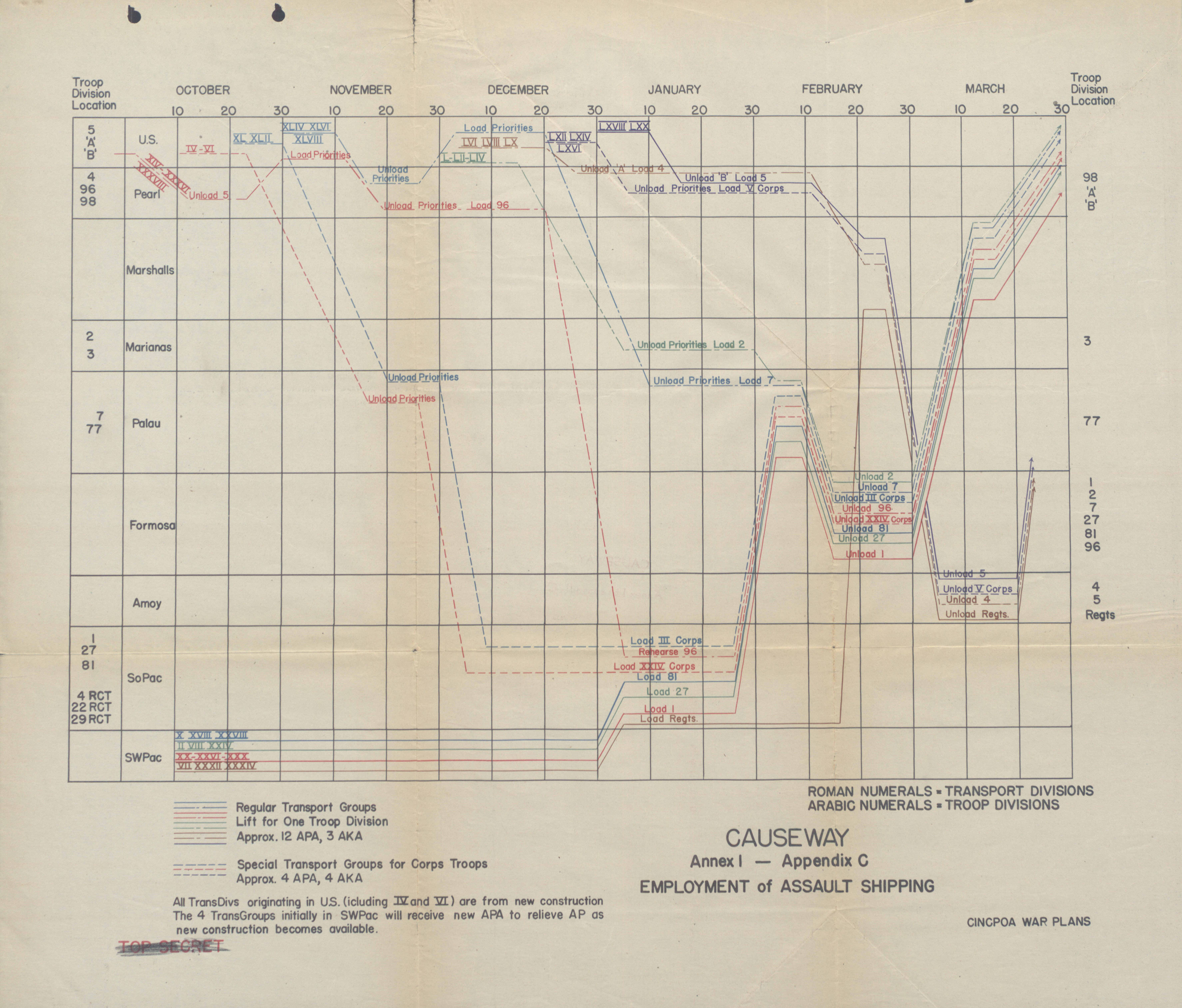
Planned employment of assault shipping from October 1944 to March 1945.

== Support and rejection ==
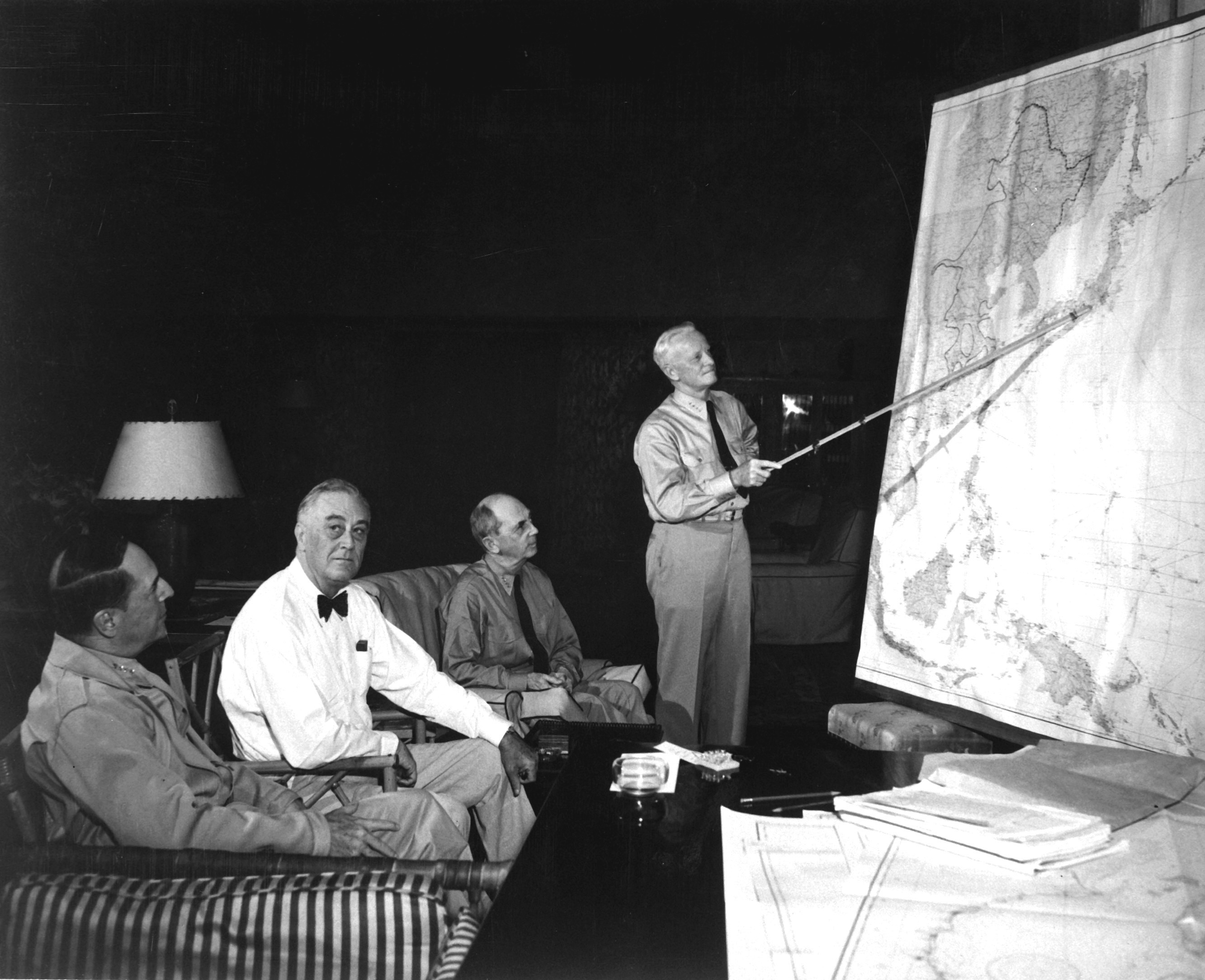
Nimitz, MacArthur, and Leahy holding a conference with FDR in Pearl Harbor, 28 July 1944

Admiral Ernest J. King, Chief of Naval Operations was a high-profile supporter of Operation Causeway. He was opposed by General MacArthur, who pushed for the invasion of Luzon in the Philippines and argued for bypassing Taiwan. Admiral Raymond Spruance, commanding the Fifth Fleet, concurred with MacArthur that Operation Causeway was unrealistic without further significant reinforcements in the Pacific theater; instead, Spruance proposed the capture of Iwo Jima and Okinawa, the latter an island smaller than Taiwan which therefore did not require additional troops to be diverted from Europe.

In June 1944, Army Chief of Staff General George Marshall, urged MacArthur to reconsider his insistence of landing in the Philippines and instead focus on a more direct route to Japan through Taiwan and Kyushu. Marshall agreed with the JSSC that if the Allies would eventually require a port on the coast of mainland China, it was better to seize Taiwan sooner rather than later. Marshall wrote, "We must be careful not to allow our personal feeling and Philippine political considerations to override our great objective, which is the early conclusion of the war with Japan... 'bypassing' is in no way synonymous with 'abandonment'."

At a high-level meeting in Pearl Harbor in July 1944, President Franklin Roosevelt conferred with General MacArthur and Admiral Nimitz. MacArthur balked at Operation Causeway and advised the president accordingly. Causeway was not formally rejected at the Pearl Harbor conference in July 1944, although MacArthur opposed it and Nimitz was, at best, lukewarm. While Admiral William Leahy, Chief of Staff to the President and de facto Chairman of the Joint Chiefs, expressed support for MacArthur's plan after the meeting, Roosevelt deferred judgement to his military experts. In the months afterwards planners continued to debate the feasibility and strategic necessity of the planned assault on Taiwan. On July 27, planners at the Joint Chiefs of Staff (Joint Strategic Survey Committee), confirmed their intention to bypass Luzon and invade Taiwan, although the final decision had not been signed by the Joint Chiefs themselves.

=== Growing opposition ===
Historian Ian Toll noted that of those who were most intimately involved in the planning of Causeway, "the more they studied Formosa, the less they liked it". General Buckner doubted the feasibility of the entire operation and told Nimitz that it was not worth the expected costs, noting that the strategic necessity to capture Taiwan would diminish should Luzon be captured. Buckner opined that "it appears as though the expenditure of life and treasure might more profitably be exerted on objectives nearer the Japanese homeland." General Robert Richardson Jr. bluntly told Nimitz that "the occupation of Formosa is unnecessary to the prosecution of the war". Nimitz's deputy, Admiral Forrest Sherman, called the idea of capturing Taiwan before Luzon "ridiculous", Admiral Richmond K. Turner, the commander of Pacific amphibious forces, concurred with him. Admiral Spruance remained implacably opposed to Causeway and was determined to replace it with the Iwo Jima-Okinawa option; he and Sherman assumed that the disadvantages of Causeway were so obvious that the plan would be inevitably cancelled.

The scale of Causeway posed a conflict with other priorities, such as the timely development of B-29 airbases on Saipan and Guam. Admiral John Towers warned King that the Army Air Forces "would fight any change" to the airfield schedule. General Henry Arnold had also emerged as an opponent of Causeway; he believed that the Marianas, not China, would be the decisive base for the strategic bombing of Japan. General Millard Harmon, commander of Army Air Forces in the Pacific, argued that launching air raids on Honshu from Taiwan, as opposed to the Marianas, would expose them to anti-aircraft fire from the Ryukyus and Kyushu; he favored neutralizing enemy air on Taiwan by operations out of Luzon. Harmon concluded that "engaging in major operations for Formosa would decelerate the momentum of the advance against the Japanese empire".

In addition, one of the main reasons for Operation Causeway—capturing Taiwan as a stepping stone to mainland China—became far less compelling as the Allied position in China continued to deteriorate in late 1944. Much of eastern and southeastern China appeared irretrievably lost following sweeping Japanese offensives in Operation Ichi-Go. At the same time, the last remaining B-29 air bases from which the Fourteenth Air Force could effectively support an invasion of Taiwan were also lost.

=== Abandonment ===
Nimitz recognized the immense risks and limited strategic necessity of landing on Taiwan, ultimately agreeing with his planners that they had to shut down Operation Causeway. In September 1944, the Joint Chiefs of Staff tentatively scheduled the invasion of Taiwan for 1 March 1945. Later, at a meeting in San Francisco on September 29, Admiral Nimitz made his case against Causeway to his superior, Admiral King. Nimitz was supported by a letter signed by General Buckner, stating that the troops allocated to Taiwan were "far short of the forces required" by the Army, but sufficient for taking Okinawa.

According to Spruance, King continued to argue the case for Causeway, "but finally gave in and said he would recommend Luzon-Iwo Jima-Okinawa to the Joint Chiefs of Staff in Washington, which he did." However, King insisted to the other Joint Chiefs that "favorable developments in the Pacific and in Europe might make Causeway feasible at a later date".

On October 3, the Joint Chiefs of Staff issued new directives sending MacArthur into Luzon in December 1944, the Marines into Iwo Jima in January 1945, and a combined Navy-Army-Marine force into Okinawa in March 1945. That fixed the sequence of major operations for the last year of the Pacific War.

== See also ==
- War Plan Orange
