= Simon Bolivar Buckner Jr. =

American lieutenant general (1886–1945)

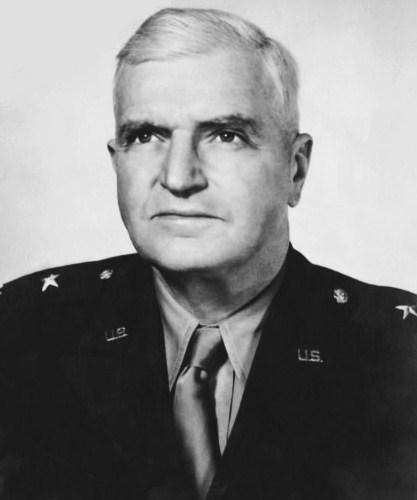
- Buckner as a brigadier general, 1940
- Born: 18 July 1886; Munfordville, Kentucky, United States
- Died: 18 June 1945 (aged 58); Okinawa, Japan
- Spouse: Adele Blanc Buckner
- Relatives: Simon Bolivar Buckner (father)
- Military career
- Allegiance: United States
- Branch: United States Army
- Service years: 1908–1945
- Rank: Lieutenant General; General (posthumous)
- Nickname: “The Silver Stallion of Alaska”
- Service number: 0-2730
- Unit: Infantry Branch
- Commands: Tenth United States Army; Alaska Defense Command; 22nd Infantry Regiment
- Conflicts: Philippine–American War; World War I; World War II; Aleutian Islands campaign; Battle of Attu; Volcano and Ryukyu Islands campaign; Battle of Okinawa †
- Awards: Distinguished Service Cross; Army Distinguished Service Medal; Navy Distinguished Service Medal; Purple Heart

Simon Bolivar Buckner Jr. (/ˈsaɪmən ˈbɒlɪvər ˈbʌknər/ SY-mən BOL-i-vər BUK-nər; 18 July 1886 – 18 June 1945) was a lieutenant general in the United States Army during World War II who served in the Pacific Theater. As commanding general of Alaska Defense Command, Buckner commanded American-Canadian forces in the Aleutian Islands campaign, including the Battle of Attu and the Kiska Expedition. Following that assignment, he was promoted to command the Tenth Army, which conducted the amphibious invasion of the Japanese island of Okinawa in 1945. He was killed during the closing days of the Battle of Okinawa by enemy artillery fire, making him the highest-ranking United States military officer lost to enemy fire during World War II.

Buckner, Lesley J. McNair, Frank Maxwell Andrews, and Millard Harmon, all lieutenant generals at the time of their deaths, were the highest-ranking Americans to be killed in World War II. Buckner and McNair were posthumously promoted to the rank of four-star general on 19 July 1954, by a Special Act of Congress (Public Law 83-508).

== Early life and education ==
Buckner was the son of Confederate general Simon Bolivar Buckner and his wife Delia Hayes Claiborne. Buckner and his father are named after the Venezuelan soldier and statesman, Simón Bolívar, who led what are currently the countries of Colombia, Venezuela, Ecuador, Panama, Peru, and Bolivia to independence from the Spanish Empire. His father was Governor of Kentucky from 1887 to 1891, and was the Gold Democratic Party's candidate for Vice President of the United States in 1896. Buckner was raised near Munfordville, Kentucky, and accompanied his father on his 1896 presidential campaign when he served as the running mate of ex-Union general John M. Palmer.

== Military career ==
Buckner attended the Virginia Military Institute. When he turned 18 in the summer of 1904, his father asked President Theodore Roosevelt to grant him an appointment to West Point. Roosevelt granted this request and Buckner graduated in the class of 1908. He served two military tours in the Philippines, and wrote about his adventures in Tales of the Philippines – In the Early 1900s. It was on a transport ship headed to Manila when he had a revelation about the importance of military service. Writing to his mother:

In civil life success is inseparably linked with money but in military life there is a much higher aim. To render the greatest possible service to his government is the duty of every officer, and this should be his highest ambition. The civilian works chiefly for himself and is considered successful according to what he has done for himself. The incentive which we have in our work is expressed in the motto of our Alma Mater, "Duty, Honor, Country", and it is far more satisfactory to have this before us than to feel that we are working purely from motives of self-interest.

During World War I, he served as a temporary major, drilling discipline into aviator cadets.

=== Inter-war period ===
For the 17 years beginning May 1919, Buckner's assignments were not with troops but with military schools as follows: four years as tactical officer at the United States Military Academy, West Point, New York; one year as student at The Infantry School at Fort Benning, Georgia; four years at the Command and General Staff School, Ft. Leavenworth, Kansas, with the first year as a student (distinguished graduate), then three years as instructor; four years at the Army War College, Washington, D.C., with year one as student then three years as executive officer; four more years at West Point, as Assistant Commandant and Commandant of Cadets. At West Point, "His rule is remembered for constructive progressiveness, with a share of severity tempered with hard, sound sense, and justice." However, one cadet's parent commented: "Buckner forgets cadets are born, not quarried."

Buckner was with troops for the rest of his career. In September 1936 he became executive officer of the 23rd Infantry Regiment at Ft. Sam Houston in Texas. Promoted to colonel in January 1937, he was given command of the 66th Infantry (Light Tank) at Ft. Meade in Maryland. In September 1938, he commanded of the 22nd Infantry at Ft. McClellan, Alabama. From November 1939 to August 1940 he was Chief of Staff of the 6th Division at Camp Jackson in South Carolina, Ft. Benning in Georgia, and Camp Beauregard in Louisiana.

=== World War II ===
==== Alaska ====
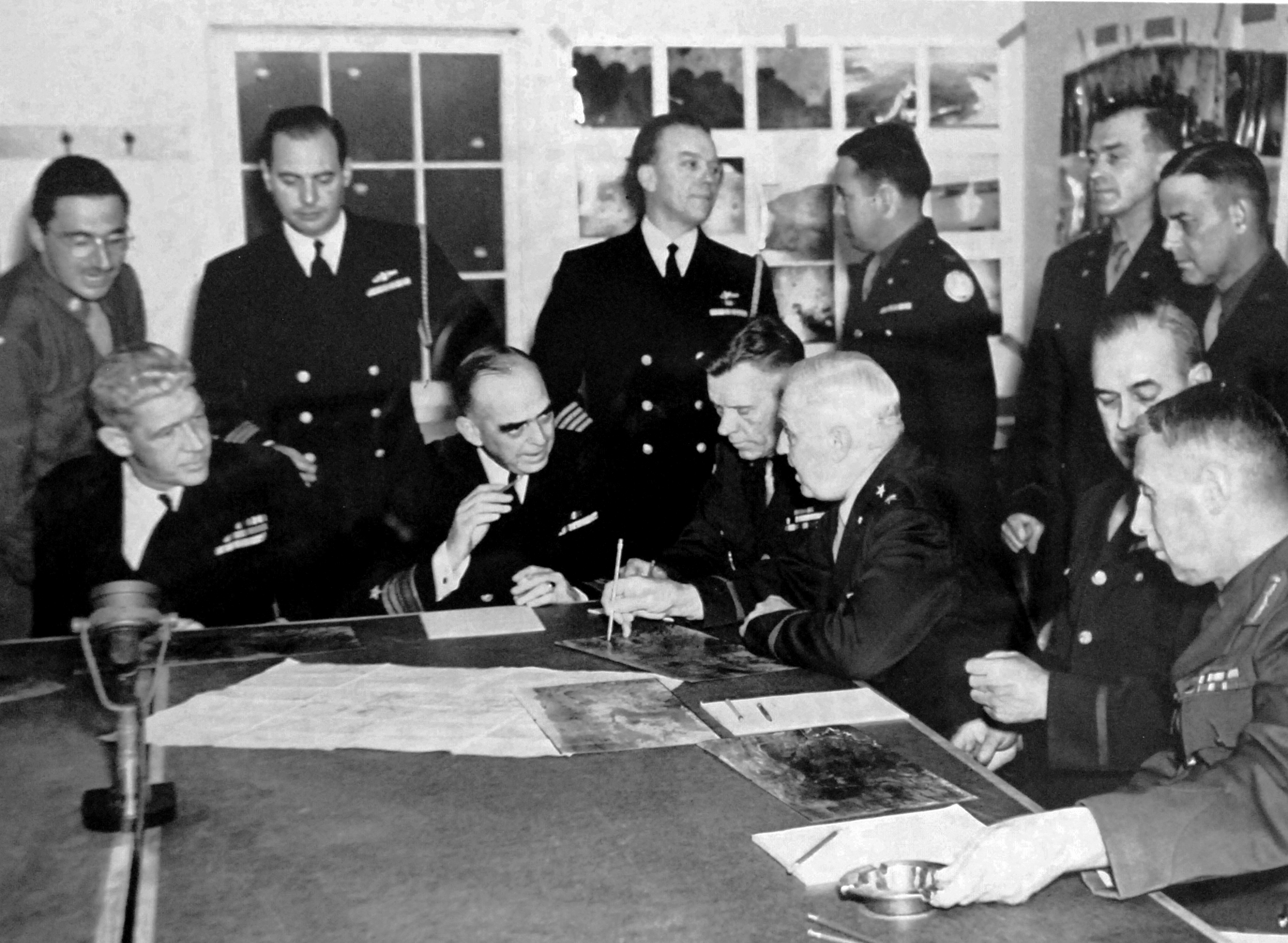
Buckner (sitting, 3rd right) with Vice Admiral Thomas C. Kinkaid (sitting, 2nd left) during the Aleutian Islands Campaign

Buckner was promoted to brigadier general in 1940 and was assigned to fortify and protect Alaska as commander of the Army's Alaska Defense Command. He was promoted to major general in August 1941. He became known as a hard, tough leader, sleeping under a single sheet no matter how cold it was and denying his men the use of under arm deodorants, declaring that a man should smell like a man.

The Japanese launched a surprise attack on Dutch Harbor 3–5 June 1942; farther west, Imperial Japanese forces seized the islands Kiska and Attu, bringing ashore some 7,000 troops (at Kiska) and nearly 3,000 at Attu. American commanders, including Buckner, feared that the Japanese would use the islands as bases to strike within range along the rest of the US West Coast. Lieutenant Paul Bishop of the 28th Bombardment Group recalled that:

General Simon B. Buckner Jr. said to us that the Japanese would have the opportunity to set up airbases in the Aleutians, making coastal cities like Anchorage, Seattle, and San Francisco vulnerable within range to attack by their bombers. The fear of that scenario was real at the time because the Japanese were nearly invincible and ruthless in Asia and the Pacific. We knew that they bombed China relentlessly and by surprise on Pearl Harbor, so we had to make sure it wouldn't happen here in the continental U.S. similar to what the Germans did over London and Coventry.

Buckner gave orders in June 1942 for the indigenous Aleut people to be evacuated and for their villages to be burned. The Aleut people were not allowed to return until 1945, after the war was over. Buckner furthermore objected to the deployment of African American troops in Alaska, writing to his superiors of his concern that they would remain after the war, "with the natural result that they would interbreed with the Indians and the Eskimos and produce an astonishingly objectionable race of mongrels which would be a problem".

The campaign to take back Attu Island took nearly a year. The Battle for Attu, Operation Landcrab, occurred across three weeks in May 1943. The casualties on both sides were high. On shore, some 549 US soldiers were killed, 1,148 were wounded, and 1,814 suffered cold and disease. Of the 2,900 Japanese garrison, only 28 survived.

The loyal courage, vigorous energy and determined fortitude of our armed forces in Alaska—on land, in the air and on the water—have turned back the tide of Japanese invasion, ejected the enemy from our shores and made a fortress of our last frontier. But this is only the beginning. We have opened the road to Tokyo; the shortest, most direct and most devastating to our enemies. May we soon travel that road to victory.

— Lieutenant General Simon Bolivar Buckner Jr., a few months after the Aleutian Islands Campaign

Subsequently, in August 1943, Kiska was invaded by Canadian and US soldiers. However, its Japanese garrison had been secretly withdrawn under cover of fog prior to the arrival of Allied forces. Allied commanders refused to believe that the Japanese could have completely evacuated Kiska. For eight days, troops searched the island, firing into the dense fog and sometimes accidentally shooting their comrades. The bombardment and invasion of the deserted island was written off as a "training exercise", and the Aleutian Campaign officially ended after 439 days of warfare. In 1943, Buckner was promoted to lieutenant general.

==== Battle of Okinawa ====
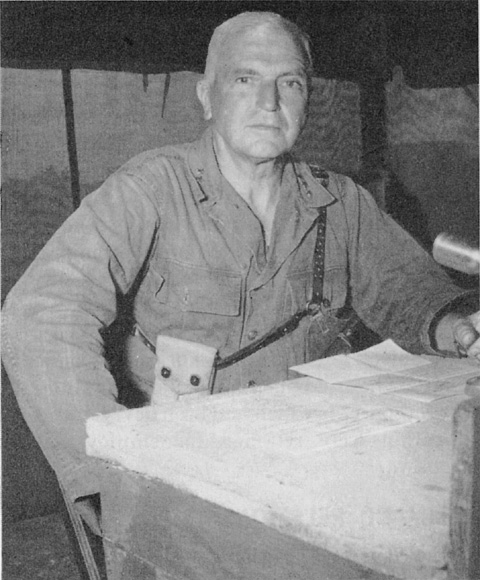
Buckner on Okinawa, 1945

In July 1944, Buckner was sent to Hawaii to organize the Tenth Army, which was composed of both Army and Marine Corps units. The original mission of the Tenth Army was to prepare for Operation Causeway, the invasion of Taiwan. However, this operation was canceled, and Buckner's command was instead ordered to prepare for the Battle of Okinawa. Beginning on April 1, 1945, this turned out to be one of the largest, slowest, and bloodiest sea–land–air battles in American military history. Despite historic amphibious assets, Buckner insisted on a frontal assault on the dug-in Japanese; though extremely costly in American lives, his strategy was ultimately successful. Late in the battle, Buckner failed to realize that the Japanese were pulling back to a secondary defensive line, allowing the Japanese to avoid destruction and escape with a significant force. Reducing this force in the southern part of the island cost enormous casualties, especially among the civilian population, who were trapped in the battle zone. Total American deaths during the battle of Okinawa were 12,513.

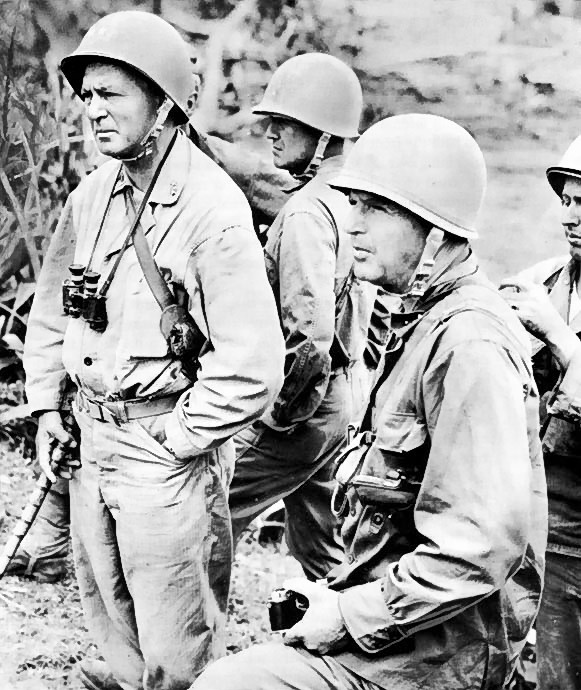
Buckner (foreground, holding camera), photographed with Major General Lemuel C. Shepherd Jr., USMC, on Okinawa

A quote of his from 1945 was reported in the newspapers back home when he said that he intended to Christianize the Japanese and that "the best way to do that was to give them a Christian burial".

On May 29, 1945, Marines from Company A, 1st Battalion, 5th Marine Regiment (nicknamed the "Rebel Company") captured the ruins of Shuri Castle. Lacking a U.S. flag at the time, Captain Julian D. Dusenbury raised a small Confederate battle flag he had carried in his helmet. The flag flew for two to three days. Upon hearing of it, Buckner ordered it taken down, stating it was inappropriate because "Americans from all over are involved in this battle". The regulation replaced it with 48-star flag of the United States.

Death

On June 18, Buckner arrived in his command jeep which was flying its standard 3-star flag to visit a forward observation post on a ridge approximately 300 yards (270 m) behind the front lines, as Marine infantry advanced on the Japanese-held Ibaru Ridge. Visits from the general were not always welcome as his presence frequently drew enemy fire, usually as he was departing. Buckner had arrived with his standard three stars showing on the front of his steel helmet and a nearby Marine outpost sent a signal to Buckner's position stating that they could clearly see the general's three stars on his helmet. Told of this, Buckner replaced his own helmet with an unmarked one.

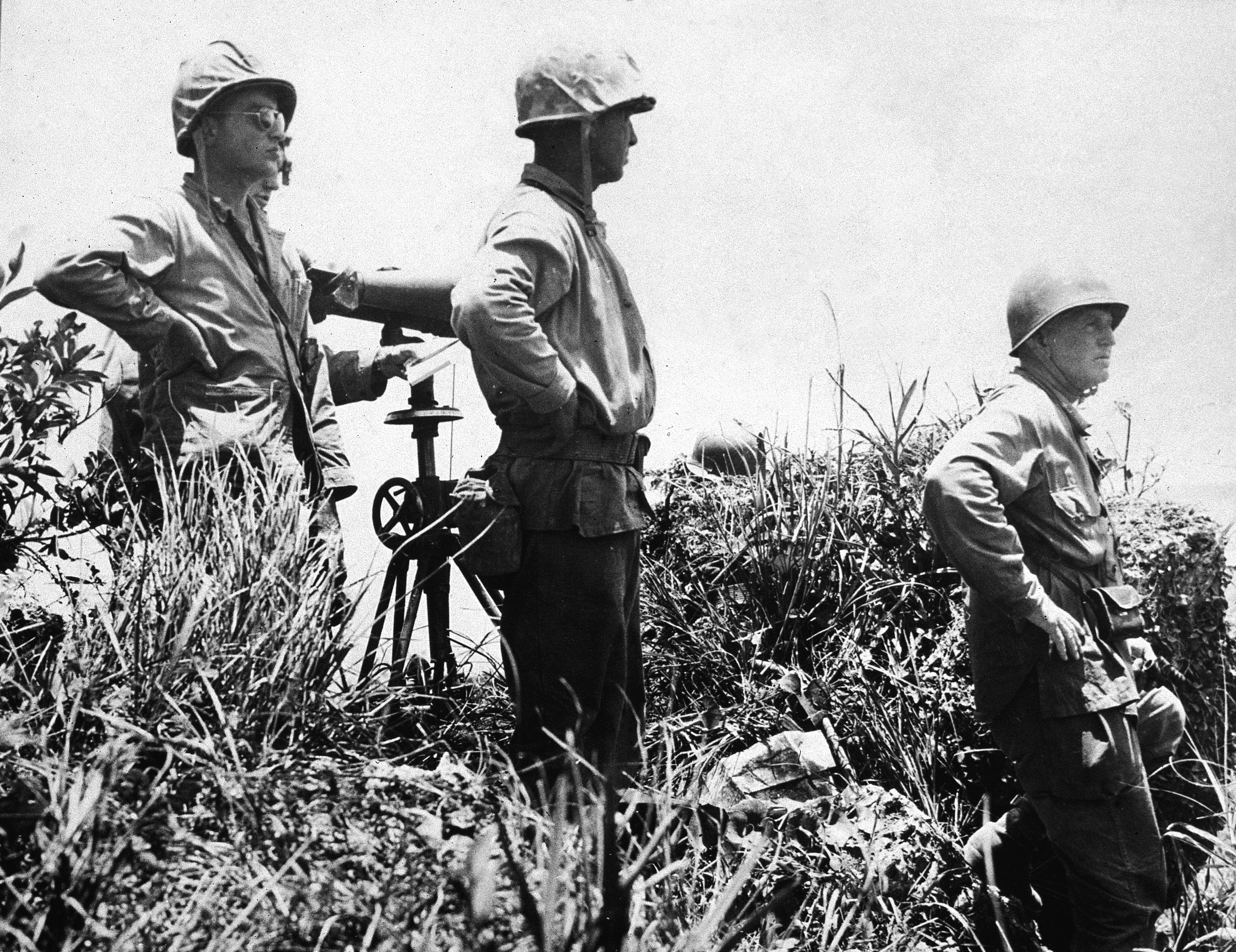
The last picture of Buckner (right), taken just before he was killed by a Japanese artillery shell.

As Buckner stood at the outpost, a small flat-trajectory Japanese artillery shell of unknown caliber (estimated to have been 47mm) struck a coral rock outcrop near him, and fragments pierced his chest. Buckner was carried by stretcher to a nearby aid station, where he died on the operating table. He was succeeded in command by Marine General Roy Geiger.

Buckner was the highest-ranking American military officer killed during World War II, and he remained the highest-ranked officer killed in action until the death of Lieutenant General Timothy Maude during the September 11 attacks in 2001.

== Personal life ==
Buckner was married to Adele Blanc Buckner (1893–1988). They had three children.

Buckner is interred in the Frankfort Cemetery overlooking the city of Frankfort and the Kentucky State Capitol.

== Legacy ==
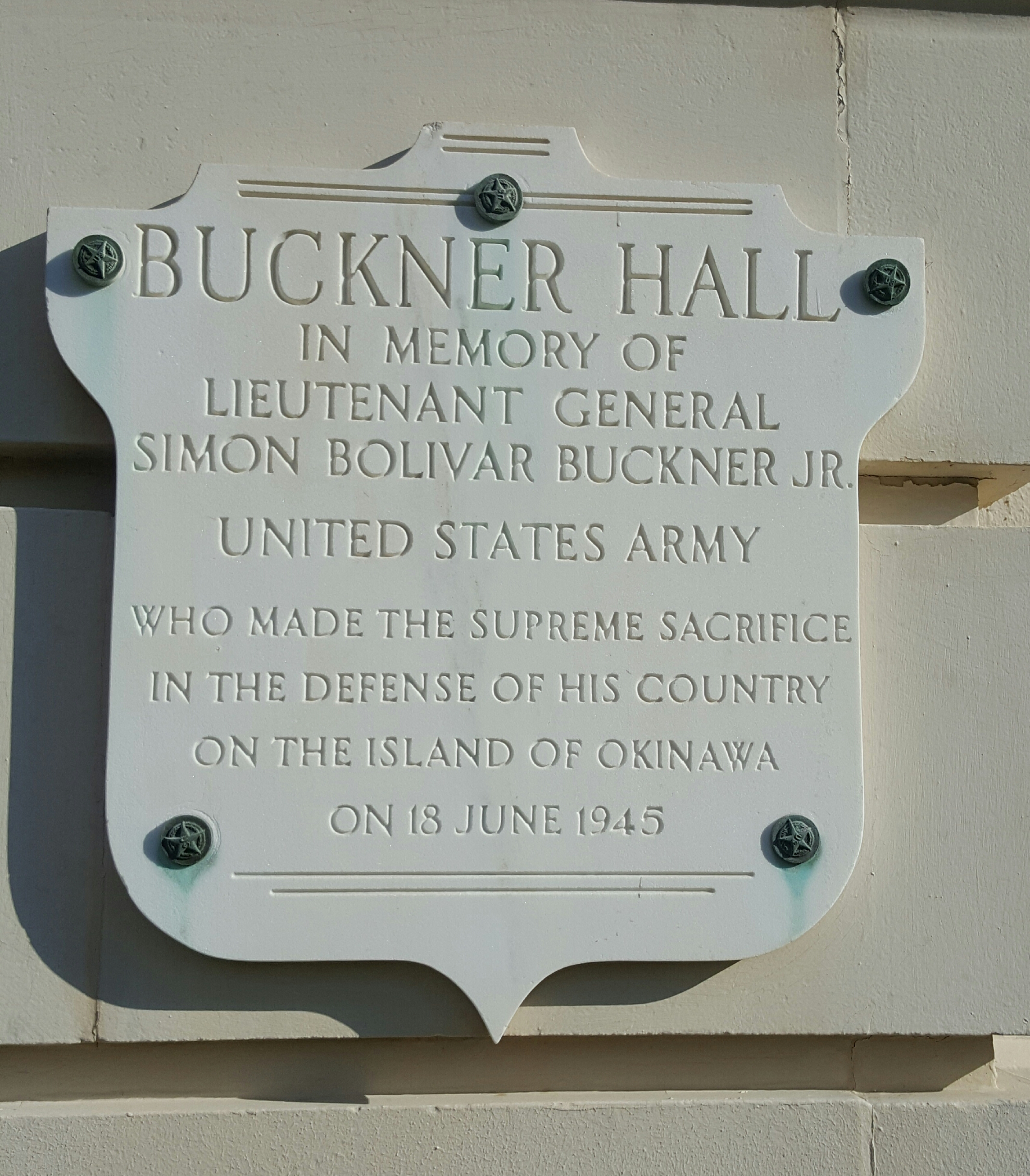
Plaque on Fort McClellan building

Named in honor of Buckner:

- Fort Buckner, an Army sub-post of the Marine Corps' Camp Foster on Okinawa, is home to the 78th Signal Battalion and E Co. of the 53rd Signal Battalion and includes a small memorial to its namesake.
- USNS General Simon B. Buckner (T-AP-123), an Admiral W. S. Benson class troop transport.
- Nakagusuku Bay on the East side of Okinawa was nicknamed "Buckner Bay" in the 1940s by American military personnel. They often refer to it as such to this day, even in official correspondence.
- West Point's Camp Buckner, where yearlings (incoming sophomores) go through Cadet Field Training (CFT).
- Several places built in Alaska during Cold War-related military construction, including:
  - Buckner Gymnasium (also Fieldhouse and Physical Fitness Center) at Fort Richardson (now part of Joint Base Elmendorf-Richardson) in Anchorage, Alaska, a post which the general established during World War II.
  - The Buckner Building in Whittier, Alaska, once the largest building in Alaska by square footage.
  - Buckner Drive in the Nunaka Valley subdivision of Anchorage, originally built as military housing.
- Buckner Drive in Fort Leavenworth's Normandy Village.
- Buckner Avenue in Fort George Meade's Heritage Park.
- Buckner Gate at Fort Shafter, Hawaii.
- Buckner Hall, the Headquarters Building at the former Fort McClellan
- Buckner Circle, the street at the former Fort McClellan where the senior officer homes (20) were located, all facing a central greenspace
- Buckner Road, Mount Vernon, Virginia, along with McNair Road, Patton Road and Stillwell Avenue, all US Army generals in Woodlawn Manor neighborhood.

== Military awards ==
Buckner's military decorations and awards include:

Distinguished Service Cross		Army Distinguished Service Medal
Navy Distinguished Service Medal	Purple Heart	World War I Victory Medal
American Defense Service Medal	Asiatic-Pacific Campaign Medal	World War II Victory Medal

== Dates of rank ==
Insignia	Rank	Component	Date
No insignia	Cadet	USMA	16 June 1904
No insignia in 1908	Second Lieutenant	Regular Army	14 February 1908
	First Lieutenant	Regular Army	5 August 1914
	Captain	Regular Army	5 May 1917
	Major	Temporary	5 August 1917
	Captain	Regular Army	21 August 1919
	Major	Regular Army	1 July 1920
	Lieutenant Colonel	Regular Army	1 April 1932
	Colonel	Regular Army	11 January 1937
	Brigadier General	Regular Army	1 September 1940
	Major General	Army of the United States	4 August 1941
	Lieutenant General	Army of the United States	4 May 1943
	General	Posthumous	19 July 1954

== Bibliography ==
- Coski, John. M (2005). The Confederate Battle Flag. Harvard University Press. ISBN 978-0674019836.
- Haley, J. Fred (November 1982). "The Death of General Simon Bolivar Buckner". Marine Corps Gazette: 103.
- Kolakowski, Christopher L., ed. (2024). Tenth Army Commander: The World War II Diary of Simon Bolivar Buckner Jr. Casemate Publishers. ISBN 978-1-63624-199-9.
- McKenney, Tom C (June 2000). "Lt. Gen. Simon Bolivar Buckner's death". Military. No. 1. XVII: 22, 23.
- Sarantakes, Nicholas, ed. (2004). Seven Stars, The Okinawa Battle Diaries of Simon Bolivar Buckner Jr. and Joseph Stilwell. Texas A & M University Press, College Station. ISBN 978-1-58544-294-2.
- Sledge, Eugene B. (1990). With the Old Breed: At Peleliu and Okinawa. Oxford University Press. ISBN 978-0-19-506714-9.
- Taaffe, Stephen R. (2013). Marshall and His Generals: U.S. Army Commanders in World War II. Lawrence, Kansas: University Press of Kansas. ISBN 978-0-7006-1942-9. OCLC 840162019.
- "Buck's Battle". Time Magazine. 16 April 1945.

Military offices
New command	Commanding General of the Tenth United States Army; 1944–1945	Succeeded by Roy Geiger
