= James Roy Andersen =

US Army Air Forces general (1904–1945)

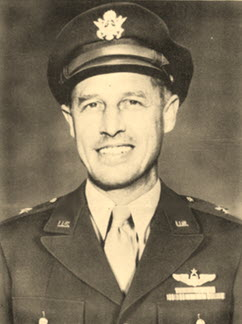
- Born: James Roy Andersen; May 10, 1904; Racine, Wisconsin
- Died: February 26, 1945 (aged 40); Near Kwajalein Atoll, Marshall Islands
- Military career
- Allegiance: United States
- Branch: United States Army
- Service years: 1926–1945
- Rank: Brigadier General
- Nickname: "Jimmy"
- Units: United States Army Air Corps; United States Army Air Forces
- Commands: Chief of Staff Pacific Ocean Area; Deputy Commander of the 20th Air Force in the Pacific
- Conflicts: World War II
- Awards: Legion of Merit

Brigadier General James Roy Andersen (May 10, 1904 – February 26, 1945) was a United States Army Air Forces officer. He was declared killed in action after an aircraft accident on February 26, 1945, over the Pacific Ocean.

== Early life and education ==
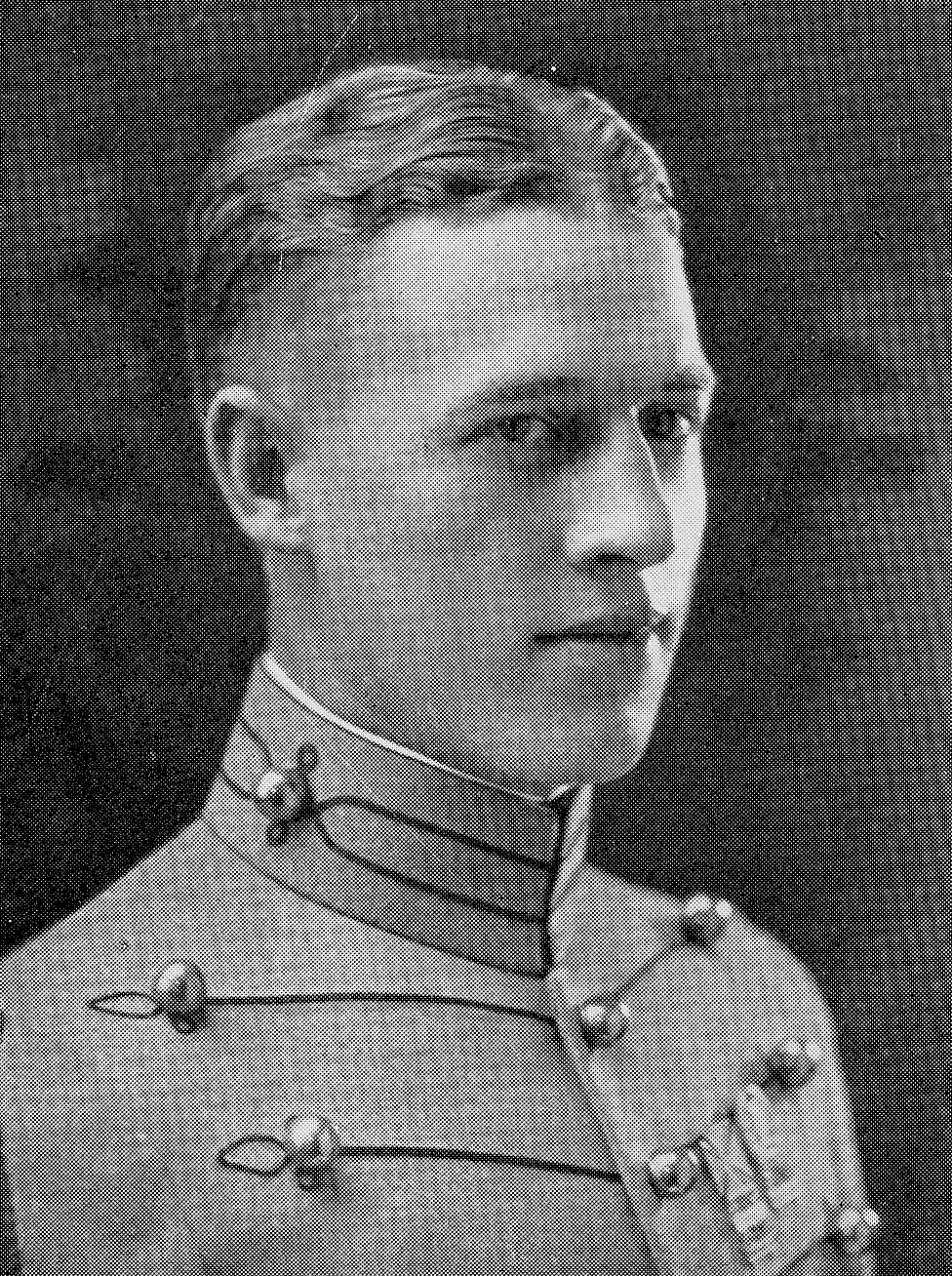
At West Point in 1926

Andersen was born in Racine, Wisconsin, on May 10, 1904, the son of Niels and Inger (Klausen) Andersen. He graduated from Racine High School in 1922.

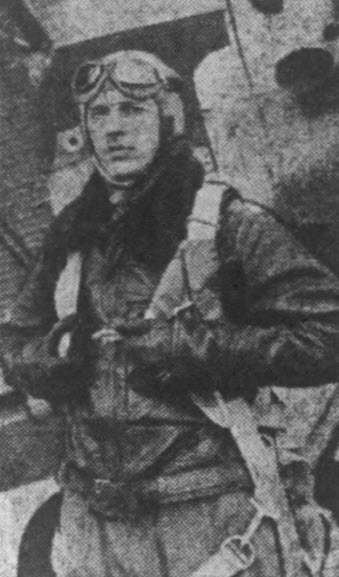
Captain J.R. Andersen, Kelly Field, 1937

He graduated from the United States Military Academy on the Hudson River at West Point, New York, on June 12, 1926, fourth in his class.

Shortly after graduating, married his high school sweetheart, Esther Katherine Hau. Together they had a son and a daughter; Jay and Nancy Jo.

He had earned a Bachelor of Science from United States Military Academy, 1926; a Master of Science, Ordnance Technology School (United States Army), 1934; Graduated from Army Air Force Primary and Basic Flying School, 1936; Advanced Flying School, 1937; and Tactical School, 1940.

== Military career ==
After graduating from West Point, he was assigned to the 2nd Infantry at Fort Sheridan Illinois for 2 years, then served 3 years at Schofield Barracks, Hawaii; 3 years at Aberdeen (Maryland) Proving Ground Command and Picatinny Arsenal, New Jersey; one year in Boston, and one year at Selfridge Field, Michigan, plus one year in San Antonio, Texas. He graduated from the Massachusetts Institute of Technology in 1934 with a Master of Science degree. He spent 6 years in the infantry and 3 years in ordnance before entering into flight school. In 1936, he was promoted to captain and obtained his wings at Kelly Field, Texas and assigned to Hickam Field, Hawaii. During World War II, he returned to West Point as an instructor, with promotion to colonel by early 1943. During 1943-1944 he served on the U.S. War Department General Staff. In January 1945, Andersen was promoted to brigadier general and assigned to HQ AAF, Pacific Ocean Area. He was a rated air observer, air pilot, and senior air pilot.

== Disappearance ==
Andersen is believed to have died on February 26, 1945, in an aircraft accident near Kwajalein Island.

Traveling from Guam to a high-level conference in Washington, D.C., he and Lieutenant General Millard Harmon boarded the Consolidated C-87A Liberator Express serial number 41-24174, piloted by Major Francis Euel Savage. The aircraft landed safely at Bucholz Army Airfield to refuel, but disappeared after taking off between Kwajalein and Johnston Island, while en route to Hawaii.

Afterwards, the U.S. Navy (USN) was in charge of the search for the aircraft. Despite intensive searches by aircraft from both U.S. Army Air Force (USAAF) and U.S. Navy (USN) aircraft plus surface vessels, no trace of the aircraft or anyone aboard was ever located.

The entire crew was officially declared dead on February 26, 1945.

== Legacy ==
On Oct. 7, 1949, North Guam Air Force Base (in the United States territory of Guam) was renamed Andersen Air Force Base in his memory.

He has memorial markers in Arlington National Cemetery, Brunswick Memorial Park, Brunswick, GA., and at the Tablets of the Missing at the National Memorial Cemetery of the Pacific, in Honolulu, Hawaii.

== Career ==
=== Service ===
1940-07-01 – 1942-XX-XX - Instructor at Department of Chemistry & Electricity, US Military Academy West Point
1942-03-XX – 1943-06-XX - Director of Training at the Army Air Force Basic Advanced Flying School, West Point
1943-06-XX – 1944-08-XX - Attached to Plans Division, War Department General Staff, Hickum Air Field, Hawaii
1944-08-XX – 1945-02-26 - Chief of Staff, US Army Air Forces Pacific Ocean Areas, Harmon Field, Guam
1945-02-26 – Lost in an airplane crash at sea
1945-03-17 – Search abandoned
1946-02-27 – Declared dead

=== Promotions ===
1926 – Second lieutenant (United States Army)
1936 – Captain (United States Army Air Corps (USAAC))
1942-01-05 – Major (United States Army Air Forces (USAAF))
1942-03-01 – Lieutenant Colonel (United States Army Air Forces (USAAF))
1943-06-12 – Colonel (United States Army Air Forces (USAAF))
1945-01-21 – Brigadier-General (United States Army Air Forces (USAAF))

== Awards and decorations ==
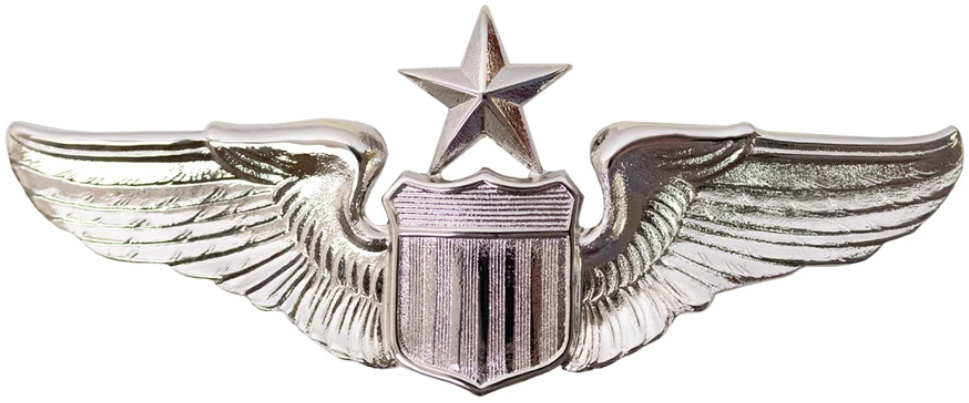
United States Aviator Badge
Legion of Merit
Air Medal
Purple Heart Medal
Good Conduct Medal
American Campaign Medal
Presidential Unit Citation
Asiatic–Pacific Campaign Medal
World War II Victory Medal

== See also ==
- List of people who disappeared mysteriously at sea
