= Gustav Joseph Braun =

American World War I and World War II army general

- Born: January 15, 1895; Buffalo, New York, U.S.
- Died: March 17, 1945 (aged 50); Italy
- Burial place: Arlington National Cemetery, Arlington, Virginia, U.S.
- Military career
- Allegiance: United States
- Branch: United States Army
- Service years: 1910–1945
- Rank: Brigadier General
- Units: 133rd Infantry Regiment, 34th Infantry Division
- Conflicts: Mexican Expedition; World War I World War II
- Awards: Distinguished Service Cross (2); Silver Star; Croix de Guerre (France); Croce di Guerra (Italy); British War Medal; Purple Heart

Gustav Joseph Braun (January 15, 1895 – March 17, 1945) was a decorated American United States Army officer who served in three major U.S. military engagements: the Mexican Expedition, World War I, and World War II. A veteran of two world wars, Braun was twice awarded the Distinguished Service Cross for extraordinary heroism in combat. He was killed in action while serving as Assistant Division Commander of the 34th Infantry Division in Italy during World War II.

== Early life and military career ==
Gustav Braun was born in Buffalo, New York, on January 15, 1895.

He began his military career in 1910 by joining the New York National Guard. He served for six years, including on the Mexican Border during the Pancho Villa Expedition in 1916. In 1917, he passed the Regular Army examinations and was commissioned as a provisional officer.

== World War I ==
During World War I, Braun served with multiple American units, as well as with the British Army and the French Army, and took part in the Army of Occupation in Germany after the Armistice with Germany in November 1918. As a first lieutenant and liaison officer with the 47th Infantry Regiment, 4th Division, Braun earned the Distinguished Service Cross (DSC) for heroism near Sergy, France, on July 29–30, 1918. Under heavy fire and without medical personnel, he established a first-aid station and carried wounded men to shelter while crossing exposed terrain under shell and machine-gun fire.

He also received several foreign decorations for his WWI service, including the French Croix de Guerre, the Italian Croce di Guerra, and the British War Medal.

== Between the wars ==
Following the war and into the interwar period, Braun held numerous instructional and staff assignments. He served for eight years on the faculty at the Infantry School at Fort Benning, Georgia, and later worked in the historical section of the Army War College. He spent three years in China with the 15th Infantry and served at Fort Thomas and Fort Knox in Kentucky. He was also executive officer of the CCC Replacement Training Center at Fort Knox.

Braun later became professor of military science and tactics at the University of California, Los Angeles, and served on the staff at the Command and General Staff School at Fort Leavenworth, Kansas.

== World War II ==
In the years leading up to Pearl Harbor, Braun was a general staff officer with the IX Corps, helping to prepare West Coast defenses and coordinate training for Army National Guard units deployed to the Pacific.

After the U.S. entered World War II in December 1941, Braun served with the 7th Infantry Division and later with the VII Corps, assisting in implementing California’s coastal defense plans. From February 1943, he held multiple roles in the 34th Infantry Division including chief of staff, regimental commander of the 133rd Infantry Regiment, and assistant division commander (ADC).

He distinguished himself again during the Gothic Line offensive on the Italian Front, where the 34th was serving. On September 23, 1944, Braun demonstrated extraordinary heroism near Montepiano, Italy, earning a second DSC. Lieutenant General Mark W. Clark, commanding the U.S. Fifth Army, personally awarded him the oak leaf cluster representing the second award on November 16, 1944.

On February 13, 1945, Braun was promoted to brigadier general by General George C. Marshall, then the army chief of staff.

== Death ==
On March 17, 1945, during the fighting in Italy, near Monte Bel Monte, Braun was killed when the reconnaissance aircraft he was flying in was shot down by German forces. The 34th Division had encountered entrenched enemy resistance and was locked in a winter stalemate at the time. Braun was listed as missing in action and later presumed dead.

He is buried at Arlington National Cemetery in Arlington, Virginia.

== Awards and decorations ==
- Distinguished Service Cross (2)
- Silver Star
- Purple Heart
- Croix de Guerre (France)
- Croce di Guerra al Valor Militare (Italy)
- British War Medal

== See also ==
- List of U.S. general officers and flag officers killed in World War II
