= Charles L. Keerans =

American Army general killed in World War II

Charles Leslie Keerans Jr.
- Born: 1899; Charlotte, North Carolina, U.S.
- Died: July 11, 1943 (aged 43–44); Sicily, Italy
- Burial place: Sicily–Rome American Cemetery and Memorial, Nettuno, Italy
- Military career
- Allegiance: United States
- Branch: United States Army
- Service years: 1919–1943
- Rank: Brigadier General
- Unit: 82nd Airborne Division
- Conflicts: World War II
- Awards: Purple Heart; World War II Victory Medal; American Campaign Medal; European-African-Middle Eastern Campaign Medal; Army Presidential Unit Citation; Army Good Conduct Medal; Parachutist Badge

Charles Leslie Keerans Jr. (1899 – July 11, 1943) was a Brigadier General in the United States Army during World War II. He was the Deputy Commanding General of the 82nd Airborne Division and went missing in action during the Allied invasion of Sicily in July 1943.

== Early life and military career ==
Charles Leslie Keerans Jr. was born in January 1899 in Charlotte, North Carolina.

He graduated from the United States Military Academy (USMA) at West Point, New York, as part of the class of 1919.

== World War II ==
In January 1943, Keerans, having previously served as chief of staff of the 101st Airborne Division, became the assistant division commander (ADC) of the 82nd Airborne Division that month. He was promoted to the rank of brigadier general in the Army of the United States (AUS) in February.

That July, the division participated in a night combat jump into the area around the Gulf of Gela during the Allied invasion of Sicily. The operation, known as Husky II, experienced serious problems, including incidents of friendly fire in which multiple American transport planes were shot down by U.S. forces.

On the night of July 11, a group of 144 aircraft from the 316th Troop Carrier Group flew toward Sicily to drop reinforcements. On board one of the planes were Brigadier General Keerans and Captain Tracy Jackson, a glider officer from the 52nd Troop Carrier Wing.

As the planes approached the island, they flew over the Allied invasion fleet and were mistakenly fired upon by American anti-aircraft gunners. A total of twenty-three transport planes were shot down by friendly fire from U.S. warships, merchant vessels, and infantry on the coast of Sicily.

Keerans’ aircraft was among those hit. The pilot managed to crash-land the plane in the water, approximately 400 yards off the Sicilian coast. Keerans survived the crash and was seen the following morning speaking with a sergeant from another unit. He reportedly asked the sergeant to accompany him inland, but the sergeant declined, choosing to return to his own unit. Keerans proceeded inland alone and was never seen again.

Initially, the U.S. Army believed Keerans had died in the crash, but the sergeant’s later account led to him being listed as Missing in action and ultimately declared dead on July 11, 1943.

== Memorialization ==
Keerans is memorialized on the Tablets of the Missing at the Sicily–Rome American Cemetery and Memorial in Nettuno, Italy. His name is also engraved on the headstone of his wife’s grave at Arlington National Cemetery, which notes the date of his presumed death and includes the words "Missing in Action."

== Awards and decorations ==
- Purple Heart
- World War II Victory Medal
- American Campaign Medal
- European-African-Middle Eastern Campaign Medal
- Army Presidential Unit Citation
- Army Good Conduct Medal
- Parachutist Badge

== See also ==
- List of U.S. general officers and flag officers killed in World War II
