= Millard Harmon =

US Army Air Forces general (1888–1945)

Millard Fillmore Harmon Jr.
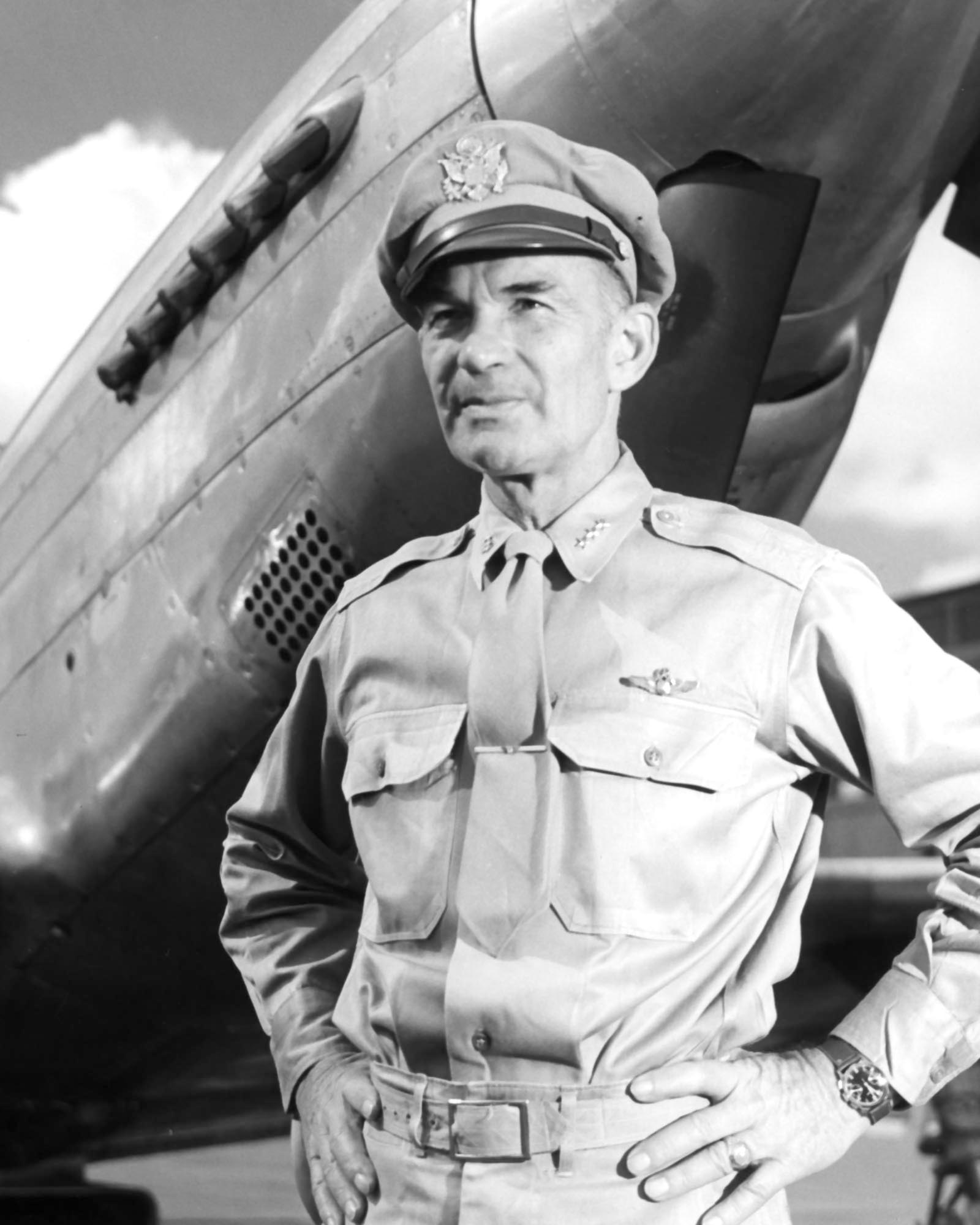
- Born: January 19, 1888; Fort Mason, California, United States
- Died: February 26, 1945 (aged 57); Marshall Islands
- Military career
- Allegiance: United States of America
- Branch: United States Army Air Forces
- Service years: 1912–1945
- Rank: Lieutenant General
- Nickname: "Miff"
- Commands: 20th Pursuit Group; 5th Composite Group; Second Air Force; Air Force Combat Command; US Army Forces in the South Pacific Area; Army Forces South Pacific Area; Army Air Forces Pacific Area
- Conflicts: World War I; World War II; Pacific Campaign
- Awards: Army Distinguished Service Medal; Navy Distinguished Service Medal; Croix de Guerre

Millard Fillmore Harmon Jr. (January 19, 1888 – February 26, 1945) was a lieutenant general in the United States Army Air Forces during the Pacific campaign in World War II. He is presumed to have perished in February 1945 when a plane carrying him disappeared during a flight from the Marshall Islands to Hawaii.

Harmon, Frank Maxwell Andrews, Simon Bolivar Buckner Jr. and Lesley J. McNair, all lieutenant generals at the time of their deaths, were the highest-ranking Americans to die in World War II.

== Biography ==
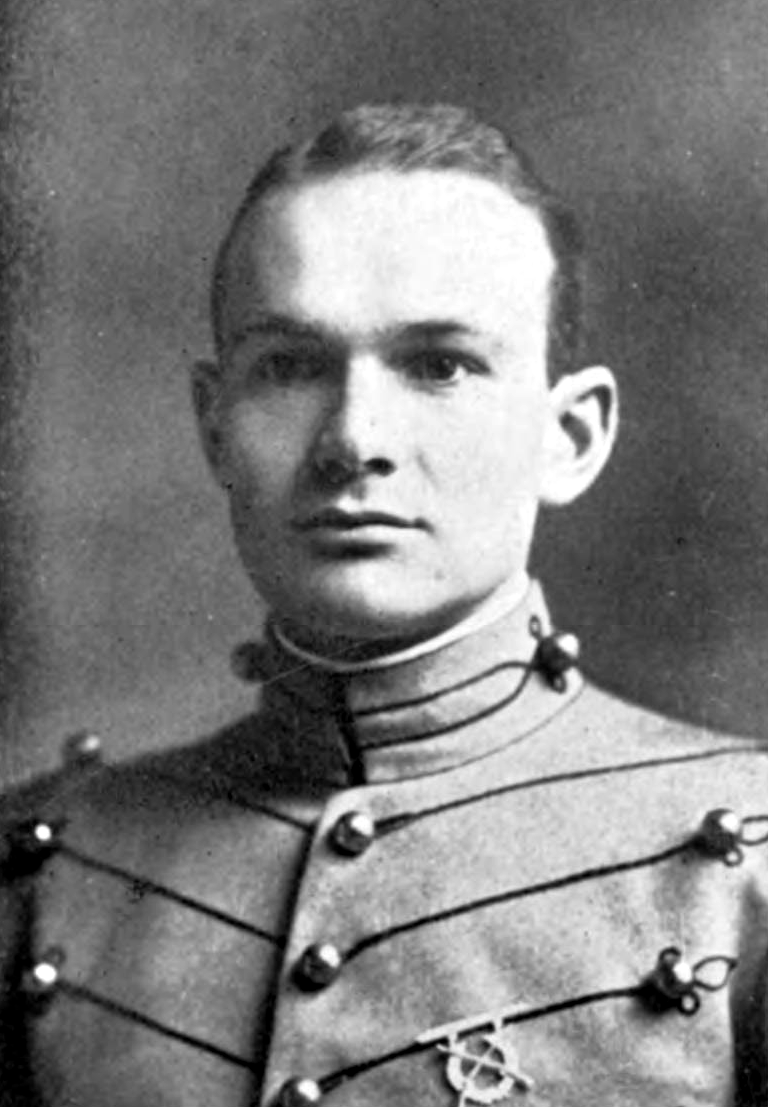
At West Point in 1912

He was born on January 19, 1888, at Fort Mason, California. He was from a military family; his father Millard F. Harmon. Sr. was a colonel, one brother, Hubert R. Harmon, a lieutenant general and another, Kenneth B. Harmon, a colonel. He graduated from the United States Military Academy at West Point in 1912 and was commissioned a second lieutenant in the infantry, serving with the 28th and 9th Infantry Regiments. In 1914 he was ordered to the Philippines, and two years later detailed to the newly organized Aviation Section, U.S. Signal Corps. That year he accompanied the Mexican Punitive Expedition and did aerial patrol work along the border.

Two weeks before the United States entered World War I, Harmon, then a first lieutenant, was on his way to France. There he attended aviation schools in Paris, served at Allied and American headquarters, and was finally attached to the French 13th Group de Combat as a pilot during the Somme defensive, for which he was awarded the Croix de Guerre.

Regarding the U.S. Air Service fields under control of the Training Section in operation on January 20, 1919, Harmon was then a lieutenant colonel and wing commander of the 1st Provisional Wing (Active) at Hazelhurst Field, Mineola, Long Island, New York. Less than three months later, however, Lt. Col. Harmon was the commanding officer at France Field, Cristobal Canal Zone. (On April 16, he had sent a cablegram to the Director Air Service, stating that two of his Army fliers reported lost and delayed by engine trouble, were safe at Bluefields Bluffs.) As of May 29, 1919, Lt. Col. Harmon's 7th Aero Squadron at France Field, Panama Station, was given a reduction in force to 32 officers and 146 regular Army personnel. In March 1920, Lt. Col. Harmon was part of a hunting party operating in the interior of Panama near the Chepo River. The 7th Aero Squadron sent out four flights to locate and communicate with Harmon's party. This involved a great deal of difficulty, and it is unclear whether Harmon's party in the jungle was rescued or returned on their own. At the end of WWI, flying officers who desired to remain in the Air Service to make it a career were permitted to do so, but career commissions in the Regular Army required written examinations, which did not begin until July 7, 1920. After taking this examination, however, Harmon would have to relinquish his (temporary) lieutenant colonel officer rank in order to accept a permanent Regular Army rank of major. This occurred sometime in the four-month period between August 5, when he was still reported to be a Lt. Col., and the first week of December 1920, when Maj. Harmon placed first among his fellow officers in pistol shooting competition at France Field. On March 12, 1921, France Field reported that Maj. Harmon was ordered to report back to Washington and leaving by transport ship the last of March. During his time there, Harmon was an avid polo player who organized his France Field polo team in matches against teams from nearby Army bases. Upon his return to Washington in April, he served as a member of the Advisory Board of the Air Service. In April 1927, Maj. Harmon was relieved from duty with the War Department General Staff and assigned to March Field, Riverside, California for duty. When March Field officially reopened as an Air Corps Primary Flying School on November 1, 1927, Maj. Harmon was appointed as a Faculty Board member and listed as Commandant of March Field. On March 10, 1928, Maj. Harmon commanded a formation of DH-4s and flew the California Lieutenant-Governor on a flight to Blythe for the official opening of the new bridge across the Colorado River. During the years of peace, he continued his training, graduating from the Command and General Staff School and the Army War College. He taught military science and tactics at the University of Washington in Seattle, was assigned as an instructor in the Command and General Staff School, and served with the War Department General Staff for two years.

From 1927 to 1930, he was commandant of the Air Corps Primary Flying School at March Field, California, during which time he came into contact with the young men then entering aviation training. In 1930, Maj. Harmon was ordered to report by August 1 to the Commandant of Command and General Staff School, Fort Leavenworth, Kansas, for duty as an instructor. In 1935, Maj. Harmon, commanding the 20th Pursuit Group at Barksdale Field, Louisiana in March, but within the following month was promoted back to Lt. Col. prior to April 6, and was temporarily commanding the 3rd Wing upon the absence of the wing commander. He commanded Barksdale Field and the 20th Pursuit Group for four years. In 1936, as a lieutenant colonel, he went to Hawaii to command Luke Field and the 5th Bombardment Group. In 1938 he returned to the United States to become assistant commandant of the Air Corps Tactical School at Maxwell Field, Alabama. After two years of service there, he was assigned for brief periods to Randolph Field, Texas, and Hamilton Field, California. On October 1, 1940, while he was in command at Randolph Field, he was promoted to brigadier general.

In January 1941, Harmon was sent to the United Kingdom as an air observer — he was already rated a command pilot, combat observer and technical observer — serving in that capacity and as a member of the Harriman Mission until April. On his return to the United States, he was assigned as commanding general of IV Interceptor Command, Fourth Air Force. On July 11, 1942, he was appointed major general, and a week later was placed in command of the Second Air Force, with headquarters at Fort George Wright, Washington. In December of that year he was assigned as acting commanding general of the Air Force Combat Command.

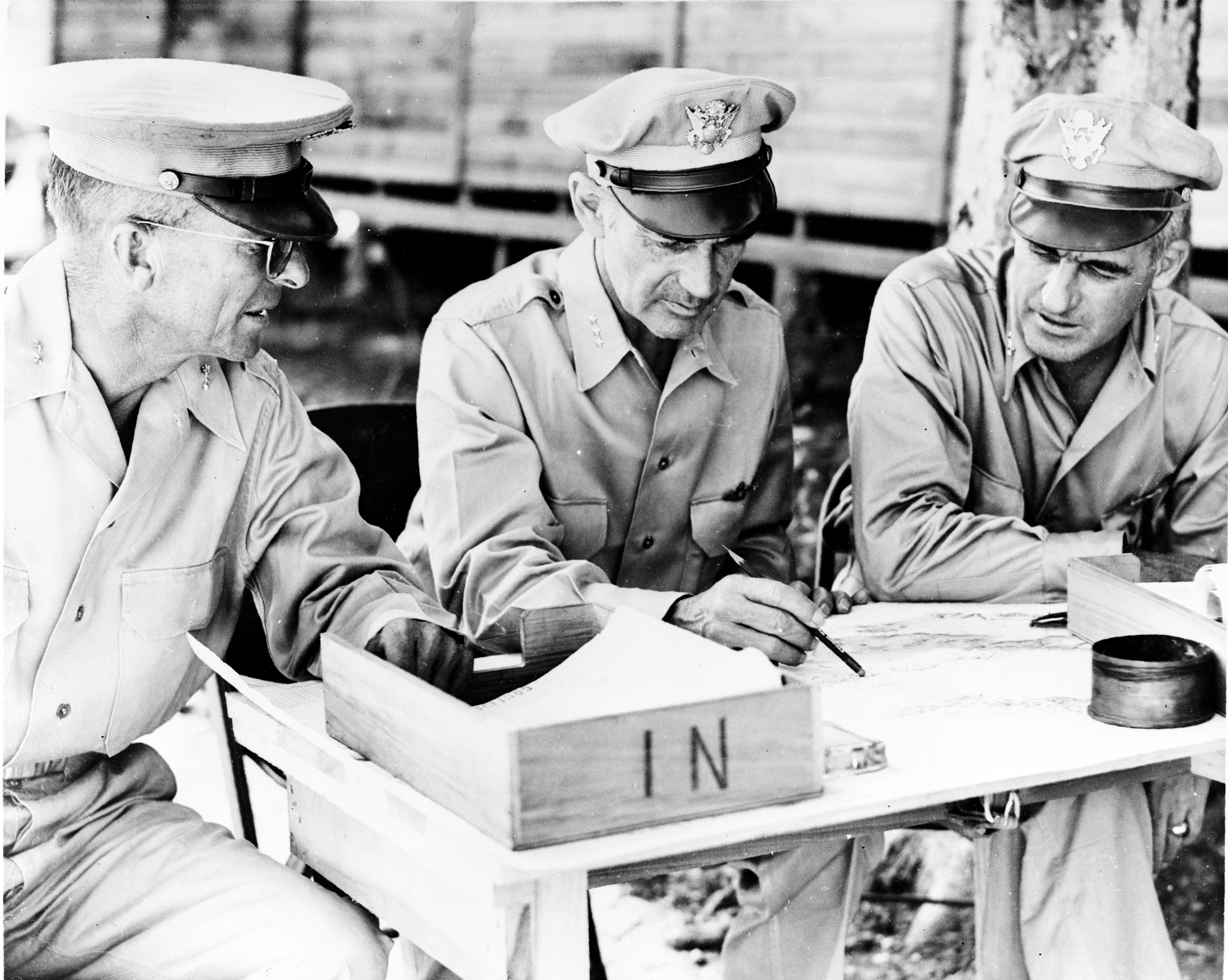
U.S. Army ground and air generals confer with their chief. From left to right: Major General Alexander Patch, Lieutenant General Millard Harmon, and Major General Nathan F. Twining, conferring over a map while serving in the South Pacific, February 1943.

On January 26, 1942, he became Chief of the Air Staff, Army Air Forces. With 30 years combat and command experience as a ground and air officer, General Harmon was well qualified to command Army Forces in an area of increasing strategic importance where air power was to play a dominant role. In July 1942, General Harmon was appointed Commanding General of U.S. Army Forces in the South Pacific Area, an area that was under Navy command. In November, Admiral William Halsey Jr. assumed command of the South Pacific, and the two formed a perfect team. In 1944, at the conclusion of his mission and before he went to another command, Admiral Halsey wrote, "I was particularly fortunate in having Harmon as Commanding General of the Army Forces; his sound advice and wholehearted cooperation in attaining the common goal were outstanding contributions to the joint effort."

On February 2, 1943, Harmon was promoted to lieutenant general. Until September of the following year, he commanded the Army Forces in the South Pacific Area, and then moved to a new command, Army Air Forces, Pacific Ocean Areas (AAFPOA), created under the principle of unity of command in preparation for B-29 Superfortress strategic bombing operations against Japan from the Marianas. At the same time, he was "dual-hatted" as deputy commander of the Twentieth Air Force carrying out those operations, under the command of General Hap Arnold.

Harmon wanted his command of AAFPOA to be more than an administrative, service, and coordinating agency. He lobbied Headquarters AAF for operational control of all USAAF combat operations in the Pacific Ocean Area and partial operational control of the B-29 operations against Japan, from his headquarters on Guam. Wearing his AAFPOA hat, he gained control of all Army and Navy land-based bomber and fighter operations when theater commander Fleet Admiral Chester Nimitz named him commander of Task Force 93 (Strategic Air Force, POA) in December. However, this role brought him into conflict with Arnold's objective of maintaining absolute control of Twentieth Air Force operations independent of any theater commands.

The issue came to a head in February 1945 when Harmon clashed with Major General Curtis E. LeMay, the new commander of the XXI Bomber Command, over command of five long-range fighter groups assigned to the Twentieth Air Force as escorts for strategic bombers, with LeMay prevailing. Harmon objected, contending that the result would be a seriously inefficient use of the forces. On February 25, 1945, a C-87A Liberator Express carrying Harmon, and Brigadier General James R. Andersen, his chief of staff, departed Guam for Washington, D.C. via Kwajalein and Hawaii to resolve the fighter dispute. Their aircraft reached Kwajalein Island safely, but disappeared the next day after taking off for Hawaii. The aircraft was never found and there were no survivors. As Japanese air power had been neutralized in the vicinity of the Marshall Islands for some time, it is highly unlikely that enemy fighters were the cause of loss. Harmon was declared dead on February 27, 1946, one year after he disappeared.

== Legacy ==
Harmon Air Force Base, Guam was named after him. Harmon field was returned to the government of Guam, and has since become an industrial park. The area is still known as Harmon.

== See also ==
- List of people who disappeared mysteriously at sea
