= Tenth United States Army =

American field army (1944–1945)

- Tenth Army Shoulder Insignia
- Active: 20 June 1944 – 15 October 1945
- Country: United States of America
- Allegiance: United States Army
- Branch: Regular Army
- Type: Field army
- Garrison/HQ: Fort Sam Houston, Texas
- Engagements: World War II; Ryukyus

Commanders
- Notable commanders: Simon Bolivar Buckner Jr. Roy Geiger (USMC); Joseph Stilwell; Oliver P. Smith

Insignia
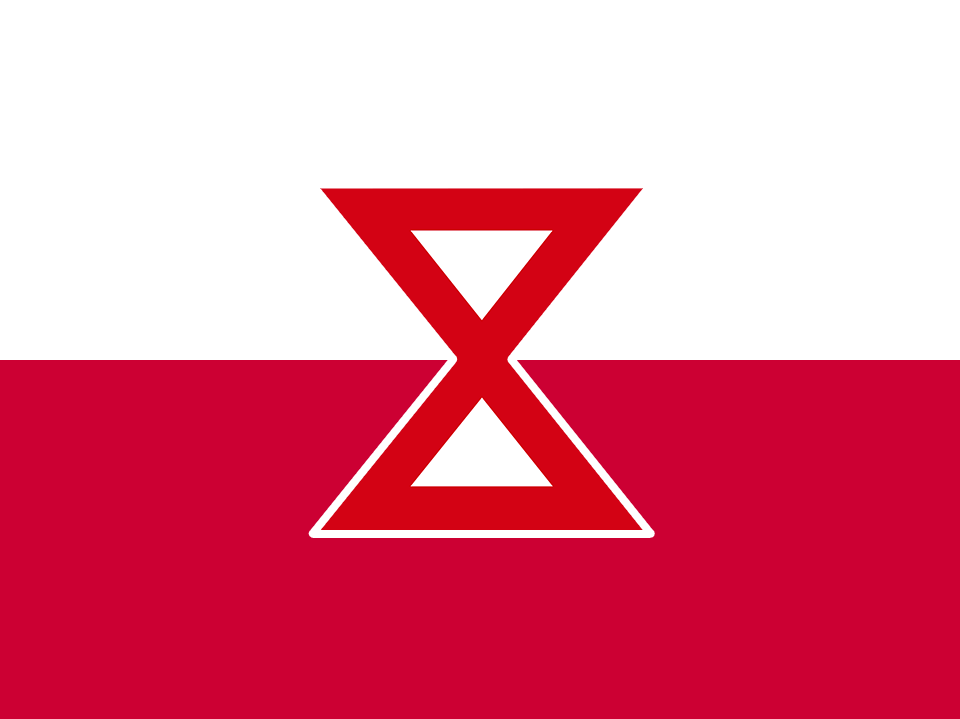
- Flag

The Tenth United States Army was the last army level command established during the Pacific War during World War II, and included divisions from both the U.S. Army and the U.S. Marine Corps.

== History ==
The headquarters of the Tenth Army was formed in June 1944 at Pearl Harbor, Hawaii with the original intent of being the headquarters element for the land forces of the Operation Causeway, the planned invasion of Taiwan (then known as Formosa). Following a conference at Pearl Harbor in July between President Franklin D. Roosevelt, Admiral Chester W. Nimitz and General Douglas MacArthur, it was decided to invade the Philippines instead of Taiwan. As a result, the Tenth Army did not have an operational assignment until the invasion of Okinawa in April 1945.

=== Commanders ===
The Tenth Army was commanded by Lieutenant General Simon Bolivar Buckner Jr. from its activation on 20 June 1944 until he was killed by enemy artillery fire on Okinawa on 18 June 1945. Major General Roy Geiger, USMC assumed temporary command, becoming the first Marine Corps general to ever command a field army, and led the Tenth Army until relieved by General Joseph Stilwell on 23 June. Stilwell commanded the Tenth Army until it was disbanded on 15 October 1945.

=== Battle of Okinawa ===
During the Battle of Okinawa (1 April through 22 June 1945), the Tenth Army consisted of XXIV Corps of the U.S. Army (consisting of the 7th, 27th, 77th and 96th Army infantry divisions) and III Amphibious Corps of the U.S. Marine Corps (consisting of the 1st, 2nd and 6th Marine divisions). The Tenth Army was unique among field armies in that it had its own Tactical Air Force, Tenth Army, a joint Army-Marine formation.

The Army had over 102,000 soldiers (of these 38,000+ were non-divisional artillery, combat support and HQ troops, with another 9,000 service troops), over 88,000 Marines and 18,000 Navy personnel (mostly Seabee and medical personnel). At the start of Battle of Okinawa, Tenth Army had 182,821 men under its command.

In all, Tenth Army suffered 65,631 casualties during the campaign, with 34,736 being suffered by XXIV Corps, 26,724 by III Amphibious Corps, 520 to the tactical air force attached to Tenth Army, 2,636 to the Army garrison forces of Okinawa and Ie Shima, and 1,015 to troops directly under the command of Tenth Army. As noted earlier, one of those casualties was the commander of the Tenth Army himself, killed by an enemy shell burst while visiting a forward position. The day after, a second general, Brigadier General Claudius M. Easley, was killed by machine gun fire. General Joseph Stilwell was selected to succeed General Buckner as commander of the Tenth Army.

Okinawa turned out to be the only campaign that Tenth Army would take part in during World War II. It was earmarked to take part in Operation Coronet, the second phase of the invasion of Japan, but the dropping of the atomic bombs on Hiroshima and Nagasaki, and subsequent Japanese surrender, obviated the need to invade Japan. The Tenth Army was disbanded on 15 October 1945.
