= Ripley's Believe It or Not! (2000 TV series) =

American reality television series (2000–2003)

- Genre: Pseudoarchaeology
- Based on: Ripley's Believe It or Not!
- Presented by: Dean Cain
- Narrated by: Gregory Jbara; Andy Geller
- Country of origin: United States
- Original language: English
- No. of seasons: 4
- No. of episodes: 88

Production
- Executive producers: Erik Nelson (seasons 1–2); Dan Jbara (seasons 3–4)
- Producer: Dean Cain
- Running time: 50 minutes
- Production companies: Ripley Entertainment; Termite Art Productions (2000–2001); Sony Pictures Television (Note: Credited as Columbia TriStar Television (2000–2002).); Angry Dragon Entertainment

Original release
- Network: TBS Superstation
- Release: January 12, 2000 – October 15, 2003

Related
- Ripley's Believe It or Not!: The Animated Series; Ripley's Believe It or Not!

Ripley's Believe It or Not! is an American reality television series hosted by Dean Cain and aired on TBS Superstation from January 12, 2000 to October 15, 2003. It is based on the Ripley's Believe It or Not! franchise.

== Production and broadcast ==
In March 1994, a pilot for The New Ripley's Believe It or Not had been ordered for ABC.

In December 1998, TBS Superstation outbid two broadcast network competitors to purchase the rights from Columbia TriStar Television Distribution for 22 hour-long episodes of The New Ripley's Believe It or Not, to premiere on TBS in January 2000. The series would air weekly, and would be an update of an earlier Ripley's program that aired from 1982 to 1986. The new series was to involve correspondents being sent around the world to report on amazing and unusual subjects. TBS had an option to purchase additional seasons, and had won the rights because it agreed to a full season without seeing a pilot. In June 1999, Erik Nelson was signed on to serve as executive producer for the series. In December 1999, Dean Cain (who at the time was best known to viewers as Clark Kent/Superman on Lois & Clark: The New Adventures of Superman) was hired to host the new series. Cain also served as a producer on the show, alongside Dan Jbara.

The new series, simply titled Ripley's Believe It or Not!, premiered on TBS on January 12, 2000, immediately following the 1999 animated series on France 3, Family Channel, and Fox Family Channel. The series was primarily shot at a 15,000 square-foot Ripley's warehouse in Sylmar, Los Angeles. Most episodes open with an act that is performed in front of a live audience, while the rest of the episode involves Cain introducing various segments, each one for a different subject. Gregory Jbara served as one of the narrators for the different segments. Kelly Packard became a field correspondent in 2002, and would host coverage of events in which people demonstrate their unusual abilities, usually in front of an audience. The show also features such regular elements as "Spot the Not," a weekly trivia segment in which viewers are challenged to pick the claim that is not real and a special "Ripley's Record" commemoration for people who break a world record while appearing on the show. Reruns of the series began airing on The WB in September 2001, and were expected to continue until December 2001. Most episodes ended with Cain going into "Ripley's Vault" to showcase oddities and telling a little backstory about the item in question. The episode would end proper with Cain saying afterwards, "Unbelievable. Believe it".

In early 2003, Sony Pictures Television ordered an 11-episode fourth season. In March 2003, 11 additional episodes were ordered for the fourth season, which aired on Wednesday evenings at 9:00 p.m. For its timeslot, the series was the top-rated program among its target audience of people between the ages of 18–34, 18–49 and 25–54. In September 2003, Sony Pictures announced a trimmed half-hour version of the existing show that would start airing in reruns on local television channels across the United States.

== Home media ==
After the series' cancellation in 2003, Columbia TriStar Home Entertainment (now known as Sony Pictures Home Entertainment) would produce a DVD showing highlights from all 4 seasons known as The Best of Ripley's Believe It or Not!. The show would receive a Philippines counterpart on the GMA Network in 2008, hosted by Chris Tiu.

== Syndication ==
In the United States, hour-long reruns aired on Sci Fi during the 2000s, on Chiller from 2009 to 2015 and again briefly in spring 2017, on Cloo from 2015 to 2017, the Spanish-language network TeleXitos from 2018 to 2023, while the half-hour reruns aired on Decades from 2017 to 2019.

Reruns later began airing on Canada's SPACE station as of 2012.

As of 2026, the show is avalible to stream free on Tubi.

== Episodes ==
=== Series overview ===
Season	Episodes	Originally released	
Season	Episodes	First released	Last released
1	22	January 12, 2000	September 27, 2000
2	22	January 10, 2001	September 19, 2001
3	22	January 9, 2002	October 23, 2002
4	22	January 8, 2003	October 15, 2003

=== Season 1 (2000) ===
No. overall	No. in season	Original release date
1	1	January 12, 2000
Half Woman, The Suspension Club, Etch-A-Sketch Artist, Modern-Day Cannibals, Million-Volt Minister, Maggot Medicine, Cody the Talking Dog, Bendy Man, Vampire Killing Kit
2	2	January 19, 2000
Cut-Away Bungee Stunt, Lizard Man, Bionic Man, Pool Playing Dog, Flame-Throwing Car (an anti-theft device known as "The Blaster"), Human Jack
3	3	January 26, 2000
Pyro Boy, a man who straps firecrackers to himself / Millennium Force / Shark Tourists / Cyborg / Human Calculator / Eyelid Puller / Human Harmonica / Bikini Barber / Kim Peek, a man with an exceptional memory.
4	4	February 2, 2000
A man demonstrates the "Touch of Death", also known as dim mak / Geoff Smith, a man who lived in a buried coffin for 147 days / Bob Munden, a man capable of shooting guns at a rapid speed / A dog that has been trained to sniff out cancer / Tiny Kline glides across Times Square while holding onto a high wire with her teeth (archive footage from the Ripley collection) / The immune systems of Komodo dragons are studied / A man who can write messages on grains of rice / Models who pose in recreations of paintings as part of a show / Spitting fish / A Medieval iron chastity belt, also used as a torture device.
5	5	February 9, 2000
Neil Pearson, a man who fell in his parents' garden and survived impalement by a spike that was being used to support a plant / A man who photographs lightning despite the risks involved in doing so / Vomiting Bird / An archaeologist in search of the Ark of the Covenant visits the Church of Our Lady Mary of Zion in Axum / A woman who believes she is the reincarnation of Nefertiti has undergone numerous plastic surgeries so she can resemble the Egyptian queen / The Oldest Dad (archive footage) / A collection of musical instruments made of used matchsticks / A tattoo artist who can create miniature versions of famous paintings for his customers / Fireproof Man (archive footage) / Parrots who have been taught to identify objects / Camaroon Victory Mask / Kevin Fast, a reverend and strong man who attempts to pull two firetrucks.
6	6	February 16, 2000
Bill Haast, a snake expert who risks his life to obtain snake venom / Clean Escape / Gentle Giant (Robert Wadlow) / Pee Wee Picasso / Chris Robinson, an English man whose dreams often come true, ultimately helps Scotland Yard in several cases / Wonder Dog / Crazy Houses (Pyramid House based on the Pyramid of Cheops, The Skinny House, Missile Silo House) / Light Bulb Swallower (archive footage) / Toast Art Replica (Monet's Olympia) / The Jesus Lizard / Rubber Face Man (archive footage) / The Torture King, a man who regularly lies on a bed of nails, performs a stunt in which he lies on a bed of nails while a car drives over a ramp that is on top of him / A Medieval trap used to trap humans.
7	7	February 23, 2000
Ken Richmond, a strong man who has his ex-wife drop a cannonball on his head to demonstrate his strength, and is later hit by a wrecking ball / The Modern Primitive / A sheep that was raised among dogs and now believes that he is one of them / Coober Pedy, an underground city in Australia / A woman suffering from multiple sclerosis discovers the benefits of bee venom and opens a business specializing in bee venom therapy / Grenade Man / A man who rides the world's smallest bike / Nepal's Kumari goddess / A French restaurant that serves food to customers in complete darkness / A restaurant chef who can pick up tables with his teeth / A restaurant in Palau that serves bats, and a restaurant in China that serves rats.
8	8	March 1, 2000
A martial arts instructor who teaches students how to withstand attacks / A female senior citizen who has become an expert bowling player despite being blind / Thaipusam celebration / Pinhead / Drew Koon, a three-year-old boy who is an automobile expert and can identify any vehicle he sees / Michel Lotito, a man who consumes metal and other objects / A museum with medical devices that were once used to treat mentally ill patients / Odd (Animal) Couple.
9	9	March 8, 2000
A woman who free dives / A man who dives in raw sewage for a living / A large train set collection / Jean-Yves Blondeau, also known as Roller Man, uses a suit made up of roller skates so he can skate around Paris / Leeches are used during surgery to reattach a boy's ear after it was bitten off by a dog / A woman with unusually long fingernails and toenails / A man who stacks bowling balls / The art collection of Honoré Fragonard, consisting of dead bodies / Hungry customers who attempt to win a free steak dinner at The Big Texan Steak Ranch / A seagull that apparently suffers no pain despite having been shot with an arrow, believed to have healed in place to become part of the bird (archive footage) / Umbrella wire-walking woman (archive footage) / Backwards running man (archive footage).
10	10	March 15, 2000
Two female models with small waistlines as a result of wearing corsets / Odd Couple / Fastest Brain / Toddlers who are taught sign language to communicate what they want / A man who decorates toilet seats and now has a large collection of them / A woman suffering from hypertrophic cardiomyopathy undergoes an induced heart attack that helps save her life / Tuff Hedeman, a rodeo bull survivor / A man who sleeps with snakes to tame them / 3D ultrasounds / Iron Maiden body disposal.
11	11	March 22, 2000
Cave jumpers at Mexico's Cave of Swallows / Roy Haynes, an extremely frugal person / A piranha expert who demonstrates that he can enter an aquarium full of the killer fish and survive / Shannon Pole-Summers, a weightlifting teenage girl who demonstrates her ability to pull a pick-up truck full of multiple football players / A man who creates microscopic sculptures / A guide horse being trained to aid blind people / A man who can turn his feet backwards / A man uses hypnothesia (anesthesia via hypnosis) to undergo root canal surgery / Rat Wire Technician / A blind golfer (archive footage) / Daniella Tobar, a woman who lives inside a glass house in Chile as part of a government research project on the subject of privacy.
12	12	March 29, 2000
A man with stretchy skin as the result of Ehlers–Danlos syndrome / An England woman who has a fear of making right turns on the road / A woman is struck by lightning while videotaping a storm / A woman with an exceptional memory / Amy Saunders, a woman who swallows the leg of a chair / A blind dog that has a guide dog / James Hartman, an artist whose tiny sheep sculptures have been left at various landmarks around the world, including the Eiffel Tower / India's Karni Mata Temple, where rats are worshipped / Tennessee's Body Farm / Wim Hof, a man who swims in freezing water.
13	13	April 5, 2000
Grand Master Zhou/ Volcano enthusiasts who attempt to capture up-close images / A military veteran in a wheelchair who suffers from memory problems now has a dog that has been trained to fetch items for him / Sandhogs who work underneath New York City / Two women who operate a business in which they clean up bloody crime scenes at the request of the home owner / A skier who tumbles down a mountain and survives with minimal injuries / A doctor uses a robot to perform open-heart surgery on a man / An ice hotel / John Ssebunya, a village boy in Uganda who was raised by monkeys after the death of his mother / Ice Man.
14	14	August 2, 2000
Richard Sandrak, a seven-year-old bodybuilder / Byron Ferguson, a highly skilled archer / Henry's Réchatin, a man who balances himself on a chair while it sits atop another chair on the rooftop of a tall church building in his hometown of Saint-Étienne. He later performs the same stunt at the Preikestolen cliff in Norway / A dog capable of doing math / An annual crucifixion event in the Philippines / The Gomez family, which suffers from an overgrowth of hair known as hypertrichosis / The Techno Bra, which emits an alert to authorities if it detects a sudden struggle between the wearer and a mugger / Although the velociraptors in the film Jurassic Park (1993) are fictionalized to be larger than their real-life counterparts, a new, larger dinosaur known as Utahraptor – more similar to the film's velociraptors – is discovered shortly before the film's release.
15	15	August 9, 2000
The Enigma and Katzen, a married couple who chose to tattoo their entire bodies / Los Pinos, a small village in Columbia where people must use a zip line to cross a valley below / George A. Blair, an elderly waterskier nicknamed "Banana George" because of his yellow wetsuit / Thai Taoist Ritual / Two contortionists are able to squeeze their bodies into a small glass box / A horse that lives indoors with its owners / A blind man uses echolocation to ride a bicycle and teaches other blind people how to use the ability to get around / Tanya Streeter, a woman who dives into the ocean to explore a sunken ship and is capable of holding her breath for a long period of time.
16	16	August 16, 2000
An escape artist successfully escapes a cage that is dropped out of an airplane / The Museum of the Mummies in Guanajuato, Mexico / Fire chaser / A supermarket in China where customers ride through the store on a slow rollercoaster ride, picking out food items as they go along / A woman in need of a rare kidney transplant meets a man on the Internet, who she later marries and whose kidney happens to be a perfect match / A dog that seeks out and rescues stray cats / A family of stilt walkers / Angel Tolentino, an artist who paints with her breasts / Matt "The Tube" Crowley, who inhales liquids through his nose using a tube, and then has the liquid sucked out.
17	17	August 23, 2000
Sarah Donahue / Snake Head-Millionaire / Bulldozer King / Waterfall Jumper / Top Gun Teen / A woman's life is saved when her pig, LuLu, alerts people that she is having a heart attack / Dancing With the Dead / Gene Pool Harding, a man who creates business suits and other clothing capable of growing grass / Dirt Rider Face Off.
18	18	August 30, 2000
Moab Desert Tragedy / Driving Blind / A man capable of throwing needles hard enough to shatter glass / After a photographer takes pictures of raft riders on a river, homing pigeons are used to transport the film to a facility to be processed in time for the riders to purchase copies / Extreme Unicyclist / Fran Capo, the world's fastest-talking woman / Anaconda Hunter / Face Off / Vine Jumpers.
19	19	September 6, 2000
Body Painter, Beetle Mania, Crash Test Dummy, Sky Walker, Sweat Marathon, Snoring Man, Bamboo Ritual, Bullet Artist, Unbelievable Impalements.
20	20	September 13, 2000
Snake Charmer, Construction Worker King, Secret Lap Top Graffiti, Bug Splat, The Invisibles, Low Walker, Indoor Beach, 55 Seat Bicycle Family, Samoan Tattooing.
21	21	September 20, 2000
A 15-year-old boy is attacked by two great white sharks while surfing, but survives; the incident is accidentally caught on film by a bystander on the nearby beach / A four-month-old puppy loses its right legs after being hit by a vehicle, but grows up and manages to move around without them / Ky Michaelson, a man who had dropped out of high school and pursued his hobby of building and launching rockets. Michaelson attempts to launch a rocket 12 miles into the sky, but is initially unsuccessful; he succeeds on the second attempt several weeks later / A pill-sized camera that is swollen by patients to aid medical doctors / Michael Ri, a basketball player who is the world's tallest man / A mini car that can be folded into a suitcase / A robotic chauffeur / A self-propelled lawnmower (archive footage) / A baseball helmet that uses technology to inform the wearer of how to correctly bat a ball / A taxidermy bear who was found dead by forest rangers was discovered to have died from eating garbage and other items left behind by campers, including dentures and a doll's head.
22	22	September 27, 2000
Jackson Rue, a six-year-old golfer who has gotten four holes-in-one, a feat rarely achieved by professional golfers / Teenaged children in an Amazon tribe must undergo painful rituals to be recognized as adults: boys must insert their hands into mittens full of fire ants, while girls must have each hair plucked from their head / A man who can unscramble anagrams to figure out their true meaning / A robotic bartender in London / A letter and drawing by young Charles M. Schulz describes his dog's ability to eat unusual items without suffering any injuries; the story was later featured in Robert Ripley's cartoon panel in 1937 / Men convert a Volkswagen Bus so it runs on food grease instead of gasoline, and then successfully drive it from Boston to Los Angeles / Bryan Berg, a professional cardstacker, constructs a horizontal house of cards. Berg then lays a wood plank atop it, and has an entire children's baseball team, as well as the coaches, stand on the plank for a total of more than 1,200 pounds, demonstrating the strength of his house of cards / The French city of Verdun, where residents frequently find undetonated grenades from World War I and are occasionally killed by accidentally triggering explosions / In Austria, a clothing chain holds a contest at one of its stores in which shoppers may shop while nude; the first five customers to check out receive a special discount / Joey Strange, who specializes in the act of suspension, has himself flown over the Hollywood Sign with hooks attached into his back, allowing him to dangle from a helicopter / The preserved head of serial killer Peter Kürten, now in the Ripley's collection.

=== Season 2 (2001) ===
No. overall	No. in season	Original release date
23	1	January 10, 2001
A man is stabbed in the head with a large knife, but eventually makes a full recovery / A crocodile expert routinely has the animals swallow a device that monitors their health; while they are tranquilized, he sticks his arm down their throats to retrieve the device after some time has passed / Willie McQueen, who lost his legs in a train accident and later became a football player / After experiencing a false pregnancy, a dog behaves as if cordless telephones are her puppies / Carey Hart successfully performs a 360-degree backflip on a motorcycle / Clothing made from latex that is painted onto the skin and allowed to dry.
24	2	January 17, 2001
Clothes Free Fashion, Motor Soccer, Handwalker, X-Ray Girl, Tennis Racquet Contortionist, Tree Cat, Rescue Rancher, Swimming with Crocs, Bee Man
25	3	January 24, 2001
Hanging Out, Bubble wrap Fashion, Maggot Cheese, Isle of Man, Punkin' Chunkin', Arrowhead, Fingernail Diva, Man Without a Face
26	4	January 31, 2001
Jail Bird Rodeo, Ashes to Art, Three Footed Man, Ultimate Funhouse, Cat on Wheels, Human Shark Bait, Tara Mead, Spiderman, Super Bra
27	5	February 7, 2001
Cobra Charmer / 5 Year Old Marathoner / Toe Fingers / Rope Warrior / Roach Man / Backwards Racing / Modern Day Sword Walker / Long Rifle Sharp Shooter / People come to a Cambodian village in hopes that two cows with healing powers will rub against them; those who do not get rubbed believe they can still be healed by consuming the animals' urine and feces / Brian Zembic, a man who got himself breast implants as part of a bet.
28	6	February 14, 2001
Marc Merger, a paraplegic man who lost the use of his legs after an automobile accident, is implanted with a microchip capable of giving his legs limited movement / A blowgun shooter / Jockeys who race cows / The Museum of Death / A man who uses beetles to clean off the skulls of recently deceased animals / Paul Miller, who has a large mustache / Girls who were born as conjoined twins are successfully separated shortly after birth / A man who kicks a bowling ball up onto his face without injuring himself, and then balances the ball on his head; his variations of the stunt include knives and lit candles sticking out of the ball's finger holes / Origami clothing that can be folded into books / A couple that feed barracudas and moray eels by hand / Lie Busters.
29	7	February 28, 2001
After 25 years, a man discovers that he has a bullet stuck in his skull; on the day he was shot, he mistakenly believed that he had been hit by a falling brick from an adjacent construction site, while nearby men were arguing and were responsible for the bullet, which is left in place as it poses no harm / Rob Lapeen, II, an eight-year-old motorcycle rider who successfully rides his bike over 10 vehicles / Photographers make sharks leap out of the water by using a fake seal to trick the animals into believing it is prey / Hairstylists compete against each other for the most elaborate hairstyles in a contest / A dog that has been trained to play sports / A miniature version of the White House, created by John Zweifel, who began work on it in 1962 and has continued to update it / Chayne Hultgren attaches hooks into his eyelids and uses them to pull his friend – standing on a skateboard – across a bridge / Colleen Fisher and her 73-year-old mother Kelly Nelson, who are both bodybuilders / An Asian hospital that had its employees start wearing rollerblades to decrease patient wait times / Jaime Garcia, a man whose family owned a carnival when he was a boy, performs a stunt in which he walks along the top rims of a moving Ferris wheel, which he used to do at his parents' carnival. With help from his wife and son, Garcia successfully walks along the top of the Ferris wheel as it makes a full turn around / Dean Cain demonstrates thumbcuffs.
30	8	April 4, 2001
Twenty-eight-year-old actor Mario Bosco, who has the appearance of a child because of a condition known as panhypopituitarism / Members of a Muslim religious group who impale themselves with spears to demonstrate their faith / Camel racing in Virginia City, Nevada, the only place in the United States to offer such a sport / Alma and Patrick Gates break the record for loudest automobile speakers when their vehicle, "The Beast", competes in an autosound competition / Betty Lyons, a woman who has her chronic fatigue syndrome and depression cured after traveling to Mexico to undergo trepanation, a surgery that is illegal in the United States as it involves a hole being drilled into the patient's head / A man has trained an army of falcons to hunt other birds at John F. Kennedy International Airport to prevent plane crashes caused by birds getting sucked into the engine / Despite a failed first attempt that partially injures him, skateboarder Danny Way successfully leaps out of a helicopter and uses his skateboard to land on a skate ramp 40 feet below/ A Japanese band that plays one of their songs while hanging upside-down / Beki B, a woman who is in the process of having leopard spots tattooed all over her body to look like a leopard.
31	9	April 11, 2001
John David Bridges, a military aircraft inspector who survived getting sucked into a jet engine and suffered minimal injuries / Robosaurus, a dinosaur robot used to destroy vehicles as part of a show / Gentle Jellyfish / A man restores a 1978 Checker Taxi and turns it into the "Ultimate Taxi" with interior neon lights and music to create a party atmosphere / Snowbie, the world's heaviest and longest cat / Barbara Guerra, a woman who had her arms amputated because of a childhood accident has gone on to live a normal life and raise a child by using her feet as hands / Photographs of a man born with no legs or arms who went on to become a furniture-maker by using his mouth / An artist who could create portraits by typing letters in specific patterns on a typewriter (archive footage) / Lance Ozanix, a man who creates art by vomiting liquids onto the canvas / A man successfully demonstrates his electric-proof suit by allowing himself to come into contact with electricity / Human Wishbone / Band / An artist who creates casts of people's bodies / Songkran, the new year's celebration in Thailand that includes water fights.
32	10	April 18, 2001
Sailor Surgeon / Backwards Biker / A man has organized specific types of bugs along his house's exterior to keep out other bugs, and allows frogs to roam inside so they can eat any bugs that do get in / Mike Seipel, a barefoot water skier, successfully performs a stunt in which he water skis on his hands while a woman rests on his back / log riding in Japan / JC and the Ball / Pop Eye / Iguana Fan / Spy Cam / Strongman
33	11	April 25, 2001
Skull of Steel, Blind Goalie, Coffin Furniture, Cow Jumping, Monster Motorcycle Truck, Electric Cooker, Hula Hooper, Cat Man
34	12	July 11, 2001
Homemade Jet, Quad Walker, Scuba Diving Dog, Well Racing, Tumor Woman, Flame-Throwing Car, Clothes Pin Man, Mile High Bungee, Tattoo Lady, 11 O'Clock Nudes: Episode viewership: 2.9 million.
35	13	July 18, 2001
Ice Sculptures / Eye Periscope / Motorbike Bath / Knife Dog / Egg Parka / Living With Mummies / One Arm Bandits / Egg Man / A rocket-powered street luge board / John Gardner, a man who allows women to sit on his lap, holds the world record for the most lap sittings / Runway models wear clothing made from chocolate and from M&M's.
36	14	July 25, 2001
Jonas Scott, a factory worker who was exposed to industrial chemicals that destroyed his stomach and esophagus, was left bed-ridden for years and ate through a feeding tube until doctors lengthened his remaining intestine to allow for consumption of food / Valentino LoSauro, a hairstylist who was inspired by Edward Scissorhands to create clip-on finger blades that allow him to safely slice people's hair at a rapid pace / Mursi women use lip plates to attract men / Real Life Survivor / A man who can stay underwater for a prolonged period of time without oxygen demonstrates his ability at a Ripley's Aquarium / Living With Mummies / A town in Uruguay is covered by large amounts of sea foam / A man who can squirt milk out of his eye / Half Man Mountain Climber / Clothing that is made out of dog fur.
37	15	August 1, 2001
Cynder Moon, who allows electricity to flow through her body / A man lays inside a container with hundreds of scorpions and survives the stunt / Ezra Bias, a pizza delivery man who survived a metal rod that was flung through his windshield and impaled his brain, leaving him with only a paralyzed arm / Greg Kulz, who specializes in glow-in-the-dark tattoos / A house is built upside-down to attract potential buyers to a new housing community (archive footage from 1960) / Face Threading / Rosalia Lombardo, a girl who died in 1920 and has been perfectly preserved, believed to be the result of an embalming technique using arsenic / A man rides his bicycle on the rooftop of a 16-story building / Ron Nicolino, a man who collects women's bras and adds them to his giant ball of bras, which he uses to raise awareness of breast cancer / Pocatello, Idaho, where it is illegal to frown / Nuns in Harlem who attend karate classes in case they need to defend themselves / A Cocker Spaniel that can climb trees like a cat / A ring, invented around the start of the 20th century, can shoot mini bullets.
38	16	August 8, 2001
Jackie Bibby, a professional snake handler, successfully dangles snakes by their tails using only his mouth to hold them. Later, Bibby survives a stunt in which he lays inside a bag that is then filled with 109 snakes, breaking a previous record / White Lightning, the world's fastest electric car, powered by more than 6,000 C batteries / Gunther von Hagens, who invented the human preservation technique known as plastination and has now created Body Worlds, a gallery of preserved bodies / The world's thinnest digital camera, created by Smal / Ice Golf competition in Greenland / Tom Silliman, whose company changes light bulbs located at the top of building spires, is responsible for routinely changing the light bulb at the top of the Empire State Building's spire / Members of an Indonesian tribe cut off their fingers and earlobes when a loved one dies, as a way of remembering them / Shirley Petrich, a 62-year-old woman who was initially unaware that a man had stabbed a knife into her back. Petrich, noticing the man fleeing from her, initially thought she had been punched and continued her walk to a local grocery story without feeling much pain. Petrich returns home without anyone noticing the knife, which would have caused permanent damage or death if it had struck her spinal cord, located an inch away / A dog capable of multiple tricks sets a new jump rope record / Ab-vertising, in which cheerleaders' exposed stomachs are given tattoos that advertise businesses / A man with an unusually long tongue / A West Virginia law that allows for the consumption of road kill, which decreases the amount of clean-up work required by road officials / A torture device known as the "pear," which is heated and then inserted into a person's mouth to burn it.
39	17	August 15, 2001
A man, while laying on barbed wire, has a wood plank placed on top of him to support the weight of several people / Lowrider vehicle-hopping competition / Two men attempt a "parachute bungee-jumping" stunt that backfires, resulting in one of the men miraculously surviving serious injuries to his back that temporarily hindered his ability to walk / An Israeli dentist who performs her own root canal surgery / Lucy Pearson, a woman who turned her hubcap-collecting hobby into a business with over 200,000 hubcaps, earning her the nickname of "Hubcap Queen" / A man and his 14-year-old son race on bicycles in the Iditasport race / A driver climbs off of his motorcycle while driving at a high speed and positions himself behind the vehicle, placing his feet on the road to imitate surfing / In record-setting time, a dojo group demolishes a house using only their hands and feet / A restaurant in China that serves live scorpions / Lisa Hall, a 19-year-old French resident with the world's longest legs, measuring at 49 inches / An early device used to capture witches.
40	18	August 22, 2001
A four-year-old girl in India limbo skates underneath 18 vehicles / A man breaks the record for most skydiving jumps in 24 hours, by performing 500 jumps / Ahad Israfil, a 14-year-old convenience store worker who lost half of his brain and skull after being shot; despite his injuries, he survived and graduated from college / South Africa's Glencoe Baobab, the world's largest baobab tree; its owners converted its hollowed space into a restaurant / A tribe in which the men develop humps at the back of their necks as a result of carrying canoes along their backs / Brummie Stokes, who lost all his toes and some of his fingers after suffering frostbite during a climb on Mount Everest / The ASIMO, a humanoid robot created by Honda / The yearly migration of crabs on Christmas Island, an event in which the animals overtake much of the island's grounds / Tough Guy Race / Parking enforcement officers who wear bikinis.
41	19	August 29, 2001
Ray's Hell, Chimney Sweep, Human Shish-Ka-Bob, Garbage Artist, Ostrich People, Blind Golfer, Floating Fish, Ear Bus, Hot Air Parachute
42	20	September 5, 2001
Fastball Slugger, World's Smallest Runway, Salvage Park, Fetal Surgery, Water Tower Castle, Snake Cure, Biting Black Bird, The Torture King Revisited, Underwater Angels, Parasite Removal
43	21	September 12, 2001
A woman pulls a truck with rope that is attached into her back skin through hooks / SCAD Diving / A woman who creates jewelry with human bones / Special material allows eggs to bounce rather than break when they are dropped from the window of a building (archive footage) / A U.K. man who can still ride his motorcycle despite losing an arm and a leg in a motorcycle accident / People annually travel to an Indian village to swallow guppy fish, believing that it cures asthma / A law that prevents the chewing of gum in Singapore / A man survives a propeller strike and discovers afterward that he has artistic skills / human towers that are regularly constructed in Catalonia / A man who breeds Yorkshire terriers that weigh a pound / A golfer who plays on stilts / A man who eats cockroaches / Playing cards that feature regular people from all over the United States.
44	22	September 19, 2001
Nail in the Head / Underground House / Waterfall Survivor / World's Fastest Painter / Bolivian villagers dig up the skulls of their relatives years after burial and decorate them for good luck / Yamakasi, a French group of men who have trained for years to perform complex parkour movements / Wim Hof stays in a freezer for one hour at a temperature of 35 degrees below zero, wearing only a bathing suit / A man street skis down a hilly road at a record speed of 60 miles per hour / Tina Marie Stoker, a jewelry designer who creates clothing by applying rhinestones to people using a special adhesive / A man who lost his right arm receives a bionic arm / Thousands of people from around the world gather each year in a small California town to moon a passing Amtrak train / A necklace made up of larvae, created by a tribe whose members also sometimes eat the larvae for nourishment.

=== Season 3 (2002) ===
No. overall	No. in season	Original release date
45	1	January 9, 2002
Field correspondent Kelly Packard hosts a live stadium event as spectators watch Claudia Gomez, a woman who shoots a bullseye using a bow and arrow with her feet while standing on her hands / The world's largest skateboard / A man who started a prairie dog removal service by using a vacuum truck to suck them out of the ground; the truck's interior is cushioned to prevent injuries to the animals once they are sucked in, and they are later relocated by government officials / Two men float into the sky using hundreds of balloons / A Paduang woman removes her neck rings for the first time since they were attached to her as a young girl; she quickly decides that she feels more comfortable wearing them, so she has them reattached / A chimpanzee who is a karate expert / After having his penis amputated due to penile cancer, a man has one of his fingers amputated so it can be used to form a new penis, along with other skin from his body; the surgery is a success / A man who regularly swallows his pet snake and regurgitates it without harming himself or the animal / The Helios Prototype, a solar-powered light-weight aircraft / An update on Stalking Cat, who has now had whiskers attached to his face / Jean-Charles Briand, a French designer who has created two-piece bikinis made out of balloons / A shrunken torso created by the Jivaro Indians of Ecuador and considered rare as the heavy torso was usually discarded by the Indians in favor of solely transporting the lighter head to their homeland for shrinking.
46	2	January 16, 2002
Kelly Packard hosts a live-audience event in front of a Ripley's museum in Hollywood, where Matthew Biancaniello consumes a sampling of various items, including fish eyeballs, bull pizzle, rooster testes, cow dung, and leeches / Reno Jaton, a man who wears titanium plating on his stomach so he can be dragged along a straight speedway by a jet car going over 200 miles per hour / As part of a brief and painless operation, farmers create a four-inch, closeable porthole on their cows so they can monitor the animals' digestion and keep them healthy / A vehicle with a large range of electronic features, including a built-in shaver and sensors that automatically fold up the convertible roof when rain occurs (archive footage from 1953) / Kerry McLean, a man who previously created a monocycle, has recently created a new one known as the Rocket Roadster. McLean was caught on tape crashing the Rocket Roadster during a test run, resulting in injuries. After healing, McLean successfully demonstrates the Rocket Roadster / A Romanian village woman who has become locally known for using her tongue to remove objects from people's eyes / Nugget, a Bull Terrier who can skateboard / Christopher Wall, who was born with his heart outside of his body, has multiple operations during his early years to have it successfully put inside the chest / Daniel Browning Smith, the world's most flexible man, capable of fitting himself into luggage containers / Michael Kettman, who manages to spin 25 basketballs simultaneously with the help of a support platform for each spinning ball / Elaine Davidson, who has over 700 piercings / Thunderwear, a type of women's underwear that also works as a concealed weapon holder / A death mask made with the deceased person's skin.
47	3	January 23, 2002
Kelly Packard hosts a live-audience event in front of a Ripley's museum in Hollywood, where strongman Ken Richmond successfully demonstrates his ability to be hit in the stomach by a cannonball / Dirk Auer, who inline skates along a road while being pulled by a helicopter traveling over 75 miles per hour / A U.K. girl named Laura Buxton writes a letter requesting a pen pal and then ties it to a balloon that she sets free. The balloon reaches another girl who is also named Laura Buxton, who lives 140 miles away; both girls, who have other numerous similarities, become friends / A man invents large, soft tires that allow a truck to climb up walls; he also demonstrates his invention by allowing himself to be run over by the tires, without suffering any injuries (archive footage from 1952) / In northern India, people rub cow urine on their face for good luck / Dave Smith, a man whose prosthetic arm helps his occupation as a film stuntman; he demonstrates how by allowing his prosthetic arm to be blown off for a film / A man who has a pet goose that follows him everywhere / 13-year-old Tiffany Yorks, who was born with Mermaid Syndrome, is the first person to survive having her fused legs separated / In the desert on the outskirts of Las Vegas, a couple get married while hanging several feet in the air through hooks attached into their backs / The Toyota Pod, a "mood car" similar to a mood ring as it is capable of changing its exterior color / A man applies bees to a woman's two-piece bikini to create a bee bikini / A California gym that offers a class where people strip their clothes as they exercise / Sawfish snouts that are used as weapons.
48	4	January 30, 2002
Miss Electra, Leech Man, Hiccup Horror, Bouncing Bikes, Cheese Whiz House, Sheep Legs, Flesh Eating Bacteria Survivor, Nail Teeth Puller, World's Biggest Kite, Cricket Girl, Bicycle Tire Clothing, Coconut Armor, Ox Power Truck
49	5	February 6, 2002
Double Harley Pull, Shark Riders, High Speed Wheelie, Pocket Ski Lift, Fiery Serpent, Matchstick Navy, Beak Job, Metal Plate Model, Human Bottle Opener, Bull Putter, Underwater Hairdresser, Cricket Invasion, Garter Belt Camera
50	6	February 13, 2002
Super Skin, Scorpion Eater, Car Tree, House Sewage Snow, Hair Dress, Matchstick Navy, Beak Job, Scuba Diving Cat, Eye Impalement, Chainsaw Couple, Homemade Sub, Leopard Man, Beetle Jewelry, Martyr Head
51	7	February 20, 2002
Rebar Man / Self-Liposuction / Seeing Eye Horse Update / Smallest Skateboarder / Bone Artist / Long Tongued Dog / Amputee Swimmer / A village man in India who performs shows for people by picking up needles with his eyelids / A pole sitting competition held in Hamburg, Germany / Treetop Lumberjacks (archive footage) / A magnet-powered flashlight / An artist who can make pregnant women's stomachs look like objects such as a basketball or a watermelon / Cleavage jeans / A special fork that was used by cannibalistic Fiji villagers to consume human flesh.
52	8	March 6, 2002
Field correspondent Kelly Packard hosts coverage of a game between the Harlem Globetrotters and a school basketball team that is equipped with special jumping shoes / Yevgeny Severin, a forest ranger in Siberia who had his face disfigured from a bear attack, has now received a snap-on face consisting of various artificial pieces / A man who converted a coffin into a driveable vehicle / A man with a spider obsession who lives with his family among thousands of spiders / Dervish Ritual / Griggsville, Illinois, known as the "Purple Martin Capital of the Nation" / A man survives being impaled by a pipe / An Indian man, with his eyelids, lifts heavy objects that are tied to buttons, which he places inside his eyelids / Mobile, Alabama, which has a law against the wearing of stiletto heels / A whale bone / Andy Varipapa, a famous trickshot bowler / Paintings that are created on living people's bodies / Dime Guy / Jesse James' first gun.
53	9	March 13, 2002
Kelly Packard hosts coverage of the world's first inverted human pyramid, created by lifting people through hooks that are placed into their back skin / A baseball game that was arranged by the National Beep Baseball Association for blind people and which uses a beeping ball to aid the players / A hair temple in India, where people come to have their heads shaved by one of the temple's many barbers / Franz Spohn, an artist who creates artwork that is made from gumball candy, including a portrait of Dean Cain / A fire-escape invention that allows building occupants to safely descend from a window; the new invention is quickly rendered obscure when building codes are updated to prevent fire casualties (archive footage) / A pet boa constrictor snake consumes a hot heating pad, believing it to be prey; the snake is saved through an operation to remove the heating pad / A man taking his usual walk along a railroad accidentally gets stuck and is run over by a train, resulting in the amputation of his left arm and right hand; doctors successfully attach his left hand to his right arm / The pilot of a small plane successfully sets a new record relating to g-force / A company that sends cremated ashes into outer space / The world's smallest computer chip, the size of a grain of sand / Sushi and other food at a U.S. restaurant are served on nude female models / The Lavakan pet-washing machine / A tree that appears to have grown around a bighorn sheep's horns after the animal apparently struck the tree, got stuck, and died.
54	10	March 20, 2002
Kelly Packard hosts coverage of a man who successfully uses his shoulder to smash through 20 concrete slabs / Josh Tenge successfully performs a sandboarding backflip / A village in Thailand that began consuming rats to decrease the animals' population / An artist and a farmer work on a corn field to make it in the image of the Mona Lisa painting / A boat car / A man survives being impaled by a tree branch / Joe Jones, a man who can bulge his eyeballs out / a gatling gun that shoots rubber bands / Kurt Osburn, who successfully rode a bicycle from California to Florida while performing a wheelie the entire time / A couple who wear only black-and-white clothing and whose house uses only black and white colors / The world's smallest buffalo, which weighs 400 pounds and is allowed to come inside its owner's house / A remote-control surgery is performed on a woman in France by a doctor in the United States / Soccer tactician contraption used to train players (archive footage) / A psychic who can see people's past and future by looking at their buttocks / A sharp torture device that was used by criminals to destroy the eyes of people who might otherwise have been witnesses to a crime / Spot The Not
55	11	March 27, 2002
Kelly Packard hosts coverage of BMX rider Cory Nastazio as he successfully executes a double back flip / Landon Shuffett, a seven-year-old who is an excellent pool player / Ol Doinyo Laetoli Le Baaba, a Los Angeles man who has modified his body according to foreign cultures, including a lip plate / A cat that lost the legs on one side of its body as the result of an injury is able to get around despite the loss / A man who has made his own dental dentures for years using power tools in his garage. He visits a dentist to prove to Ripley's how well-built his teeth are; the dentist is surprised by the man's high quality work / The Czech Republic's Sedlec Ossuary, which contains thousands of skeletons / A man who extracts bee honey using only his bare hands / Joe Spring, a man who went missing, is later found to have survived eight days inside his crushed car, which crashed off a highway; Spring has no recollection of what led to the accident / Jim Purol – a man who stuffs large quantities of items into his mouth through his ability to briefly dislocate his jaw – successfully stuffs 18 hot dogs into his mouth / A station wagon with amenities such as a stove (archive footage) / A baby in India who was born with a tail is believed by local people to be a god / Ice sculptors create the sculpture of a woman in record time / Porcupinefish were once used as helmets / Spot The Not
56	12	April 3, 2002
Arrow Catch, Four Flip Skier, Blindfold Portraits, Surfing Dog, Knife Massage, Four Limb Writer, Head Bolted to Body, Flying Icicle, Man Without A Face Update, Bikini Slalom, Eight Foot Rifle, Spot The Not
57	13	July 10, 2002
An update on a member of the Gomez family (which suffers from excessive body hair as a result of hypertrichosis), who is now married and expecting a child / A man born with 12 fingers / Balloon Boy / Kelly Packard hosts coverage of a live event on Fremont Street in downtown Las Vegas, where a man swallows sugar and water, then amazes the crowd by regurgitating the sugar in a completely dry state, unaffected by the water / A "Viper vs. Viper" race at a military base between a Dodge Viper and a jet known as "Viper" / Elvis' blue suede shoes / A woman who has trained her cat to eat with utensils / Gator Girl / Spot The Not: Filming in Las Vegas occurred in April 2002.
58	14	July 17, 2002
Playmate Water Challenge, Head Turner, Homemade Roller Coaster, Rotten Meat Eater, Head In The Sand, Motorcycle Disaster, Scooter Nuns, Grand Popsicle- Paw Stand Beagle, The Arm, Spot The Not
59	15	July 24, 2002
Airplane Water Ski, Monkey Siblings, Yo-Yo Kid, Mini Luxury Ship, Wheelman, Anvil Launching, Allergic To Insects, Diving Dog, Armless In Miami Temple Crawler, Mummified Falcon, Electric Clothing, Spot The Not
60	16	July 31, 2002
Kelly Packard hosts coverage of an event on Fremont Street in downtown Las Vegas, where a woman named Tavana successfully glides over the audience on a high wire, holding on only with her teeth; Tiny Kline was the last person to attempt such a stunt, in 1934. Later, Packard unveils to the audience a truck with a large glass display box attached to its back; inside are two body modification experts who are hanging from the ceiling of the box by hooks attached into their skin / A woman with a love for rats has 16 pet rats / Footage of unborn sharks consuming one another for nutrition / A man survives after his small Cessna plane crashes, then survives when the rescue helicopter he is in also crashes / Everybody in a small Thailand village has learned to walk on stilts, to avoid high flood waters / Louie, a chimp who enjoys skateboarding after learning how to do so for the film MVP: Most Vertical Primate / A paper factory worker has eight of his fingers successfully reattached after a factory accident resulted in them being cut off by a large blade / A woman undergoes body binding, an old ritual performed in villages in which women's bodies are wrapped tightly with rope / Dean Cain demonstrates a contact lens that features the design of the American flag / A small remote-controlled boat that pulls water skiers (archive footage from 1962) / An artist who creates sculptures out of butter / Specially designed coffins: one resembles a lion, while another is modeled after a giant Coca-Cola bottle.: Filming in Las Vegas occurred in June 2002.
61	17	August 7, 2002
Rick Smith Jr., who can flick cards at record distances; Kelly Packard hosts a live event on Fremont Street in downtown Las Vegas, where Smith demonstrates his skills / Armless Cello Player / Computer Box Furniture / The Aerocar, a flying automobile (archive footage from 1952) / Jain monks must have their hair plucked out twice a year / Christina Santhouse, an eight-year-old girl who was diagnosed with a rare and deadly brain disease known as Rasmussen's encephalitis. Santhouse's parents choose to have Dr. Ben Carson and a team of surgeons operate to remove the left half of her brain in hopes that she will survive. Santhouse survives and is now a high school student capable of playing sports and engaging in other activities / A couple who lives with nine pigs in their house; some are trained to perform tricks like a dog / Tomas Gomez, a Nicaraguan man whose hand grew to five times its normal size when he was a boy as a result of Elephantiasis / Model Kawni Gilroy has chocolate company Chocolates a la Carte create a life-like miniature candy bar of herself / Houdini Handcuffs, Spot The Not
62	18	August 14, 2002
Kelly Packard hosts a live event on Fremont Street in downtown Las Vegas, where a man consumes food and then sucks it back out of his throat with the use of a special vacuum hose / A giant block of ice that serves as a television with the use of a projector / A man who collects pennies and uses them for art, such as applying them to his van, or making penny clothing / Indian village people who allow themselves to be impaled with spears to demonstrate their religious faith / 14-year-old Derek Jacobs, who is Microsoft's youngest systems engineer, and whose family – nicknamed the Chipsons – has become the first to be implanted with VeriChip identification chips / Magnets made to be swallowed by cows, to restrict movement of dangerous metal objects that cows sometimes consume / A man who dives into a fish aquarium at an aquatic park on a daily basis, so he can clean the fishes' teeth / A man who lost both his legs in a skydiving accident successfully does a skydiving stunt / An Icelandic man manages to drive his custom Jeep across water for more than 100 feet before sinking / Yankee Doodle / A man who legally had his wife preserved after her death and placed in a special building that he had constructed behind his house, where he frequently goes to be with her / A restaurant in Miami named B.E.D., where diners eat food while sitting on a bed, and are given the option of eating while wearing only their underwear / Spurs that are attached to birds during Asian cockfights.
63	19	August 21, 2002
Kelly Packard provides coverage of an event atop a bungee jumping platform on the Las Vegas Strip, where a strongman successfully demonstrates his ability to hold a jumper's bungee cords after she jumps / An update on Marc Merger, a paraplegic man on whom doctors were able to create leg movement with the use of a computer; the man can now walk around his house with the use of a computer program that sends signals to his spinal cord / A man with no legs and in a low-level wheelchair grabs onto the bumpers of buses to help him get around his hometown in Mexico, as the local buses cannot accommodate his wheelchair onboard / Ron Broomfield, a U.K. gnome collector who also dresses like one / Villagers in India who believe they can take over a person's soul by drinking from their skulls after they have died / A man whose arms are torn off because of a mishap involving farm equipment; they are later successfully reattached / Marsh Amphibian / Iron Witch Staff / A rabbit who enjoys sitting in warm water / A girl who was exposed to chemicals and now suffers skin burns whenever she comes into contact with rain or her own tears / A walk-in six-second tanning machine / A 1930s eye massager device that was meant to help vision / Legally Insane.: Filming in Las Vegas occurred in April 2002.
64	20	October 23, 2002
Kelly Packard hosts coverage of a live event on Fremont Street in downtown Las Vegas, where bike rider Jeff Lenosky successfully rides his bike through an obstacle course / A soldier has an un-detonated grenade successfully removed from his leg / A man who can create mini sculptures out of chewing gum / A Rottweiler undergoes several reconstructive surgeries to repair its face after being shot / A Thai drink made with deadly poison from centipedes / Henry Smalls, a man who lost his legs after being hit by a train as a boy, has now become a skilled kendo expert / A farm woman survives after her hair is scalped from her head with a machine / Travel Surfboard / Boat jousting in France (archive footage) / A man survives a demonstration of his rocket-powered snow skis / A cat named Tom and a mouse named Jerry who are friends / A man who broke his leg in a childhood accident can now turn his ankle backwards, which helps him when playing football / People who believe the Blue Lagoon spa, consisting of waste water from a nearby power plant, to be a Fountain of Youth / Human Scrimshaw Skeleton.: Filming in Las Vegas occurred in June 2002.
65	21	October 23, 2002
Kelly Packard covers an event in which Tom Amberry successfully beats his previous record for most free throws in an hour / Luan Degenaar, a man in a wheelchair who was born without biceps or shoulder muscles, manages to pull a vehicle with rope attached to his wheelchair / A three-year-old Indian girl who is a geography expert and can name each U.S. state / The Paris catacombs, where more than six million skeletons are kept / A drink made from ants / Villagers in Cambodia who eat fried tarantulas / A couple who live with more than 300 birds in their house / After six years, an Austrian police officer who lost his hands in a bomb explosion receives a successful double hand transplant from a deceased man / Indian men all manage to ride on the same bicycle by balancing themselves on a platform attached to the bike / Nose plugs for camels / A young kangaroo that survived having an arrow in its neck for weeks before having it removed in a surgery / Motorized Tackle Dummy / Mini statues of people that are created with a scanning machine / Annie Oakley's gun.
66	22	October 16, 2002
Tomatina Festival, Head Hunter, Hot Water Heater Helmet, World's Largest Portrait, Hat Law, Skate Climber, World's Largest Cigar, World's Smallest Woman, Bunnies, Bunnies, Bunnies, Stalacpipe Organ, Denture Swallower, Cat Shot By Arrow, 11 Month Old Swimmer, Ultimate Air, Geep Head, Spot The Not

=== Season 4 (2003) ===
No. overall	No. in season	Original release date
67	1	January 8, 2003
Cockroach Mouth, Speed Stacking, Portable Helicopter, Hair Hunger, Conjoined Twin Sisters, Surfing Cat, Baby Shaq, Bikini Cards, Trial Chair
68	2	January 15, 2003
Record Board Breaker, Homemade Monorail, Clock Tower Tree, Beauty Buffet / Rosemary Jacobs, who has gray skin due to argyria / An alligator that died after consuming 200 golf balls / The Floating Instrument Platform, a research ship capable of sinking itself sideways to stand out of the water in a vertical position / BMX riders Braedon Black and Michael Davis perform a stunt in which they ride their motorcycles beside each other at El Mirage Lake; one of the men then successfully gets onto the other's motorcycle, before getting back on his own, while both vehicles are travelling at 80 miles per hour / Romina, a gorilla who was born with cataracts, undergoes the same kind of operation that humans have as part of a successful attempt to improve her vision to normal / The invention of the Water Skipper watercraft (archive footage from 1956) / Jose Areyana, whose right foot grew to a massive size as a result of gigantism, receives surgery to reduce its size and is now a soccer player / A line of clothing made from the fur of buffalos, who are shaved in the same way as sheep / A humidor made out of an elephant's foot.
69	3	January 22, 2003
Kelly Packard hosts a live audience event in Times Square, where escape artist Michael Griffin successfully frees himself after being tightly wrapped in rope by Gregg Valentino, who has the world's largest biceps / Alexander Karason successfully drives his snowmobile across water for 15 miles before returning safely to land / The PowerPlank, which is the first motorized snowboard and also works on sand / Indian village men regularly bathe themselves in the cremated ashes of recently deceased people / Two men successfully hike up Harney Peak on stilts / A seven-year-old girl's scalp is ripped from her head after her hair gets caught in a nearby ferris wheel; doctors successfully restore the scalp and the girl begins to regrow her hair / Doggles, a type of goggles created for dogs / During World War II, the U.S. military creates a miniature version of Tokyo for surveillance purposes (archive footage from 1945) / When Spike, an elephant at the Calgary Zoo, accidentally breaks part of his tusk, both of them are then fitted with stainless steel crowns / Ed Sweeney, a man who owns an automobile known as the Aerocar, which is capable of flying / A woman who works as an interior house painter, and specializes in using her naked body to create textured patterns / Dean Cain discusses a large shoe belonging to Robert Wadlow, the tallest person in history.
70	4	January 29, 2003
At Lowe's Motor Speedway in North Carolina, Kelly Packard hosts an event in which 57-year-old Roger Riddell successfully jumps a ramp and flies 60 feet over numerous cars while riding backwards on his motorcycle / Aki Ra, who enjoys collecting undetonated land mines in Cambodia that have been left over from war / Josh Campo, a seven-year-old boy who is capable of lifting twice his own bodyweight / A woman saves her horse from euthanization when she has him fitted with the world's first prosthetic leg for a horse / A girl in India who lost her arms and legs after contracting polio can now sew and paint using her mouth / Emma Richards, a woman who has her legs surgically stretched so she can increase her height from 4 feet 7 inches to 5 feet, in order to meet the height requirement to become a flight attendant / With a magnifying glass, Dean Cain has a look at the world's smallest book, created by a German company with a miniature printing press / The British Admiralty tests a floating runway (archive footage from 1945) / Katzen, a woman who is transforming herself into a catwoman with whiskers and tiger stripe tattoos / Maria Gara, a model who poses with snakes to raise awareness about them / Dean Cain discusses a lock of Marilyn Monroe's hair that was snipped by the man who embalmed her; it is now valued at $50,000.
71	5	February 5, 2003
Ermes Zampera, a human cannonball who originally overshot an inflatable device and injured himself, later performs a successful landing as part of a live event hosted by Kelly Packard / Tia Resleure, a woman who specializes in taxidermy that includes dressing up deceased animals, which fill her house / Peter Lee and his wife Sally have created a miniature replica of their hometown, which they built inside their house / Reverend Paul Sinclair, who transports coffins to their burial sites in a specially made hearse side-car attached to his motorcycle / A 14-year-old Indian girl who is only two feet tall as the result of a medical illness, which has also caused her to have fragile bones and elastic skin / A 17-year-old boy survives being impaled by a two-by-four piece of wood from a fence post into which he crashed / After six years, a woman's missing dog is found through a pet microchip / Jerome Abramovitch, who injects his forehead with saline solution to inflate it so he can get reactions from people he passes by / A human-sized dryer that dries off people after they swim at the beach / An artist who paints images on the wings of dead bats.
72	6	February 12, 2003
At the Ripley's Aquarium in Gatlinburg, Tennessee, Kelly Packard hosts a live-audience event as they watch survival expert Mark Hogg consume 1,000 worms / Joseph Odhiambo creates a new Ripley's basketball record / Guruprasad Vanalkar, a man who can create artwork using a typewriter, creates a portrait of Dean Cain / Cowboy Crazy / Sleeps Standing Up / Madina Yusaf, an African village woman whose nose was consumed by a flesh-eating virus; after a failed attempt by Dr. Peter Ayliffe to grow a nose on her arm, Ayliffe uses skin from other parts of her body to form a new nose / Italian firefighters who perform their practice exercises in synchronization with one another (archive footage from 1951) / Two British men capture toads and use their skin to make products with toad leather, as a way of combating the animals' invasive presence / A man who created an electronic cat-door that scans each cat before letting them inside, in order to prevent the cat from bringing in dead animals such as rats / Model Cassie Lane has an outfit painted on her torso and then goes out in public, managing to fool some people into believing she is not topless / Dean Cain discusses a "cone head" skull, which is the result of head binding, a practice that began for young children and was performed because the elongated shape was viewed as beautiful.
73	7	February 19, 2003
Barefoot Ski and Drive, Girls on Nails, Christmas Obsession, Balloon Sculpture, Bird Spit Soup, Flame Haircut, Limbless Lady, 22 Year Old Bomb, Pig Man Farmer, Dog Braces, Leopard Larry, Painted Hands, Human Skull Vase, Spot the Not
74	8	February 26, 2003
Belly Button Bottle Opener, Frisbee Ashes, Matchstick Apartment, Lingerie Shark Dive, Senior Skier, Bone Furniture, Hardware Store Brace, Plane Crasher, Mini Moo, Fastest Barber, Paintball Catcher, Dog Armor
75	9	March 5, 2003
Foil Boarding, Blind Skier, Underwater Bike, Indian Bone Eating Ritual, Fastest Fingers, Gladiator School, Medical Cupping, Instant Banana Peel, Tour Bus Pull, Winky's Rolling Pin, Croc Teeth Dentures, Checkered Man, Record Parasail
76	10	March 12, 2003
Kelly Packard hosts coverage of an event on a closed set, where Hans Moretti has carefully set up several crossbows on stands so that nearly all of them are facing one another. With an apple on his head and a crossbow in his hands, Moretti shoots at one of the crossbow stands, triggering a chain reaction that activates each of the other crossbows, resulting in the final arrow striking the apple / Snowmobile Backflip / Toast Portraits / Puppy Rescue / Carol Tanzi, who decorates rooms using items made of garbage / After a man undergoes abdominal surgery, doctors accidentally leave a 13-inch metal retractor tool inside of him; after weeks of pain, doctors discover the tool and remove it / An inflatable windshield is invented as a replacement for cracked windshields, but is considered obsolete after laws are passed requiring stronger glass (archive footage from 1967) / In Portugal, a doctor connects a cable into the brain of a man who has been blind for 20 years. The man then wears a special pair of glasses with a built-in camera, allowing him to see things in the form of black and white dots / Jim Weir, who has invented an inflatable surfboard / In the 1930s, a farmer found a small creature appearing to be half-pig, half-elephant, which died shortly thereafter and was preserved by the family.
77	11	March 19, 2003
World's Biggest Rubber Band Ball, Skydive Record, Wheelchair Climb, Canal Vaulting, World's Tallest Stilt Walk, Octagon Bike, Naked Bladers, Spot the Not: Initial plans to film the rubber band ball segment were delayed after a helicopter associated with the production crew hit power lines and crashed near Kingman, Arizona, resulting in minor injuries.
78	12	August 6, 2003
Éric Barone, a bicyclist who survives a crash after setting a new bicycle speed record at the Cerro Negro volcano / Noah Gray-Cabey, a skilled seven-year-old pianist / Army troops are safely transported by laying on sleds that are pulled by tanks (archive footage from 1945) / An Indian man who fills his eyes with sand because he believes it helps his vision / A snake handler nearly dies after being bitten on his stomach by a cobra snake, leading to the formation of a hole as a result of the snake's venom / Ripley's holds auditions in Hollywood for the "World's Most Unbelievable Animal"; the winner is a bird that helps his police-officer owner teach children about safety, by doing tricks involving items / A board-breaking contest between two men who slam each board against their forehead to break it / The Dodge Tomahawk concept motorcycle / Naked News, in which anchors report on news stories while nude / The body of a man who died from tuberculosis and was preserved with arsenic, which has slowed the decomposition process.
79	13	August 13, 2003
After extensive practice, skateboarder Bob Burnquist successfully performs a 360-degree loop with the upper portion of the loop ramp missing / Abby Julo, a four-year-old girl who knows the names of each U.S. president and the governors of each U.S. state / Villagers in a Thailand village regularly search through buffalo feces to obtain the dung beetles inside, which they then cook and consume / An 11-year-old boy has his cancerous left leg removed, cut shorter, and reattached backwards to remove the tumor / Ripley's hold auditions for the "World's Most Unbelievable Animal" in Florida; the winner is a dog who saved its owner by jumping in front of a bullet / A vehicle with 2,000 cameras attached to it / An electric-powered bicycle (archive footage from 1967) / Snake handlers Jackie Bibby and Tiffany Balusek sit in their own container of rattlesnakes to see who can go the longest before quitting the challenge; Bibby wins, and also makes a new Ripley's record for sitting with the most rattlesnakes / Fossilized dinosaur eggs.
80	14	August 20, 2003
Vertical Plane Stall, Wakeboard Wonder, Toe Cocktail, Boomerang Egg, World's Most Unbelievable Animal, Forward Flip Slam Dunk Challenge, Avalanche Backpack, Howard Hughes Helicopter, Blood Art
81	15	August 27, 2003
Mountain Board Jump, Youngest Sailor, Child Marriage, Nose Bubble, Wacko Jacko Wannabe, World's Most Unbelievable Animal, Jet Helicopter
82	16	September 3, 2003
Pocket Bike Speed Record, Beehive, Nose Pull, Paraglide Hanger, Prosthetic Jaw, World's Most Unbelievable Animal, Giant Web, Pool Shark
83	17	September 10, 2003
Balloon Skywalker, Child Supermodel, World's Largest Lasso, Rain Ritual, Microphone Stand Baby, World's Most Unbelievable Animal
84	18	September 17, 2003
Billboard Human Crazy Straw, Surfing Sisters, Tree Babies, Scorpion Eater, Man With Two Hearts, Worlds Most Unbelievable Animal
85	19	September 24, 2003
Billboard Water Hotel, Extreme Skateboard Kids, Elephant Man Feet, World's Most Unbelievable Animals, Metal Mosquito, Uphill Motorcycle, Wing Hanger
86	20	October 1, 2003
Double Dirt Bike Backflip, Baby Ruth, Jump Rope Unicycle, Reed City, Liver Baby, Inflatable Church, Human Chain Escape, Body Sushi Update
87	21	October 8, 2003
Billboard Lego Man, Thigh Masters, Speed Climbing Kid, Beetle Boy, Scissors In Stomach, World's Most Unbelievable Animals, Toothpaste Collection, Bigger Rubber Band Ball Update
88	22	October 15, 2003
Breath Hold Challenge, World's Tallest Kid, Knife-Throwing Mama, Caffeinated Soap, Head Binding, Acupuncture Darts, USC Student
