= Superhuman =

Humans with powers and abilities exceeding those found in average humans

Superhumans, or superbeings, are humans, humanoids or other beings with abilities and other qualities that exceed those naturally found in humans. These qualities may be acquired through natural ability, self-actualization or technological aids. The related concept of a super race refers to an entire category of beings with the same or varying superhuman characteristics, created from present-day human beings by deploying various means such as eugenics, euthenics, genetic engineering, nanotechnology, and/or brain–computer interfacing to accelerate the process of human evolution.

Throughout history, the discussion of superhuman traits and the idea of the ideal human in physical, mental, or spiritual form has influenced politics, policy, philosophy, science and various social movements, as well as featuring prominently in culture. Groups advocating the deliberate pursuit of superhuman qualities for philosophical, political, or moral reasons are sometimes referred to as superhumanist.

Modern depictions of this have evolved and are shown in superhero fiction or through technologically aided people or cyborgs.

== In philosophy ==
=== Nietzsche ===
The philosopher behind the belief of superhumanism believed in the importance of creating a greater meaning in life through individual betterment.

The Übermensch or "Superman" was postulated in the later writings of Friedrich Nietzsche as a type of supreme, ultra-aristocratic achievement which becomes possible in the transcendence of modernity, morals or nihilism. Nietzsche believed in creating the perfect human, or at least a definition of one, and achieving this perfection through the enhancement of individual and cultural health, creativity, and power, and that to be a successful human one would focus on the realities of our world, rather than the beyond world, or afterlife.

Nietzsche explores the idea of a superhuman in his work Thus Spoke Zarathustra, in which he discusses the reality of humans existing as just that, and their potential to be more, through risks taken to advance humanity. This belief focuses not on a man who is bettering oneself but instead establishes values which create a meaning to life greater than one person, and positively influencing the lives of others with an overarching goal of humanity. These goals help one overcome life's feeling of meaninglessness.

=== Transhumanism ===
In transhumanism and futurology, superhuman abilities are the technological aim either of human enhancement by genetic modification or cybernetic implants or of future superhuman artificial intelligence.

Human enhancement is an attempt to temporarily or permanently overcome the current limitations of the human body through natural or artificial means. Human enhancement may be through the use of technological means to select or alter human characteristics and capacities, whether or not the alteration results in characteristics and capacities that lie beyond the existing human range.

Some bioethicists restrict the term to the non-therapeutic application of specific technologies—neuro-, cyber-, gene- and nano-technologies—to human biology.

According to transhumanist thinkers, a posthuman is a hypothetical future being "whose basic capacities so radically exceed those of present humans as to be no longer unambiguously human by our current standards."

Fictionalized accounts of transhumanism include the characters from the X-Men franchise and cyborgs such as those found in the Ghost in the Shell franchise.

==== Ray Kurzweil ====
In 2005, the inventor and futurist Ray Kurzweil predicted that over a 40-year period between 2005 and 2045, most human beings will gradually evolve into a super race of immortal cyborgs called Transhumans with super-bodies and super-brains (the super brains of the humanoid androids will have greater capacity not only in and of themselves, but also because they will be able to function more efficiently by storing some of their mental capacity in the cloud of the future greatly expanded Internet through brain–computer interfacing) by gradually replacing their biological cells with new cells having a more efficient cellular energy processing system that will be based on nanobots manufactured using nanotechnology. These nanobot based cells will enable those who possess these initially quasi android bodies ("Human body 2.0") to have much greater physical endurance as if they were permanently on steroids, and many Olympic records will be routinely broken. The five senses will be enhanced first by genetic enhancement and then by additional brain–computer interfacing. By about 2040, most humans will have become fully android ("Human body 3.0").

Finally, predicts Kurzweil, by 2045, because of the operation of Moore's law, supercomputers linked together by the Internet will have developed enough memory capacity such that most of the now mostly android human race (except those who do not want to) will be able to upload themselves into the worldwide Internet supercomputer of 2045 and live forever after in virtual reality—an event he calls the Singularity.

Kurzweil predicts that soon after the "Singularity", the worldwide supercomputer will deploy other humanoid androids and robots in the meat world. A space navy of these androids and robots will radiate outward from Earth (by now itself a gigantic worldwide supercomputer, except for extensive areas of the surface of Earth set up as nature reserves for those humans who wanted to remain in their natural state as well as to preserve the plants and animals in their natural ecosystems) on large fleets of interplanetary spaceships that will rocket outward into the Solar System and convert all the matter they encounter into megacomputers made of computronium (such as Jupiter Brains) in order to continually expand the computer capacity of the Solar System and thus create ever more realistic virtual reality and solve ever more complex computer problems. Once the matter of the Solar System has been mostly converted to computer substrate, forming a Matrioshka brain, according to Kurzweil, by about the beginning of the 22nd century, life will then expand outward into interstellar space in all directions, deploying miniature starships (to save on expensive anti matter starship fuel) that will be Von Neumann probes crewed by swarms of nanobots, to colonize the entire Milky Way Galaxy. When these nanobots arrive in a planetary system, the nanobots will be programmed with software to begin converting some of the matter they encounter into more androids and robots. While in the process of doing so, they will continue converting all other matter they encounter not being used to create additional androids and robots into more megacomputers—the androids and robots created by the nanobots will build interplanetary spaceships to fan out into the planetary system and themselves help get this job done. Some of the androids and robots will then settle down in the meat world as immortal colonists on the surfaces of the Matrioshka brains thus constructed (regularly making backup copies of the contents of their brains so they can be reconstructed if they are killed in an accident), while others will upload themselves into the virtual reality based on these Matrioshka brains, keeping their bodies in cryonic storage. Eventually, the entire Galaxy, then the Local group, then the Virgo Supercluster, then the Pisces–Cetus Supercluster Complex and ultimately the entire Universe will be turned into a gigantic megacomputer.

=== Artificial intelligence ===
Superhuman is one of the stages in classification of progress in artificial intelligence where an entity of artificial intelligence performs better than most humans do in a specific task. Examples of where computers have achieved superhuman performance include Backgammon, Bridge, Chess, Reversi, Scrabble, Go and Jeopardy!.

=== Religious connotations ===
As a major defining factor of the superhumanism philosophy, humans are expected to possess traits that are considered to be those of high moral grounds, dignity and intrinsic values. Many people who believe in superhumanism value the importance of independent responsibility in making the world a better, and more moral place. This often means being in, or establishing some sort of spirituality which allows one to follow guidelines and grounds of a moral structure, and achieve a certain level of clarity and purity in their self and their path to righteousness and betterment. Superhumanism is often referred to as a combination between religion and philosophy, which suggests that there should be a correlation between the actions of man, and the patterns of the earth, in which this unity established with God, nature and man can allow for super human feats to become possible.

== In history ==
=== Nazi Germany ===
The Nietzschean notion of bettering one's self as an individual was expanded within the philosophy of Nazism to apply to whole groups and nations. Nazi racialist thinkers proposed perfecting the Aryan race through controlled breeding and coercive eugenics (including the murder of those deemed unfit) as a way of improving their racial stock and purifying their society. They intended to create a herrenvolk (race of masters) wherein the Germanic "Übermenschen" would rule over so-called inferior "untermenschen" such as Slavs and West Asians.

==== Neo-Nazism: Homo Galactica ====
The Neo-Nazi David Myatt advocated in the early 1990s that after the Western Imperium, when a proposed future autocratic state governing all the areas inhabited by the Aryan race is established, a new super-race called Homo Galactica should be created by genetic engineering from the most perfect Aryans, which by then will have themselves been improved through genetic enhancement. This new super race would be genetically engineered to have super brains, super senses, and more delicate hands to be able to travel in starships, which would be sent out to colonize the entire Milky Way Galaxy with the descendants of Aryans.

== Real life examples ==
=== Athletics ===
Many acts performed by elite athletes are seen as superhuman. Elite athletes perform at a level that is perceived as unattainable by normal standards of performance. These are the result of a mixture of performance enhancing drugs, genetics, physical training, and mental conditioning. For example, the highest VO2 max test results ever recorded were from Norwegian cross-country skier, Bjorn Daehlie, who scored a 96 ml/kg/min. Another man, Dean Karnazes ran 50 marathons in 50 days in all 50 states in the United States in 2006. On February 4, 2015, actor and power lifter Hafthor Bjornsson broke a 1000-year-old record by carrying a 650 kilogram (1,433 pound) log on his back for 5 steps.

Outside of athletics, many people have performed superhuman feats. The Blue Angels flight acrobatics team regularly pulls maneuvers equal to 4–6 times the force of gravity (g), with some turns as high as 8g. One man, Greg Poe, is a pilot who was able withstand turns of 12g.

There are also many stories of people lifting extremely heavy objects under extreme stress, known as hysterical strength. These situations are created when abnormal tasks are completed due to the brain's heightened need for achievement.

=== Science ===
One modern day method of achieving above average abilities include performance-enhancing drugs; these include substances such as painkillers, blood boosters, stimulants, and anabolic steroids, but can also encompass substances that are not fully recognized as enhancers such as caffeine, protein supplements, and vitamins. While drugs as a form of achieving superhuman capabilities is a well known concept in fiction, such as films like Limitless and the Marvel Comics character Nuke, in real life the current substances that are known and available do not produce such fantastical abilities. The results from some of these drugs are minimal, and often short term. However, they can still produce detrimental side effects, including many adverse psychological effects. SARMS and DMAA are safer forms to enhance physical performance. Other forms of enhancement include strengthening the material properties of bone by integrating it with titanium foam. More studies are needed to assess the long term effects of these emerging technologies.

Technology can also be used to improve on human sensory and communication abilities as has been shown through experimentation with nervous system implants. In this way humans can take on senses such as ultrasonics for an accurate indication of distance and communicate much more directly between brains.

== In popular culture ==
=== Fiction ===
Speculation about human nature and the possibilities of both human enhancement and future human evolution have made superhumans a popular subject of science fiction. Superhuman abilities are associated with superhero fiction, with Noema writer Shannon Vallor describing the comic book character Superman as “perhaps the best-known English-language articulation of the superhuman idea.”

=== Art ===
In 1979, the British artist Nicholas Treadwell wrote a book entitled Superhumanism, followed by Superhumanism 2 in 1982. Treadwell defined his movement as "the first people's art movement—a movement, first and foremost, inspired by life, as opposed to inspired by art. It is a movement of art by the people, for the people, and about the people. It is about tolerance and human understanding. Initially, a superhumanist work will move you to feel—to laugh, to cry, to shudder, to be overwhelmed with compassion. They do not include any aesthetic gesture to distract from the vivid nature of the image. A superhumanist work will take a down to earth subject, and use original technical means to exaggerate it, achieving an over-the-top impact of its humanist theme". Treadwell used this art movement to emphasize the connection between mundane nature of humans, and the superior characteristics that exist in that simplicity.

=== Documentaries ===
Stan Lee's Superhumans is a television show devoted to finding people around the world who exhibit abilities that exceed normal human capabilities. Daniel Browning Smith, the most flexible man in the world, is an example of a superhuman who travels the world finding physical and mental feats that expand the realm of what humans can do.

Human Body: Pushing the Limits is a Discovery Channel show that explains what happens to people's strength, sight, brainpower, and sensing abilities when placed under extreme stress. These circumstances can lead to short-term superhuman abilities, which allow people to excel in advanced, or impossible tasks.

How to Be Superhuman is a podcast series by Red Bull about people who have gone close to the limits of human endurance. The host Rob Pope, who was described as the "real life Forrest Gump" after running across the United States five times, interviews people who have achieved "superhuman" feats, such as Mark Beaumont, who cycled around the world in 78 days, and Diana Nyad, who completed a 110-mile swim from Cuba to Florida without a shark cage at the age of 64.

== See also ==
- Congenital analgesia
- Divinization (Christian)
- Hysterical strength
- Metahuman
- Mutants in fiction
- Speedster (fiction)
- Superhuman strength
- Superpower (ability)
- Supernatural
- Supersoldier
- Liberal eugenics
- LRP5
- Übermensch
- Posthuman
- Transhumanism
