= Tenge (disambiguation) =

Tenge may refer to:

- Kazakhstani tenge, the currency of Kazakhstan
- Teňňe or tenge, one hundredth of a manat, the currency of Turkmenistan
- A Japanese reading of the sinoxenic term Tianxia (天下)
- Josh Tenge, American sandboarder
