= Stan Lee's Superhumans =

Television series

- Presented by: Stan Lee
- Starring: Daniel Browning Smith
- Narrated by: Daniel Browning Smith
- Composer: Timo Baker
- Country of origin: United States
- Original language: English
- No. of seasons: 3
- No. of episodes: 31

Production
- Running time: 41–44 minutes
- Production company: Off the Fence

Original release
- Network: History
- Release: August 5, 2010 – September 17, 2014

Stan Lee's Superhumans is a documentary television series that debuted from August 5, 2010 to September 17, 2014 on History Channel. It was hosted by Marvel comic book superhero creator Stan Lee and follows contortionist Daniel Browning Smith, "the most flexible man in the world", as he searches the globe for real-life superhumans – people with extraordinary physical or mental abilities.

== Episodes ==
=== Series overview ===
Season	Episodes	Originally released	
Season	Episodes	First released	Last released
1	8	August 5, 2010	September 30, 2010
2	13	October 27, 2011	September 1, 2013
3	10	July 13, 2014	September 17, 2014

=== Season 1 (2010) ===
No. overall	No. in season	Title	Original release date
1	1	"Electro Man"	August 5, 2010
Daniel meets Rajmohan Nair of Kollam, India, who can withstand being shocked by electricity 30 times the amount that can kill an ordinary man; Scott Flansburg of San Diego, a "human calculator" who can perform complex arithmetic in his head; Juan Ruiz of Los Angeles, a blind man who can see the world around him with bat-like echolocation; and Dennis Rogers of Houston, the "strongest man in the world".
2	2	"Killer Punch"	August 12, 2010
Daniel meets Bob Munden of Las Vegas, the fastest and most accurate gunslinger alive; Finland's Timo Kaukonen, whose body can withstand near-boiling temperatures; Shi Yan Ming, a Shaolin monk who defected from China and who takes Bruce Lee's infamous "one-inch punch" to a new level; and Darren Taylor "Professor Splash" of Denver, who can survive a 35-foot belly flop into 1 foot of water.
3	3	"Hammer Head"	August 19, 2010
Daniel meets Dean Karnazes of San Francisco, who can ignore extreme fatigue and ran 50 marathons in 50 states in 50 days; John Ferraro of Boston, whose thick skull can withstand the blow of a sledgehammer; Chris Robinson of Edinburgh, Scotland who believes his dreams can predict the future; and Kenny Muhammad of New York City, "The Human Orchestra", who can mimic complex beatbox rhythms with his mouth.
4	4	"Human Speed Bump"	August 26, 2010
Daniel meets Zamora the Torture King (aka Tim Cridland) of New York City, who skewers himself without feeling any pain or shedding blood; Derek Paravicini of London, England, a blind autistic man who can accurately recreate any piano piece after hearing it once; Jyothi Raj of Chitradurga, India who can scale walls with incredible speed and agility; and Tom Owen of Birmingham, Alabama, the man with the hardest muscles on Earth.
5	5	"Human Wolf"	September 2, 2010
Daniel meets Patrick Musimu, of Bonaire who can free dive to nearly 700 feet and hold his breath for over 8 minutes; Miroslaw Magola of Brighton, England who allegedly exhibits telekinetic powers; Shaun Ellis of Devon, England who lives and communicates with wolves; and Eskil Rønningsbakken from Trondheim, Norway, who performs incredible feats of balance.
6	6	"Human Crash Test Dummy"	September 16, 2010
Daniel meets Isao Machii of Osaka, a modern-day swordsman with such precise sword skills that he can cut a pellet in half; Dr. Norman Gary of Sacramento, California who can summon and control swarms of bees; Steve Santini of Cornwall, Ontario, Canada a fearless escape artist who shows ultimate body control when facing extreme danger; and Rusty Haight of Las Vegas, a daredevil "human crash test dummy" who drives himself into car wrecks at high speed.
7	7	"Rubber Band Man"	September 23, 2010
Daniel meets Tim Friede of Fond du Lac, Wisconsin, a human guinea-pig who allows himself to be bitten by venomous snakes for medical research; Dan Meyer of Hartselle, Alabama, who is proclaimed to be one of the greatest sword swallowers in the world; Garry "Stretch" Turner of London, England whose rare medical condition gives him the World's stretchiest skin; and Yves Rossy of Geneva, Switzerland who flies with a high-tech, jet-powered wing strapped to his back that is controlled by precise movements of his body.
8	8	"Jaw Breaker"	September 30, 2010
Daniel meets martial artist Tom Cameron of Chicago, the "Human Stun Gun" who claims to focus the power of "Chi" to deliver knockdown blows to opponents without touching them; Salim Haini of Marrakesh, Morocco, whose incredible gastronomical fortitude has earned him the title of the "Man Who Eats Anything"; Ron White of Fort Worth, Texas whose super mental focus allows him to memorize and recall complex information quickly, even while distracted; and Greg Poe, a test pilot from Florida who claims he can withstand up to 12g of force.

=== Season 2 (2011–13) ===
No. overall	No. in season	Title	Original release date
9	1	"Unbreakable"	October 27, 2011
10	2	"Shark Master"	November 3, 2011
11	3	"Yo Yo Ninja"	February 28, 2013
12	4	"Super Special"	March 7, 2013
13	5	"Human Shield"	March 14, 2013
14	6	"Steel Face"	March 21, 2013
15	7	"Spider Power"	March 28, 2013
16	8	"Beast Masters"	July 21, 2013
17	9	"Rocket Blader"	July 28, 2013
18	10	"Robo Men"	August 4, 2013
19	11	"Bird Man"	August 18, 2013
20	12	"Supersight"	August 25, 2013
21	13	"Finger of Steel"	September 1, 2013

=== Season 3 (2014) ===
No. overall	No. in season	Title	Original release date
22	1	"Throat of Steel"	July 13, 2014
23	2	"Painproof"	July 20, 2014
24	3	"Human Fireball"	July 30, 2014
25	4	"Powerlifting Pastor"	August 6, 2014
26	5	"Fearproof"	August 10, 2014
27	6	"Rapid Fire"	August 20, 2014
28	7	"Man vs. Beast"	August 24, 2014
29	8	"High Voltage"	September 3, 2014
30	9	"Disc of Death"	September 10, 2014
31	10	"Ultimate Super Team"	September 17, 2014
