= Ahad Israfil =

American gunshot survivor (1972–2019)

- Born: August 23, 1972; Dayton, Ohio, U.S.
- Died: October 18, 2019 (aged 47); Dayton, Ohio, U.S.
- Known for: Survival of gunshot injury to brain

Ahad Israfil (August 23, 1972 – October 18, 2019) was an American man known for his recovery from a gunshot injury that destroyed most of his right cerebral hemisphere.

== Injury ==
In 1987, at age 14, Ahad was shot in the head at work when his employer allegedly knocked a firearm to the floor. After a five-hour operation, doctors were amazed when he attempted to speak.

The bullet destroyed brain tissue and damaged half of his skull, but the skin of his scalp survived. The void in his skull was filled in with silicone by Dr. James Apesos. Repairs to his scalp allowed the regrowth of hair, giving him a fairly normal appearance.

== Life post-injury ==
Ahad used a wheelchair and regained most of his faculties and successfully obtained a degree. He appeared on television programs such as World of Pain (Bravo, UK), and Ripley's Believe it or Not.

Ahad died on October 18, 2019, at Mary Scott Nursing Center.

== See also ==
- Cognitive neuropsychology
- HM (patient)
- Hemispherectomy
- Phineas Gage
- Clive Wearing
