= Ripley's Believe It or Not! (Philippine TV program) =

2008 Philippine television infotainment show

- Genre: Infotainment
- Based on: Ripley's Believe It or Not!
- Presented by: Chris Tiu
- Country of origin: Philippines
- Original language: Tagalog

Production
- Executive producer: Wilma Galvante
- Camera setup: Multiple-camera setup
- Running time: 30 minutes
- Production company: GMA Entertainment TV

Original release
- Network: GMA Network (2008–09); Q (2009)
- Release: August 18, 2008 – September 22, 2010

Ripley's Believe It or Not! is a Philippine television infotainment show broadcast by GMA Network and Q. The show is based on the early 2000s American series of the same name. Hosted by Chris Tiu, it premiered on August 18, 2008. The show concluded on GMA Network on September 22, 2010. The show moved to Q on October 3, 2010.
