= Bob Munden =

American exhibition shooter (1942–2012)

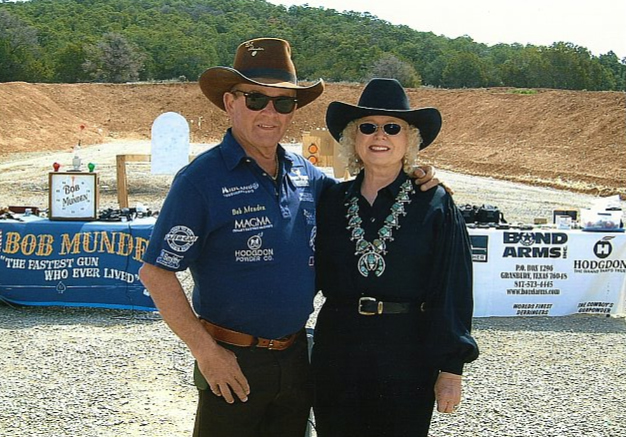
- Munden with his wife in 2005
- Born: Robert W. Munden, Jr. February 8, 1942; Kansas City, Missouri, U.S.
- Died: December 10, 2012 (aged 70); Butte, Montana, U.S.
- Occupations: Exhibition shooter, TV personality, shooting competitor, fast-draw records holder, gunsmith
- Spouse: Becky Lewis Munden

Robert William Munden Jr (February 8, 1942 – December 10, 2012) was an American exhibition shooter who performed with handguns, rifles and shotguns. He is best known for holding 18 world records in the sport of Fast Draw and having the title "Fastest Man with a Gun Who Ever Lived" bestowed upon him by Guinness World Records.

Munden was born in Kansas City, Missouri, United States, and started his shooting career at age 11 in Southern California. Beginning in high school, Munden competed in Jeff Cooper's Big Bear "Leatherslaps" shooting competitions with live ammunition at Big Bear Lake, California, in the 1950s. The Leatherslaps eventually became the South Western Combat Pistol League (SWCPL). When Munden was 16, he placed second in the 1958 Leatherslap using a Colt .45 Single Action borrowed from Cooper. He claimed to have won over 3,500 fast draw trophies.

After taking up exhibition shooting, Munden gave many demonstrations to audiences across the country, once with John Satterwhite. Munden also gave shooting demonstrations on television shows the world over, including Stan Lee's Superhumans on the History Channel, on American Shooter, Shooting USA, Shooting USA's Impossible Shots and Ripley's Believe It or Not among others. Munden was also a custom gunsmith.

== Record controversy ==
The Guinness Book of World Records listed Munden in the 1980 and previous editions as the “Fastest Man with a Gun Who Ever Lived", but they discontinued publishing Munden records in later editions so that the book could be approved as a reference source for school libraries. This led to controversy among younger shooters over the records Munden claimed to hold. Munden's critics have argued that his records are not sufficiently well-documented to be valid and that he currently holds no official Fast Draw world record. Fast Draw includes multiple events, each with its own world record. The record with the shortest time is single-shot open freestyle (using a light-weight gun) held by Ernie Hill of Litchfield Park, Arizona, with a recorded time of .208 seconds. Munden has received skepticism mostly due to the absence of both written evidence of his records and for the absence of his supposed 3,500 trophies.

== Stan Lee's Superhumans ==
At age 68, Munden appeared in Stan Lee's Superhumans. In it, it was found out that his hand is withstanding 10 Gs of force when his weapon is drawn. In a demo, using a Colt .45 single-action revolver, he shot two balloons six feet apart in less than a tenth of a second.

== Death ==
According to his wife, Becky Lewis Munden, Munden started suffering chest pains on December 10, 2012, while driving home to Butte from a Missoula hospital after receiving treatment for a mild heart attack. Miles from a hospital, he told his wife to keep driving before dying shortly afterward.
