= Gregory Jbara =

American actor (born 1961)

- Born: September 28, 1961 (age 65); Westland, Michigan, U.S.
- Education: University of Michigan, Ann Arbor; Juilliard School (BFA)
- Occupation: Actor
- Years active: 1987–present
- Spouse(s): Rebecca Luker (m. 1993, div. 1996); Julie Jbara
- Children: 2
- Website: www.gregoryjbara.com

Gregory Jbara (/dʒəˈbɑːrə/; born September 28, 1961) is an American actor and director. He is known for his roles as Deputy Commissioner Garrett Moore in the CBS police procedural Blue Bloods (2010–2024), Dan O'Keefe in the Fox sitcom Grounded for Life, and for his performance as Jackie Elliot in Billy Elliot the Musical (2009), for which he earned a Tony Award.

== Early life and education ==
Jbara was born in Nankin Township (now Westland), Michigan, the son of an advertising office manager and an insurance claims adjuster. He is of Lebanese and Irish descent. After graduating from Wayne Memorial High School in Wayne, Michigan, Jbara attended the University of Michigan from 1979 to 1981. He majored in Communication Studies and took classes in Theatre and Musical Theatre. He left Michigan to attend the Juilliard School's drama division (1982–1986, Group 15), where he received his Bachelor of Fine Arts degree.

Both of Jbara's brothers also have careers in the entertainment industry. Mike, formerly President and CEO, WEA Corp., is now CEO at MQA. Brother Dan had a career primarily as an unscripted TV show producer. Jbara also has a sister, Judy, who is Chief Supervision Officer at Northwestern Mutual Woodland Hills.

== Career ==
Jbara made his feature film directorial debut with Adam Seidel’s screen adaptation of his hit Off-Broadway play Original Sound now streaming on AppleTV and Prime Video. Jbara portrays Chairman Magnuson in Christopher Nolan's Oppenheimer and enjoyed in 15 seasons as "DCPI Garrett Moore" on the hit CBS police drama Blue Bloods. Other film roles include "Sam Ringo" in Adam Seidel's Alien, Intervention (2023), and "Buck/Hector Scriggles" in Oscar Brill's A Ramble Towards Rain (2023). Jbara originated the role of "Jackie Elliot" (known as "Dad") in the Broadway production of Billy Elliot the Musical, which opened on November 13, 2008. For his portrayal of "Dad," Jbara received the Outer Critics Circle, Drama Desk, and Tony awards for Best Featured Actor in a Musical during the 2008-2009 Broadway awards season. He is the voice of "Pastor Wilson Knox" in the Adventures in Odyssey radio series for Focus On The Family.

On May 5, 2005, Sardi's caricatures of Dirty Rotten Scoundrels stars Butz, Gleason, Jbara and Scott were unveiled in a ceremony hosted by fellow co-star Sara Gettelfinger. (Scoundrels star John Lithgow had already been caricatured at Sardi's.) In a 2008 Grand Rapids Press interview, Jbara (noting the importance of being caricatured at the landmark Broadway restaurant) said, "You don't remember a year later who won the Tonys, but that picture will be in Sardi's for the rest of my life."

Jbara received the BackStageWest Garland 2000 Award for his performance in the West Coast premiere of George Furth's play Precious Sons, co-starring Nora Dunn, Michael Malota, Ginger Williams and Adam Wylie.

In 2006, Jbara received a Special Award from the New England Theatre Conference for his achievement in theatre.

Jbara appeared as TV Land's on-camera spokesperson in eight different spots featuring three generations sitting on a couch: grandpa (William Severs), father/boomer (Jbara) and teenage son (Dylan Kepp). The spots focused, humorously, on the contrasts among those generations and were first shown on TV Land during the TV Land Awards broadcast on April 22, 2007.

Jbara's most prominent TV roles to date have been as NYPD Deputy Commissioner of Public Information Garrett Moore on the CBS drama Blue Bloods (2010–2024) and as Dan O'Keefe in the Fox/WB sitcom Grounded for Life (2002–05).

== Filmography ==
=== Film ===
Year	Title	Role	Notes
1988	The House on Carroll Street	Office Boy	
1988	Crocodile Dundee II	Young Cop	
1991	Married to It	Cafe Waiter	
1995	Jeffrey	Angelique	
1995	Victor/Victoria	Squash Bernstein	TV movie
1996	One Fine Day	Metro Reporter	
1997	In & Out	Walter Brackett	
1999	The Out-of-Towners	Edward	
1999	A Midsummer Night's Dream	Snug	
2000	Cement	Fergus	
2002	The First $20 Million Is Always the Hardest	Hank	
2003	Touch 'Em All McCall	Bobby Mellinger	TV movie
2004	The Sure Hand of God	Rev. Bigbee	
2004	Disney Sing-Along Songs: Home on the Range - Little Patch of Heaven	The Willie Brothers	Video
2004	Beverly Hills S.U.V.	Customer	TV movie
2006	Ira & Abby	Jingle Singer #2	
2006	World Trade Center	Accountant in Karnes Office	
2007	Epic Movie	Mel Gibson	
2008	Out of Step	Jack	Short film
2008	Exit Speed	Jerry Yarbro	
2010	Remember Me	Les Hirsch	
2012	Big Miracle	General Stanton	
2013	Broken City	Post Columnist	
2014	Infiltrators	Eric Volker	
2014	Trust Me	Dean Richards	
2017	The Mice War	General Kan	
2023	Oppenheimer	Senator Warren Magnuson	
2023	Alien Intervention	Sam	
2024	A Ramble Towards Rain	Buck, Hector Scriggles	
2024	Rock and Doris (try to) Write a Movie	Edgar	

=== Television ===
Year	Title	Role	Notes
1987	Newhart	Roy	Episode: Fun with Dick and Joanna
1998	The Closer	Bob Jr.	Episode: Dobbs Takes a Holiday
1998	Cybill	George West	Episode: Cybill Sheridan's Day Off
1998	The Drew Carey Show	Ron	2 episodes
1998	Suddenly Susan	Wallace	Episode: Trash-Test Dummies
1999	Frasier	Bartender	2 episodes
1999-2000	Rocket Power	Various characters	5 episodes
2000	Yes, Dear	Lloyd	Episode: Arm-prins
2000-2001	That's Life	Jo Jo Regosi	2 episodes
2001	Malcolm in the Middle	Mike	Episode: New Neighbors
2001	Ally McBeal	Rev. Compton	Episode: Reach Out and Touch
2002	Crossing Jordan	Stan Benedict	Episode: Bombs Away
2002	Providence	Drew	Episode: Things That Go Bump in the Night
2002-2005	Grounded for Life	Dan O'Keefe	9 episodes
2003	The West Wing	Congressman Segal	Episode: Angel Maintenance
2003	Touched by an Angel	Scott Morgan	Episode: At the End of the Aisle
2003	Without a Trace	Coach Jim Shirley	Episode: Sons and Daughters
2004	The Tracy Morgan Show	Coach	Episode: Coach Tracy
2004	Friends	Gene - 'Pyramid' Contestant	Episode: The One Where the Stripper Cries
2004	Century City	George Hann	Episode: Sweet Child of Mine
2004	As Told by Ginger	Delivery Man	Episode: The Wedding Frame
2005	Higglytown Heroes	The Tree Trimmer Hero	Episode: Kip Gets Swing Fever/Wayne's Pieces of Gold
2006	Conviction	Judge Herman Zimet	Episode: True Love
2006	Twenty Good Years	Gary	Episode: The Crying Game
2007	The Unit	Col. Bright	Episode: Paradise Lost
2007	Come On Over	Director Greg	Episode: Thespians
2008	Monk	Stan Lawrence	Episode: Mr. Monk Gets Lotto Fever
1999-2008	Family Guy	Jonathan, Nazi Guard, Nazi General, Priest	2 episodes
2010	Law & Order	Oscar Newton	Episode: Brilliant Disguise
2010	Glenn Martin, DDS		Episode: Jackie's Get-Witch Quick Scheme
2011	The Cleveland Show	Albert Calleros, Barry	Episode: The Way the Cookie Crumbles
2011	Nurse Jackie	Mr. Finn	Episode: Game On
2011	Treme		Episode: On Your Way Down
2011-2024	Blue Bloods	DCPI Garrett Moore	Recurring role
2008-2011	American Dad!	Plastic Surgeon, Brad, Logan	3 episodes
2014	The Other Hef	Dickie Hefman	Main role
2019-2023	Adventures in Odyssey	Wilson Knox	10 episodes

=== Stage ===
- "Dad" in Billy Elliot the Musical (2008) (originated role)
- "André Thibault" in Dirty Rotten Scoundrels (2005) (originated role)
- "Billy Flynn" in Chicago (revival)
- "Squash (Mr. Bernstein)" in Victor/Victoria (1995) (originated role)
- "Sohovik" in Damn Yankees (1994) (revival; originated role)
- "Bellhop #1/Bootblack" in Born Yesterday (1989) with Ed Asner and Madeline Kahn (Broadway revival)
- "LIFFE Trader, John" in Serious Money (1988) with Alec Baldwin and Kate Nelligan (Jbara's Broadway debut)
- "Alfred P. Doolittle" in My Fair Lady (2013) for the Kennedy Center
- "Mr. Bunder" in the West Coast Premiere of Michael John LaChiusa's play, Little Fish (2007) starring Alice Ripley
- "Vinnie" in the Geffen Playhouse Premier of Neil Simon's Oscar and Felix (update to The Odd Couple)
- "Ike/Bess Truman" in the West Coast Premiere of Michael John LaChiusa's play, First Lady Suite
- "Clark Gable" in The Blank Theatre Company's The Living Room Series presentation of Mark Saltzman's new play, Mr. Shaw Goes To Hollywood
- "Chick Clark" in Wonderful Town (2000) for City Center Encores!
- "Kevin Cartwright" in Privates On Parade (1989) with Jim Dale and Simon Jones
- "Smudge" in Forever Plaid
- "Gunther, Wotan, Hagen, Dwarf, Giant" in Das Barbecü (Goodspeed Opera House, East Haddam, Connecticut)
- "The Frankenstein Monster" in Have I Got A Girl For You! (Jbara's Off-Broadway debut)

== Awards ==
Year	Award	Category	Result
2000	Back Stage West Garland Award		Won
2009	Tony Awards	Best Featured Actor in a Musical	Won
2009	Outer Critics Circle Awards	Outstanding Featured Actor in a Musical	Won
2009	Drama Desk Award	Outstanding Featured Performance in a Musical	Won
