= Dan Jbara =

American television producer

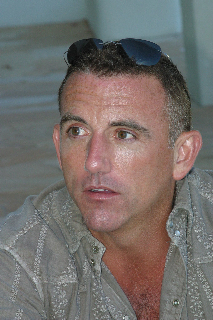
- Died: October 21, 2020; Palm Springs, California, U.S.
- Occupation: Television producer

Dan Jbara (February 22, 1964 – October 21, 2020) was a television and film producer whose career focused primarily on the reality television field in the U.S.. He also executive-produced the 2008 short film thriller Trunk, starring Kyle Gallner and Zachery Bryan.

== Early life and career ==
Jbara grew up in Westland, Michigan. He attended Wayne Memorial High School, Michigan State, and New York University Film School, intending to become a film director. However, his career path took a different turn when he got a job at Fox News and encompassed the reality show genre.

Dan died on October 21, 2020, in Palm Springs, California. He is survived by his mother and three siblings: a sister, Judy, and two brothers, Greg, and Mike.

== Television career ==
- Producer - South Beach Classics - Velocity - originally seen on Discovery Channel (2011)
- Executive Producer - Is It Possible - Discovery Channel (2010)
- Executive Producer - Decision House - MyNetworkTV (2007)
- Executive Producer - The Greg Behrendt Show - Syndicated, from Sony Pictures Television (2006)
- Executive Producer - In Search of the Partridge Family (2004)
- Producer (Supervising, Co-Executive, Executive); Writer - Ripley's Believe It or Not! - TBS (1999–2003)
- Executive Producer - Worst Case Scenarios (TV series) - TBS (2002)
- Co-Executive Producer - AXN-TV - Fox Family Channel (1998–1999)
- Producer - Hard Copy - Paramount Television (1989–1993, 1997–1999)
- Producer - The Mickey Mouse Club - Disney Channel (1993)
- Producer - A Current Affair - Fox (1986–1990)
- Segment Producer - Entertainment Tonight, NBA Entertainment, Special Report TV

Jbara also has segment-produced news shows at various Fox stations.

Jbara worked on the telecasts for the Emmy Awards (1988), Night of 100 Stars II, Liberty Weekend (1986), and the Tony Awards (1985).

== Film career ==
- Executive Producer - Trunk (2008)
- Electric Press Kit Producer - The Last Seduction (1994)
- Electric Press Kit Producer - Blame It on the Bell Boy (1992)

== Awards and nominations ==
- Aldo Award for Outstanding Directing in Fashion Journalism (1994)
- CableACE nomination for Outstanding Children's Program (1994)
