= Dean Karnazes =

American ultramarathon runner (born 1967)

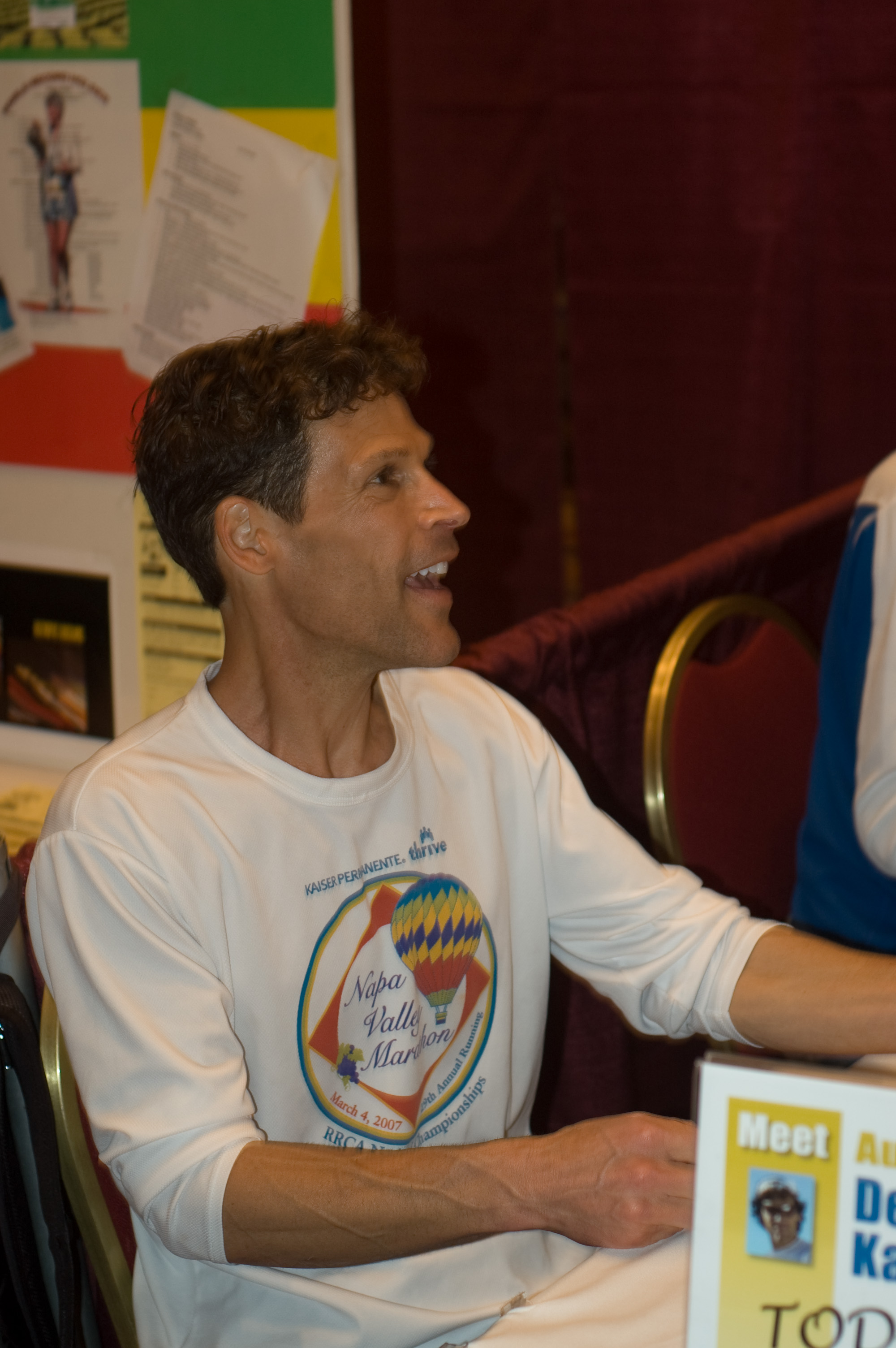
- Karnazes at the 2009 Napa Valley Marathon expo
- Born: Constantine Karnazes; August 23, 1962 (age 64); Inglewood, California, U.S.
- Education: San Clemente High School (1967)
- Alma mater: California Polytechnic State University
- Known for: Ran 350 miles (560 km) in 80 hours and 44 minutes without sleep in 2005
- Height: 1.72 m (5 ft 8 in)
- Website: www.ultramarathonman.com/web/

Dean Karnazes (English: /ˌkɑːrnɛˈzɪs/ car-NEH-zis; born Constantinos Karnazes; August 23, 1962), is an American ultramarathon runner, and author of Ultramarathon Man: Confessions of an All-Night Runner, which details ultra endurance running for the general public.

== Early life ==
Karnazes was born in Inglewood, California to parents of Greek ancestry; Nick and Fran Karnazes. He had two siblings; brother Kraig and a sister, Pary, who died in an automobile accident at the age of 18.

His father worked as a field naturalist for the Orange County Department of Education in 2006. The younger Karnazes brother grew up in Diamond Bar, California and San Clemente, California. In 2006 he said that he remained close to the friends he made at San Clemente High School, which was also attended by both his siblings. Growing up in the city of San Clemente gave him a love of the outdoors, and an appreciation of its small-town feel.

While attending kindergarten, Karnazes began running home from school; he took up running for fun. At first, Karnazes ran direct routes from school to his home. Later, he began to run diversionary routes that would extend his run and take him into uncharted territory. By third grade, he was participating in and organizing short running events with other children. As Karnazes grew older, he began testing his limits: by age eleven he had hiked rim-to-rim across the Grand Canyon and had climbed Mount Whitney, the highest mountain in the contiguous United States; for his 12th birthday, he cycled 40 miles (64 km) to his grandparents' home without telling his parents.

In junior high school, Karnazes met Jack McTavish, a track coach who became Karnazes' mentor and introduced him to the appeal of long-distance running. McTavish's basic running instructions were simple: "Go out hard and finish harder." Using this motto as a basis, that season Karnazes won the 1-mile (1.6 km) California State Long-Distance Championship held on the Mt SAC track. At the end of the race, Coach McTavish commented: "Good work son, how'd it feel?" To this Karnazes replied: "Well, going out hard was the right thing to do. It felt pretty good." The coach replied: "If it felt good, you didn't push hard enough. It's supposed to hurt like hell." The week after the race, Karnazes' father's job was transferred to San Clemente. These were the last comments the coach ever said to Karnazes, who has stated that he lives by these words to this day.

In 1976, as a high school freshman at San Clemente High, Karnazes joined the cross country team under Benner Cummings. Cummings' running theory was that running is about finding your inner peace; his motto was "run with your heart". That season, Karnazes was awarded "Most Inspirational" team member. Karnazes also ran his first endurance event that year, a fundraising run on a track for underprivileged children, finishing in just under six hours and raising a dollar a lap from his sponsors. While most students ran only 10–15 laps around the track, he ran 105, a full marathon. When the cross-country season ended he signed up for the track team but did not get along with the coach. After walking off the track team he then stopped running for fifteen years before rediscovering his love of running at the age of thirty.

== Running highlights and race results ==
Karnazes has completed a number of endurance events, mostly running events, but also a swimming event. Most notable achievements include:

- Ran 350 miles (560 km) in 80 hours and 44 minutes without sleep in 2005
- Completed "The Relay", a 199-mile (320 km) run from Calistoga to Santa Cruz, eleven times
- Ran a marathon to the South Pole in −13 °F (−25 °C) temperatures without snowshoes in 2002
- Ran a marathon in each of the 50 states in 50 consecutive days in 2006

Other athletic achievements include:

- Winner, Badwater Ultramarathon (135 miles (217 km) across Death Valley in 120 °F (49 °C) temperatures), 2004 (with five other top-10 finishes from 2000 to 2008)
- Winner, Vermont Trail 100 Mile Endurance Run, 2006
- Overall Winner, 4 Deserts Race Series, 2008
- American Ultrarunning Team, World Championships, 2005, 2008
- 148 miles (238 km) in 24 hours on a treadmill, 2004
- Eleven-time 100-Mile/1 Day Silver Buckleholder at the Western States Endurance Run (i.e., better than ten twenty-four-hour finishes), 1995–2006
- Ran 3,000 miles (4,800 km) across the United States from Disneyland to New York City in 75 days, running 40 to 50 miles (65 to 80 km) per day, 2011
- Swimming across the San Francisco Bay

Other honors include:

- Competitor magazine Endurance Athlete of the Year Award winner, 2008, 2006, 2005
- ESPN Excellence in Sports Performance Yearly Award winner, "Best Outdoor Athlete", 2007
- Men's Journal, Adventure Hall of Fame, 2007
- Outside magazine, Ultimate Top 10 Outdoor Athletes, 2004

=== 50 marathons in 50 states on 50 consecutive days ===
In 2006, Karnazes embarked on the well-publicized Endurance 50: 50 marathons in 50 states in 50 consecutive days. Beginning with the Lewis and Clark Marathon in St. Louis on September 17, 2006, it finished with the New York City Marathon on November 5. Eight of the 50 races were conventional marathon races. Since marathon races are typically held only on weekends, on the other days Karnazes (accompanied by between one and 50 runners) ran the course of a marathon in each state using the help of the race director and staff of each event to officially run the certified course, but on a different day than the "live" event. (For example, as part of the 50/50/50, Karnazes ran the official course of the Boston Marathon, but not the race itself, which is held in mid-April.)

Karnazes overcame the endurance and logistical difficulties of this goal and finished the final marathon, the NYC Marathon, on the official race day in 3 hours and 30 seconds. He weighed 154 pounds (70 kg) at the start and 153 pounds (69 kg) at the end.

The adventure was the primary subject of film director JB Benna's 2008 film entitled UltraMarathon Man: 50 Marathons, 50 States, 50 Days, which was the first feature film about Karnazes. The film was produced by Journeyfilm and was released in theaters in 2008.

A similar project, undertaken by Sam Thompson to raise money for victims of Hurricane Katrina, was finishing as Karnazes began his project. Thompson ran 51 marathons (all 50 states and D.C.) in 50 days.

== Criticism ==
Karnazes' achievements have been derided among some runners as tainted with hyperbole and that his fame is primarily due to self-promotion in the media, rather than top athletic performances. The president of the American Ultrarunning Association noted that he was "not even in the top 10" of runners. Former elite runner Weldon Johnson said "Dean's biggest accomplishment is not in running, but in marketing." Ultra-marathoner John Morelock defended Karnazes, but also said that Karnazes was "very good, not great. He's not a racer, just a very good performer."

== Other businesses ==
In 1995, Karnazes founded Energy Well Natural Foods in San Francisco and he remains president of the company, now called Good Health Natural Foods. Karnazes is also a regular columnist for Men's Health.

In 2011, Karnazes opened a frozen yogurt shop in San Anselmo, California called U-Top It!

== Media appearances ==
According to his sponsor, Karnazes has been featured on The Today Show, 60 Minutes (2009), The Late Show with David Letterman, CBS News, CNN, ESPN, The Howard Stern Show, NPR's Morning Edition, Late Night with Conan O'Brien, and the BBC. He has also appeared on the cover of Runners' World, Outside, and Wired magazines, and has been featured in TIME, Newsweek, People, GQ, The New York Times, USA TODAY, and The Washington Post, among others.

The "Ultra Marathon Man" episode of Stan Lee's Superhumans documentary television series maintained that Karnazes is able to reduce the build-up of lactic acid over long periods of time. Karnazes also ascribes his endurance feats to an ability to remain under his lactate threshold – his body's ability to clear lactate from his blood and convert it to energy. Among his training tips is to consume sardines for protein.

== Personal life ==
In his memoir, Karnazes explains he was twice expelled for attending school while drunk. Karnazes stated that he quit drinking while at Cal Poly, after the death of his sister.

Karnazes attended California Polytechnic State University at San Luis Obispo, where his major subject was food science technology. He attended graduate school at the same institution, ending up as the class valedictorian. He paid for his education by obtaining scholarships and grants, and by working at a campus health center. Karnazes then went to the University of San Francisco's McLaren School of Business. He holds graduate degrees in Science and Business.

Karnazes met his wife Julie in 9th grade at San Clemente High School. Karnazes' children accompanied their father for much of his run of 50 marathons in 50 states, as they were home-schooled at the time. Karnazes lives in Ross, California.

On August 12, 2022, Karnazes stated in an Instagram video to have been attacked by a coyote during a race in the Marin Headlands. National Park Service rangers noted that his story did not match biologist's understanding of coyote behavior, even among those habituated to humans, and that his injuries appeared to be sustained from a fall, rather than an animal attack.

== Books ==
- The Road to Sparta: Reliving the Ancient Battle and Epic Run that Inspired the World's Greatest Footrace, Rodale (October 25, 2016) ISBN 978-1-60961-474-4
- Ultramarathon Man: Confessions of an All-Night Runner, Tarcher (March 2, 2006) ISBN 978-1-58542-480-1
- 50/50: Secrets I Learned Running 50 Marathons in 50 Days (with Matt Fitzgerald) Grand Central Publishing (August 12, 2009) ISBN 978-0-446-58184-4
- Run: 26.2 Stories of Blisters and Bliss, Rodale (March 1, 2011) ISBN 978-1-60529-279-3. Winner of British Sports Book Awards, Best Publicity Campaign
- A Runner's High: My Life in Motion, Harper One (April 20, 2021) ISBN 9780062955500.
