= Willie McQueen =

American football player (born 1986)

Willie McQueen (born September 6, 1986) is a double amputee from Flint, Michigan who gained substantial renown by starting for his school's football team.

== Biography ==
McQueen was born on September 6, 1986, in Selma, Alabama. In 1994, McQueen lost both of his legs after a train accident in Birmingham, Alabama. While McQueen was playing with two of his cousins, one of his shoelaces became entangled with the undercarriage of a nearby train, and he was dragged behind it for 50 yards before it came to a stop. As a result of the injuries he sustained, both of his legs were removed just below the hip.

When McQueen reached seventh grade at Southwestern Academy in Flint, he decided to try out for his school's football team. Coach Adrian Phillips was initially skeptical, but he agreed to let McQueen try out for the squad after receiving medical clearance and permission from McQueen's mother. The 3'1" teen started out sixth on the depth chart at defensive tackle, but steadily passed the competition until he ultimately became the starter. A wheelchair user off the field, McQueen propelled himself during game situations by walking on his hands. His quickness and low center of gravity made him difficult for offensive players to block, and he also made a name for himself as one of the team's most sure-handed tacklers.

In an article published by the Associated Press, McQueen cited the San Francisco 49ers as his favorite team, and stated the goals of playing for the 49ers and becoming a coach after graduation. After reading about McQueen's story, Ray Carolin, a former United States Secret Service Special agent living in Palm Springs, CA was motivated to touch McQueen's life in a positive way. Carolin reached out to 49er head coach Steve Mariucci, a graduate of Northern Michigan University where Carolin had played football, and together the former Secret Service agent and 49er head coach flew Willie McQueen and his mother to San Francisco as their a guest for the weekend. McQueen met with team players on December 16, 2000, then attended the team's game against the Chicago Bears the next day. Calling McQueen an "inspiration", wide receiver Terrell Owens promised to catch a touchdown for his visitor, then did so and delivered the ball to McQueen after the game. Four years later, former 49ers coach Steve Mariucci brought McQueen as a guest to the practice facility of his new team, the Detroit Lions.

When asked why he would invite and fly a complete stranger and his mother to be his guest in San Francisco Special Agent Carolin said " I was deeply moved that this young man..... after having had his two legs amputated and playing high school football...... I knew he had to be a special kid and I was moved to wanting to encourage him to live his dream..... he may not have been able to play in the NFL player when he grew up but he sure could be an NFL or college coach."

McQueen's story was featured on episode #201 of the television program Ripley's Believe It or Not!, which aired on TBS on September 26, 2001., and on episode #5 of the ESPN2 series Timeless, which aired February 5, 2005. In an interview, Timeless host Dhani Jones cited McQueen's story as one of the two most memorable of the show's first season.

In 2006, McQueen began coaching basketball for an Amateur Athletic Union team in Flint, Michigan.
