= The Miniature White House =

Detailed miniature replica of the White House, in Clermont, Florida

Coordinates: 28.5632°N 81.7438°W

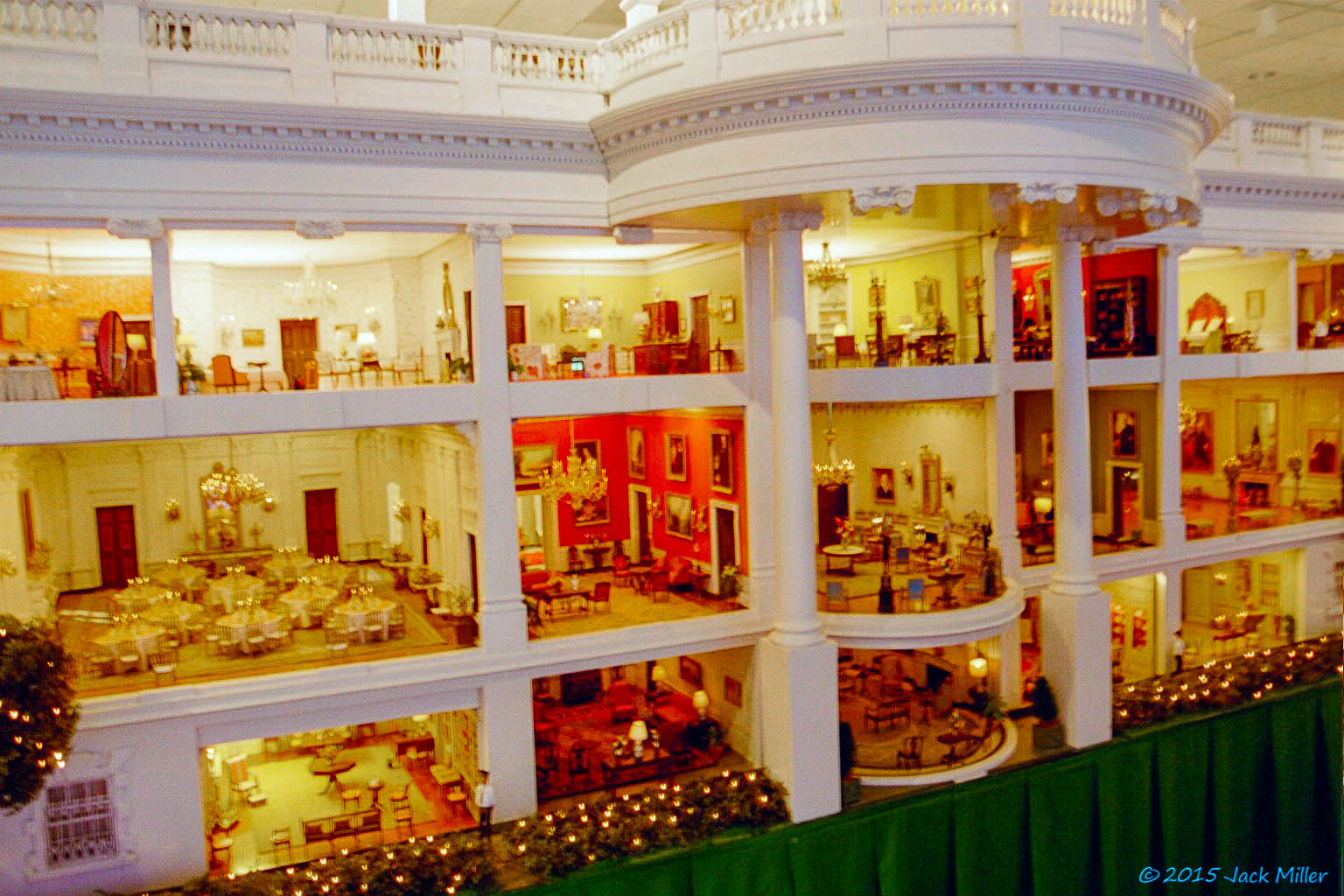
The Miniature White House on display at the Nixon Library in 2015

The Miniature White House is a detailed miniature replica of the White House created by miniaturists John and Jan Zweifel. It is kept at the Zweifels' Presidents Hall of Fame in Clermont, Florida, though portions of it are often displayed elsewhere, including at presidential libraries.

Its construction began in 1962. Built to a 1-inch-to-1-foot scale, it replicates in painstaking detail almost all the rooms in the White House, including the East Wing, West Wing, and the Oval Office.

It has been displayed in every U.S. state. In the 1970s and early 1980s, it was displayed in several foreign countries. In the Netherlands, the replica was attacked by a group of anti-American vandals, who damaged most of the model, but all was eventually repaired.

In 1994, W. W. Norton & Company published The White House in Miniature by Gail Buckland, a book about the model's history and creators that features photographs of all the miniature rooms. A VHS/DVD tour of the replica has also been made.

== See also ==
- Replicas of the White House
