= Josh Tenge =

American sandboarder

Personal information
- Born: December 1978 (age 47) United States
- Height: 5 ft 8 in (1.73 m)
- Weight: 165 lb (75 kg)

Sport
- Country: United States
- Sport: Snowboarding, Sandboarding

Josh Tenge (born December 1978) is a professional sandboarder who has won four world championships and five national titles.

Tenge is a sponsored ( Venomous Sandboards ) professional sandboarding competitor and has set three Guinness World Records, including one for the longest backflip by distance at 44 feet, 10 inches. The record was set on 20 May 2000 in Xwest Huck Fest, Nevada.
