= Daniel Browning Smith =

American contortionist and actor

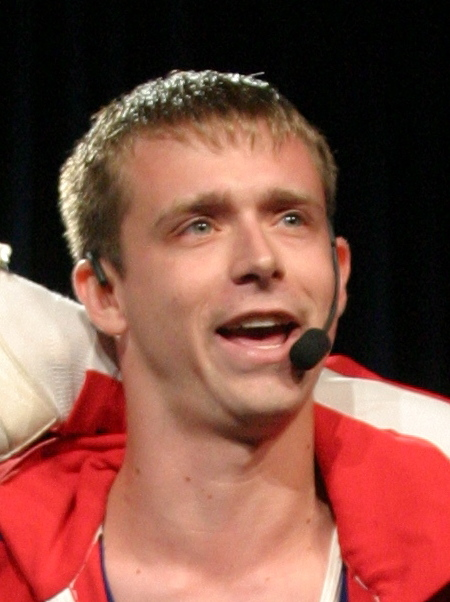
- Smith in 2006
- Born: May 8, 1979 (age 47); Meridian, Mississippi, United States
- Other name: The Rubberboy
- Occupations: Actor, contortionist, television host, comedian, sports entertainer, stuntman
- Years active: 2002–2016

Daniel Browning Smith, also known as The Rubberboy (born May 8, 1979), is an American contortionist, actor, television host, comedian, sports entertainer, and a stuntman, owning a total of seven Guinness World Records. Famous for his extreme abilities as a contortionist, he was renowned for his mastery of frontbending, backbending, and dislocations among his peers. Smith attributes his exceptional flexibility to the genetic condition hypermobile Ehlers–Danlos syndrome (hEDS).

While hEDS is relatively common among contortionists due to tendon and ligament laxity, extreme flexibility often necessitates extensive conditioning and strength training to ensure stability and reduce the risk of long-term injury. This requirement is frequently overlooked or misunderstood, and the misconception is sometimes reinforced by performers who attribute their abilities primarily to innate flexibility.

== Early life ==
Smith was born and raised in Meridian, Mississippi, United States. He has one sister and one brother. He was inspired by contortionists since the age of four, giving him the dream of becoming the world's best one. At this time, Daniel began to jump off the top bunk bed and land in a straddle split, much to the amazement of his family. Later, in his teen years, he began street performing with this technique to attract people's attention. When Smith turned 18, he joined the Bindlestiff Family Cirkus before beginning contortion training under Master Lu Yi at the San Francisco School of Circus Arts.

== Ehlers–Danlos syndrome ==
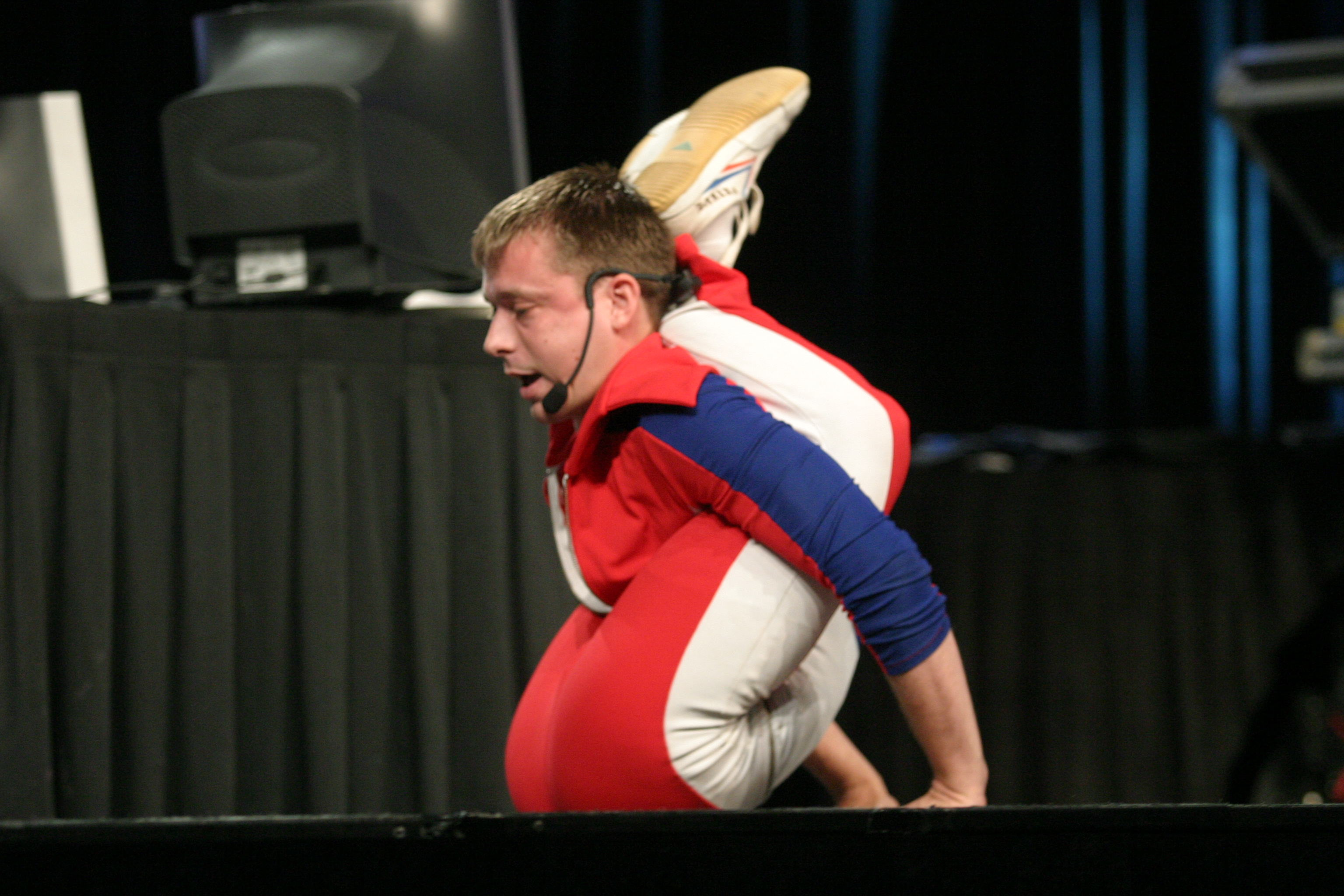
Smith performing a contortionist act at QuakeCon 2006

The remarkable flexibility that Smith possesses is due to a genetic condition known as hypermobile Ehlers–Danlos syndrome or hEDS, one of thirteen types of Ehlers–Danlos syndrome. Those affected by this condition often have extremely mobile joints which are vulnerable to dislocation and skin which is easily bruised. While many people with hEDS have severe muscle and bone pain alongside a range of autonomic nervous system and endocrine problems, Smith experienced only moderate pain for most of his contortion career, but eventually had to give up performing as his condition progressed.

== Television ==
- CSI: NY as Lukas Neiman
- Carnivàle as Rollo the Rubberboy/Boneless Billy Benson
- CSI: Crime Scene Investigation as Sqweegel
- Monk as Danny Chasen
- Stan Lee's Superhumans as Host

== Filmography ==
- 2005 Kiss Kiss Bang Bang as Rubber Boy
- 2008 You Don't Mess with the Zohan as Real Estate Agent
- 2011 Paranormal Activity 3 as stunt
- 2012 Foodfight! as Cheasel T. Weasel (motion capture)
