= Younger season 6 =

Younger
- Season 6
- Cover for digital downloads
- Starring: Sutton Foster; Debi Mazar; Miriam Shor; Nico Tortorella; Hilary Duff; Peter Hermann; Molly Bernard; Charles Michael Davis
- No. of episodes: 12

Release
- Original network: TV Land
- Original release: June 12 – September 4, 2019

Season chronology
- ← Previous; Season 5 Next → Season 7

The sixth season of the American comedy-drama television series Younger was ordered by TV Land in June 2018. It aired from June 12 to September 4, 2019, and revolves around the lead Liza Miller, who has to manage her career in the publishing industry having faked her identity as a younger woman to get her job, whereas her romantic and professional lives are marked by ups and comings. Sutton Foster stars as Miller, with Debi Mazar, Miriam Shor, Nico Tortorella, Hilary Duff, Molly Bernard, Peter Hermann and Charles Michael Davis also returning from the fifth season. The season was produced by Darren Star Productions and Jax Media, with Star serving as showrunner. Younger was renewed for a seventh season on July 24, 2019, making it the longest running original series in the network's history.

== Cast ==
=== Main ===
- Sutton Foster as Liza Miller
- Debi Mazar as Maggie Amato
- Miriam Shor as Diana Trout
- Nico Tortorella as Josh
- Hilary Duff as Kelsey Peters
- Molly Bernard as Lauren Heller
- Peter Hermann as Charles Brooks
- Charles Michael Davis as Zane Anders

=== Recurring ===
- Chris Tardio as Enzo De Luca
- Phoebe Dynevor as Clare
- Laura Benanti as Quinn Tyler
- Annaleigh Ashford as Shelly Rozansky

=== Guest ===
- Michael Urie as Redmond
- Grant Shaud as Bob Katz
- Willa Fitzgerald as Audrey Colbert
- Nicole Ari Parker as Beth
- Becky Ann Baker as Bronwyn Madigan
- Mark Deklin as Cameron Butler
- Cady Huffman as Nurse Maureen
- Lou Taylor Pucci as Travis Jason
- Teddy Coluca as Uncle Joe
- Stephanie DiMaggio as Valentina
- Heidi Armbruster as Michelle
- Maddie Corman as Julie
- Becca Lish as Mrs. Klepper
- Jennifer Westfeldt as Pauline Turner-Brooks
- Oded Fehr as Rafa
- Pat Kiernan as himself
- Delphina Belle as Nicole Brooks
- Jeté Laurence as Bianca Brooks
- Cliff Bemis as Ennis Jacobs
- William Ragsdale as Jeffrey Jacobs
- Carrie St. Louis as Alice Dwyer

== Episodes ==
No. overall	No. in season	Title	Directed by	Written by	Original release date	U.S. viewers (millions)
61	1	"Big Day"	Steven Tsuchida	Teleplay by : Dottie & Eric Zicklin; Story by : Alison Greenberg & Dottie & Eric Zicklin	June 12, 2019	0.64
The initial plan to reveal Liza's actual age as a form of protest against ageism is dismissed by Quinn when published news hint that it was Kelsey who kept a secret relationship with Charles, which Diana believes, forcing Liza to reveal to everyone in Empirical that she is the one who maintained an affair with him. As a result, Diana begins searching for a new job, which leads Kelsey and Liza to perform Dolly Parton's song "9 to 5" with her as a way to convince her to stay. Now as Empirical's publisher, Kelsey takes notice of its financial crisis. After taking a paternity test, Josh learns that he is Clare's baby's father. Charles buys a new bed for Liza's apartment and, after facing his free time, decides to meet with Zane to ideate a project. Charles and Liza say "I love you" to each other for the first time.
62	2	"Flush With Love"	Steven Tsuchida	Don Roos	June 19, 2019	0.58
Josh worries about his ability as a father and Liza reassures him. After a pre-evaluation with a group of women about Claw, Quinn's book, the reactions are negative and Kelsey meets with her to postpone the release; Quinn reveals that she is running for Senate of California, thus making impossible to postpone the publication. Kelsey agrees to publish Claw as planned, with the proviso that in case of commercial failure, Quinn will withdraw from the company. Zane asks "not to be friends" with Kelsey, indicating a romantic relationship. Charles apologizes to Diana for having abruptly left Empirical. Lauren sends Diana and Enzo's love story to a newspaper. Diana and Enzo have an argument after he learns that she still has romantic affection for Charles. She then decides to continue with the publication of their love story as a way to apologize, successfully. Liza and Charles decide to leave their professional lives aside when they are together. During the baby's gender reveal party, Clare goes into labor and gives birth to a girl inside an Uber.
63	3	"The Unusual Suspect"	Brennan Shroff	Grant Sloss	June 26, 2019	0.53
After witnessing the birth of Clare's baby, Maggie develops a fear of vaginas; Lauren introduces her to a help group on the subject and Maggie has a date with Beth, the group's leader. Clare and Josh decide to divorce after they both question the possibility of liking each other again. Kelsey and Liza learn that Quinn bought several editions of Claw and ordered Chinese Twitter bots to leverage the book's success. Millennial receives Audrey Colbert, an accused murderer who becomes a celebrity through a podcast and is willing to publish her truths. Redmond promises exclusivity for Kelsey; however, after the disclosure of Claw's adulterations, Colbert talks with other publishing houses. During a press conference, Quinn is pressured about the book, and her Senate campaign is unveiled by Kelsey. Redmond reveals that a new imprint named Mercury has offered a good proposal to Audrey and the publisher is Zane. Liza then has an epiphany and realizes that Charles has sold one of his properties to help his "secret project" with Zane.
64	4	"An Inside Glob"	Miriam Shor	Alison Brown	July 10, 2019	0.65
Kelsey discovers that Charles is working with Zane at the Mercury publishing house. She screams at Zane and Charles during a meeting with Bronwyn Madigan, an author is who considering leaving Millennial. The video of Kelsey screaming goes viral. Madigan decides to remain at Millennial, but agents from several other authors contact the company wanting to cease contracts and move to Mercury. Due to stress, Kelsey begins to lose several strands of hair. Maggie and Beth's relationship progresses as Josh realizes how present he wants to be in his daughter's life.
65	5	"Stiff Competition"	Peter Lauer	Joe Murphy	July 17, 2019	0.63
Lauren creates an Instagram profile for Gemma, Josh's baby. Both take advantage of the success and influence of the profile to get various products for free. Millennial suffers from another possible publication being taken by Mercury. The competition between Charles and Liza gradually increases to the point where they argue over Millennial's downfall. Kelsey questions Liza's loyalty. Diana and Kelsey go axe throwing and drinking. When the restroom is found to be out of order Diana is forced to urinate in the street and is cited on grounds of public urination, but she and Kelsey are then arrested when Kelsey accidentally waves one of the axes she's still holding in the police officer's face, but are bailed out by Enzo. Charles appears at Liza and Maggie's apartment, and sees Liza next to Josh and Gemma. Liza goes after him and they argue because Charles affirms that, in the end, both Mercury and Millennial are his property.
66	6	"Merger, She Wrote"	Peter Lauer	Ashley Skidmore	July 24, 2019	0.50
Maggie decides to paint the ceiling of the apartment and, in the process, ends up getting stuck upside down. She asks a neighbor for help and the man masturbates watching the scene. She breaks free after reaching for a switchblade and cuts the rope. During a recording session of Audrey's narration, Zane ends up leaving a microphone on, comments to Kelsey that he finds Audrey guilty of what she is accused of; she listens and leaves the studio enraged. In an attempt to get Travis Jason, author of a nonfiction book on drug-use for work, Charles and Liza decide to go to a "medicinal" retreat hosted by Jason. There, the two meet Josh, who is Travis's friend. Liza, under "not LSD", reveals her feelings about Josh and Charles to a nurse and hallucinates a tango dance with the two. After the retreat, Charles decides to sell Mercury to Kelsey for one dollar so he can work alongside Liza and stop fighting with his family: Kelsey, Liza and Diana.
67	7	"Friends with Benefits"	Todd Biermann	Darren Star	July 31, 2019	0.45
Zane and Charles are back at Millennial and Kelsey has a difficult time as she is still intimidated by her mentor, Charles. Liza finds an unfinished manuscript in some of Charles old boxes and pitches it to Kelsey; however, it turns out that Charles wrote the book when he was younger and does not want to publish it. Charles and Liza decide not to do things they do not like together after having uncomfortable conversations at events, and even run away from one. Liza and Josh reconnect for a bike ride. Elsewhere, Diana attends Enzo's niece's baptism, where Enzo's ex is the godmother with Enzo as godfather. Enzo's sister tells Diana that none of Enzo's relationships last more than a year. When Diana asks Enzo about it, he proposes to her outside the church, and realizing how much he means to her, she says yes.
68	8	"The Debu-taunt"	Todd Biermann	Sarah Choi	August 7, 2019	0.61
Liza goes to Charles' daughter's school to drop off a book report, wearing Pauline's jacket as she had no clothes at Charles' house. At the school she meets Pauline, they decide to start afresh and get lunch. Pauline even asks the school to register Liza. On hearing about this, Charles asks Liza to move in with her. At lunch Pauline asks Liza to help her with her new book and in return Liza asks her to be Millennial's author at the Debutante Ball, a big publishing event. On another visit to the school, Pauline gets to know Liza's real age. Feeling hurt and betrayed, she reveals Liza's secret in front of everyone at the Debutante Ball. Diana tries to stand up to her, but on getting to know the truth, runs out and faints on the road. At the hospital, Charles and Liza decide to postpone moving in together as Pauline wants to reconsider the custody agreement, and the time is not right. Diana threatens to fire Liza, but instead reconciles, after realizing how much she means to her.
69	9	"Millennial's Next Top Model"	Jennifer Arnold	Grant Sloss	August 14, 2019	0.55
Millennial deals with fallouts after the revelation of Liza's real age. Infinitely 21, a clothing brand with whom Millennial had a deal to sell books in store, cancelled their deal. However after Liza's speech to them about how being millennial is not about age, but about how you feel, they unfroze their deal and also wanted Liza to be a model for their spring collection. Josh walked in on Liza's photoshoot and a candid picture of him and Liza is chosen by Infinitely 21 for their campaign. Elsewhere, Zane and Kelsey sort things out and confess their love for each other. Maggie dates a man but does not enjoy the experience. Quinn asks Liza to join her in a talk about corporate ageism with New York 1 where Liza tells the anchor that Quinn knew about her real age from before. However, while shooting Quinn says she found out about it only a week back, a lie that could potentially affect her election campaign. She then asks Kelsey to fire Liza, but Kelsey refuses. It is later revealed that Quinn has pulled her funding and Millennial is broke once again.
70	10	"It's All About the Money, Honey"	Jennifer Arnold	Alison Brown	August 21, 2019	0.64
Kelsey and Charles fly to Chicago to meet with the only potential investor left. Kelsey convinces them that her social media is one of the important reasons for Millennial's success and asks them all to follow her. Liza sees the Infinitely 21 campaign and asks Kelsey to stop Charles from seeing it, but when she learns that the campaign is going national, she flies to Chicago. Kelsey and Charles celebrate winning the investment, and so Liza waits to break the news to Charles. In an inebriated state, Kelsey posts an indecent story to Instagram which she aimed to send to Zane, and falls asleep. The next morning, she becomes aware of her mishap and the investors say they still want to invest, but with Charles as publisher. Charles tries to convince them but Kelsey steps down as publisher. Charles is surprised that Liza flew to Chicago just to tell him about the Infinitely 21 ad campaign, and Liza decides she won't see Josh anymore. In further news, Josh learns that Clare has been offered a promotion at Google, but the job is in LA. Not wanting Clare to take the job and Gemma, and trying to capitalise on the Infinitely 21 campaign, he convinces them to enter into a partnership with Inkburg. Diana, Liza, and Lauren go dress shopping for Diana's wedding.
71	11	"Holding Out For A SHero"	Peter Lauer	Joe Murphy	August 28, 2019	0.55
Kelsey announces to the entire office that Charles is back as publisher and seems to be fine. However, when Charles questions some of her decisions as publisher, she does not know what to do. At the office, everyone is watching a remixed version of Kelsey's social media clip, when Liza scolds everyone and says Kelsey was a hero. This makes Kelsey agree to give a talk to school girls about how to be a SHero and avoid social media pitfalls. Kelsey and Zane break up again. Liza writes a handwritten letter to Josh about not wanting to see him again. The girls throw Diana a surprise bachelorette party. Afterwards they go to Inkburg, as Diana wanted to make a drunken mistake, but she backs out in the end. Josh confronts Liza about her letter and forces her to say she loves Charles more than him. When she does, Josh doesn't believe her and claims she is lying. In the end, Kelsey is seen penning a letter to Charles that it is time for her to move on.
72	12	"Forever"	Peter Lauer	Don Roos	September 4, 2019	0.63
When Kelsey tells Liza she's left her resignation letter on Charles' table, Liza runs to stop him from seeing it but Kelsey tells him she's leaving and they share an emotional goodbye. Kelsey is thinking about starting her own publishing company. Zane advises her not to do it, but after some unexpected advice from Maggie she approaches Quinn and manages to convince her to invest. Liza and Charles run into Quinn who tells them of this development, Charles then offers Kelsey a stake in the company and a seat on the board, because she is family. Enzo's uncle makes an ice statue of a fish (a trout) coming out of a toilet to signify Diana and Enzo's relationship, Diana hates it. However, Lauren sits on it without underwear and gets stuck, hence destroying the sculpture. Diana and Enzo get married. Kelsey and Zane hold hands at the ceremony. Infinitely 21 wants to license the tattoo that Josh gave Liza, but when he asks her whether she'd be okay with it, Liza remembers the time she got it and refuses. After inviting Liza and Caitlin to join him for a vacation with him and his daughters, Charles takes a big step in his relationship with Liza. At the wedding, while dancing to "their" song, he proposes to Liza. Before Liza can respond, Kelsey says yes to Charles' earlier offer and the episode ends on a cliffhanger.

== Production ==
TV Land renewed Younger for a sixth season in June 2018, ahead of the fifth season's premiere. The first table-read took place on February 15, 2019, whilst filming commenced in the following week. Miriam Shor directed one episode of the season, summing two installments directed by her on Younger. TV Land president Kevin Ray affirmed that the season would focus on the relationship between the characters of Liza and Charles. In the season's first official trailer, series creator Darren Star revealed that it would also chronicle Empirical Press' workplace and inside relations. Younger was renewed for a seventh season on July 24, 2019.

== Release ==
=== Broadcast ===
Younger's sixth season premiered on June 12, 2019, and concluded after twelve episodes on September 4. In September 2018, it was announced that the series was moving from TV Land to Paramount Network, airing during Thursdays. However, in April 2019, it was announced that it would stay on TV Land, airing on Wednesdays.

=== Marketing ===
An official trailer for the sixth season was released on April 17, 2019. On June 9, 2019, the season premiere was screened at the ATX Television Festival in Austin, Texas, followed by an interview with cast member Debi Mazar and writers Sarah Choi and Joe Murphy.

== Reception ==
=== Ratings ===
Upon its airing, the first episode became the series' highest-rated season premiere ever in the P25-54 and W25-54 demos. It scored a 1.21 rating and logged 457,000 viewers among women aging 25–54, up 30 percent from the fifth season's premiere. Among people aging 25–54, the episode was watched by 601,000 viewers, up 29 percent from the previous year. The season premiere drew 1.3 million total viewers, up 23 percent among total viewers from season five.

Viewership and ratings per episode of Younger season 6
No.	Title	Air date	Rating (18–49)	Viewers (millions)
1	"Big Day"	June 12, 2019	0.2	0.64
2	"Flush With Love"	June 19, 2019	0.1	0.58
3	"The Unusual Suspect"	June 26, 2019	0.1	0.53
4	"An Inside Glob"	July 10, 2019	0.1	0.65
5	"Stiff Competition"	July 17, 2019	0.2	0.63
6	"Merger, She Wrote"	July 24, 2019	0.1	0.50
7	"Friends with Benefits"	July 31, 2019	0.1	0.45
8	"The Debu-taunt"	August 7, 2019	0.1	0.61
9	"Millennial's Next Top Model"	August 14, 2019	0.1	0.55
10	"It's All About the Money, Honey"	August 21, 2019	0.1	0.64
11	"Holding Out For A SHero"	August 28, 2019	0.1	0.55
12	"Forever"	September 4, 2019	0.2	0.63

=== Critical response ===
On review aggregator Rotten Tomatoes, the season has an approval rating of 100% with an average rating of 7.94/10, based on eight reviews. While reviewing the first two episodes of the season, Jen Chaney from New York magazine's website Vulture.com praised Younger's consistency and ability to maintain its entertainment. The writer commented, "Six seasons in, Younger remains a fizzy New York fantasy that’s light without sacrificing its intelligence, a pleasure that comes with no residual guilt whatsoever." Melanie McFarland from website Salon glorified the series' approach on ageism, writing, "There's a lot to appreciate about how accessible this series made its conversations about age discrimination in the workplace and society at large, and hopefully others will draw influence from its blend of intelligence and lightheartedness." In a positive review, Christopher James from Awards Circuit singled out the series' approach of women in positions of power and ageism. He also lauded Duff's performance as Kelsey and the character story lines, as well as Shor's portrayal of Diana. Conversely, the author criticized the devaluation of the characters of Josh, Maggie, and Lauren. Overall, he wrote, "When the show concentrates on being a workplace comedy about the challenges of being a female executive, Younger truly excels."
