= Younger season 5 =

Younger
- Season 5
- Promotional poster
- Starring: Sutton Foster; Debi Mazar; Miriam Shor; Nico Tortorella; Hilary Duff; Peter Hermann; Molly Bernard; Charles Michael Davis
- No. of episodes: 12

Release
- Original network: TV Land
- Original release: June 5 – August 28, 2018

Season chronology
- Next → Season 6

The fifth season of Younger, an American comedy-drama television series created by Darren Star, was ordered on April 20, 2017. It premiered on June 5, 2018, and revolves around the lead Liza Miller, who has to manage her career in the publishing company having faked her identity as a younger woman to get her job, whereas her romantic life is marked by ups and comings. The season was produced by Darren Star Productions and Jax Media, with Star serving as showrunner.

Sutton Foster stars as Miller, with Debi Mazar, Miriam Shor, Hilary Duff, Nico Tortorella, Molly Bernard and Peter Hermann also returning from the fourth season. They are joined by Charles Michael Davis, who was promoted to series regular. The fifth season is the first to feature a Christmas special episode. Younger was renewed for a sixth season on June 4, 2018.

== Cast ==
=== Main ===
- Sutton Foster as Liza Miller
- Debi Mazar as Maggie Amato
- Miriam Shor as Diana Trout
- Nico Tortorella as Josh
- Hilary Duff as Kelsey Peters
- Peter Hermann as Charles Brooks
- Molly Bernard as Lauren Heller
- Charles Michael Davis as Zane Anders

=== Recurring ===
- Chris Tardio as Enzo De Luca
- Jason Ralph as Jake Devereux
- Jennifer Westfeldt as Pauline Turner-Brooks

=== Guest ===
- Grant Shaud as Bob Katz
- Richard Masur as Edward L.L. Moore
- Alanna Masterson as Kiara Johnson
- Christian Borle as Don Ridley
- Tessa Albertson as Caitlin Miller
- Jesse James Keitel as Tam
- Gina Gershon as Chrissie Hart
- Michael McKenzie as Luca
- Lois Robbins as Penelope
- Paul Fitzgerald as David Taylor
- Maddie Corman as Julia Katz
- Sarah Cohen as Rose Katz
- Tonye Patano as Akilah Jeffreis
- Stephanie Szostak as Dr. Sophia Bell
- Sally Pressman as Malkie
- Martha Plimpton as Cheryl Sussman
- Laura Benanti as Quinn Tyler
- Michael Urie as Redmond
- Phoebe Dynevor as Clare

== Episodes ==
No. overall	No. in season	Title	Directed by	Written by	Original release date	U.S. viewers (millions)
49	1	"#LizaToo"	Steven Tsuchida	Darren Star	June 5, 2018	0.60
Sexual misconduct allegations against Edward L.L. Moore leads Empirical Press to postpone his new novel. Marketing companies warn that they are dropping promotions of his work. Kelsey and Zane continue their quasi-rivalry while she discovers that Pauline's book is not being published under Millennial. Liza and Charles discuss their feelings, and she decides not to get between him and Pauline. The company changes its promotion focus to Pauline's book, which is sent back to printing to receive Millennial's label. As payback, Moore reveals Liza's secret to Charles.
50	2	"A Titanic Problem"	Steven Tsuchida	Dottie Dartland Zicklin & Eric Zicklin	June 12, 2018	0.70
Pauline's novel is picked up by Reese Witherspoon's book club and she sends her company's assistant to have a meeting with Kelsey, Pauline and Liza. After they leave, Liza returns and offers the assistant a deal to have exclusive access to Millennial's projects. During a party, Charles announces that he had accepted the partnership with Reese's company. Charles questions his feelings and judgment after finding out Liza's secret. He starts considering her dismissal, but his lawyer advises him to instead pretend and go along with it. Josh tells Liza that Clare has admitted that she only married him to get her green card.
51	3	"The End of the Tour"	Peter Lauer	Alison Brown	June 19, 2018	0.64
On the promotional tour of her book, Pauline lies about her relationship with Charles, while Diana and Liza try to help her emotionally. Charles appears in one of Pauline's Q&A sessions and she ends up telling a half-truth. Liza discovers that Charles is aware of her secret and tries to talk to him, but he says the two will maintain a strictly professional relationship. Josh tells Lauren that he is tired of falling in love and being disappointed, although he believes Liza and he are destined to be together. Kelsey and Zane vie for Barack Obama's former speechwriter Jake Devereux's memoir, but he chooses to be part of both Empirical and Millennial.
52	4	"The Talented Mr. Ridley"	Peter Lauer	Grant Sloss	June 26, 2018	0.74
During a party at Diana's apartment, Liza befriends journalist Don Ridley, and the bathroom toilet clogs. After the party, the plumber is revealed to be Diana's former lover Enzo, who invites her out for a date. Ridley pitches a book idea to Liza, Kelsey, and Charles, but the latter behaves rudely. Later, Charles apologizes to Liza for his behavior, explaining that he does not know how to act facing her lying. Kelsey and Jake kiss during a high-profile party despite their editor-client relationship.
53	5	"Big Little Liza"	Miriam Shor	Ashley Skidmore	July 10, 2018	0.55
After Don discovers Liza's fake driver's license, she tells him her secret and he uses it to write a Vanity Fair article about her, breaking her trust in him. However, Liza manages to make the magazine drop the article by starting an "age-queer" movement against ageism and age-shaming. After receiving threat of eviction, Josh tells Liza that he intends to sell his apartment and his tattoo shop and move away, but she advises him not to. Instead, he starts renovating the shop. Lauren throws a gender-friendly party but is reprimanded by her gender-queer assistant Tam about posting pictures online.
54	6	"Sex, Liza and Rock & Roll"	Steven Tsuchida	Joe Murphy	July 17, 2018	0.57
Famous rock singer Chrissie Hart is writing a memoir for Empirical and since she does not trust the Internet, Charles goes to her house to pick up the sketchbook, but she keeps stonewalling him. The morning after, Charles leaves after having an argument with Liza about their relationship. Liza manages to get the sketch by telling Chrissy how meaningful her music is, thus making her memoir appreciated. Maggie is chosen by the Whitney Biennial curators to be part of their exhibition. Diana spends the night in Enzo's house, learning that he does not have an impoverished living. Kelsey and Zane tell Jake that his chapter is not good enough, and Kelsey teams up with him to rework it.
55	7	"A Christmas Miracle"	Peter Lauer	Grant Sloss	July 24, 2018	0.64
Kelsey announces to Empirical staff that Jake's memoir is having an excerpt in New York magazine. Zane later tells her that he leaked it. During a party at the Katzs' household, Liza performs a family tradition with David and Caitlin at Bob, Julia and Rose's request. Charles shows up there and pretends that he has never met Liza. Enzo buys Diana a Christmas tree. Charles pulls Zane away from Jake's book editing after Jake told Charles that he does not want to work with Zane anymore after seeing him and Kelsey kissing, leading Zane to argue with Kelsey about their relationship. Penelope and Luca, the couple that bought Maggie's entire collection, invite her to a party in their house; there, she learns that they also bought the entire work of artist Akilah Jeffreis as an investment and not to be exhibited. Maggie then refuses to participate in the couple's "artist retreat" and leaves the party. Caitlin states to Josh that he is the best thing that has happened to Liza lately. Instead of leaving town, Charles is reminded of Liza's endearing performance, and makes a split second decision to find her. As Liza approaches her front door after an evening of grocery shopping, she meets Charles and they kiss.
56	8	"The Bubble"	Peter Lauer	Dottie Dartland Zicklin & Eric Zicklin	July 31, 2018	0.65
Charles and Liza have sex during a night out. Ten days later, following the Christmas break, he appears at the office with a full beard. Later that night, he and Liza have another night out. Lauren invites Maggie and Josh to have dinner with her new hook-up, who is revealed to be Malkie, Maggie's ex-girlfriend. While eating, Malkie tells Maggie that she is a grown-up who can't hold tight to something, referencing their past relationship. Zane continues to be angry at Kelsey. She tells Jake that they can't date anymore and should instead pursue a professional-only relation aiming to further develop a romantic one after his book gets published. Kiara schedules a meeting with Diana, Liza and Pauline concerning the miniseries based on Pauline's book. Pauline indirectly threatens Liza saying that she wants revenge. After the meeting, Pauline makes a deal with Charles to stay quiet about his relationship with Liza. Maggie hands a flower bouquet to Malkie and later paints her face on a wall to show her commitment. After his relationship with Kelsey, Jake states to Charles that he believes that his book belongs to Empirical instead of Millennial. Charles asks about Zane about it, who responds that Jake's book is better off with Kelsey and Millennial.
57	9	"Honk if You're Horny"	Todd Biermann	Alison Brown	August 7, 2018	0.79
Lauren reveals that Kelsey is being honored as the year's maverick at Glamour's Women of the Year awards. She then officially becomes Kelsey's publicist and pursues a job at Empirical by flattering Diana, which Diana refuses. Lauren meets Enzo and remembers that he starred in the first pornographic film she ever watched. She earns Diana's attention when she takes down the video. In a restaurant waiting for dinner, Charles and Liza are surprised by Redmond, who questions what they are doing together, and Liza improvises by lying that she is there to deliver a manuscript to Charles. Redmond realizes that the manuscript is one that was rejected by Millennial and, after Liza leaves, asks Charles to analyze it. Charles accepts the project, despite Kelsey's earlier decision, which causes Liza to tell her about her secret relationship with Charles, much to Kelsey's anger. Kelsey threatens Charles with the possibility of exposing his relationship with Liza. At the awards ceremony, Kelsey dedicates her award to herself and Liza. Charles gives Millennial money to succeed with a book by Quinn Tyler, a self-made millionaire, and Liza and Charles decide to keep their relationship a secret, since there are already many things going on in their lives.
58	10	"Girls on the Side"	Todd Biermann	Joe Murphy	August 14, 2018	0.74
Liza is puzzled to discover that Caitlin is dating an older man and this relationship is a secret since the man is a teacher. She tells Josh about her secret with Charles; they argue about her wanting to be "real" and Josh affirms his feelings. After seeing Charles with Quinn at an event, Liza realizes she should not continue her relationship in secret. Then Caitlin arrives from a wedding and claims that her boyfriend asked her to leave due to a risk of having their relationship exposed. Liza then advises Caitlin to have a public relationship. Charles reveals that Quinn is planning to invest in the company. Liza tells Charles that their relationship will only continue when the time is right to make it public. At Enzo's family's dinner, Diana and his mother discuss why the latter does not believe the former is a "decent woman" because she does not know how to cook. Afterwards, Enzo reveals he is moving to Manhattan and buying his own apartment.
59	11	"Fraudlein"	Andrew Fleming	Don Roos	August 21, 2018	0.70
Empirical and Millennial staff go to Frankfurt Book Fair, where Liza encounters Cheryl Sussman, a friend of Diana's and someone who knows Liza's real age. Charles tells Liza that he is meeting with several investors because the company's economic situation is difficult. They need to find an investor or the company has three months left. Diana says that two Millennial books have been chosen as "books of the fair". In a Q&A session, a journalist notices Liza's older appearance. Instead of blackmailing her, Cheryl offers Liza a job since Empirical is failing. As a way to date Charles and free Kelsey from the need to lie, Liza accepts Cheryl's offer and cuts off her ties with Empirical. Kelsey is sexually assaulted while drunk, and Zane protects her by punching the man, taking her to his bedroom so she can sleep and recover. The next day, she understands the situation and begins to rethink her judgment on Zane, while Zane discovers that the man he punched is a potential client.
60	12	"Lizability"	Andrew Fleming	Darren Star & Grant Sloss	August 28, 2018	0.73
Cheryl offers Liza the management of a new imprint, Chick(y), with a high salary, but Liza rejects the offer after Quinn proposes an investment that would make Millennial the main brand of Charles's company after she learns about Liza's secret. However, upon discovering the relationship of Liza and Charles, Quinn goes back and says she can not invest with such liability. To resolve the situation, Charles steps back as main publisher, with Kelsey replacing him. Enzo almost dies during a task operation in the sewers of New York, leaving Diana worried.

== Production ==
=== Development ===
Younger was renewed for a fifth season on April 20, 2017, ahead of the fourth season's premiere. The season started filming in February 2018. Foster has revealed that the season has a Christmas special installment and the premiere episode revolves around the Me Too movement.

=== Casting ===
In February 2018, it was announced that Charles Michael Davis had been promoted to series regular, after appearing in a recurring capacity in the previous season. In March 2018, Sutton Foster's ex-husband Christian Borle joined the cast in the guest role of a journalist named Don Ridley. In May 2018, Laura Benanti was announced as a guest actress, playing a "self-made billionaire" who "pitches a book to Millennial on her every-woman-for-herself approach to business." While being interviewed to TV Insider, Foster revealed that Martha Plimpton is returning to season 5 as Cheryl Sussman, a recurring character in the series. Moreover, Molly Bernard revealed that Jesse James Keitel would portray a "gender-queer assistant" to her character.

== Marketing ==
The first teaser trailer of the season was released on May 9, 2018. On June 3, 2018, the season premiere was screened at the annual Split Screens television festival in New York, followed by a "questions-and-answers" interview with cast members Debi Mazar, Nico Tortorella and Charles Michael Davis, and executive producers Dottie Zicklin and Alison Brown. The second episode of the season was screened in June 2018 at the annual ATX Television Festival in Austin, Texas.

== Reception ==
=== Ratings ===
Viewership and ratings per episode of Younger season 5
No.	Title	Air date	Rating (18–49)	Viewers (millions)
1	"#LizaToo"	June 5, 2018	0.2	0.60
2	"A Titanic Problem"	June 12, 2018	0.2	0.70
3	"The End of the Tour"	June 19, 2018	0.2	0.64
4	"The Talented Mr. Ridley"	June 26, 2018	0.2	0.74
5	"Big Little Liza"	July 10, 2018	0.2	0.55
6	"Sex, Liza and Rock & Roll"	July 17, 2018	0.2	0.57
7	"A Christmas Miracle"	July 24, 2018	0.2	0.64
8	"The Bubble"	July 31, 2018	0.2	0.65
9	"Honk if You're Horny"	August 7, 2018	0.3	0.79
10	"Girls on the Side"	August 14, 2018	0.3	0.74
11	"Fraudlein"	August 21, 2018	0.2	0.70
12	"Lizability"	August 28, 2018	0.2	0.73

=== Critical response ===
Younger's fifth season received positive reviews from critics. The review aggregator Rotten Tomatoes gave the season a 100% approval rating, with an average rating of 7.87/10, based on 9 reviews. Hanh Nguyen of IndieWire deemed that the fifth season is a "more mature phase" in front of previous seasons, stating that the series "shows promise in being able to adapt and grow, no matter what its age." While analyzing the premiere episode, Lizzy Buczak of TV Fanatic affirmed that the fifth season is "shaping up to be quite a great season." Jen Chaney of the Vulture magazine praised the season's take on reality, stating the series "obviously has no qualms about stretching the bounds of believability to suit its narrative, but the season's ending is one of those times when the show actually opts to be realistic."

Miriam Shor and her character Diana Trout were among TVLine's "Scene Stealers" of 2018, praising the character's "eventful" course in the season and Shor's performance. Upon the season finale's airing, Nico Tortorella was mentioned in TVLine's "Performers of the Week" article, with the writers commenting, "Tortorella’s innate ability to pivot from optimistic to devastated, as effortlessly as one would flip a light switch, is truly a gift."

=== Accolades ===
Due to her performance in the season, Shor was nominated for a Critics' Choice Television Award for Best Supporting Actress in a Comedy Series. The series was among the binge-watching-worthy shows of 2018 of the 44th ceremony of the People's Choice Awards.
