= Younger season 7 =

Younger
- Season 7
- Promotional poster
- Starring: Sutton Foster; Debi Mazar; Nico Tortorella; Peter Hermann; Molly Bernard; Hilary Duff
- No. of episodes: 12

Release
- Original network: Paramount+
- Original release: April 15 – June 10, 2021

Season chronology
- ← Previous; Season 6

The seventh and final season of the American comedy drama television series Younger was released on Paramount+ between April 15 and June 10, 2021, comprising 12 episodes. The season was produced by Darren Star Productions and Jax Media, with Star serving as showrunner. Initially thought to be delayed until March 2021, filming began in October 2020 and wrapped in February 2021, when it was announced that the series was moving from TV Land to Paramount+. The first four episodes were made available altogether and the rest of the season debuted on a weekly basis.

== Cast and characters ==
=== Main ===
- Sutton Foster as Liza Miller
- Debi Mazar as Maggie Amato
- Nico Tortorella as Josh
- Peter Hermann as Charles Brooks
- Molly Bernard as Lauren Heller
- Hilary Duff as Kelsey Peters

=== Recurring ===
- Miriam Shor as Diana Trout
- Laura Benanti as Quinn Tyler
- Charles Michael Davis as Zane Anders
- Michael Urie as Redmond
- Matt Passmore as Kai Manning
- Phoebe Dynevor as Clare
- Tessa Albertson as Caitlin Miller
- Janeane Garofalo as Cass Dekenessey
- Steven Good as Rob Davis

=== Guest ===
- Chris Tardio as Enzo de Luca
- Nadia Alexander as Fupa Grunhoff
- Kelli Barrett as Kamila
- Joanna Cassidy as Judith Clarke
- Ben Rappaport as Max Horowitz
- Mark Linn-Baker as Clive Wexler
- Jennifer Westfeldt as Pauline Turner-Brooks

== Episodes ==
No. overall	No. in season	Title	Directed by	Written by	Original release date
73	1	"A Decent Proposal"	Andrew Fleming	Darren Star	April 15, 2021
The season picks up from the end of season six, with Charles' proposal to Liza during Diana's wedding. Charles shares his interest in getting a response, as he truly wants her, but is willing to wait until she makes up her mind. Kelsey is met with some shocking news when she is informed that Zane has left Millennial/Empirical. Zane breaks up with Kelsey on FaceTime. While Diana is on her honeymoon, Lauren fills in for her role in marketing. Liza meets Charles to ask if they are good together and Charles assures her they are. It is also Lauren's 30th birthday, and her mother throws a "Little Women in Space"-themed birthday. After getting advice from Josh, Liza heads to the glass carousel to meet Charles and states that she wants to be "happily unmarried." Charles insists he was looking forward to their eventual marriage and ends their relationship, leaving Liza at the carousel.
74	2	"It’s the End of the World, Worm Girl"	Andrew Fleming	Don Roos	April 15, 2021
Liza deals with her and Charles' breakup. When Liza receives flowers at work the next day from a benefit she recently attended, Lauren believes they are from Charles and congratulates them on their engagement publicly. The two embarrassedly correct her. Kelsey tells Liza to drown her stress in work. They decide to find Fupa Grunhoff, a Greta Thunberg-like teenage activist who has rejected all book offers from other publishers, thus far. Liza convinces her to write for them by digging in a pile of compost and worms to find her lost bracelet. When the author of Arabian Sea, another upcoming book for Empirical, claims that climate change is not real on live television, Fupa goes on air and tells viewers not to buy the book, then denounces her deal with Empirical. Liza convinces her to return. Liza attends a charity auction with Charles, where she tries to compromise with him on their relationship, but he rejects her, telling her she should move on.
75	3	"FKA Millennial"	Andrew Fleming	Dottie Dartland Zicklin & Eric Zicklin	April 15, 2021
Charles and Quinn meet again in private, with Quinn pitching a new book called The F Word (for "failure"). Quinn pitches the idea to Kelsey, Liza, and the team, after which Charles requests the group's decision by the end of the day. Meanwhile, Redmond has a client, Australian surfing-legend Kai Manning, who is interested in publishing a book, with the team eventually giving their support. However, Redmond expresses concern when Kelsey tells him the Millennial imprint no longer exists, meaning the book would be published only under the "stodgy" Empirical label. Josh gets a visit from KT, a pop star's agent, warning him that her client will be asking for face tattoos and advising him to stall the star because the tattoos would nix an upcoming cosmetics deal. Josh is successful in getting the star to come back later for a breast tattoo, instead. The Empirical team attends a publicity party at the posh apartment building owned by Clare's new boyfriend, Rob. Kelsey learns that Zane has been named publisher for a competitor, right after she loses her own publisher title due to the Millennial imprint's demise. Liza argues with Charles after learning he approved Quinn's book without the team's input. After Kai asks Liza to be his editor, the two leave the party and have beers together at a local establishment. Josh is visited again by KT, who tells him her singer no longer wants tattoos, but that she is interested in getting one herself.
76	4	"Risky Business"	Andrew Fleming	Alison Brown	April 15, 2021
KT spends the night with Josh and their passion continues into the next morning, as heard by Kelsey and Lauren. Under pressure to make sure Empirical gets a good book out of Kai, Liza visits him in Montauk. After initially resisting his advances, Liza sleeps with Kai, then leaves with all of his diaries and personal logs. However, Liza and Kelsey find nothing in the material to make a decent book other than his many conquests and decide to pitch it to Charles as a Kama Sutra-style sex book. Charles receives an emergency call from Quinn’s assistant saying he needs to get her to a surprise birthday party at the Rainbow Room, but Quinn shocks everyone by saying she wants her party to be at Dave & Buster’s. As the episode closes, Quinn asks Liza if she and Charles are over, with the intent to date Charles herself.
77	5	"The Last Unicorn"	Jennifer Arnold	Grant Sloss	April 22, 2021
Liza has dinner with an old acquaintance, Vince, who misreads her intentions after she discusses breaking up with Charles because she didn't want to get married again. Josh and KT continue their torrid romance, with Josh admitting to Lauren and Kelsey that he hasn't yet told her about his daughter. Maggie starts a new job at the Arts College of New York, but things are immediately complicated when she learns that Kamilla, a woman she just had sex with, is the wife of her new boss, Cass. While fact-checking Quinn's book, Liza talks to Aiyana, Quinn's former campaign manager, who hints that Quinn is using Charles to increase her likability as she prepares for another run at political office.
78	6	"The F Word"	Jennifer Arnold	Sarah Choi	April 29, 2021
Liza labors over whether or not to tell Charles what she learned from Quinn's campaign manager. Maggie is prepping for her first class as a teacher, while her boss's wife continues to flirt with her via text. Maggie and Lauren then pretend to be a couple and attend dinner with Cass and Kamilla. Liza and Kelsey are disappointed by Charles, who refuses to publish a promising young author they met at their first "Inkubator" event, saying it's not on-brand for Empirical. Liza receives a message from Quinn's former campaign manager stating that she might be announcing her run for Governor; Liza tries to warn Charles about this while Quinn flips the narrative and embarrasses Liza. She confronts Liza as she is leaving, asking her to leave Charles alone. When KT learns of Josh's daughter, she insists she is not ready for a family and they part amicably.
79	7	"The Son Also Rises"	Jennifer Arnold	Joe Murphy	May 6, 2021
Judith, an older woman Charles slept with when he was in college, invites him to her late husband's funeral with the motive of trying to get Empirical interested in her son Topher's book. Charles is taken aback at Topher's likeness to himself, and realizes he is the right age to possibly be his son, but Judith later insists that's not the case. Diana checks in via video call from Italy. While still dealing with fallout from her new boss, Maggie learns she is at risk of being "cancelled" as transphobic because she jokingly titled an art show many years ago, "Gypsies, Trannies, and Thieves." Elsewhere, while apartment-hunting, Kelsey gets an opportunity to appear on a reality show with a prominent New York realtor.
80	8	"The Baroness"	Jennifer Arnold	Don Roos	May 13, 2021
When Liza's daughter Caitlin turns out to be a big fan of Quinn and her work, and Quinn agrees to appear at Caitlin's college event, Liza sees her rival may actually have a soft side. Maggie's situation goes from bad to worse when critical Tweets about her threaten her job, but she soon realizes the source of the Tweets and confronts Cass. Kelsey experiences the darker side of reality TV, but it draws her closer to Clare's ex, Rob, who owns the building where the series is shot.
81	9	"Fallout"	Peter Lauer	Alison Brown	May 20, 2021
Quinn learns from Lauren that the breakup between Charles and Liza only happened after Charles proposed and Liza declined. Charles learns about the recognition being gained by the young author from Liza and Kelsey's Inkubator project, through which they are releasing chapters free via a Vulture app. Realizing they need to lock up their author with an advance before someone else does, Kelsey proposes to use the money she had saved for her new apartment. Meanwhile, Liza and Charles collaborate to land husband-and-wife authors who have written a new mystery story as a couple. However, during a dinner meeting, the couple announces that they plan to use a single pen name for the book. Liza is in favor, but Charles says Empirical must decline if they cannot capitalize on the couple's name recognition. Liza refuses to ride home with Charles, calling him a stubborn person who always needs things to be his way. Kelsey begins dating Rob, but won't tell Clare when she later runs into her. Having told Liza she also has no interest in marrying Charles, Quinn later tells Charles something different.
82	10	"Inku-baited"	Peter Lauer	Grant Sloss	May 27, 2021
Charles agrees to visit Liza and Kelsey's next Inkubator event and all are shocked when established author Azalea King appears on stage as a way to deal with her writer's block. Kelsey gets help from Clare in developing the Inkubator app that will allow their authors to get paid, but their personal relationship crumbles when Clare learns that Kelsey is dating Rob. Maggie holds a show featuring pieces that satirize her current cancelled status and it becomes a success after a prominent art critic praises it on Instagram, possibly due to meddling from a guilt-ridden Cass. Charles invites Liza to dinner to say he's relented on Inkubator and thinks he can pitch it to Empirical as a possible imprint. The dinner almost turns romantic as the two leave.
83	11	"Make No Mustique"	Peter Lauer	Dottie Dartland Zicklin & Eric Zicklin	June 3, 2021
Charles informs Kelsey he's convinced the Empirical brass that Inkubator is a good idea. He returns the investment money Kelsey paid from her own pocket, plus a little extra for her and Liza. Charles' ex Pauline encounters Liza, apologizing for her past behavior and wanting to make things right by getting Liza and Charles back together. Charles is going on a romantic trip with Quinn to Mustique but, at the airport, he realizes he does not have his passport. Quinn openly scolds him, comparing him to her help. It turns out Pauline hid the passport in Charles' office, telling Liza she saw a ring and is afraid Charles will propose to Quinn on the trip. Liza locates the passport and heads to the airport. Elsewhere, Kelsey asks Rob to assess the value of the Inkubator app. Rob sends a "for your eyes only" email to two investors he knows, which starts a chain reaction wherein the email is forwarded to dozens of billionaires around the world, including Quinn. Meanwhile, Lauren's dad suffers a heart attack and is treated (and saved) by Lauren's old flame, Max. Lauren later has an illicit dream about Max. Liza arrives at the airport to give Charles his passport with minutes to spare, telling him she only wants him to be happy. As she leaves the airport, she is met by Charles, who says he could not leave with "the wrong person." He tells Liza the ring Pauline found was the one he had bought for Liza, and that he has no plans to marry Quinn, adding, "I don't think I even like her." He says he wants to be with Liza, marriage or not. The two embrace and kiss passionately. Alone and dejected on her private jet, Quinn opens the email that Rob sent out.
84	12	"Older"	Peter Lauer	Darren Star	June 10, 2021
Charles and Liza meet with Azalea King, asking her to be the first author to officially launch a book on the Inkubator app. Kelsey learns from Rob that the app's value far exceeds what either of them thought. She confides in Liza that she wants to go on her own, without Empirical. The two agree to keep it secret until after Empirical's 100th anniversary party, but Charles finds out via Quinn. Rob later says he wants 20 percent of Inkubator for using his connections. Kelsey is floored and breaks up with him, while she ponders crawling back to Charles. Liza reveals to Charles another secret she's been keeping: she sent his unfinished book to an exclusive writers' retreat and is happy to tell him he was accepted. Elsewhere, Maggie has a fun first date with Cass and Lauren has tea with Max, only to learn he's dating a man. As Kelsey makes up with Clare over their mutual hatred of Rob, Josh informs her that his landlord wants to unload some of his smaller properties. He gave Josh a bargain price on the building, which includes four apartments and Inkburg, and Josh plans to accept. In bed together, Charles asks Liza if she would have kept the secret about his book if he wasn't accepted. She says yes, leading to their breakup. Liza thinks she'll have to resign, but Charles surprises her at work, saying he wants her to run things while he's away at the retreat and offering her the editor-in-chief position. As Liza, Maggie, Lauren and Kelsey celebrate at a bar, Kelsey says she received an offer to run Inkubator through a company co-owned by Reese Witherspoon. The sad news is that she will be moving to Los Angeles. Liza heads to the bar to get more drinks and runs into Josh, saying, "I didn't see you here." Josh says he's been by her side all along. The two gaze into each other's eyes for several seconds before the series closes.

== Production ==
=== Development ===
TV Land announced the seventh season on July 24, 2019, making it the longest running original series in the network's history. In September 2020, series creator Darren Star was reached and announced that he was "unofficially planning [Season 7] as a final season." A spin-off series revolving on Liza's younger co-worker Kelsey Peters is in development, though it is unsure if the show will be produced by TV Land. The season will consist of 12 episodes, like the previous six. The series moved from TV Land to Paramount+ with the seventh and final season, which premiered on April 15, 2021, with the first four episodes available immediately and the rest debuting on a weekly basis. However, TV Land will afterwards show the final season starting with the first two episode on July 7, 2021 and a new episode every Wednesday thereafter.

=== Casting ===
The season stars Sutton Foster, Debi Mazar, Nico Tortorella, Hilary Duff, Molly Bernard, and Peter Hermann, reprising the roles from previous seasons. In January 2021, Tessa Albertson announced on Twitter that she had filmed her last scenes in the series, confirming her role as Liza's daughter, Caitlin Miller, in the seventh season. In March 2021, Miriam Shor, who portrays Diana Trout, and Charles Michael Davis, who portrays Zane Anderson, were demoted to the recurring cast from their main roles in all the previous seasons and the fifth and sixth seasons, respectively. In April 2021, Janeane Garofalo was cast in a recurring role for the final season.

=== Filming ===
Due to the COVID-19 pandemic, filming was halted as it was originally expected to begin in March 2020; however it began with only a small delay in mid-October 2020. Filming concluded after four months in mid-February 2021. After Duff finished filming her scenes for the entire series, Mazar posted a short tribute on Twitter about her, congratulating her for filming the season while being pregnant.

== Reception ==
The review aggregator website Rotten Tomatoes reported an approval rating of 100% and an average rating of 7.65/10 for the seventh season, based on 13 reviews. The website's critical consensus states, "A breezy, bittersweet farewell that captures everything that made the show so successful to begin with, Younger's final chapter is one for the ages."
