= Pamela Redmond Satran =

American novelist (born 1953)

- Born: Pamela Redmond; April 10, 1953 (age 73); New York City, U.S.
- Education: University of Wisconsin–Madison (BA, 1975)
- Occupations: entrepreneur; author
- Spouse: Dick Satran (m. 1981; div. 2015)
- Children: 3
- Writing career
- Period: 1988–present
- Genres: Drama; comedy; romance
- Notable work: Younger
- Website: pamelaredmondsatran.com

Pamela Redmond Satran (born April 10, 1953), now known as Pamela Redmond, is an American entrepreneur and author of fiction and nonfiction. Her novel Younger, published in 2005, is the basis for a TV series of the same name created by Darren Star and starring Sutton Foster and Hilary Duff.

== Early life and education ==
Pamela Redmond was born April 10, 1953, in New York City to Joseph Paul and Margaret (née Goudie) Redmond.

Raised in Norwood, New Jersey, she received a Bachelor of Arts from the University of Wisconsin–Madison (1975). While there, she was arts editor of The Daily Cardinal. After college, she moved to Brooklyn and worked as a fashion editor at Glamour magazine in New York and later as a fashion features editor.

== Career ==
=== Naming books and related endeavors ===
Satran left Glamour to co-author Beyond Jennifer & Jason (1988), a book analyzing style, image, and trends in personal naming, with Linda Rosenkrantz. The pair went on to write ten books on the subject, including The Baby Name Bible and Cool Names.

In 2008, seeing that information about names had migrated from books to the Internet, Satran and Rosenkrantz founded Nameberry, now the world's largest baby name website with a database of over 70,000 names, thematic naming lists, a daily blog, and forums for name searchers and enthusiasts.

=== Fiction ===
Satran writes novels that explore women's lives and issues from a contemporary and historical perspective. Her first novel, The Man I Should Have Married, published in 2003, focuses on a woman retracing the decisions of her life and correcting her mistakes.

Her 2005 novel Younger, about a woman in her forties who pretends to be in her twenties to get an entry-level job, is the basis for a TV show of the same name. The show, which debuted on TVLand on March 31, 2015, stars Sutton Foster, Hilary Duff, Debi Mazar, and Miriam Shor. Redmond published a sequel, Older, in 2020.

Satran's 2012 novel, The Possibility of You, is inspired by the story of her Irish grandmother moving to the United States in the early 20th century and examines the lives of three women grappling with unplanned pregnancies at three key moments in U.S. history.

== Personal life ==
Redmond married Dick Satran on November 7, 1981, with whom she has three children. The couple later divorced in 2015. In 2015, she moved to Los Angeles.

Satran lived Montclair, New Jersey from the 1980s. In the 1990s, Satran lived in Hampstead, London. While there, she coauthored books on naming in England and Ireland. In the late 1990s, Satran lived with her family in Berkeley, California, where she studied novel writing with Elizabeth George and Ann Packer.

== Books ==
=== Novels ===
- The Man I Should Have Married (2003)
- Babes in Captivity (2004)
- Younger (2005)
- Suburbanistas (2006)
- The Home for Wayward Supermodels (2007)
- The Possibility of You (2012)
- Older (2020)

=== Humor books ===
- 1000 Ways to be a Slightly Better Woman (2008)
- How Not to Act Old (2009)
- Rabid: Are You Crazy About Your Dog or Just Crazy? (2012)

=== Name books ===
with Linda Rosenkrantz

- Beyond Jennifer & Jason (2006)
- Cool Names for Babies (2008)
- The Baby Name Bible (2011)

=== Self-help ===
- Dressing Smart (1990)
- 30 Things Every Woman Should Have & Should Know by the Time She’s 30 (2012)
