= Peter Hujar's Day =

2025 American drama film

- Theatrical release poster
- Directed by: Ira Sachs
- Screenplay by: Ira Sachs
- Based on: Peter Hujar's Day by Linda Rosenkrantz
- Produced by: Jordan Drake; Jonah Disend
- Starring: Ben Whishaw; Rebecca Hall
- Cinematography: Alex Ashe
- Edited by: Affonso Gonçalves
- Production companies: Jordan Drake Productions; One Two Films; Complementary Colors; Blink Productions
- Distributed by: Janus Films
- Release dates: January 27, 2025 (Sundance); November 7, 2025 (United States)
- Running time: 76 minutes
- Country: United States
- Language: English
- Box office: $333,318

Peter Hujar's Day is a 2025 American biographical drama film written and directed by Ira Sachs. Set in 1974, the film stars Ben Whishaw as photographer Peter Hujar and Rebecca Hall as writer Linda Rosenkrantz.

On January 27, 2025, the film had its world premiere at the Sundance Film Festival. It was scheduled for release in U.S. theaters on November 7, 2025 by Janus Films.

== Plot ==
On December 19, 1974, photographer Peter Hujar visits the SoHo apartment of writer Linda Rosenkrantz to be interviewed for her book project documenting ordinary days in the lives of artists. Sitting on her couch, Peter begins recounting everything he did the previous day after admitting he had forgotten Linda’s request to write it down until she called him. As Linda records the conversation, she occasionally interrupts to ask questions, clarify details, and encourage Peter to remember seemingly insignificant moments.

Peter recalls accidentally sleeping through his 8:30 a.m. alarm before being awakened by a call from Jacqueline de Mornay, a French editor from Elle magazine, who was arriving to collect his photographs of model Lauren Hutton. While waiting, he receives a phone call from writer Susan Sontag, who asks for directions to his gallery exhibition and says she is leaving for Paris that day or the next. Peter admits he lied to Susan to conceal some earlier name-dropping involving a gallery representative. When Jacqueline arrives, she praises his photographs but cannot tell him how much he will be paid, making Peter suspicious as she departs with the prints. He then calculates the money he is owed, fields calls from neighbor Bob Mony and artist Ed Baynard, and, after venting to Linda about Ed’s lengthy conversation, returns to bed for another hour.

After waking again, Peter buys cigarettes, calls poet Allen Ginsberg to arrange a portrait session for The New York Times, and travels to Ginsberg’s apartment on the Lower East Side. There he meets Peter Orlovsky and several visitors while Ginsberg finishes phone calls and prepares to leave. Their conversation is awkward, and Ginsberg initially resists the assignment, insisting on being photographed outdoors rather than in the conventional style expected by a newspaper. He leads Peter through the neighborhood, posing among abandoned buildings and inside the burned-out remains of the former Peace Eye Book Store while chanting and meditating.

Peter eventually confronts Ginsberg, explaining that he is not representing the newspaper’s corporate interests and that this is his first assignment for The New York Times. Ginsberg’s attitude softens, and he agrees to continue the session inside his apartment. On the way back they stop at a vegetable stand, where Ginsberg buys persimmons, before returning to finish the portraits. They discuss writer William S. Burroughs, whom Peter is scheduled to photograph the following day, and part on friendly terms. Despite this, Peter later admits to Linda that he believes they never truly connected and that the photographs failed as portraits.

Back at his apartment, Peter eats a simple meal before spending the evening developing film in his darkroom. He avoids socializing by lying to a caller, then receives a phone call from Linda reminding him to write down everything he had done that day. After briefly making his notes, he resumes developing his negatives while receiving calls from writers Glenn O’Brien, Vince Aletti, and later Fran Lebowitz. During the interview, Peter and Linda listen to records and briefly dance together before returning to the tape recorder.

Peter recalls that Vince visits because his apartment has no hot water, and they share Chinese takeout while discussing the Ginsberg session and Peter’s feeling that he spends his days constantly working yet accomplishes very little. Glenn briefly stops by to collect photographic negatives before leaving. After his guests depart, Peter spends the rest of the night printing photographs for a restaurant commission and preparing prints for clients. Although initially disappointed by the Ginsberg contact sheets, he gradually begins to appreciate them while reflecting on his artistic ambitions and his desire for his work to stand on its own rather than depend on the fame of his subjects. As he struggles with failing eyesight while retouching prints, he and Linda discuss aging, physical decline, and the death of a fellow photographer.

Peter concludes by recalling how he finished preparing his prints for the following day, practiced a Bach piece on his harpsichord, brushed his teeth, and went to bed feeling exhausted from work and heavy smoking. During the interview, Linda scolds him for smoking, while Peter admits he wishes he could quit. Returning to his account of the previous night, Peter recalls being awakened shortly after falling asleep by sex workers talking outside his apartment and watches one woman apply her makeup in the reflection of a parked detention-center truck before returning to bed. Peter falls silent as he and Linda look out at the river, and the interview ends.

== Cast ==
- Ben Whishaw as Peter Hujar
- Rebecca Hall as Linda Rosenkrantz

== Production ==
The film was produced by Jordan Drake and Jonah Disend.

Rosenkrantz published a book of the same name in 2021, documenting Hujar's activities over 24 hours in 1974. Sachs was initially unsure if the project would be a short film or a feature, but was convinced to produce a feature-length film in response to Whishaw's passion and insight into the language.

Production began in New York City on April 14, 2024.

== Release ==
The film premiered at the 2025 Sundance Film Festival on January 27, 2025. Shortly after, Janus Films and Sideshow acquired distribution rights to the film, with Janus releasing it on November 7, 2025. It screened at the 75th Berlin International Film Festival in February 2025.

The film screened in the non-competitive Freestyle section of the 20th Rome Film Festival in October 2025.

== Home media ==
The film was released on Blu-ray and DVD on May 12, 2026.

== Reception ==
On the review aggregator website Rotten Tomatoes, 92% of 95 critics' reviews are positive. The website's consensus reads: "Confined to a limited setting, Peter Hujar's Day proves surprisingly expansive as director Ira Sachs insightfuly captures the repartee between Rebecca Hall and Ben Whishaw at the top of their game." Metacritic, which uses a weighted average, assigned the film a score of 82 out of 100, based on 27 critics, indicating "universal acclaim".

In a review for Rogerebert.com, critic Monica Castillo writes that the film "is a masterclass in composition, creating movement where there is little and finding an unconventional way to film two people talking."

== Accolades ==
Award	Date of ceremony	Category	Recipient(s)	Result	Ref.
Berlin International Film Festival	February 23, 2025	Best Feature Film	Peter Hujar's Day	Nominated	
Dorian Awards	March 3, 2026	Unsung LGBTQ Film of the Year	Peter Hujar's Day	Won	
Gijón International Film Festival	November 22, 2025	Best Film	Peter Hujar's Day	Nominated	
Gijón International Film Festival	November 22, 2025	Best Actor	Ben Whishaw	Won	
Independent Spirit Awards	February 15, 2026	Best Feature	Jonah Disend, Jordan Drake	Nominated	
Independent Spirit Awards	February 15, 2026	Best Director	Ira Sachs	Nominated	
Independent Spirit Awards	February 15, 2026	Best Lead Performance	Ben Whishaw	Nominated	
Independent Spirit Awards	February 15, 2026	Best Supporting Performance	Rebecca Hall	Nominated	
Independent Spirit Awards	February 15, 2026	Best Cinematography	Alex Ashe	Nominated	
Queerties Awards	March 10, 2026	Drama Movie	Peter Hujar's Day	Nominated	
USC Scripter Awards	January 24, 2026	Film	Peter Hujar's Day (Ira Sachs)	Nominated	
