= Peter Hujar =

American photographer (1934–1987)

- Self-Portrait Standing (1980), book cover for Love & Lust
- Born: October 11, 1934; Trenton, New Jersey, U.S.
- Died: November 26, 1987 (aged 53); New York City, U.S.
- Resting place: Gate of Heaven Cemetery
- Known for: Black & white portrait photography
- Website: peterhujararchive.com

Peter Hujar (/ˈhuːdʒɑːr/; October 11, 1934 – November 26, 1987) was an American photographer best known for his black-and-white portraits. Hujar's work received only marginal public recognition during his lifetime, but he has since been recognized as a major American photographer of the 1970s and 1980s.

== Early life ==
Hujar was born on October 11, 1934, in Trenton, New Jersey, to Rose Murphy, a waitress, who was abandoned by her husband during her pregnancy. He was raised by his Ukrainian grandparents on their farm. He remained on the farm until his grandmother's death in 1946, and his mother took him to New York City to live with her and her second husband in their one-room apartment. The household was abusive, and in 1950, when Hujar was 16, he left home and began to live independently.

== Education ==
Hujar received his first camera in 1947 and in 1953 entered the School of Industrial Art where he expressed interest in being a photographer. He encountered an encouraging teacher, the poet Daisy Aldan (1923–2001), and following her advice he became a commercial photography apprentice. Apart from classes in photography during high school, Hujar's photographic education and technical mastery was acquired in commercial photo studios, where he could use the darkroom during afterhours. By 1957, when he was age 23 he was making photographs now considered to be of museum quality. Early in 1967, he was one of a select group of young photographers in a master class taught by Richard Avedon and Marvin Israel, where he met Alexey Brodovitch and Diane Arbus.

== Artistic career ==
In 1958, Hujar accompanied the artist Joseph Raffael on the latter's Fulbright scholarship to Italy. In 1963, he secured his own Fulbright and returned to Italy with Paul Thek, whom he had been dating since 1959, where they explored and photographed the Capuchin Catacombs of Palermo, images of the dead later featured in Portraits in Life and Death.

In 1964, Hujar returned to America and became a chief assistant in the studio of the commercial photographer Harold Krieger. Around this time, he met Andy Warhol, posed for four of Warhol's three-minute Screen Tests and was included in the compilation film The Thirteen Most Beautiful Boys that was assembled from Screen Tests.

Hujar quit his job in commercial photography in 1967, and at great financial sacrifice, began to pursue primarily his own art work that reflected his homosexual milieu. He was an influential artist-activist of the gay liberation movement; in 1969, with his lover, the political activist Jim Fouratt, he witnessed the Stonewall riots in the West Village. At the urging of Fouratt, he documented the first gay liberation march (June 28, 1970), and took the now somewhat ironic photo "Come out!!" for the Gay Liberation Front. After their break-up at the end of the year, he had to move into his studio (on 10 East 23rd St) until mid-1972, and in the spring of 1973 he moved into a loft formerly occupied by Jackie Curtis above the Eden Theater in the East Village. Hujar transformed the space in such a way that he could live and work there for the rest of his life.

=== Portraits in Life and Death ===
At the end of 1974, Hujar had an exhibition at the Foto Gallery on 492 Broome St, alongside pictures by Christopher Makos, where he didn't sell any of his work, but according to a friend gained a book contract with Da Capo Press. In the following months, he took many portraits to include in the book. Besides his friends like Susan Sontag, Fran Lebowitz, and Vince Aletti, he portrayed artists like John Waters, drag queen actor Divine and writer William S. Burroughs. In the final book published in 1976, the portraits were juxtaposed by a selection of the pictures he took of the corpses in the Catacombs of Palermo in 1963. Susan Sontag (in a hospital at the time) wrote an introduction for the sequence of 41 images of Portraits in Life and Death. The book got a tepid reception, and only later became a classic in American photography; it was reissued in 2024.

=== The 1980s ===
In early 1981, Hujar met the young artist David Wojnarowicz, and after a brief period as Hujar's lover, Wojnarowicz became a protégé linked to Hujar for the remainder of the photographer's life. Hujar remained instrumental in all phases of Wojnarowicz's emergence as an important young artist.

Another artist closely linked with Hujar is Robert Mapplethorpe. Both artists were gay white men who excelled at portrait photography and who made unashamedly homoerotic work that walked the line between pornography and fine art, but they were structural opposites. If Mapplethorpe reduced his subjects to abstract forms, his sitter's faces to masks, his nude models to sculptures, then Hujar emphasized his sitters' idiosyncrasies, their irreducible qualities, their human sentience over their fleshy geometry. "Orgasmic Man", one of Hujar's more memorable works, is also a key difference between his work and Mapplethorpe's; never once, in all of Mapplethorpe's editioned photographs, did he show orgasm or ejaculation nor did he depict the concomitant facial expressions.

Hujar had a wide array of subjects in his photography, including cityscapes and urban still lifes, animals, nudes, abandoned buildings, and European ruins. His photography, which was mostly in black and white, has been described as conveying an intimacy, suggestive of both love and loss. One aspect of this intimate quality was Hujar's ability to connect with his sitters. One of his models was quoted after an unsuccessful session as saying:

"We couldn't 'reveal.' As an actor you have to reveal. And Hujar's big thing was that you had to reveal. I know that now, but I didn't know it at the time. In other words, blistering, blazing honesty directed towards the lens. No pissing about. No posing. No putting anything on. No camping around. Just flat, real who-you-are...You must strip down all the nonsense until you get to the bone. That's what Peter wanted and that was his great, great talent and skill."

Hujar's portraits, the subject of the first half of the one book he published while he was alive, are simple; he almost never used props and the focus of his work was on the sitter as opposed to the backdrop of the shot. Usually, his subjects either were sitting or posing in a recumbent way.

== Death and legacy ==
In January 1987, Hujar was diagnosed with AIDS. He died 10 months later, aged 53, on November 25 at Cabrini Medical Center in New York. His funeral was held at Church of St. Joseph in Greenwich Village, and he was buried at Gate of Heaven Cemetery in Valhalla, New York.

Hujar willed his estate to his lifelong friend Stephen Koch, who administered it until his death in February 2026. Hujar had only made two or three prints of his pictures and didn't wish that more prints should be made posthumously. A first retrospective of Hujar's work in collaboration with the estate was shown two years after his death at the Grey Art Gallery & Study Center of New York University. It was followed by a more comprehensive show in 1994 by a joined effort of the Stedelijk Museum Amsterdam (Netherlands) and the Fotomuseum Winterthur in Switzerland. In 2013 the Morgan Library & Museum in New York acquired a hundred prints and the entirety of his written estate and all contact sheets from the Peter Hujar Archive. A collaboration between the Morgan Library and the Spanish Mapfre Foundation enabled a major travelling retrospective exhibition that was accompanied by a comprehensive monograph published in conjunction with Aperture in 2017.

In 2025, the film Peter Hujar's Day was released, directed by Ira Sachs with actor Ben Whishaw playing the part of Hujar. The film is a cinematic rendition of Linda Rosenkrantz's book of the same name, which documented a single day in Hujar's life. In 2026, The Wonderful World That Almost Was: A Life of Peter Hujar and Paul Thek by Andrew Durbin was published. The book is a joint biography of the two artists.

== Publications ==
- Peter Hujar. Portraits in Life and Death. New York: Da Capo, 1976, ISBN 978-0-306-70755-1, ISBN 978-0-306-80038-2. Introduction by Susan Sontag.
  - Reissue: New York: W. W. Norton / Liveright, 2024, ISBN 978-1-324-09217-9. Foreword by Benjamin Moser.
- Peter Weiermair (ed.). Peter Hujar. Innsbruck, Austria: Allerheiligenpresse, 1981. Contributions by Jean-Christophe Ammann and Dieter Hall.
- Peter Hujar. New York: Grey Art Gallery & Study Center, New York University, 1990, ISBN 978-0-934349-07-9. Texts by Stephen Koch and Thomas Sokolowski, interviews by Fran Lebowitz and Vince Aletti.
- Urs Stahel, Hripsimé Visser (eds.). Peter Hujar: A Retrospective. Zurich, Switzerland: Scalo, 1994, ISBN 978-1-881616-35-1. Foreword by Urs Stahel, texts by Hripsimé Visser, Max Kozloff, and Stephen Koch; mementos by Jean-Christophe Amann, Nan Goldin, Marvin Heiferman, John Heys, Fran Lebowitz a. o.
- Klaus Kertess. Peter Hujar: Animals and Nudes. Santa Fe, New Mexico: Twin Palms, 2002, ISBN 978-0-944092-95-8.
- Peter Hujar: Lost Downtown. New York: Pace/MacGill Gallery; Göttingen: Steidl, 2016, ISBN 978-3-95829-106-5. Text by Vince Aletti.
- Peter Hujar – Speed of Life. Madrid: Fundación Mapfre; New York: Aperture, 2017, ISBN 978-1-59711-414-1; original Spanish edition: A la velocidad de la vida, ISBN 978-84-9844-608-1; paperback edition in French, 2019, ISBN 978-2-915704-89-1. Contributions by Philip Gefter, Joel Smith, Steve Turtell and Martha Scott Burton.
- Moyra Davey, Peter Hujar – The Shabbiness of Beauty. London: Mack, 2021, ISBN 978-1-913620-20-2.
- Linda Rosencrantz. Peter Hujar's Day, Magic Hour, 2022, ISBN 978-1-63944-267-6. Transcription of the chronicle of Hujar's December 19, 1974 as told by him and recorded by Rosencrantz. Introduction by Stephen Koch.
- Steve Lawrence (ed.). Newspaper. Originally edited by Steve Lawrence, Peter Hujar and Andrew Ullrick. Primary Information, 2023, ISBN 978-1-7377979-4-4. Facsimile of all 14 issues from 1969 to 1971 in one book.
- Peter Hujar: Rialto. Kyiv, Ukraine: Rodovid Press, 2024, ISBN 978-617-7482-65-8.
- Gary Schneider. Peter Hujar Behind the Camera and in the Darkroom. BookCrave (Artbook D.A.P.), 2024, ISBN 979-8-218-37146-3.
- Andrew Durbin. The Wonderful World That Almost Was: A Life of Peter Hujar and Paul Thek. New York: Farrar, Straus, and Giroux, 2026, ISBN 978-0-374-60955-9

=== Further reading ===
- Mary-Kay Lombino.Subterranean Monuments: Burckhardt, Johnson, Hujar (exhibition magazine). Poughkeepsie, NY: Frances Lehman Loeb Art Center, Vassar College, 2006.
- Lorenzo Fusi. Changing Difference: Queer Politics and Shifting Identities: Peter Hujar, Mark Morrisroe, Jack Smith (exhibition catalogue). Milan, Italy: Silvana, 2013, ISBN 978-88-366-2506-2.
- Gary Schneider. Salters Cottages. New York: Dashwood Books, 2019, ISBN 978-0-9966574-6-4.
- Harrison Adams. Intimacy, Photography, Shame: 1969-1992. London: Routledge, 2024, pp. 73–97. ISBN 1032732814.

== Exhibitions ==
This list follows the comprehensive compilation of the exhibitions of Hujar's work until 2017 provided by Joel Smith in the Mapfre/Aperture monograph Speed of Life. All solo exhibitions in his lifetime are named here, while most group shows were omitted.

- 1974: as part of Recent Acquisitions, Floating Foundation of Photography, New York
- 1975: Portfolio by Peter Hujar, Foto Gallery, New York (alongside Christopher Makos: Pictures from a Suitcase)
- 1977: Catskill Center for Photography, Woodstock, New York
- 1978: Peter Hujar: Photographs, Port Washington Public Library, New York
- 1979: Peter Hujar: Recent Photographs, Marcuse Pfeifer Gallery, New York
- 1980: La Remise du Parc, Paris, France
- 1980: Tiroler Landesmuseen, Innsbruck
  - Museum Moderner Kunst Wien
- 1981: Peter Hujar: Recent Photographs, Robert Samuel Gallery, New York
- 1982: Larry Clark / Peter Hujar, Frankfurter Kunstverein, Germany (catalogue), expanded to
  - Peter Hujar / Larry Clark / Robert Mapplethorpe, Kunsthalle Basel, Basel, Switzerland
- 1982: Galerie Jurka, Amsterdam, the Netherlands
- 1982: Galerie Nagel, Berlin, Germany
- 1983: Forum Stadtpark, Graz, and Modern Art Galerie, Vienna, Austria
- 1986: Peter Hujar: Recent Photographs, Gracie Mansion Gallery, New York

=== Posthumous exhibitions ===
After his death several commercial galleries showed his work in (solo) exhibitions, like James Danziger (1991, 1992, 1998), Paula Cooper (1993, 2002), Wessel and O'Connor (1998), all situated in New York, Stephen Daiter in Chicago, Yezerski in Boston, and Berinson in Berlin (all three in 1999), Rodolphe Janssen in Brussels (1996), Renée Ziegler (1990) and Mai 36 (2002, 2010) in Zurich, and Maureen Paley and Marietta Neuss in London (both 2008). Closely engaged with the Peter Hujar Archive since the 2000s and regularly arranging shows of Hujar's work are Matthew Marks (first in 2000) and Pace/MacGill (since 2013) in New York, the Fraenkel Gallery in San Francisco (since 2002), and Maureen Paley in London (since 2008). Listed here are just the gallery shows which were accompanied by a catalogue (with a single exception), in addition to all solo shows in public institutions.

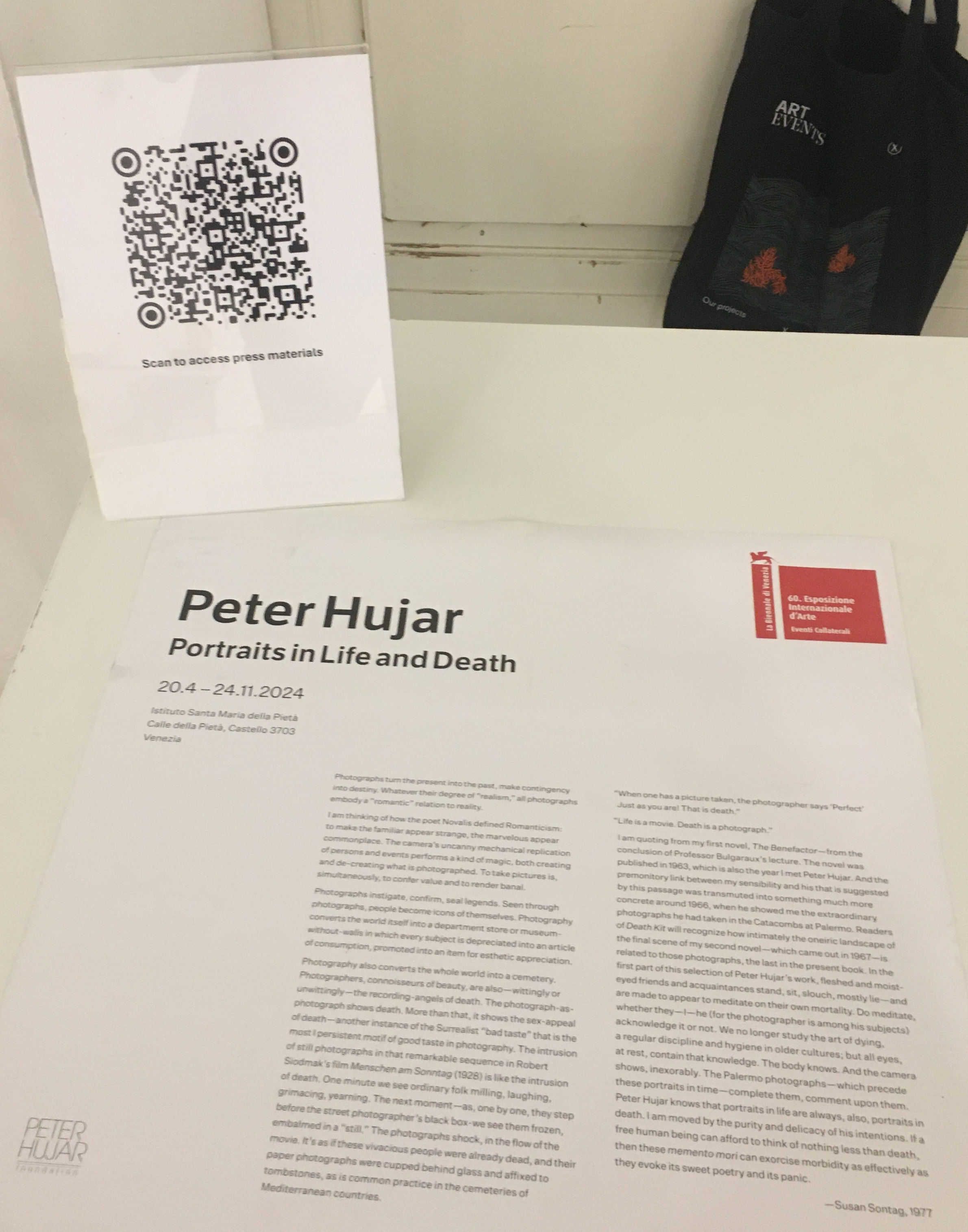
Peter Hujar: Portraits in Life and Death, organized by the Ukrainian Museum, NY as collateral exhibition of Venice Biennale 2024

- 1989: Grey Art Gallery & Study Center, New York, and
  - Fine Arts Gallery, University of British Columbia, Vancouver, Canada
- 1994: Peter Hujar: A Retrospective, Stedelijk Museum Amsterdam, Netherlands, and
  - Fotomuseum Winterthur, Switzerland
  - in 1995 as Peter Hujar. A Charm in Life and Death, Kunstmuseum Wolfsburg, Germany
- 1996: Peter Hujar: Das photographische Werk, DAAD-Galerie, Berlin, Germany (no catalogue)
- 1999: Peter Hujar: Intimate Survey, Stephen Daiter Gallery, Chicago, Illinois
- 2005: Peter Hujar – Night, Matthew Marks Gallery, New York, and
  - Fraenkel Gallery, San Francisco
  - Howard Yezerski Gallery, Boston
  - Scalo Galerie, Zurich, Switzerland
- 2005: P.S.1 Contemporary Art Center, Long Island, New York
- 2007: Institute of Contemporary Arts, London
- 2008: Paul P. / When Ghost Meets Ghost / Peter Hujar, Maureen Paley Gallery, London, UK
- 2009: Peter Hujar: Photographs 1956–1958, Matthew Marks Gallery, New York
- 2010: Peter Hujar: Thek's Studio 1967, Alexander von Bonin, New York, and
  - Mai 36 Galerie, Zurich, Switzerland
  - Maureen Paley Gallery, London
- 2014: Peter Hujar: Love & Lust, Fraenkel Gallery, San Francisco, California
- 2017–2019: Peter Hujar: Speed of Life, Mapfre, Barcelona, Spain; traveled to
  - Fotomuseum Den Hague, The Netherlands
  - Morgan Library & Museum, New York
  - Berkeley Art Museum and Pacific Film Archive, California
  - Wexner Center for the Arts, Columbus, Ohio
  - Galerie nationale du Jeu de Paume, Paris, France
- 2020: Moyra Davey, Peter Hujar, Galerie Buchholz, Berlin
- 2022: Peter Hujar curated by Elton John, Fraenkel Gallery, San Francisco
- 2023: Peter Hujar: Performance and Portraiture, Art Institute of Chicago, Illinois
- 2024: Peter Hujar: Rialto, Ukrainian Museum, New York
- 2024: Peter Hujar: Portraits in Life and Death, Istituto Santa Maria della Pietà, Venice, Italy, on the occasion of the 60th Venice Biennale
- 2025: Peter Hujar: Eyes Open in the Dark, Raven Row, London, 30 January – 6 April 2025.
- 2026: Hujar:Contact, Morgan Library & Museum, New York, 22 May – 25 October

== Collections ==
Hujar's work is held in the following collections (a. o.):
USA

- New York
  - Brooklyn Museum
  - Morgan Library & Museum
  - Metropolitan Museum of Art
  - Museum of Modern Art
  - Whitney Museum of American Art
- Art Institute of Chicago, Illinois
- Carnegie Museum of Art, Pittsburgh, Pennsylvania
- Dallas Museum of Art, Dallas, Texas
- Fogg Museum, Harvard University, Cambridge, Massachusetts
- J. Paul Getty Museum, Los Angeles, California
- Museum of Fine Arts, Boston, Massachusetts
- Museum of Fine Arts, Houston, Texas
- Nelson-Atkins Museum of Art, Kansas City, Missouri
- Saint Louis Art Museum, Missouri
- San Francisco Museum of Modern Art, California
- Walker Art Center, Minneapolis, Minnesota
- Yale University Art Gallery, New Haven, Connecticut

UK and Europe

- Folkwang Museum Essen, Germany
- Fotomuseum Winterthur, Zurich, Switzerland
- Gallery of Modern Art, Glasgow, Scotland
- Stedelijk Museum Amsterdam, Amsterdam, the Netherlands
- Tate Modern, London, UK: 10 prints (as of May 2021)
