= Younger (TV series) =

American comedy-drama TV series (2015–2021)

- Genre: Comedy drama; Romantic comedy
- Created by: Darren Star
- Based on: Younger by Pamela Redmond Satran
- Showrunner: Darren Star
- Starring: Sutton Foster; Debi Mazar; Nico Tortorella; Hilary Duff; Miriam Shor; Peter Hermann; Molly Bernard; Charles Michael Davis
- Composers: Chris Alan Lee; Peter Nashel
- Country of origin: United States
- No. of seasons: 7
- No. of episodes: 84 (list of episodes)

Production
- Executive producers: Darren Star; Larry W. Jones; Laura Brant; Keith Cox; Tony Hernandez; Dottie Dartland Zicklin; Eric Zicklin; Alison Brown
- Producers: John Skidmore; Lilly Burns; Karl Frankenfield; Ashley Skidmore; Grant Sloss
- Production location: New York City
- Cinematography: John Thomas
- Camera setup: Single-camera
- Running time: 20–46 minutes
- Production companies: Darren Star Productions; Jax Media; MTV Entertainment Studios

Original release
- Network: TV Land
- Release: March 31, 2015 – September 4, 2019
- Network: Paramount+ / Hulu
- Release: April 15 – June 10, 2021

Younger is an American comedy-drama television series created and produced by Darren Star. It is based on the 2005 novel of the same title by Pamela Redmond Satran. The single-camera series premiered on TV Land on March 31, 2015, and has received generally positive reviews from critics. Ahead of the fifth season's premiere, it was renewed for a sixth season, which premiered on June 12, 2019. In July 2019, TV Land renewed the series for a seventh and final season, making it the longest-running original series in the network's history.

The series moved from TV Land to Paramount+ and Hulu for its seventh and final season, which premiered on April 15, 2021, and concluded on June 10, 2021. The seventh season was later aired on TV Land.

== Synopsis ==
Set in New York City, after a contentious divorce with her gambling ex husband, a single 40 year old mom, Liza Miller, is forced to look for work as she needs to continue paying for her daughter's college education, however, she quickly realizes how the job market became ageist over the years. However, after a freak encounter with an attractive tattoo artist, Josh, who thinks she's in her mid 20s, Liza decides not only reboot her career, but her entire life as a mid 20-something to help get her a job. However, she realizes she needs to work twice as hard to keep both her old and new life separate as there are times when they collide at inopportune times.

== Cast and characters ==
=== Main ===
- Sutton Foster as Liza Miller, a 40-year-old divorced mother
- Debi Mazar as Maggie Amato, Liza's lesbian artist best friend and roommate
- Miriam Shor as Diana Trout, Liza's temperamental boss, who works as head of marketing at Empirical Press (seasons 1–6; guest season 7)
- Nico Tortorella as Josh, a 26-year-old tattoo artist who owns his studio
- Hilary Duff as Kelsey Peters, a 26-year-old book editor at Empirical Press who befriends Liza after they start working together
- Molly Bernard as Lauren Heller, Kelsey's 26-year old friend (seasons 2–7; recurring season 1)
- Peter Hermann as Charles Brooks, head and heir of Empirical Press (season 2–7; recurring season 1)
- Charles Michael Davis as Zane Anders, an editor at Rivington who competes with Kelsey to discover who's best (seasons 5–6; recurring season 4; guest season 7)

=== Recurring ===
- Dan Amboyer as Thad and Chad Weber, twin brothers with strange behavior. Thad was Kelsey's boyfriend, until his death. Afterwards, Chad appeared and began to pursue Kelsey.
- Tessa Albertson as Caitlin Miller, Liza's college-age daughter
- Thorbjørn Harr as Anton Björnberg, a Swedish writer who got his book signed at Empirical Press. He and Kelsey were having an affair while Kelsey was working on his book.
- Paul Fitzgerald as David Taylor, Liza's ex-husband and Caitlin's father
- Jon Gabrus as Gabe, one of Josh's nerdy friends
- Kathy Najimy as Denise Heller, Lauren's mother
- Michael Urie as Redmond, an agent and social media icon
- Noah Robbins as Bryce Reiger, a 20-something tech billionaire who is interested in investing in Empirical
- Ben Rappaport as Max Horowitz, Lauren's ex-boyfriend
- Jay Wilkison as Colin McNichol, a writer who infatuates Kelsey
- Mather Zickel as Dr. Richard Caldwell, a doctor who starts a relationship with Diana
- Meredith Hagner as Montana Goldberg / Amy, a barista friend of Maggie. She starts working as Maggie's assistant and hooking up with Josh, but he soon discovers that she was copying Maggie's arts.
- Aasif Mandvi as Jay Malic, A man who discovers Liza's secret and befriends her
- Burke Moses as Lachlan Flynn, a spy novelist who becomes the motive of Zane and Kelsey's quarrel
- Jennifer Westfeldt as Pauline Turner-Brooks, Charles' ex-wife, with whom he has two daughters, and who naively believes that they can get back together
- Chris Tardio as Enzo, Diana's plumber boyfriend
- Phoebe Dynevor as Clare, an Irish citizen who begins dating Josh after Liza's recommendation. She and Josh then plan a green card marriage in Ireland.
- Laura Benanti as Quinn Tyler (seasons 5–7), a businesswoman and author who purchases Empirical Press and makes Kelsey the head publisher of Millennial. She later dates Charles.
- Janeane Garofalo as Cass Dekenessey (season 7), the dean of a local art school who hires Maggie as an Artist in Residence

=== Guest ===
- Martha Plimpton as Cheryl Sussman, a rival publisher who knew Liza early in her career and threatens to expose her
- Richard Masur as Edward L.L. Moore, the writer of Crown of Kings, one of Empirical Press' biggest-selling novel series, which is a homage to George R. R. Martin's A Song of Ice and Fire. The character himself is a homage to Martin, having similarity to Martin's physical traits.
- Camryn Manheim as Dr. Jane Wray, a famous therapist who records a podcast which inspires a book called The Deciding Decade
- Lois Smith as Belinda Lacroix, a romance novelist, one of Empirical Press' oldest members. After decades of successful works, she dies during a lunch with Liza, Charles and Diana.
- Jesse James Keitel as Tam, Lauren's personal assistant

== Episodes ==
Season	Episodes	Originally released		
Season	Episodes	First released	Last released	Network
1	12	March 31, 2015	June 9, 2015	TV Land
2	12	January 13, 2016	March 23, 2016	TV Land
3	12	September 28, 2016	December 14, 2016	TV Land
4	12	June 28, 2017	September 13, 2017	TV Land
5	12	June 5, 2018	August 28, 2018	TV Land
6	12	June 12, 2019	September 4, 2019	TV Land
7	12	April 15, 2021	June 10, 2021	Paramount+ / Hulu

== Production ==
=== Development ===
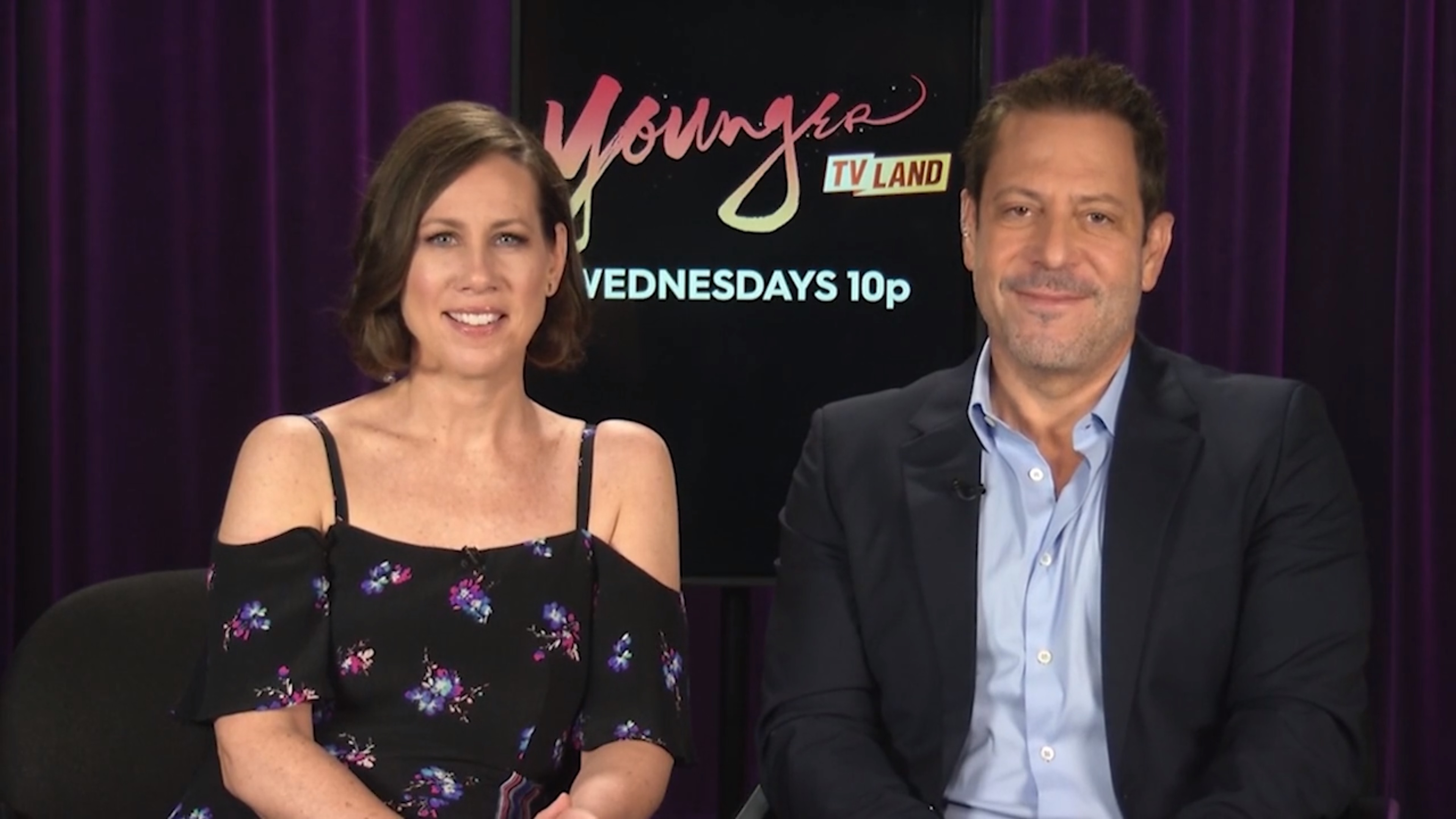
Actress Miriam Shor and creator Darren Star interviewed on Sidewalks Entertainment about Younger in 2017

The series is based on the Pamela Redmond Satran's novel of the same name. In October 2013, TV Land ordered the pilot from creator and executive producer Darren Star. Patricia Field, who worked with Star on Sex and the City, is a costume consultant on the production. The pilot was picked up to series in April 2014, with a 12-episode order. On April 21, 2015, Younger was renewed for a second season of 12 episodes, which premiered on January 13, 2016. Ahead of the fifth season's premiere, it was renewed for a sixth season, which premiered on June 12, 2019. On July 24, 2019, TV Land renewed the series for a seventh season, making it the longest running original series in the network's history. The series moved from TV Land to Paramount+ and Hulu with the seventh and final season which premiered on April 15, 2021 with the first 4 episodes available immediately and the rest debuting on a weekly basis.

=== Casting ===
Sutton Foster was cast in the lead role of Liza Miller in December 2013. Hilary Duff and Miriam Shor joined the main cast in the following month. Debi Mazar was cast in February 2014. After a recurring role in the first season, Molly Bernard was added to the main cast from the second season onward. In February 2018, it was announced that Charles Michael Davis had been promoted to series regular, after appearing in a recurring capacity in the fourth season. On March 14, 2018, it was announced that Christian Borle would appear in the fifth season in a guest starring role playing the journalist Don Ridley in two episodes. On May 4, 2018, it was confirmed that Laura Benanti would appear in the fifth season, playing a self-made billionaire named Quinn. On March 17, 2021, it was announced that Miriam Shor and Charles Michael Davis have been demoted to recurring guest stars for the seventh and final season. In April 2021, Janeane Garofalo was cast in a recurring role for the final season.

== Release ==
=== Broadcast ===
The series aired on NickMom from September 16 to September 27, 2015, On September 5, 2018, it was announced that the series would be moved to Paramount Network from the sixth season onward; however, it was announced on April 3, 2019 that the series would stay on TV Land. In 2025, it is now streaming on Netflix. Broadcasters carrying Younger include M3, E!, and CTV 2 in Canada; and Sony and Comedy Central in the United Kingdom.

=== Marketing ===
In June 2018, during the opening night screening at the annual ATX Television Festival in Austin, Texas, a first look at the second episode of the fifth season was showcased, whilst a panel discussion with Darren Star and cast members took place. That same month, the book Marriage Vacation, mentioned in the series, was launched in real life by Simon & Schuster. In June 2019, the sixth-season premiere was also screened at the ATX Television Festival, followed by an interview with cast member Debi Mazar and writers Sarah Choi and Joe Murphy.

=== Soundtrack ===
A soundtrack album, Younger (TV Land Series Soundtrack), was released by Lakeshore Records on July 2, 2021. The release features songs used in the series, including Hilary Duff's cover of "Little Lies", "Soundbite from Cast" by Sutton Foster, Hilary Duff and Miriam Shor, and their performance of "9 to 5".

Track listing
No.	Title	Artist(s)	Length
1	"Get Some"	Lykke Li	3:22
2	"Jealous"	Ingrid Michaelson	3:06
3	"Walk Through the Fire" (featuring Ruelle)	Zayde Wølf	3:35
4	"Wicked Game"	Gemma Hayes	4:04
5	"Take My Breath Away"	Berlin	4:10
6	"Seventeen"	Sjowgren	3:45
7	"Back to You"	Univerxity	2:19
8	"Coming Home"	Leon Bridges	3:25
9	"Little Lies"	Hilary Duff	3:23
10	"Bolder"	Anna Dellaria	3:47
11	"Burning Love"	Laye	2:44
12	"Save Us" (featuring Anna Dellaria)	Chris Alan Lee	3:30
13	"Million Dollar Life"	Wendy Page, James Fenton Marr, Elizabeth Hooper and Andrew Bojanic	0:21
14	"Soundbite from Cast" (bonus track)	Sutton Foster, Hilary Duff and Miriam Shor	0:41
15	"9 to 5"	Sutton Foster, Hilary Duff and Miriam Shor	1:34

== Reception ==
=== Ratings ===
Viewership and ratings per season of Younger
Season	Timeslot (ET)	Episodes	First aired		Last aired		Avg. viewers (millions)
Season	Timeslot (ET)	Episodes	Date	Viewers (millions)	Date	Viewers (millions)	Avg. viewers (millions)
1	Wednesday 10:00 pm	12	March 31, 2015	0.46	June 9, 2015	0.65	0.55
2	Wednesday 10:00 pm	12	January 13, 2016	0.43	March 23, 2016	0.68	0.60
3	Wednesday 10:00 pm	12	September 28, 2016	0.50	December 14, 2016	0.60	0.56
4	Wednesday 10:00 pm	12	June 28, 2017	0.80	September 13, 2017	0.83	0.73
5	Wednesday 10:00 pm	12	June 5, 2018	0.60	August 28, 2018	0.73	0.67
6	Wednesday 10:00 pm	12	June 12, 2019	0.64	September 4, 2019	0.63	0.58

=== Critical response ===
Critical response of Younger
Season	Rotten Tomatoes	Metacritic
1	97% (37 reviews)	75 (20 reviews)
2	100% (8 reviews)	74 (4 reviews)
3	100% (8 reviews)	—N/a
4	100% (10 reviews)	—N/a
5	100% (9 reviews)	—N/a
6	100% (8 reviews)	—N/a
7	93% (14 reviews)	—N/a

Younger has received critical acclaim. Rotten Tomatoes gives the first season an approval rating of 97% based on 37 reviews, and an average rating of 7.6/10. The site's critical consensus reads, "Darren Star's witty writing and Sutton Foster's charisma help elevate Younger above some of TV Land's previous sitcoms." Metacritic gives the first season a weighted average score of 75 out of 100, based on 20 critics, indicating "generally favorable reviews".

On Rotten Tomatoes, the second season has an approval rating of 100% based on 8 reviews, and an average rating of 7.1/10. Metacritic gave the season a score of 74 out of 100, based on reviews from 4 critics, indicating "generally favorable reviews".

Brian Lowry of Variety gave the series a mostly positive review, describing it as "not perfect but highly watchable" and pointing out that "inevitably, there are stereotypical aspects on both sides of the age gap—from the flakiness of Kelsey's contemporaries to Diana too often coming across as a bitter scold—but the series seldom pitches so far across those lines as to be unable to find its way back."

On the New York magazine website Vulture.com, Margaret Lyons gave a mostly positive review, describing "a sweetness to the series, an almost admiration for the various crummy behaviors [of the characters]." She went on to say that she wished the show "had a longer first season not just because I liked it, but more because it's featherweight, and as its current run stands, might have been better off as a feature-length rom-com." Megan Garber reviewed the show for The Atlantic saying, "Younger, a fairy tale fit for basic cable, is a treacly confection of a show: witty but not wise, delightful but not deep. And yet—like its creator Darren Star’s previous exploration of age and sexuality and identity in a tumultuous time, Sex and the City—it offers, almost in spite of itself, deep insights into the culture of the moment."

Tom Conroy of Media Life Magazine criticized the show mainly for portraying Sutton Foster's character Liza with "early-middle-age cluelessness", featuring "particularly silly" publishing-industry details and presenting "a relationship between an educated 40-year-old mother and a 26-year-old college dropout" that, in his belief, "has nowhere to go."

But Jonathan Alexander writes in the Los Angeles Review of Books that "Younger works in part because it plays to both millennials, who are often portrayed as hip and hardworking, creative and generous, as well as to late Gen-Xers who are facing a corporate and consumer world that's seemingly forgotten them in its drive to cater to the needs, tastes, and interests of a younger (and numerically larger) generation."

Darcie Wilder of Vice wrote in her review: "Younger is unexpectedly addictive, nothing short of extremely soothing and pleasurable to watch. It's a bedtime story that's supposed to lull but is too engaging to ever actually let you doze off. Usually when I binge, there's a hard out when I finally get caught up to real time, entering the headspace of its regular audience and eventually losing interest—but that hasn't happened with Younger, not yet."

The seventh and final season of Younger had good reviews from critics. Nicole Galluci of Mashable wrote in a review "Ultimately, the episodes are engaging as ever, and though it's rare with final seasons, I find myself struggling to squash the belief that this show still has so much left to give." Fan reacted to the final season with "mixed feelings," according to multiple reports.

== Viewership ==
According to data from Showlabs, Younger ranked tenth on Netflix in the United States during the week of 13–19 January 2025.

=== Awards and nominations ===
Year	Award	Category	Nominee	Result	Ref.
2015	MTV Fandom Award	Best New Fandom	Younger	Nominated	
2015	Teen Choice Awards	Choice Breakout TV Show	Younger	Nominated	
2015	Online Film & Television Association	Best Actress in a Comedy Series	Sutton Foster	Nominated	
2015	Adweek Hot List Television Awards	Best New Comedy Series	Younger	Won	
2016	People's Choice Awards	Favorite Cable TV Actress	Hilary Duff	Nominated	
2016	Women's Image Network Award	Best Actress in a Comedy Series	Sutton Foster	Nominated	
2016	Women's Image Network Award	Best Writing in a Comedy Series	Alison Brown	Nominated	
2016	Hollywood Music in Media Awards	Best Musical Supervision- Television	Robin Urdang	Nominated	
2017	People's Choice Awards	Favorite Cable TV Comedy	Younger	Nominated	
2017	People's Choice Awards	Favorite Cable TV Actress	Hilary Duff	Nominated	
2017	Women's Image Network Award	Best Actress in a Comedy Series	Sutton Foster	Nominated	
2017	Women's Image Network Award	Best Comedy Series	Younger	Nominated	
2017	Teen Choice Awards	Choice Summer TV Actress	Hilary Duff	Nominated	
2018	8th Critics' Choice Television Awards	Best Actress in a Comedy Series	Sutton Foster	Nominated	
2018	People's Choice Awards	The Bingeworthy Show of 2018	Younger	Longlisted	
2019	9th Critics' Choice Television Awards	Best Supporting Actress in a Comedy Series	Miriam Shor	Nominated	
2019	Teen Choice Awards	Choice Summer TV Show	Younger	Nominated	
2019	Teen Choice Awards	Choice Summer TV Actress	Hilary Duff	Nominated	
2019	Gracie Allen Awards	Outstanding Female Actor in a Supporting Role in a Comedy or Musical	Hilary Duff	Nominated	

== Cancelled Kelsey spin-off ==
It was reported in May 2020 that ViacomCBS and Darren Star have partnered to develop a spin-off series which would revolve around Kelsey Peters, with Hilary Duff starring. However, on June 10, 2021, following the series’ conclusion, it has been revealed that the spin-off is no longer in the works, due to Duff being cast on the How I Met Your Mother spin-off, How I Met Your Father. According to Star, he stated that the Kelsey spin-off has been resolved after the series finale, regardless of any notion of one. Star also stated that "it was always going to end with Kelsey doing her own thing, alone, heading to Los Angeles".

== International adaptations ==
Initial reports disclosed that South Korean television network JTBC had plans to broadcast the Korean adaptation of Younger, with Kim Seong-yoon attached to direct.

The series is being adapted in China by Endemol Shine China and Huace Group. It is being remade as a 40-part series in Mandarin with episodes of 45 minutes.

Ukrainian TV channel Novyi Kanal broadcast an adaptation called Молода. The premiere was supposed to take place in the spring of 2022, but due to Russia's invasion of Ukraine, it was postponed to 2023. It began airing since March 20, 2023.
