= Linda Rosenkrantz =

American writer (born 1934)

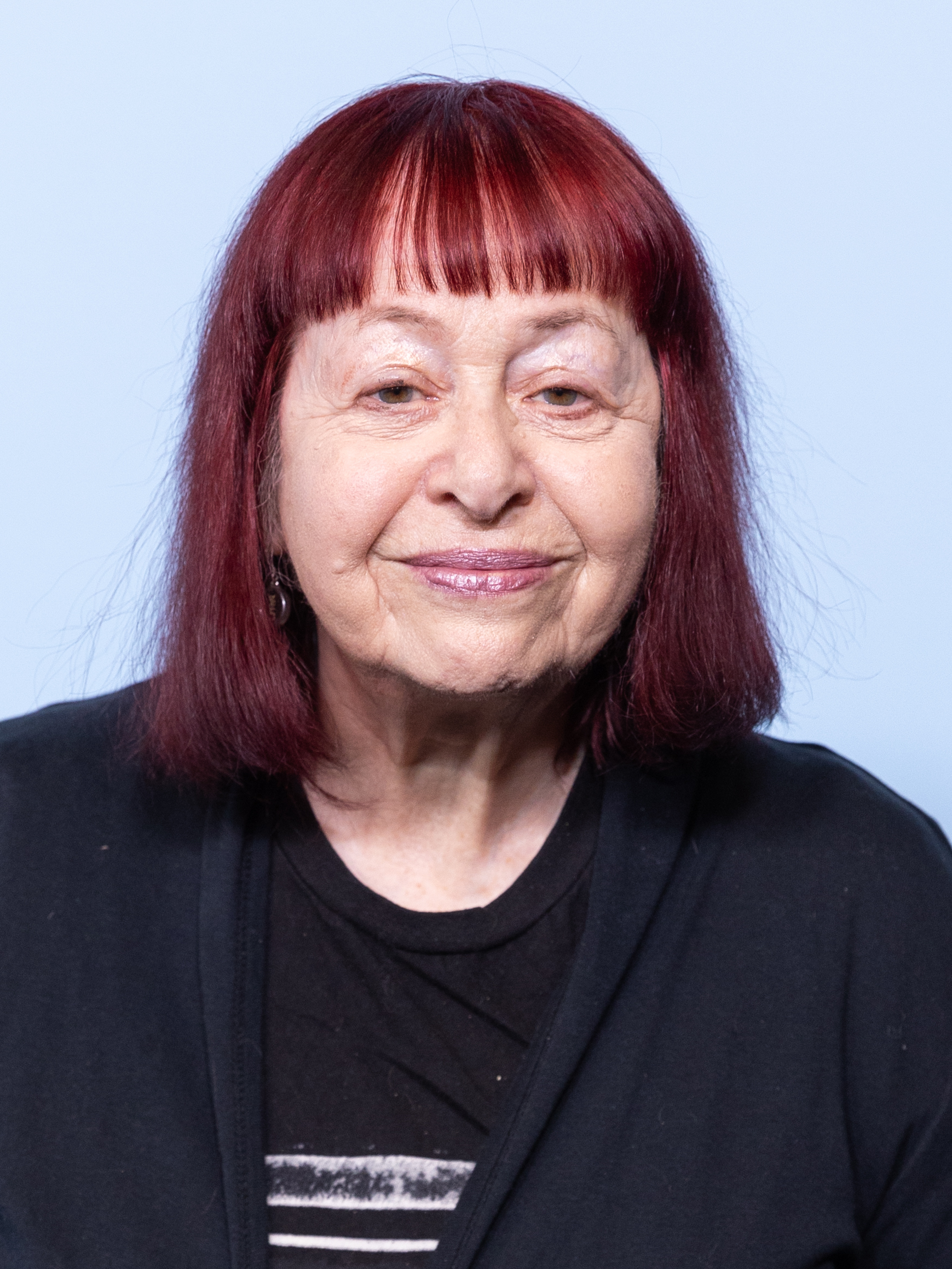
- Rosenkrantz in 2025
- Born: May 26, 1934 (age 92); New York City, U.S.
- Education: University of Michigan
- Occupation: Author
- Spouse: Christopher Finch
- Children: 1

Linda Rosenkrantz (born May 26, 1934) is an American writer, known for her innovations in the realm of "nonfiction fiction," most prominently in her 1968 novel Talk, a New York Review Books classic.

== Life and career ==
Linda Rosenkrantz was born and raised up in the Bronx, New York, the daughter of Samuel, a garment industry executive, and Frances, an artist. She is a graduate of the High School of Music and Art in Manhattan and the University of Michigan.

After college, she joined the editorial and publicity department of Parke-Bernet auction galleries. She was the founding editor of Auction magazine, published first by Sotheby-Parke-Bernet, and then by Institutional Investor, from 1967 to 1972, featuring original cover art by artists and photographers such as Salvador Dalí and Peter Hujar, and articles by eminent art critics and antiques experts.

In 1975, Rosenkrantz was the subject of an early Chuck Close color-grid painting, Linda, now owned by the Akron Art Museum. Around this time, Rosenkrantz was a part of the New York art world, her immediate circle including such artists as Hujar, Joseph Raffael, Paul Thek and Susan Brockman, being a charter member of Ray Johnson's New York Correspondence School, as well as attending Andy Warhol parties at the Factory.

In 1986, Rosenkrantz began writing a weekly column, "Contemporary Collectibles", which was widely syndicated by Copley News Service for 25 years. In 1990, she relocated to Los Angeles with her husband, writer Christopher Finch, and daughter Chloe.

== Talk ==
In 1968, Rosenkrantz's novel Talk, based on the taped conversations of herself and two friends in East Hampton, Long Island, was published by Putnam's in New York and by Anthony Blond in London two years later, followed by a New American Library paperback edition. Talk was the subject of a double-page spread in the fledgling New York magazine and garnered feature reviews in, among others, The New York Times, The Washington Post, American Vogue and in British Vogue, which picked it as one of its Books of the Year. Nearly half a century later, Talk was reissued as a New York Review Books Classic, receiving positive attention in The New York Times, the New Statesman, The Guardian, The Paris Review (whose then-editor Lorin Stein, picked Talk as his #1 summer book of 2015), The New Republic, The Nation Harper's Magazine, The Village Voice (which called it "a favorite of the year"), and other periodicals. An excerpt appeared on Literary Hub, and Rosenkrantz was featured on NPR's Bookworm show and New York magazine's Sex Lives podcast.

Talk has been translated into Spanish as La Charla, published by Editorial Anagrama in 2017, and into Italian as Talk!, published by 8tto in 2019.

== Peter Hujar's Day ==
In 1974, Linda Rosenkrantz embarked on another tape-based project. She asked a number of her friends and acquaintances, including Peter Hujar and artist Chuck Close, to write down everything they did on one particular day, then to meet with her to report and record in conversation the events of their day. Forty years later, in 2021, a transcript of the Hujar chapter was published in book form by Magic Hour Press as Peter Hujar's Day. The book was adapted into a film, Peter Hujar's Day, directed by Ira Sachs and starring Ben Whishaw as Peter Hujar and Rebecca Hall as Rosenkrantz.

== Baby Names ==
In 1988, Rosenkrantz co-wrote with Pamela Redmond Satran, Beyond Jennifer and Jason: An Enlightened Guide to Naming Your Baby, a book that is considered to have revolutionized the naming of children in the United States and beyond, the first name guide to organize names into lists, identify style trends, calculate name popularity, and analyze the effects of pop culture on naming trends. This was followed by a series of nine more books on such specialty areas as British names, Irish names, Jewish names, and Cool Names and the encyclopedic Baby Name Bible.

In 2008, the website nameberry.com was launched by Rosenkrantz and Satran, based on their ten books on the subject. Nameberry has become the world's leading website devoted to baby names. It is widely recognized as the international authority on baby name style, history, and trends, attracting six million unique monthly visitors and 25 million page views from virtually every country around the world.

== Ex ==
In 2018, five sections of Rosenkrantz's taped work-in-progress, Ex, were excerpted and published in comix form on Lena Dunham and Jenni Konner's newsletter Lenny Letter. The concept of the book was to invite a number of old boyfriends for dinner, one by one, serve each of them the same menu, and have a tape recorder running from the moment they entered her Upper East Side apartment to the moment they left. The resultant edited transcripts display not only a diversity of male personalities but shifting versions of Rosenkrantz herself.

== Bibliography ==
- Talk, G. P. Putnam's Sons, 1968
- Gone Hollywood: The Movie Colony in the Golden Age (with Christopher Finch), Doubleday, 1979
- Soho (novel written with Christopher Finch under the pseudonym C. L. Byrd), Doubleday, 1983
- Beyond Jennifer & Jason (with Pamela Redmond Satran), St. Martin's Press, 1988
- Sotheby's Guide to Animation Art (with Christopher Finch), Henry Holt and Company, 1998
- My Life as a List: 207 Things about My Bronx Childhood, Clarkson Potter, 1999
- Telegram: Modern History as Told Through More Than 400 Witty, Poignant and Revealing Telegrams, Henry Holt and Company, 2003
- Cool Names for Babies (with Pamela Redmond Satran), St. Martin's Press, 2003
- The Baby Name Bible (with Pamela Redmond Satran), St. Martin's Press, 2007
- Peter Hujar's Day, Magic Hour Press, 2021
