= Charles Michael Davis =

American actor

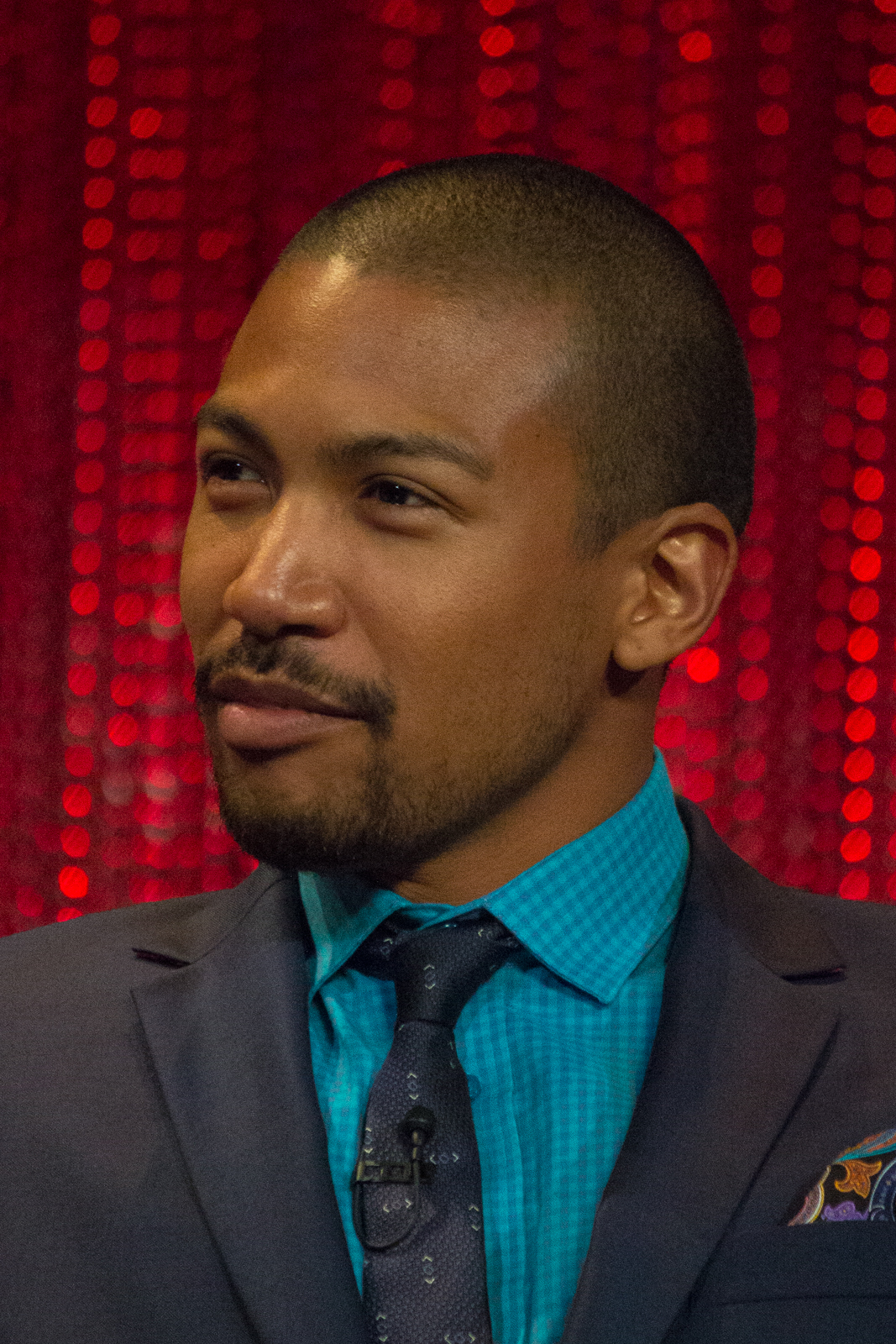
- Davis at PaleyFest 2014 for The Originals.
- Born: December 1, 1981 (age 44); Dayton, Ohio, U.S.
- Occupation: Actor
- Years active: 2005–present
- Partner: Jenna Rosenow (2023-present)

Charles Michael Davis (born December 1, 1981) is an American actor. Best known for his roles as Marcel Gerard on The CW television drama The Originals (2013–2018) and Zane Anders on the TV Land original series Younger (2017–2021). He also starred as Special Agent Quentin Carter on NCIS: New Orleans.

== Early life ==
Davis was born in Dayton, Ohio. He graduated from Stebbins High School in the Dayton suburb of Riverside in 2000, and from Miami University in Oxford, Ohio. He is of African American and Filipino descent. His father is from Kentucky and his mother is from Manila. He has 3 sisters.

== Career ==
Davis got his start at an Actors, Models, and Talent for Christ (AMTC) event. Davis has done print modeling and commercials for Nike and FootLocker.

Davis has had guest and recurring appearances in several notable television shows, including That's So Raven, Switched at Birth, and Grey's Anatomy. In 2011, he landed a recurring role on BET's The Game as Kwan Kirkland, a quarterback for the San Diego Sabers.

In February 2013, it was announced that Davis was cast in a lead role on The CW's new show The Originals, a spinoff of The Vampire Diaries, centered on the Original Family as they move to New Orleans, where Davis' character (a vampire named Marcel) currently rules.

In 2018, after appearing in a recurring capacity in the fourth season of the American comedy-drama Younger, Davis was promoted to the series' main cast for its fifth season.

Davis joined the cast of NCIS: New Orleans in March 2020, playing the role of Special Agent Quentin Carter, the new agent for NCIS New Orleans office.

On July 17, 2020, Davis starred alongside Laura Harrier as a couple going through a breakup in the music video for "What's Love Got to Do with It", the remix version by Kygo of the original Tina Turner song.

In March 2022 it was announced that Davis would appear in Legacies as Marcel Gerard.

Davis was in a relationship with choreographer and model Katrina Amato. However, in a September 19, 2014, episode of the CBS talk show The Talk, he disclosed that he is "newly single".

== Filmography ==
=== Film ===
Year	Title	Role	Notes
2009	Thanksgiving Seconds	Les	Short
2010	Night and Day	Hicks	TV movie
2013	The Proposal	Charles	Short
2014	The Learning Curve	Frank	Short
2015	Ur in Analysis	Mike	TV movie
2015	Battle Scars	Ramirez	
2018	Younger: Candy Shop	Zane	Short
2018	No Sleep ‘til Christmas	Josh Wright	TV movie
2019	Same Time, Next Christmas	Jeff Williams	TV movie

=== Television ===
Year	Title	Role	Notes
2005	That's So Raven	Trevor	Episode: "Save the Last Dance"
2011	Switched at Birth	Liam Lupo	Recurring cast: Season 1
2011–12	The Game	Kwan Kirkland	Recurring cast: season 4-5
2013	The Client List	Ben Dalton	Episode: "Cowboy Up" & "Hell on Heels"
2013	Grey's Anatomy	Dr. Jason Myers	Recurring cast: Season 9
2013	The Vampire Diaries	Marcel Gerard	Episode: "The Originals"
2013–18	The Originals	Marcel Gerard	Main cast
2017–21	Younger	Zane Anders	Recurring cast: season 4, main cast: season 5-6, guest: season 7
2018	Jane the Virgin	Jeffrey Mullins	Episode: "Chapter Seventy-Three"
2018	Z Nation	Talker Rioter	Episode: "State of Mine"
2019	Chicago P.D.	Blair Williams	Recurring cast: Season 6
2019	For the People	Ted	Main cast: season 2
2020–21	NCIS: New Orleans	Quentin Carter	Main cast: Season 6-7
2022	Legacies	Marcel Gerard	Episode: "Everything That Can Be Lost May Also Be Found"
2026	The Rookie	Dr. Oliver Ashton	Recurring

=== Web series ===
Year	Title	Role	Episode	Notes
2018	Sideswiped	Josh	Deal Breakers	Episode 3

=== Music videos ===
Year	Title	Artist	Notes
2011	Mi Ricordo	J. Ralph	
2020	What's Love Got to Do With It?	Kygo, Tina Turner	
