= ATX Television Festival =

Annual event celebrating the television industry

- Location: Austin, Texas
- Founded: June 1, 2012
- Hosted by: ATX Television Festival LLC
- Language: English
- Website: atxfestival.com

ATX Television Festival is an annual event based in Austin, Texas, that celebrates and showcases the past, present, and future of the television industry. Screenings, Q&As, cast reunions, and industry panel discussions take place over four days and are open to members of the public. The organizers describe it as having "the functionality of a traditional film festival", and as a blending of industry and fan events. The first was held in June 2012, founded by Caitlin McFarland and Emily Gipson. Attendance numbers have risen from 700 at the first festival to 2,500 in 2017. They now work "hand-in-hand with networks and studios that want to bring their talent to promote their programming".

== Festival history ==
=== "Season 1" (2012) ===
The first festival took place from June 1–3, 2012. Special panels included discussions with showrunners Bill Lawrence and Jason Katims, and reunions with cast and crew members of Friday Night Lights, Adult Swim, One Tree Hill, and Love Monkey. Notable screenings with Q&As included Firefly, Parenthood, The Vampire Diaries, Teen Wolf, and Criminal Minds. Industry panels included "TV Fantasy Goes Mainstream", "Women on Television", "Book to TV Series", "Stages of a Television Writing Career" and more.

=== "Season 2" (2013) ===
The second festival took place from June 6–9, 2013. There were panels for the cast and crew of Friday Night Lights, Parenthood, and Husbands, and conversations with showrunners Michael Jacobs, Rob Thomas and Dan Harmon. Notable screenings with Q&As included Boy Meets World, American Dreams, My So Called Life, Once Upon a Time, and Scandal. Among the specialist panels were "Creating the Sound of a Show", "Directing in a Writer’s World", "Face Off: Movies vs. TV presented by Austin Film Festival", "Pitch...Pilot...Pick-Up", and "Structure of a Sitcom...and the Rise of the Anti-Sitcom".

=== "Season 3" (2014) ===
The third festival ran from June 5–8, 2014. It included conversations with actor Henry Winkler and showrunner Carlton Cuse, a panel with the people behind Adult Swim, and a special "15 Year Roswell Reunion" screening with Q&A. Other Q&As included the cast and crew members from Archer, Fargo, Everwood, Justified, Orange is the New Black, The Goldbergs and more. Some of the specialist panels were "Are You Listening?: Fine-tuning the Television Soundtrack", "It’s All So Dramatic: evolution of the tv drama", "Pairing Off: a look at co-creating & writing partners", "Reboot, Remake, Reimagine, or Adapt" and "The Casting Director’s Production".

=== "Season 4" (2015) ===
The fourth festival was held from June 4–7, 2015. Special panels included "Gilmore Girls: 15-year reunion", "Queer as Folk: 15 Year Reunion", "Dream On: 25-year reunion", and "The Evolution of The Simpsons". Additional panels were held with cast and/or crew from The Leftovers, Brooklyn Nine-Nine, Person of Interest, Suits, Dawson's Creek, Empire, and others. There were conversations with showrunners Marta Kauffman, Amy Sherman-Palladino, and James L. Brooks. Industry discussions included "CBS Summer Writers Forum", "Defining Docuseries", "Diversity in Progress", "The Buyers", "The Directors", and "The Devoted Niche vs. The Casual Mass: Is It Really All In the Numbers?" among others.

=== "Season 5" (2016) ===
The fifth festival was held from June 9–12, 2016. Special reunion panels occurred for The West Wing, Ugly Betty, Rescue Me and the writers of The Shield and The OC. Other series with cast and/or crew panels included Younger, Preacher, The Night Shift, Unreal and others. Showrunners who attended for talks included David Simon, Tom Fontana, Norman Lear, Noah Hawley and Beau Willimon. Industry discussions included "Breaking Story: Inside the Room Where It Happens", "Crisis of Faith: Religion & Spirituality on TV", "Development Executives: Business Meets Creative", "Fandom Rising: The Impact of Fan Culture in the Age of Social Media", "The (New) American TV Family" and more.

=== "Season 6" (2017) ===
The sixth festival ran from June 8–11, 2017. The headline event was "Battlestar Galactica Reunion". Other series that had a cast and/or crew panel included This is Us, The Comeback, The Americans, Girls, Sons of Anarchy, Grace & Frankie, GLOW, Northern Exposure, Sneaky Pete, Nashville and more. Industry discussions included "A Network’s Identity: Brave New World or Business As Usual?", "Complex, Not Complicated: A Look at a Woman’s Character", "Directors & Showrunners: A Collaboration", "MTV’s Evolution of Reality presented by MTV" and "Television in a Trumped Up America".

=== "Season 7" (2018) ===
The seventh season was held June 7–10, 2018.

=== "Season 8" (2019) ===
The eighth season was held June 6–9, 2019.

=== "Season 9" (2020) ===
The ninth festival was tagged "...from the couch!" and ran from June 5–7, 2020. Due to a mass national quarantine, the festival was held virtually for the first time. It consisted of a single-track schedule with pre-recorded content that was streamed live on their ATX YouTube channel.

=== "Season 14" (2025) ===
The 14th festival was held from May 29, 2025 to June 1, 2025. One notable event of the festival was a discussion panel which involved details concerning the revival of Texas-based animated classic King of the Hill at the Austin's Paramount Theater on May 30. The panel included King of the Hill alumni Mike Judge, Greg Daniels, Pamela Adlon, Lauren Tom, Toby Huss and new showrunner Saladin Patterson. John Redcorn voice Jonathan Joss, who was later shot and killed on June 1, 2025, was present in the audience, and had previously written on Facebook about his hurt at not being invited to be on the panel: "That character, that voice, that story... they were my home, my pride, my connection to something bigger than myself. To not be invited felt like being shut out of a place I helped build." He was escorted out by the security team.

=== "Season 15" (2026) ===
The fifteenth season was held May 28 - 31, 2026.

== ATX Television Excellence Award winners ==
- Henry Winkler (2014)
- James L. Brooks (2015)
- Norman Lear (2016)
- Marcy Carsey (2018)
- Phylicia Rashad (2019)
- Michael J. Fox (2021)
