= Tessa Albertson =

American actress

- Born: New York City, U.S.
- Education: Princeton University
- Occupation: Actress
- Years active: 2008–present

Tessa Albertson is an American actress. She played Caitlin Miller on the television series Younger.

== Early life ==
Albertson was born in New York City. After high school graduation, she took time off for her acting career before attending Princeton University.

== Career ==
In 2008, Albertson got the role of Alice in the movie Phoebe in Wonderland opposite Elle Fanning and Bailee Madison.

In 2012, she played the role of Isabella in the Henry Alex Rubin's drama movie, Disconnect opposite Jason Bateman and Hope Davis.

In 2014, she starred in the pilot Bambi Cottages beside Molly Shannon and Paul F. Tompkins. She played the role of Veronica Burke. The same year, she was announced in the casting of the new series Younger by Darren Star, the creator of Sex and the City, a sitcom broadcast on TV Land. She plays the role of Caitlin Miller, Liza's daughter.

In 2015, she acted in two movies, including 3 Generations opposite Elle Fanning and Naomi Watts. In 2016, the actress played Tilda in the movie Complete Unknown opposite Michael Shannon and Rachel Weisz. She also acted in the musical Shrek The Musical, playing Princess Fiona. In 2017, Albertson played Alex Faustner in the drama film November Criminals, opposite Chloë Grace Moretz and Ansel Elgort.

In 2023, Albertson starred in the world premiere of the dark comedy I'm Gonna Marry You Tobey Maguire at The Cell Theatre in New York, portraying a lonely eighth-grader who plots to kidnap and marry the Spider-Man 2 star. Albertson will reprise the role in the play's U.K. premiere at Southwark Playhouse in summer 2024.

== Filmography ==
=== Film ===
Year	Title	Role	Director	Notes
2008	Phoebe in Wonderland	Alice	Daniel Barnz	
2012	Disconnect	Isabella	Henry Alex Rubin	
2013	Shrek The Musical	Teen Fiona	Michael John Warren	
2015	3 Generations	Spoon	Gaby Dellal	
2015	The Board	Jenn	David Shane	Short film
2016	Complete Unknown	Tilda	Joshua Marston	
2016	Barry	Tina	Vikram Gandhi	
2017	Blame	Ellie Redgrave	Quinn Shephard	
2017	November Criminals	Alex Faustner	Sacha Gervasi	
2021	Happy Days	Winnie	Nico Krell	

=== Television ===
Year	Title	Role	Notes
2014	Bambi Cottages	Veronica Burke	Television film
2015–21	Younger	Caitlin Miller	Recurring
2016	The Good Wife	Sam	Episode: "Iowa"
2018	Law & Order: Special Victims Unit	Alicia Beck	Episode: "Mea Culpa"
2019	Instinct	Shayla	Episode: "Big Splash"
2019	The Family	Potomac Point Sister	3 episodes
2021	Generation	Natalia	Episode: "Toasted"
