= Peter Hermann (actor) =

American actor (born 1967)

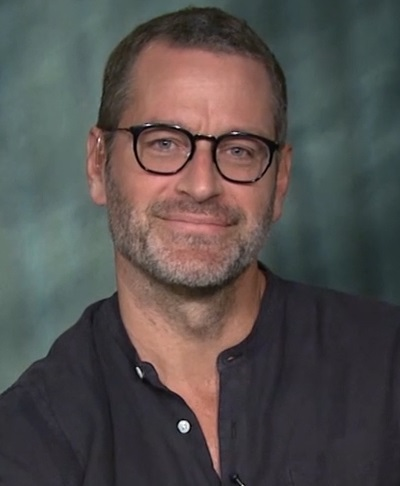
- Hermann in 2019
- Born: August 15, 1967 (age 59); New York City, U.S.
- Education: Yale University
- Occupation: Actor
- Years active: 1997–present
- Spouse: Mariska Hargitay (m. 2004)
- Children: 3

Peter Hermann (born August 15, 1967) is an American actor. He is known for his television roles as Charles Brooks in Younger, Trevor Langan in Law & Order: Special Victims Unit, and Jack Boyle in Blue Bloods.

== Early life ==
Hermann was born in New York City to German parents (Note: Hermann was born to Karl-Ludwig Hermann (1935–2019) and his wife Alex Hermann. Karl-Ludwig Hermann was a businessman and former general manager at Metzler Bank, in Frankfurt, Germany, and managing director at Warburg Paribas Becker Inc. in New York.) and moved to Germany when he was two months old. He lived in Germany until he was 10; he then learned English upon returning to the United States. He attended Yale University. After college, he taught high school English through Teach For America. He also worked as a fact-checker for Vanity Fair.

== Career ==
Hermann had brief stints on a variety of television shows that include the soap opera Guiding Light (1997–1998), the ABC Family show Beautiful People (2006) and the Lifetime original series Angela's Eyes (2006).

Since 2002, Hermann has had a recurring role as defense attorney Trevor Langan on Law & Order: Special Victims Unit.

Hermann has made appearances in several commercials, such as the anti-tobacco "Fair Enough" ads, and has been the face for Persil ProClean detergent since the late 2010s.

In 2006, he starred as Jeremy Glick in the feature film United 93.

Hermann was in the Broadway premiere of Eric Bogosian's Talk Radio, starring Liev Schreiber, and featuring fellow Law & Order: Special Victims Unit cast member Stephanie March. It began performances on February 15, 2007, in preparation for a March 11 opening; its final Broadway performance was on June 24, 2007.

He also guested on 30 Rock during its first season and starred in ABC's mid-season replacement series Cashmere Mafia as Davis Draper. In 2011, he appeared in the Broadway play War Horse, and made occasional appearances as Erin Reagan's ex-husband John "Jack" Boyle on Blue Bloods.

From 2015 to 2021, he starred in Younger. In March 2018, HarperCollins published Hermann's children's book If the S in Moose Comes Loose. He was a guest actor in season 2 of And Just Like That....

== Personal life ==
While appearing on Law & Order: Special Victims Unit, Hermann met lead actress Mariska Hargitay, whom he married on August 28, 2004, in Santa Barbara, California. They have a son. In April 2011, Hargitay and Hermann adopted a baby girl and six months later, the couple adopted a baby boy.

== Filmography ==
=== Film ===
Year	Film	Role	Notes
2002	Swimfan	ER Doctor	
2004	Duane Incarnate	Duane	
2006	The Treatment	Steve	
2006	United 93	Jeremy Glick	
2010	Edge of Darkness	Sanderman	
2010	Just Wright	Dr. Taylor	
2011	Too Big to Fail	Christopher Cox	
2012	Trouble with the Curve	Greg	
2013	Philomena	Pete Olsson	
2013	Chinese Puzzle	John	
2013	All Is Bright	Monsieur Tremblay	
2022	13	Joel Goldman	
2022	Goodnight Mommy	Father	

=== Television ===
Year	Film	Role	Notes
1997–1998	Guiding Light	Dr. Michael Burke	42 episodes
1999	Get Real	David	3 episodes
2000	Law & Order	Al Goran	Episode: "Mega"
2000	Spin City	Ed	Episode: "Don't Get on the Bus"
2002	Hack	Mark Vincenzo	Episode: "Obsession"
2002–2026	Law & Order: Special Victims Unit	Trevor Langan	36 episodes
2003	Sex and the City	David	Episode: "Hop, Skip and a Week"
2003	All My Children	Wayne Kabak	Episode: "August 22, 2003"
2005	Hope & Faith	Brent	Episode: "The Halloween Party"
2006	Beautiful People	Luke Dalton	6 episodes
2006	Standoff	Liam Fowler	Episode: "Shanghai'd"
2006	Angela's Eyes	Peter Wagner	4 episodes
2007	30 Rock	Gray	Episode: "The Head and the Hair"
2008	Cashmere Mafia	Davis Draper	7 episodes
2008	Fringe	Grant	Episode: "The Ghost Network"
2009	Bored to Death	Gary	Episode: "The Alanon Case"
2010	The Good Wife	Judge Derek Shickel	Episode: "Hybristophilia"
2010	White Collar	Willson Mailer	Episode: "Parting Shots"
2011	Curb Your Enthusiasm	Business Manager #2	Episode: "Car Periscope"
2011–2012	A Gifted Man	Harrison Curtis	5 episodes
2012–2024	Blue Bloods	Jack Boyle	Recurring
2013	Elementary	Detective Craig Basken	Episode: "An Unnatural Arrangement"
2015–2021	Younger	Charles Brooks	Series regular
2023	And Just Like That...	George Campbell	Episode: "Trick or Treat"
