= Molly Bernard =

American actress

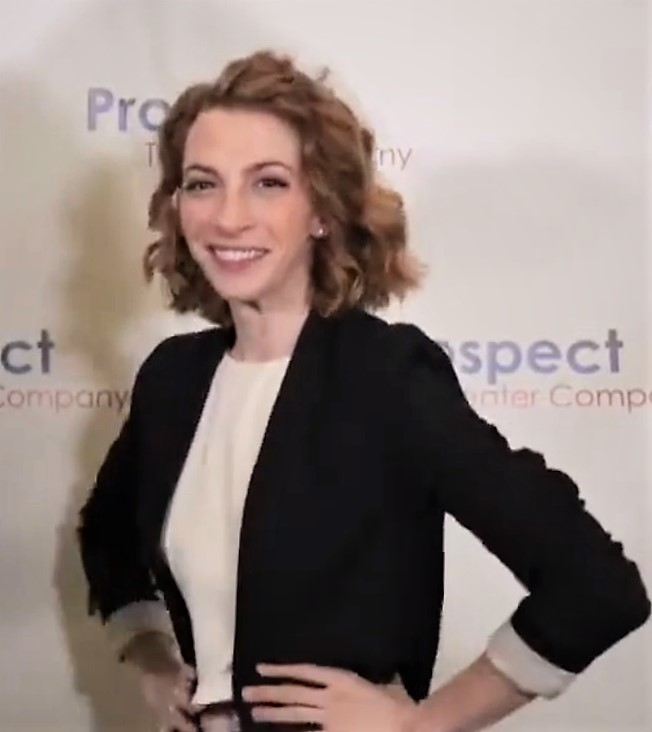
- Bernard in 2018
- Education: Skidmore College; Yale University
- Occupation: Actress
- Years active: 2000–present
- Spouse: Hannah Lieberman (m. 2021)
- Children: 1
- Relatives: Joseph Bernard (grandfather)

Molly Bernard is an American actress. She is known for her portrayal of Lauren Heller in the comedy-drama television series Younger and of Dr. Elsa Curry in seasons 4 and 5 of Chicago Med.

== Life and career ==
Molly Bernard began her career in 2000 in the drama Pay It Forward beside Kevin Spacey and Haley Joel Osment. Her early credits include a recurring role in the television series Alpha House where she played Angie Sullivan. In 2015, Bernard was cast in the television series Younger alongside Sutton Foster and Hilary Duff, where she portrayed Lauren Heller.

The same year, she had a small role in the Nancy Meyers comedy The Intern, beside Robert De Niro and Anne Hathaway. Bernard was cast as Young Shelly, sharing a role with Judith Light in Amazon Prime's Transparent. She appeared in two seasons of the critically acclaimed show. In 2019, she appeared in the comedy Otherhood, a film directed by Cindy Chupack. For two seasons, Bernard has appeared as medical student Elsa Curry in the NBC drama Chicago Med. She has a bachelor's degree from Skidmore College and a MFA in acting from Yale School of Drama.

== Personal life ==
Molly Bernard is the granddaughter of actor Joseph Bernard.

Molly Bernard announced her engagement to girlfriend Hannah Lieberman on Instagram on January 14, 2020. They were married on September 23, 2021, in Prospect Park, Brooklyn, with her Younger co-stars Nico Tortorella and Hilary Duff in attendance. Bernard announced that she was pregnant on her Instagram page in November 2022.

Her daughter was born on January 28, 2023.

== Filmography ==
=== Film ===
Year	Title	Role	Notes
2000	Pay It Forward	Molly	
2006	Wrestling with the Past	Girl Scout	
2015	The Intern	Samantha	
2016	Sully	Alison	
2019	Otherhood	Alison	
2020	Milkwater	Milo	Also executive producer
2023	Hit Man	Alicia	
2024	Dreams in Nightmares	Jamie	

=== Television ===
Year	Title	Role	Notes
2013	Royal Pains	Wendy	Episode: "Chock Full O' Nuts"
2013–2014	Alpha House	Angie Sullivan	Recurring role
2015–2021	Younger	Lauren Heller	Recurring role (season 1); main role (season 2–7)
2016–2017	Transparent	Young Shelly Pfefferman	Recurring role
2016	High Maintenance	Skittish Tenant	Episode: "Ex"
2018	Blindspot	Delilah Dunny	Episode: "Warning Shot"
2018–2020	Chicago Med	Elsa Curry	Recurring role (season 4–5)
2023	The Blacklist	Alex Bostwick; Cordelia Bostwick; Kendall Bostwick	Episode: "The Hyena"
2025	Brilliant Minds	Lauren Brooks	Episode: "The Contestant"
