= Miriam Shor =

American actress (born 1971)

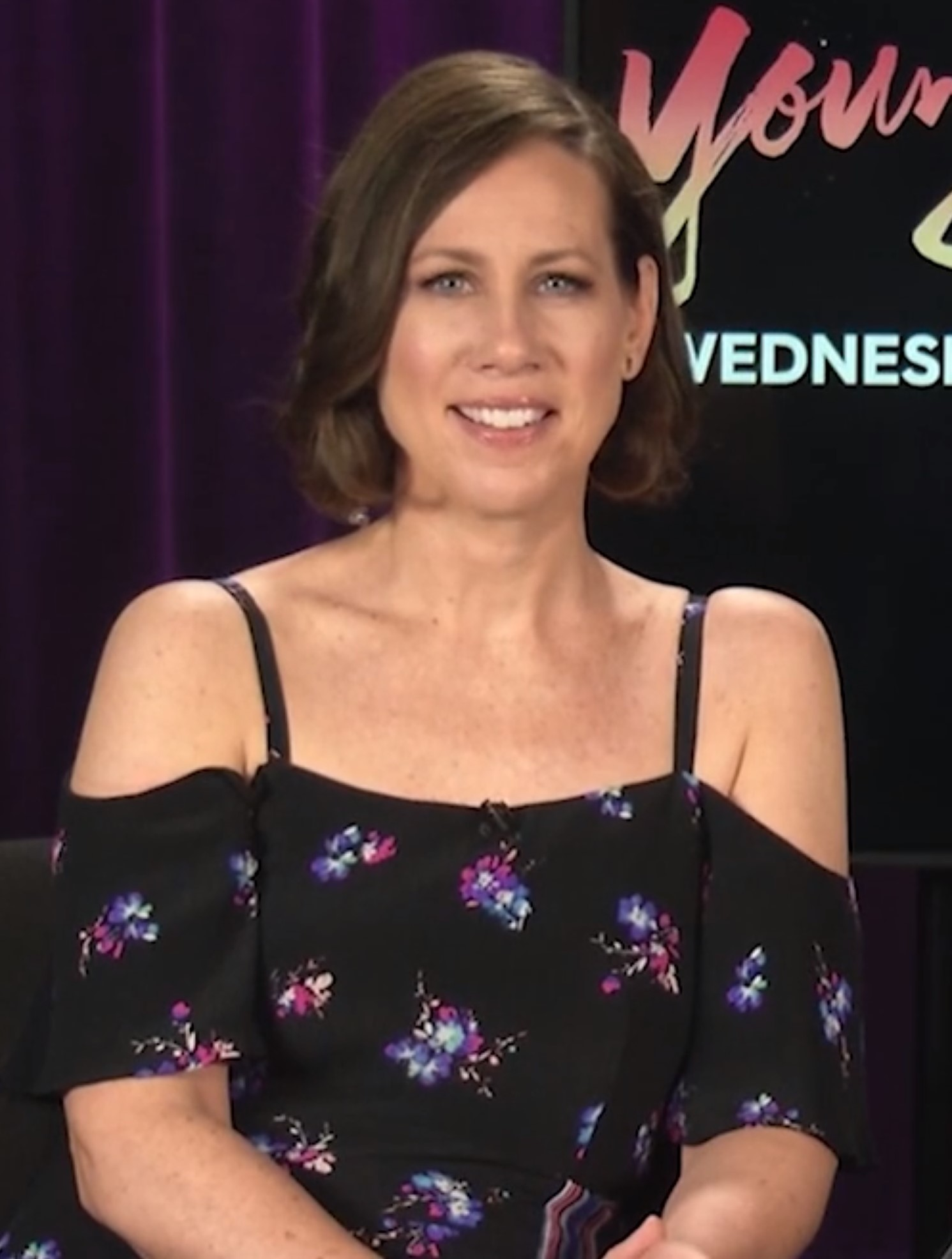
- Shor interviewed on Sidewalks Entertainment about Younger in 2017
- Born: July 25, 1971 (age 55); Minneapolis, Minnesota, U.S.
- Education: University of Michigan (BFA)
- Occupation: Actress
- Years active: 1994–present
- Spouse: Justin Hagan (m. 2009)
- Children: 2

Miriam Shor (born July 25, 1971) is an American actress. She gained prominence for her performance in the Off-Broadway rock musical Hedwig and the Angry Inch (1998–2000) and in the 2001 film adaptation of the same name. She later starred in a number of short-lived television series, including Swingtown (2008) and GCB (2012).

From 2015 to 2021, Shor starred as Diana Trout in the TV Land/Paramount+ comedy-drama series Younger for which she received a Critics' Choice Awards nomination for Best Supporting Actress in a Comedy Series. Shor played Madelaine True in the Encores! production of The Wild Party at the New York City Center in 2015 alongside Younger co-star Sutton Foster. She also has appeared in the films Bedazzled (2000), The Cake Eaters (2007), Lost Girls (2020), Maestro (2023), and American Fiction (2023). For her role in the Apple TV+ series Pluribus, she was nominated for a 2026 Primetime Emmy Award for Outstanding Guest Actress in a Drama Series.

== Early life and education ==
Shor was born on July 25, 1971 in Minneapolis, Minnesota. She has described herself as "half Jewish but not really religious" (her father was Jewish). She grew up both in the US and Italy, Because of her upbringing, she speaks fluent Italian and Yiddish.

She attended the University of Michigan, where she received her Bachelor of Fine Arts in drama.

== Career ==
Shor moved to New York City and began appearing onstage, notably in Hedwig and the Angry Inch. In 2000, she starred in the short-lived sitcom Then Came You. She accepted supporting roles in the Harold Ramis comedy remake Bedazzled (2000) and Hedwig and the Angry Inch (2001), reprising her role of Yitzhak. During the 2001-2002 television season, she starred in the short-lived comedy series Inside Schwartz. Shor later starred in a few independent films and guest-starred on episodes of My Name Is Earl and The West Wing. In 2006, she made an appearance in Shortbus, directed by her Hedwig and the Angry Inch co-star John Cameron Mitchell.

In 2006, Shor starred in the television comedy series Big Day, but the series was canceled after one season. In 2007, Shor had a supporting role to Mary Stuart Masterson's directorial debut, titled The Cake Eaters. The following year, she was cast in the 1970s-set primetime series Swingtown as Janet Thompson. The show was canceled due to mixed reception and low ratings. Shor had a recurring role on Damages as Carrie Parsons and appeared on Law & Order: Criminal Intent, Bored to Death, and Royal Pains. In 2011, she played the role of Anna in miniseries Mildred Pierce.

She appeared in 2012 Broadway Bares with Kyle Dean Massey. In 2012, Shor starred as Cricket Caruth-Reilly in the comedy-drama series GCB, but the series was canceled after one season. Later in 2012, Shor was cast in a recurring role as reporter Mandy Post in season four of The Good Wife.

In 2014, Shor was cast as a series regular in the comedy pilot Younger. The network ordered the show on April 14, 2014, and season one premiered on March 31, 2015. On April 21, 2015, TV Land announced that Younger had been renewed for a second season of 12 episodes, same as the first season. The second season premiered on January 13, 2016. In 2018, she received a Critics' Choice Television Award for Best Supporting Actress in a Comedy Series nomination for her performance. In 2018, she made her directing debut with an episode of Younger.

In 2015, Shor played Madelaine True in The Wild Party at the New York City Center. She had a recurring role as Erica Haskard in the final season of the drama series The Americans. Along with cast, she received Screen Actors Guild Award nomination for Outstanding Performance by an Ensemble in a Drama Series. She later starred in the drama film Lost Girls, which premiered at the Sundance Film Festival on January 28, 2020. She also played a leading role, first in her career, in the comedy-drama film Magic Hour directed by Jacqueline Christy. In 2020, she was cast in the science fiction film Good Morning, Midnight directed by George Clooney and based on the novel of the same name by Lily Brooks-Dalton. In 2023, she played Cynthia O’Neal in the biographical drama film Maestro directed by Bradley Cooper. Also that year, Shor appeared in Guardians of the Galaxy Vol. 3 as Recorder Vim and in the drama film American Fiction. She guest-starred in the HBO Max comedy-drama And Just Like That... playing Amelia Carcy, Miranda's date. In the 2025 sci-fi series Pluribus on AppleTV, Shor had a recurring role as the protagonist's wife, suffering an untimely death. Memories of their time together are captured in a series of flashbacks, causing the character much angst and soul-searching.

In 2026, Shor directed and produced alongside Juliane Dressner My NDA, a documentary film revolving around three people bound by non-disclosure agreements, which had its world premiere at the 2026 South by Southwest Film & TV Festival.

== Personal life ==
Shor is married to actor Justin Hagan. They have two children, Ruby and Iris, born in 2009 and 2013, respectively.

== Acting credits ==
=== Film ===
Year	Title	Role	Notes
1997	Flushed	Stephanie	
1999	Entropy	Blind date	
1999	Let It Snow	Beth	
2000	Bedazzled	Carol	
2001	Hedwig and the Angry Inch	Yitzhak	L.A. Outfest Award for Best Performance by an Actress in a Supporting Role; Nominated – Satellite Award for Best Supporting Actress – Motion Picture; Nominated – Phoenix Film Critics Society Award for Best Supporting Actress
2002	Set Set Spike	Mother	
2003	Second Born	Laura	
2004	Lbs.	Lara Griffin	
2005	Pizza	Vanessa	
2006	Shortbus	Cheryl	
2007	The Cake Eaters	Stephanie	
2008	Puppy Love	Anne	
2012	That's What She Said	Rhoda	
2014	5 Flights Up	Cool lady	
2015	Puerto Ricans in Paris	Sargent Nora	
2018	Before/During/After	Irene	
2020	Lost Girls	Lorraine	
2020	The Midnight Sky	Tom Mitchell's wife	
2023	Guardians of the Galaxy Vol. 3	Recorder Vim	
2023	Maestro	Cynthia O'Neal	
2023	American Fiction	Paula Baderman	
2025	Magic Hour	Harriet Peterson	
2025	The Dinner Plan	Camille	
2026	My NDA	—N/a	Director and producer

=== Television ===
Year	Title	Role	Notes
2000	Becker	Rosie	Episode: "Old Yeller"
2000	Then Came You	Cheryl Sominsky	Main cast; 10 episodes
2001	Deadline	Rachel Blake	Episode: "Just Lie Back"
2001–2002	Inside Schwartz	Julie Hermann	Main cast; 11 episodes
2004	Married to the Kellys	Justin	Episode: "Double Dating"
2005	The West Wing	Christine	Episode: "King Corn"
2006	My Name Is Earl	Gwen Waters	Episode: "BB"
2006–2007	Big Day	Becca	Main cast; 12 episodes
2007	Law & Order: Criminal Intent	Rebecca Slater	Episode: "30"
2007–2010	Damages	Carrie Parsons	5 episodes
2008	Swingtown	Janet Thompson	Main cast; 13 episodes
2009	Bored to Death	Bonnie	Episode: "The Case of the Stolen Sperm"
2011	Mildred Pierce	Anna	Miniseries; 4 episodes
2012	GCB	Cricket Caruth-Reilly	Main cast; 10 episodes
2012–2014	The Good Wife	Mandy Post	6 episodes
2012, 2016	Royal Pains	Fannie Todd	Episodes: "Who's Your Daddy" and "The Good News Is..."
2015–2021	Younger	Diana Trout	Main cast Director, 2 episodes Nominated — Critics' Choice Television Award for Best Supporting Actress in a Comedy Series (2018)
2015	Jessica Jones	Alisa Jones	Episode: "AKA WWJD?"
2016	Elementary	Jennifer Bader	Episode: "Ready or Not"
2016, 2018	High Maintenance	Renee	Episodes: "Museebat" and "HBD"
2017	Broad City	Crying neighbor	Episode: "Just the Tips"
2018	The Americans	Erica Haskard	6 episodes Nominated — Screen Actors Guild Award for Outstanding Performance by an Ensemble in a Drama Series
2020	Mrs. America	Natalie Gittelson	Episodes: "Betty"
2023	And Just Like That...	Amelia Carcy	Episode: "February 14th"
2024	Before	Sue Ann	4 episodes
2025	Pluribus	Helen L. Umstead	Episodes: "We Is Us", "Pirate Lady", and "Grenade"; Nominated — Primetime Emmy Award for Outstanding Guest Actress in a Drama Series

=== Theater ===
Year	Title	Role	Notes
1998–2000	Hedwig and the Angry Inch	Yitzhak	Jane Street Theatre
2002	Book of Days	Ruth Hoch	Peter Norton Space Theatre
2002	Merrily We Roll Along	Mary Flynn	Kennedy Center
2003	Mondo Drama		Greenwich House Pottery
2004	Boy		Primary Stages
2005	Dedication or The Stuff of Dreams	Ida Head	59E59 Theater A
2006	Almost, Maine	Sandrine/Marvalyn/Marci/Rhonda	Daryl Roth Theatre
2007	Scarcity	Gloria	Linda Gross Theater
2015	The Wild Party	Madelaine True	New York City Center
2016–2017	Sweat	Jessie	The Public Theater; Studio 54

=== Video games ===
Year	Title	Role	Notes
2007	BioShock	Diane McClintock	Voice

== Awards and nominations ==
Year	Association	Category	Work	Result
2001	Satellite Awards	Best Supporting Actress – Motion Picture	Hedwig and the Angry Inch	Nominated
2001	L.A. Outfest Award	Best Performance by an Actress in a Supporting Role	Hedwig and the Angry Inch	Won
2001	Phoenix Film Critic's Society Awards	Best Supporting Actress	Hedwig and the Angry Inch	Nominated
2017	AUDELCO Award	Outstanding Ensemble Performance	Sweat	Nominated
2019	Critics' Choice Television Awards	Best Supporting Actress in a Comedy Series	Younger	Nominated
2019	Actor Awards	Outstanding Performance by an Ensemble in a Drama Series	The Americans	Nominated
2026	Primetime Emmy Awards	Outstanding Guest Actress in a Drama Series	Pluribus	Nominated
