= Blue Bloods season 7 =

Season of television series

Blue Bloods
- Season 7
- Season 7 U.S. DVD cover
- No. of episodes: 22

Release
- Original network: CBS
- Original release: September 23, 2016 – May 5, 2017

Season chronology
- ← Previous; Season 6 Next → Season 8

The seventh season of Blue Bloods, a police procedural drama series created by Robin Green and Mitchell Burgess, premiered on CBS September 23, 2016. The season concluded on May 5, 2017.

== Cast ==
=== Main ===
- Tom Selleck as NYPD Police Commissioner Francis "Frank" Reagan
- Donnie Wahlberg as Detective 1st Grade Daniel "Danny" Reagan
- Bridget Moynahan as ADA Erin Reagan
- Will Estes as Officer Jamison "Jamie" Reagan
- Len Cariou as New York City Police Commissioner Henry Reagan (Retired)
- Amy Carlson as Linda Reagan
- Sami Gayle as Nicole "Nicky" Reagan-Boyle
- Marisa Ramirez as Detective 1st Grade Maria Baez
- Vanessa Ray as Officer Edit "Eddie" Janko

=== Recurring ===
- Abigail Hawk as Detective 1st Grade Abigail Baker
- Gregory Jbara as Deputy Commissioner of Public Information Garrett Moore
- Robert Clohessy as Lieutenant Sidney "Sid" Gormley
- Steve Schirripa as DA Investigator Anthony Abetemarco
- Peter Hermann as Jack Boyle
- Ato Essandoh as Reverend Darnell Potter
- Tony Terraciano as Jack Reagan
- Andrew Terraciano as Sean Regan
- Treat Williams as Lenny Ross
- Stacy Keach as Archbishop Kearns

== Episodes ==
No. overall	No. in season	Title	Directed by	Written by	Original release date	Prod. code	U.S. viewers (millions)
134	1	"The Greater Good"	David M. Barrett	Siobhan Byrne-O'Connor	September 23, 2016	701	10.55
Danny's world is rocked when Robert Lewis (Michael Imperioli) in the Attorney General's office obtains new evidence against him in the self-defense shooting case of serial killer Thomas Wilder (Louis Cancelmi). In a hearing, Lewis confronts Danny over whether he shot Wilder in cold blood out of revenge; in response, Danny demonstrates how Wilder goaded Danny into shooting by revealing his hands quickly, backing up his reasoning for shooting Wilder. Danny is later cleared of all charges. Also, Jamie and Eddie respond to a car accident involving congressman Russ Anderson, whose blood-alcohol content was well over the legal limit. His associate claims he was driving instead of Anderson, but thanks to Jamie's idea to get DNA evidence from the airbags at the time of the accident, the officers arrest Anderson during his political rally. Frank is asked by Grace Edwards (Lori Loughlin), the wife of a slain police officer, to keep her only son off the police force for his safety. The young man insists to Frank that he's only ever wanted to be a cop, and Frank decides not to stand in his way, deeply angering Grace.
135	2	"Good Cop Bad Cop"	Kellie Cyrus	Brian Burns	September 30, 2016	704	10.56
Danny and Baez investigate the murder of an elderly woman, shot in her home by a stray bullet fired from a gun owned by a gang leader named Roxy (Felicia Pearson). Danny obtains evidence of Roxy firing the gun via a social media site where the videos disappear after 48 hours (an idea Danny got from an unrelated matter involving his son Jack, who ditched school to drink at a party where a video was taken of him using the same website). The 14-year old who took the video is then shot at by Roxy, whose lawyer tries to hide Roxy from Danny at his house, to no avail. Also, Frank faces ridicule from his department when he disciplines a disrespectful cop, Officer Clark. Clark responds by creating insulting charicature of Frank, and voicing his intent to transfer to Nassau County. Elsewhere, Erin steps in to help her detective cohort, Anthony Abetemarco (Steve Schirripa), find a legal solution for his mother, who has Alzheimer's, after a con man named Frankie bilks her out of her life savings. She has Henry pose as just another old man with Alzheimer's to meet with Frankie for lunch in order for him to incriminate himself via a wire, but Henry's cover is unwittingly blown by an old friend. Although Frankie is not yet captured, Henry visits Anthony with a check equalling the life savings of Anthony's mother, personally written by the CEO of her bank (who happens to be a friend of Henry's).
136	3	"The Price of Justice"	John Behring	Ian Biederman	October 7, 2016	702	9.85
Danny and Baez are determined to get justice for a traumatized young woman, Emily Harrison, who was held hostage and raped, despite her resistance to press charges. They are unable to come up with enough solid evidence to convict their prime suspect, Emily's now ex-boyfriend Brandon Mitchell, and he is cut loose. Due to Baez and Erin's urging to nail Mitchell, Danny has Emily goad Mitchell into raping her with him being wired, but the perp sees through the scheme and is able to walk free again. Also, Frank deals with a PR nightmare when a prominent NYPD donor (Saul Rubinek) is spotted speeding through Manhattan traffic in a fake police vehicle. Meanwhile, Jamie and Eddie are assigned to shadow a TV crime show where the technical advisor claims to have worked as an NYPD officer. Jamie quickly realizes that the writers have no idea how cops actually work and finds himself at odds with them over making the show more realistic and believable. He also discovers that the tech advisor lied about being a cop (unknown to the showrunner, who fires him for sexually harassing the extras). The showrunner then offers Jamie the newly opened tech advisor position, and Jamie promptly turns him down.
137	4	"Mob Rules"	Robert Harmon	Peter Blauner	October 14, 2016	703	10.22
Intent on winning justice for Lieutenant Gormley after he is beaten senseless by a gang outside his temporary rental home, Anthony offers to help Frank because he has a personal connection to the neighborhood where the attack occurred: his Aunt Sophie, from whom he has been estranged since locking up his cousin Joey (see 6x17 "Friends in Need"). He is unable to get her to talk to her neighbors or give any of them up, but after bringing in the mob leader on a petty charge, Erin is able to get him to confess and rat out his crew, something he has done numerous times before. Also, Eddie and Jamie witness a dishonest arrest involving an NYPD detective and a corrupt agent from Homeland Security who say they're part of an anti-terrorism task force. They nearly take out an undocumented Syrian man in a road rage incident and mercilessly pin the blame on him. Jamie asks Frank what he can do about the situation, which turns out to be nothing, even after the wrongfully imprisoned is beaten up at Rikers for looking Middle Eastern. Frank then expresses concern that Jamie expects the most out of himself and always wants things to turn out right, saying it may completely eat at him over time. Danny and Maria search for a witness to testify against a dangerous gang leader. Danny bonds with Fausto, a disabled man in a wheelchair (portrayed by Michael DeLorenzo), and is able to coerce him into testifying, only to learn he changed his mind after the gang leader threatened him several times. Ultimately, the witness shoots the gang leader in the back in front of the detectives.
138	5	"For the Community"	Peter Werner	Teleplay by : Blair Singer & Kevin Wade; Story by : Blair Singer	October 21, 2016	705	10.03
Erin and Anthony try to prevent the deportation of a prominent community activist, Coryna Garza (Judy Reyes), who has a lengthy record and, against her knowledge, is not a citizen. Erin's boss orders her to drop the case, but she visits Garza's ex-husband on her own time to convince him to testify on her behalf or else go to jail for hindering prosecution. Frank must decide if the NYPD will participate in the U.S. Marshals' high-profile raid of a local gang. Marshal Morgan, who has been a thorn in the Reagans' side before, tries to strongarm Frank into helping him on the raid; despite several casualties and questionable arrests, the raid is successful in taking criminals off the streets. Elsewhere, Eddie takes Jamie to see her 16-year-old psychic, Adriana, but the girl's "papa" says she has disappeared. When they find the girl, Jamie and Eddie try to figure out why she ran; the "papa" is revealed to have been using Adriana for a scam to line his own pockets, and Adriana assumes another alias with a different "papa" to get away from the scammer.
139	6	"Whistleblowers"	Eric Laneuville	Kevin Riley and Kevin Wade	October 28, 2016	706	8.88
Frank is informed of a whistleblower within the NYPD, Officer Carlson, who claims to have evidence of abuse of power in high crime neighborhoods. Carlson's C.O. enrolls him in a psychiatric ward to paint him in a worse light than he sees him in, but it is revealed that Carlson is telling the truth and the C.O. is one of the ones responsible for the abuse of power. Danny and Baez investigate the case of a waitress at a popular Irish pub who was struck by a car under suspicious circumstances. She had an extreme amount of cocaine with W-18 in her system, and her colleague points toward the boyfriend; while he is indeed guilty of drug offenses, his dealer is the one responsible for pumping the victim up with the drugs. Erin's boss asks her to close a case for a colleague laid up in the hospital in which the accused (a woman) pled guilty to 200 counts of possession of child pornography. Her lawyer pleads insanity, and Erin asks the woman's doctor for testimony in court; despite this, the accused did not report her crimes or seek help in the right frame of mind, leading the judge to impose the maximum six-year prison sentence.
140	7	"Guilt by Association"	Robert Harmon	Siobhan Byrne O'Connor	November 4, 2016	707	9.76
When a key witness in Danny's murder case is killed just before testifying, Erin angers Danny by enlisting Anthony to help him find additional evidence to collar the murderer. Danny and Anthony begrudgingly work together, but their mutual disdain for each other is evident even after solving the case. Robert Lewis returns, trying to force Frank to publicly support the Attorney General's investigation into the use of excessive force by police. During a joint press conference with Lewis, Frank accuses him of having political motivations for the probe. Lewis responds later by promising further investigations into NYPD chain of evidence issues. Meanwhile, Eddie and Jamie get a call for an attempted suicide. The man, Mike, is distraught over his girlfriend dumping him soon before their wedding; Jamie successfully talks him down after opening up about his ended engagement to Sydney while Eddie talks to the girlfriend. Mike is released from the hospital on his own recognizance, but he subsequently beats his girlfriend to death with a baseball bat, making Jamie feel at fault, since he originally tried to convince Mike to patch things up with her.
141	8	"Personal Business"	David M. Barrett	Ian Biederman	November 11, 2016	708	10.27
After Emily Harrison (Danielle Savre, see 7x03 "The Price of Justice") tells Danny and Baez she's concerned her abusive ex-boyfriend, Brandon Mitchell, will repeat his behavior with his new girlfriend, Emily is accused of vigilantism when the guy is murdered. The new girlfriend insists that Emily killed Brandon in cold blood, but Erin gets her old friend, a high-profile lawyer who represented Mitchell previously, to represent Emily and prove she acted in self-defense. Elsewhere, Eddie gets jealous when Jamie takes in a young professional woman who was forced to live on the street, letting her crash at his apartment. After Jamie gets the woman a place of her own with the help from her boss, Eddie visits Jamie at his apartment and finally confesses her feelings for him. Jamie reveals he feels the same way, but they agree to keep their relationship professional to avoid getting new partners; however, Eddie kisses him before leaving. Meanwhile, Frank must decide how to discipline a sergeant after he fails to intercede during an armed robbery while off duty, as he was protecting his young daughter. The sergeant winds up in the hospital after responding to a call without backup while on modified assignment, and Frank ultimately decides not to prepare charges against the sergeant, believing that family comes first.
142	9	"Confessions"	Alex Zakrzewski	Brian Burns	November 18, 2016	709	10.36
Frank is left with minimal information to find a missing boy when a conflicted priest who could help won't break the seal of confession. After continuously asking the priest and even going to the archbishop for help, Frank is able to get the information he needs without the priest having to break the seal. Danny and Baez investigate the death of a prominent New York City socialite, Lindsey Wentworth, with a secret life as a high-end escort. The detectives initially suspect one of her clients, whose alibi checks out. Danny is able to obtain overhead camera footage from one of his old friends who works for the Feds, which incriminates Lindsey's husband as the killer. Elsewhere, Jamie and Eddie attend a wedding together while trying to hide their recently resurfaced romantic feelings for each other. Unfortunately, one of the guests at the reception, who began hitting on Eddie and insulted Jamie and the rest of the NYPD before the wedding, takes a swing at Jamie which leads to a brawl on the dance floor and a destroyed wedding cake. Those involved spend the night in the slammer; the morning after, Eddie expresses frustration that Jamie never follows through with wanting to progress in their relationship, but Jamie later makes it up to her by inviting her to share a romantic slow dance with him.
143	10	"Unbearable Loss"	David M. Barrett	Peter Blauner	December 9, 2016	710	10.18
When the son of Frank's most outspoken critic in the African-American community, Reverend Darnell Potter (Ato Essandoh), is killed, Potter must put aside his contentious relationship with the Reagan family in order to get justice for his son. Initially, Potter gets in the way of the investigation by zealously bringing in several people he thinks could've had something to do with his son's death and butting heads with Frank and Danny over things said and misunderstood, but the guilty party is someone Potter is least expecting: a young man he had tried to mentor in the past. Potter then makes peace with Frank after the latter pays him a personal visit. Also, Erin and Anthony investigate when a convicted felon's cause of death is inconsistent with injuries she sustained during a prisoner transport van accident; the van owner, who makes sleazy passes at Erin, is responsible for a cover-up to save his business and his reputation. Jamie learns that a mugger he shot in self-defense is the son of a trooper in the New York State Police. Eddie is worried when the captain angrily asks for Jamie in the precinct. Jamie meets with the captain, who apologizes to Jamie for the circumstances.
144	11	"Genetics"	Alex Chapple	Allie Solomon	January 6, 2017	711	10.79
An adoption case gets complicated for Jamie and Eddie, so they turn to Erin for help in preventing the case from going to court. The case becomes more complicated because Erin does not know adoption law well, nor does she particularly like it, calling it an "emotional minefield." The birth parents file for custody, and they may actually have a case when it is revealed that the adoptive father filed to separate from his wife and failed to notify their case worker. The adoptive mother goes to great lengths to keep custody herself, forcing Erin and Anthony to rush to the airport before she kidnaps the boy. Erin also deals with a personal issue at home when Nicky would rather go out with friends than go to dinner with her father, later revealing she would like to spend time with family because she wants to, not because she has to. Frank deals with an NYPD sergeant who is helping cadets from military backgrounds cheat on the psychiatric portion of their exam. The sergeant accuses the psych exam of being rigged, and Gormley promptly reassigns him. Frank meets with the 32 that have similarly cheated on the psych exam in the past for an honest re-do. Meanwhile, Danny learns from a worried Linda that Jack plans to enter the Marines after graduation. Danny takes Jack to a Marine training facility to show him what that would be like; Jack ultimately changes his mind, intending to go to college instead.
145	12	"Not Fade Away"	Robert Harmon	Kevin Wade and Blair Singer	January 13, 2017	712	10.48
Danny is asked to provide private security for Ernie "Goodnight" Mason (Omar Dorsey), who spent 12 years in prison for his involvement in a murder. In return, Danny makes Mason help him locate the actual triggerman in the crime. Mason eventually agrees to meet with the shooter to get him to confess on a wire, but his associate slices Mason's throat before Danny has a chance to apprehend them. Jamie and Eddie have to break up a public quarrel between two NYPD partners who have become romantically involved, making them evaluate their own complicated relationship. The partners threaten to out Jamie and Eddie's attraction, even though they are not together. Jamie and Eddie ultimately decide to officially remain professional partners and put aside whatever spark they have. Elsewhere, Frank tries to make things right when Sid's wife tells him that her husband feels undervalued, but he is visited by husband and wife to clear the air; Gormley says he is happy where he is and that his wife made a big deal over nothing. Also, Frank reluctantly celebrates his birthday.
146	13	"The One That Got Away"	Jane Raab	Siobhan Byrne O'Connor	January 20, 2017	713	9.77
When diplomatic immunity complicates a child abuse case for Danny and Baez, Frank intervenes, despite not having jurisdiction on the case. The child's father beats him until he winds up in the hospital, and the boy even tells the detectives his father is the one responsible; ultimately, the mother shoots her husband in front of the cops before saying she also has diplomatic immunity. Also, a robbery occurs while Eddie and Jamie are on a double date with Eddie's boyfriend and his sister, and they are forced to step in. Eddie's boyfriend subsequently breaks up with her, feeling like her job makes him feel inferior in the relationship, and Jamie comforts a hurt Eddie by praising her personally and professionally. Meanwhile, Angela Ferraro, Joe's old girlfriend, returns with news she is getting married and invites the Reagan family, giving Frank suspicions about the invite.
147	14	"In & Out"	John Behring	Ian Biederman	February 3, 2017	714	10.13
A parole officer's sleazy affair with an ex-con leads to a possible cover up in a gang leader's shooting. Danny and Baez force the parole officer to give up her lover on a wire if she doesn't want to get jammed up for hindering prosecution, but the gang member sees through the scheme and kills her. Meanwhile, Frank tries to prevent further violence by getting information from the rival gang leader, Mario Hunt (Method Man), serving prison time for killing police chief Donald Kent. Garrett and Gormley advise against meeting with Mario Hunt to begin with; Hunt offers to end the war between the gangs in exchange for immediately commuting the remainder of his sentence to federal prison. Frank instead gives Hunt an ultimatum with 10 seconds to decide: end the gang war and finish his sentence in New York, or don't and commute to Atlanta, where the rival gang runs things (Hunt refuses to cooperate). Elsewhere, Jamie and Eddie are tired of responding to bogus calls, and try to track down the person who has tapped into the police frequency. Their initial suspect, a young man who calls himself "Shadow", is found innocent, but he holds a grudge against cops. Having a change of heart, he eventually points the officers toward the real criminals and helps to take them down before Eddie and Jamie encourage him to join the NYPD's intelligence division as a civilian analyst in the future.
148	15	"Lost Souls"	Alex Chapple	Brian Burns	February 10, 2017	715	10.65
A man is murdered 10 years after he killed a mother and son while driving drunk, and the investigation leaves Danny and Baez facing a dilemma; bring the murderer to justice or turn the other cheek, as the killer is the patriarch of the family killed in the crash. Erin asks a hesitant Anthony to wear a wire as he meets with an old friend who has become involved with Russian mobsters; he eventually complies, but instead of arresting him, Anthony convinces him to incriminate the mob leaders in an effort to protect him. Meanwhile, Frank learns the NYPD community feels that he is the only thing holding Jamie back from a promotion. However, a talk between father and son reveals that Jamie is content working on the beat, feeling he is more important in stopping bad things from happening rather than "cleaning up afterwards," as Jamie puts it.
149	16	"Hard Bargain"	David M. Barrett	Peter Blauner	February 17, 2017	716	10.15
Linda's estranged brother Jimmy (Kevin Dillon) asks Danny for help after he lands in trouble with the mob. The mobsters tell Danny they'll leave him and his family alone if Jimmy confesses to double-crossing them, but Danny instinctively turns around and starts driving Jimmy to the airport. Jimmy forces Danny to take him to the mobsters in order to protect Danny's family, which leads to a severely beaten Jimmy being hospitalized, but still alive. Elsewhere, Frank deals with a PR nightmare when a lawyer whose pop star client, Osvaldo V, was tackled and arrested in a case of mistaken identity wants police officers' disciplinary records to be made public. Also, Nicky accompanies Jamie and Eddie on a ride along, and gets involved when the three encounter a battered wife. Her attempts to help cause the patriarch of the family to threaten Jamie with legal action if Nicky doesn't leave the family alone, but things completely boil over when the elder son is arrested for beating his father while defending the woman.
150	17	"Shadow of a Doubt"	P.J. Pesce	Kevin Riley	March 10, 2017	717	9.36
Jamie and Eddie suspect foul play when they respond to a distress call from a woman having what is presumed to be an allergic reaction to her lifesaving medication that later kills her, and learn that her husband is an EMT assigned to take her call, but didn't respond. Jamie asks an already overworked Danny to investigate, and it is revealed that the EMT was having an affair, and the girlfriend is responsible for switching the wife's meds leading to a heart attack, which was the official cause of death listed on the autopsy. Afterwards, Danny isn't convinced Jamie wants to stay on patrol rather than become a detective, but he promises to support his brother no matter what. Also, Erin realizes that a man she convicted a decade earlier, Matthew Kindler, might be innocent of the crime; Erin's boss wants to make sure Kindler, who is mentally challenged, stays locked up. Further complicating matters is the fact that Kindler consistently threatened Erin while locked up. Erin testifies on Kindler's behalf, and he gives Erin the journals he wrote as thanks (with Erin initially assuming he was going to attack her). Elsewhere, Frank handles a PR crisis in his department when an exposé on Garrett Moore is published, saying he accepts money for favors and bribes. Frank forces him to hold a press conference where he vows to pay back the favors he owes.
151	18	"A Deep Blue Goodbye"	David Barrett	Kevin Wade	March 31, 2017	718	9.62
Danny investigates the circumstances of an ex-NYPD officer who goes missing the day after she revealed to him that she had planned to make amends to the woman she and her partner wrongfully convicted years ago. The partners had an argument over the ordeal: Ellen adamantly wants to meet with the wrongfully convicted, while Russ, a recently promoted detective, wants to just let it go. After Ellen's body is found, the convict she was to meet with points toward a couple known as "Sun-Up" & "Sundown", and they happen upon the detectives in an elevator. All 4 pull guns at the same time, and a shootout ensues that kills the criminals, but not before the man gives up "Hotel Hate," which Danny initially misinterprets as "Motel 8." Russ is reluctant to report everything to Internal Affairs (which Danny advises him to do), but he eventually does and is placed on modified assignment, and he steps up to care for Ellen's teenage son. Elsewhere, Frank faces a dilemma when one of his peers, Chief Travis Jackson (Isaiah Washington), refuses to retire, even though he's hit the mandatory age. Jackson files an age-discrimination lawsuit in an effort to stay on the job and later gets injured on a raid. Ultimately, although he still vows to carry out his lawsuit, Frank has several officers escort him out in a hero's sendoff. Also, Jamie and Eddie get involved in a prank war with another male-female officer partnership, which escalates to a near-brawl in the street. As punishment, the two sets of partners are temporarily split up.
152	19	"Love Lost"	Ralph Hemecker	Siobhan Byrne O'Connor	April 7, 2017	719	9.77
Once again, Erin faces off in court against her ex-husband, Jack Boyle (Peter Hermann), who is representing the person she is attempting to convict of murder. Erin is also shocked to learn that Jack has been going out with a woman who is just a few years older than Nicky. Jack also hasn't gotten over the habit of calling Erin by her marriage name. She loses the case and is visited by the defendant, who makes threats against her while she is having drinks with Danny. Danny and Baez investigate to see if a husband is behind the murder of his own wife, who was smothered in her sleep; she is revealed to have been dying slowly and painfully from an illness, and he committed the act to end her suffering. Frank is confronted by a mother, Shelly Wayne (Cassandra Freeman), who accuses the NYPD of being negligent in solving her son's murder. She also personally accuses Frank of not knowing what it's like to lose a child (even though Frank lost Joe), but Frank then visits her church as a peace offering. Meanwhile, Jamie rides with his temporary partner, Officer Brenda Patimkin (Sarah Mezzanotte). After they arrest a man on drug charges, Patimkin, a rookie, accidentally lets the junkie escape, much to Jamie's chagrin. She then opens up to Jamie about some of her family members' addictions and records with the police, saying she omitted it from her application to the NYPD (revealing the reason for her previously working with IAB), and they find some common ground.
153	20	"No Retreat, No Surrender"	Jane Raab	Brian Burns	April 14, 2017	720	9.43
When a witness in a former case of Erin's demands to pay up for the debt she owes him from the past, she pays up by shutting down a drug operation in his Bronx apartment building, to make it safe for his family. The man refuses to testify after initially agreeing to do so, out of fear for his son's life, and Erin is able to convince several of his neighbors to turn against the drug criminals in the area as well. While investigating a teen's suicide, Danny and Baez uncover information that suggests the death was a homicide. The boy's mother pins the blame on several of his peers who she said was trying to recruit him into the thug life, but the mother, who has had a history of abusing her son, killed him and staged it to look like suicide. Elsewhere, the son of one of the mayor's top donors was released without bail after breaking a cop's nose in a bar fight, with the mayor himself calling the judge. The officer declines to press charges, forcing Frank to present the matter to the Attorney General, possibly putting his job at risk.
154	21	"Foreign Interference"	John Behring	Peter Blauner	April 28, 2017	721	8.74
Danny and Baez team up with two Russian operatives to search for a dangerous Russian man, Rambo, who entered the U.S. on a diplomatic visa. The agents pester Danny and Baez by repeatedly withholding information and letting Rambo escape after a shootout ensues, but Danny is finally able to corner and kill Rambo in a sauna. Also, Frank gets involved in two sensitive cases involving Archbishop Kevin Kearns (Stacy Keach). Two foreign men (one Christian and one Muslim) are arrested after a fight in a bagel shop during which each claim the other pulled a knife first; Kearns posts bail for the Christian. In an unrelated matter, Kearns asks Frank to pull some strings to get a dying officer, Macklin, compensation for his disease being related to 9/11, but he was a heavy drinker and smoker. Frank uses the fight case as leverage, giving Kearns an ultimatum to post bail for the Muslim as well, only for Kearns to also request for Macklin be promoted to detective first grade for extra compensation for his family. They then agree on a compromise. Erin and Anthony scramble to find out who tampered with evidence in one of their cases. Erin initially suspects the original detective, who vouchered for the evidence on camera, but he angrily denies and advises to "get your own house in order," pointing Erin towards Gary, a former prosecutor and mentor who had a drug addiction. This act puts the cases Gary closed in jeopardy of being re-opened, but he says under oath that he never knowingly planted or tampered with evidence.
155	22	"The Thin Blue Line"	David M. Barrett	Ian Biederman	May 5, 2017	722	9.24
Danny and Baez are forced to work with a federal agent when a shipment of money intended for a Mexican drug cartel makes its way to New York. They work together to bring down the cartel and recover the heroin, but Danny wants to seize the money shipment from a cartel member, Pena, as well. Erin refuses to give him a warrant, but Danny intercepts the cash and arrests Pena anyway, running afoul of the FBI, who reveal Pena was a confidential informant for them. Afterwards, Danny and his family become targets when cartel members come back for revenge; they firebomb Danny's house, leaving the family houseless. Also, Jamie is one of several cops questioning anyone and everyone trying to come up with information regarding a serial killer who preys on the elderly, but his hesitance to resort to methods similar to enhanced interrogation draws the ire of a supervisor, who cruelly tells him if he was more like Danny, he wouldn't still be walking the beat. A man rushes to inform Jamie about two more murders, but Jamie suspects him after he had waited 20 minutes and seemed to rehearse what he was going to report. Following his instinct, Jamie catches him just before he was going to carry out another hit. The killer confesses to the act, but in his twisted mind, he was "ending their pain," even though they were all proven to be in good health. During the manhunt for the serial killer, Mayor Poole (David Ramsey) personally attacks Frank for not catching the guilty party, then skips a press conference to cover his own skin. Frank goes to meet with Poole so he can offer to step down since Poole appears to have lost his confidence in the NYPD, but Poole says he will officially resign instead.

== Ratings ==
Viewership and ratings per episode of Blue Bloods season 7
No.	Title	Air date	Rating/share (18–49)	Viewers (millions)	DVR (18–49)	DVR viewers (millions)	Total (18–49)	Total viewers (millions)
1	"The Greater Good"	September 23, 2016	1.3/6	10.55	0.8	4.32	2.1	14.87
2	"Good Cop Bad Cop"	September 30, 2016	1.3/6	10.56	—N/a	4.00	—N/a	14.56
3	"The Price of Justice"	October 7, 2016	1.2/5	9.85	0.7	3.90	1.9	13.73
4	"Mob Rules"	October 14, 2016	1.3/5	10.22	—N/a	3.99	—N/a	14.21
5	"For the Community"	October 21, 2016	1.1/5	10.03	0.8	4.02	1.9	14.06
6	"Whistleblowers"	October 28, 2016	1.1/4	8.88	0.7	4.40	1.8	13.28
7	"Guilt by Association"	November 4, 2016	1.1/4	9.76	0.7	4.12	1.8	13.88
8	"Personal Business"	November 11, 2016	1.3/5	10.27	0.7	4.04	2.0	14.31
9	"Confessions"	November 18, 2016	1.2/5	10.36	0.7	4.36	1.9	14.72
10	"Unbearable Loss"	December 9, 2016	1.2/5	10.18	0.7	4.35	1.9	14.53
11	"Genetics"	January 6, 2017	1.3/4	10.79	0.7	4.19	2.0	14.97
12	"Not Fade Away"	January 13, 2017	1.3/5	10.48	0.7	4.00	2.0	14.48
13	"The One That Got Away"	January 20, 2017	1.2/5	9.77	0.7	4.31	1.9	14.08
14	"In & Out"	February 3, 2017	1.1/5	10.13	0.8	4.35	1.9	14.48
15	"Lost Souls"	February 10, 2017	1.2/5	10.65	—N/a	4.23	—N/a	14.89
16	"Hard Bargain"	February 17, 2017	1.1/4	10.15	0.7	3.85	1.8	14.00
17	"Shadow of a Doubt"	March 10, 2017	1.0/4	9.36	0.8	4.36	1.8	13.79
18	"A Deep Blue Goodbye"	March 31, 2017	1.1/4	9.62	0.7	4.19	1.8	13.81
19	"Love Lost"	April 7, 2017	1.0/4	9.77	0.6	4.06	1.6	13.83
20	"No Retreat No Surrender"	April 14, 2017	1.0/4	9.43	0.6	3.61	1.6	13.04
21	"Foreign Interference"	April 28, 2017	0.8/3	8.74	—N/a	3.52	—N/a	12.26
22	"The Thin Blue Line"	May 5, 2017	1.0/4	9.24	0.6	3.93	1.6	13.17
