= Blue Bloods season 6 =

Season of American television series Blue Bloods

Blue Bloods
- Season 6
- Region 1 DVD cover art
- No. of episodes: 22

Release
- Original network: CBS
- Original release: September 25, 2015 – May 6, 2016

Season chronology
- ← Previous; Season 5 Next → Season 7

The sixth season of Blue Bloods, a police procedural drama series created by Robin Green and Mitchell Burgess, premiered on CBS September 25, 2015. Leonard Goldberg serves as executive producer. The season contained 22 episodes.

On May 11, 2015, CBS renewed Blue Bloods for a sixth season.

== Cast ==
Donnie Wahlberg (Danny Reagan), Bridget Moynahan (Erin Reagan), Will Estes (Jamie Reagan), and Len Cariou (Henry Reagan) are first credited. Amy Carlson (Linda Reagan) and Sami Gayle (Nicky Reagan-Boyle) are credited next, marking the second season they have been included in the opening credits. Tom Selleck (Frank Reagan) receives an "and" billing at the close of the main title sequence.

Marisa Ramirez, as Danny's partner Detective Maria Baez, and Vanessa Ray, as Jamie's partner Eddie Janko, continue to receive "also starring" billing for season 6. Appearing regularly and receiving "special guest star" billing are Gregory Jbara as Deputy Commissioner of Public Information Garrett Moore, Robert Clohessy as Lt. Sidney Gormley, and Abigail Hawk as Detective Baker, Frank's primary aide.

=== Main ===
- Tom Selleck as New York City Police Commissioner Francis "Frank" Reagan
- Donnie Wahlberg as Detective 1st Grade Daniel "Danny" Reagan
- Bridget Moynahan as ADA Erin Reagan
- Will Estes as Officer Jamison "Jamie" Reagan
- Len Cariou as New York City Police Commissioner Henry Reagan (Retired)
- Amy Carlson as Linda Reagan
- Sami Gayle as Nicole "Nicky" Reagan-Boyle
- Marisa Ramirez as Detective 1st Grade Maria Baez
- Vanessa Ray as Officer Edit "Eddie" Janko

=== Recurring ===
- Abigail Hawk as Detective 1st Grade Abigail Baker
- Gregory Jbara as Deputy Commissioner of Public Information Garrett Moore
- Robert Clohessy as Lieutenant Sidney "Sid" Gormley
- Steve Schirripa as DA Investigator Anthony Abetemarco
- Nicholas Turturro as Sergeant Anthony Renzulli
- Ato Essandoh as Reverend Darnell Potter
- Tony Terraciano as Jack Reagan
- Andrew Terraciano as Sean Reagan

=== Guest ===
- Whoopi Goldberg as Regina Thomas
- Malik Yoba as Detective Darryl Reid

== Episodes ==
No. overall	No. in season	Title	Directed by	Written by	Original release date	Prod. code	U.S. viewers (millions)
112	1	"Worst Case Scenario"	David M. Barrett	Bryan Goluboff	September 25, 2015	603	10.08
After a recent terrorist attack in the Middle East, Frank becomes convinced that New York City is the next target. His claims are confirmed when a waitress at a club tells Jamie and Eddie that she heard a regular speak terrorist-like language. Coincidentally, a foreign-speaking man runs into Danny and frantically informs him that his neighbors possessed bombs. With time running out, the Reagans must try to stop the bombers.
113	2	"Absolute Power"	David M. Barrett	Siobhan Byrne O'Connor	October 2, 2015	601	11.41
Mayoral candidate Katherine Tucker becomes convinced Frank is secretly investigating her husband. He learns Mayor Poole has been illegally using his security aides to do this, and besides uncovering an affair, found no actual criminal activity. He decides to tell her the truth, but Garrett warns that doing this could earn the mayor's wrath, and threaten his job and those of everyone around him. Danny uncovers several dead women in a secluded field, pointing to a serial killer. After calling the killer a coward on TV, he is taunted by him. He finds a common connection between all the victims and races to apprehend the murderer at his house, but sustains injuries that allow him to escape. In the end, the criminal taunts him again and teases going after more women. Meanwhile, Eddie's father Armin is brutally attacked in prison, and she and Jamie try to find out who did it. Armin's former cellmate tells them that the laundry room (where Armin was beat up) is the black market for prison drugs, and Eddie mistakenly believes that her father smuggled drugs into jail to sell, when in reality, he was beat up for refusing to. After Armin agrees to testify in court, Eddie makes amends with her father after many years, with Armin asking Jamie to "keep an eye" on his daughter for him.
114	3	"All the News That's Fit to Click"	Alex Chapple	Brian Burns	October 9, 2015	602	10.74
While riding along with Jamie and Eddie, journalist Lorenzo Colt is shot by an unknown assailant. Frank believes that this is evidence of a cop killer, so he has Gormley assign the case to Danny and Baez. But since Colt refuses to shed information (and instead exclusively reveal it on his news website), the two have to work from a different angle. Several pieces of evidence lead Danny to Michael Hicks, a man with a vendetta and history of violence against cops. He lures Hicks in through a fake ticket prize, but when lined up to see if he is recognized as the assailant, Colt doesn't talk, and the perp walks free. Later, the reporter is pushed from a building to his death, but his pair of spyglasses enable the detective to catch Hicks red-handed. Garrett is offered a high-paying job by a university head, and nearly considers it due to his feelings of guilt about what happened to Colt. Meanwhile, Linda is bothered about Danny's safety, mainly stemming from being shot (see episode 5x22 "The Art of War"). She even has a problem with the family talking about police work at Sunday dinner.
115	4	"With Friends Like These"	Heather Cappiello	Ian Beiderman	October 16, 2015	604	10.61
Erin attempts to convict a mob boss for a decades-old murder, but her former witness Vincent (see episode 5x15 "Power Players") comes out of witness protection to provide an alibi for his former employer. After expressing her disappointment, she is told that the true killer is a cop, and uses Vincent as bait to catch the culprit. Jamie and Eddie come across a young woman who is schizophrenic, and has been unable to get psychiatric help due to budget cuts. He manages to pull some strings to get her the help she deserves, but later is informed that she committed suicide. This leads to him suggesting the NYPD create a psychiatric advisal group. Frank is in hot water with the fire department after a group of firefighters and group of cops get into a brawl in Linda's emergency room. Frank tries to create a resolution, but the FDNY commissioner's stubbornness and dislike of him prevents this from happening. When firefighter interference gets an officer shot during a narcotics takedown, the P.C. decides to settle the dispute once and for all.
116	5	"Backstabbers"	John Behring	Dan Truly	October 23, 2015	605	10.42
Two women escape from prison, one of whom is Rose Butler — a mother who accidentally killed her husband in self defense and was sent to jail by Danny. With no information at all, Danny is forced to turn to her son, who may be the key to finding her before she is killed by the police. Gormley does not sign off on a police salesman's pitch, since he believes the guy in question is having an affair with his wife. Given an ultimatum by him, Frank learns that the lover is not the cop suspected, and must tell the truth before Gormley does something rash. Elsewhere, Nicky's college roommate, Chrissie, becomes the target of online harassment and offensive words. When campus security refuses to intervene, Nicky brings in Jamie, Eddie, and Erin, only to uncover that Chrissie committed the crimes herself to prove a point. Unable to live with herself, she overdoses on drugs, but the two friends later reconcile.
117	6	"Rush to Judgment"	Peter Werner	Peter Blauner	October 30, 2015	606	9.70
During an anti-NYPD protest led by Reverend Potter and civil rights attorney Jerry Guerrero, Jamie attempts to protect a mother and child by blocking an incoming biker, leading to the biker sustaining injuries. Conflicting accounts, as well as Potter's smear campaign, forces Frank to hand the case over to Internal affairs. At the same time, a woman and crowd supporter claims that Guerrero raped her; he denies this, and Danny and Baez learn that she faked the claim so as to get revenge for a previous problem the attorney was involved with. To fix things, Frank visits Potter and offers to help save Guerrero's reputation if the police are given access to witnesses. Erin tries to convict a rapper for writing a song too close to a murder, but his parents (who reveal that he is white and passes for black) say he was with them during the time of the homicide. Using this information, she tries to get him to reveal which friend of his committed the crime.
118	7	"The Bullitt Mustang"	David M. Barrett	Teleplay by : Kevin Wade; Story by : Kevin Wade & Willie Reale	November 6, 2015	607	10.90
The acting District Attorney decides to irrationally book several cops from Jamie's precinct for "forgetting" parking tickets and accepting money, with Eddie being among those swept up in the sting. Erin is forced to lead the effort in order to help her career (just as her 40th birthday nears), but this gets her into hot water with Frank's opinions on the matter. Meanwhile, the last and only car from the movie Bullitt is stolen from its owner. As Danny and Baez look for it, they are aided by a car dealer and learn the owner's family has a history of secrets. Eventually, the detectives learn the owner made the car disappear so he could get compensation money, but the car is not the one from Bullitt. Frank, Henry, Jamie, and Danny later visit a remote warehouse and locate the real Bullitt car in all its glory.
119	8	"Unsung Heroes"	Alex Chapple	Siobhan Byrne O'Connor	November 13, 2015	608	10.33
The dead body of a woman confirms that Thomas Wilder (Louis Cancelmi), the serial killer from "Absolute Power", is killing women once again. Danny and Baez go to his mother, who reveals that his twisted psyche stems from an abusive childhood, and gives them a cell address. However when the two head to a building from where the signal came, Wilder has already left so he can watch Danny from a distance - then threatens Danny's family. This in turn leads to Danny and Linda's marriage being further strained, forcing them to see a psychiatrist. TARU traces Wilder's signal to a boat in the harbor, but it blows up, with no evidence if Wilder died inside it or is still alive. Jamie responds to a 911 call where the head officer, Sgt. Mulvey, goes in without backup and takes down the crook while putting the hostage at risk. A scuffle between Jamie and Mulvey breaks out, and while Eddie thinks he overreacting about the sergeant's actions, Gormley does not; he finds out that the sergeant is dying from pancreatic cancer and has been going towards situations in a dangerous fashion so as to get himself killed, while putting lives in danger. Elsewhere, Nicky is concerned when protesters at her college plan to insult Frank during a speech because of their radical anti-police views. She desperately tries to get him to change his mind, but he insists on still going. The protesters hatefully disrupt Frank's attempted speech; but during Sunday dinner Nicky quotes Teddy Roosevelt's famous "It is not the critic that counts" speech - letting Frank know how proud she is of him.
120	9	"Hold Outs"	Eric Laneuville	Brian Burns	November 20, 2015	609	11.01
Erin's plans of going on vacation are derailed when a prosecutor hands her a case involving a carjacking murder that would have convicted a repeated felon had one juror not refused to say yes, thus resulting in a hung jury. Initially reluctant, she begins to believe the juror's side when the suspect reveals his no-killing rule, and a second witness turns up dead. ADA investigator Anthony Abetemarco (Steve Schirripa) helps her uncover that the wife was seeing a convict, and orchestrated her husband's murder. Elsewhere, Jamie and Eddie are among the cops in a sting operation for a gang repeatedly attacking a specific part of a neighborhood. Intimidating the leader, he has him catch the person behind the scare tactics—a building owner using the gang to scare off competition and buy up more buildings. After letting an expecting father step down from his duties, Frank is bugged by both reporters and Garrett about if he will stay on as Commissioner. Initially not wanting to respond because the reply isn't in person, he eventually says he would like to.
121	10	"Flags of Our Fathers"	David M. Barrett	Ian Biederman	December 11, 2015	610	9.95
Danny is informed by Erin that the D.A.'s office is looking at his ex-partner—Detective Reid (Malik Yoba)—on a case the latter might have fixed, and if he is revealed to be involved, serious implications will follow. Reid reveals that he did fake evidence, but kept quiet to protect Danny. This turn of events results in the convict, a murderer named Marcus Donovan, being released, and after a deal trap fails, Danny has 48 hours to find evidence linking Donovan to the murder. He eventually locates a contempt witness who comes around, but, correctly suspecting that Reid scared him into talking, Danny consciously decides to not turn the proof in. While answering questions at a school, Jamie encounters a wayward girl named Lily, who believes that all cops are murderers because her father was killed by one. Since Lily did not know her father was a drug dealer who died exchanging fire with cops, he chooses to tell her, but this revelation only causes her to run away. After he and Eddie locate her, they have her meet with the officer that killed her father, offering a place that can get her some help. Elsewhere, Frank is concerned with a group of anti-war activists who plan on burning an American flag at a veterans' memorial (yet have the right to do so). Their protest turns violent, and the leader David Gore untruthfully says the NYPD let them be attacked. With another protest looming, Frank organizes an operation to protect them headed by Gormley, but he personally refuses, as he is a veteran himself.
122	11	"Back in the Day"	Robert Harmon	Bryan Goluboff	January 8, 2016	612	10.85
Frank's first partner Lenny Ross (Treat Williams) has decided to publish an exposé book about their early days on the job. Garrett warns that the publicity of the book could both give Frank's enemies a weapon to use against him and harm his reputation, so he advises the P.C. to try to forcefully prevent the book from being published. This creates a rift between him and Ross, but after a talk with his family, Frank decides to be proud of the book's contents. Jack is being bullied at school, so Danny has him score revenge by dosing the bully's food with ipecac. Elsewhere, Jamie learns that Eddie got the two of them assigned to a stakeout for a home invader who might be visiting his mother. During the second night, a 10-13 comes in, but Eddie refuses to leave and he has to go on his own. Even though the call turns out to be no big deal and Eddie's stubbornness collars the crook, Jamie makes it clear that if she ever goes against an emergency call again, he will ask to get a new partner. Meanwhile, one of Erin's investigators is killed in a bar shooting. His best friend David tells them that he had been working a corruption case involving relief funds for Hurricane Sandy reconstruction contracts, but the case never made it to court because two witnesses were killed in mob-suspected hits. Later, surveillance reveals that David's father—an influential senator—orchestrated the hits because he was involved in the relief contracts, and his son ashamedly admits to slipping him the list of witnesses.
123	12	"Cursed"	Peter Leto	Daniel Truly	January 15, 2016	611	10.62
Danny and Baez come to the scene of an influential criminal's killing, to which they find an errand person named Ronny in the trunk. Learning that he can report information inside the Vanchetti crime family, they send him back in the hopes of acquiring more information. It isn't until a bike courier provides video proof of Ronny killing the brother, though, that the detectives set a trap for him. Frank learns that an officer at the 12th Precinct, Jill Carpenter, wants her late father's shield number (a recently killed Boston police captain), but is shocked when he learns the number is 46808—the one his late and oldest son Joe used. Making him even more worried is the knowledge that any cop who used the number has died - more often than not, violently. A family vote deems Carpenter worthy of the badge number, but a violent encounter nearly claims her life. Jamie and Eddie collar a man who fits the description of a stabber in the neighborhood, but Renzulli uses his influence to spring him free. He questions the sergeant and learns that the man, Derek, was a close friend he has been watching out for due to a descent into drugs. When the two visit him, Jamie's presence causes Derek to panic and escape with a gun. They go after him but are too late when Derek dies while trying to stop the actual mugger. Renzulli apologizes to Jamie and Eddie for keeping quiet.
124	13	"Stomping Grounds"	Don Thorin, Jr.	Peter Blauner	January 22, 2016	613	11.56
At the retirement party of NYPD lieutenant Tim Harrison (Michael O'Keefe), Frank learns that he plans on leaving New York because he dislikes Frank's openness to changing times. Later that night, an attempted robbery on the subway winds up killing both the perp and a bystander trying to help, and a discarded wallet and several witnesses confirm the shooter to be Harrison. A manhunt is put out, but it's only when Harrison comes to Erin's office is he apprehended. The whole ordeal especially shocks Henry, who is forced to realize that the cop's racial bigotries have clouded his judgement and derailed his career. Baez catches a glimpse of Octavio Nunez, a drug trafficker whom she saw stomp a neighborhood child to death at age ten. She is initially reluctant about going after the criminal, but with Danny's support relents. When Nunez's latest tenant in an apartment complex suspiciously burns to death, the detectives try to find witnesses who saw either of the murders, but none (including Baez's own family) are brave enough to do it. On Erin's advice, Danny arrests Nunez because he's been evicting clients without notice, and Baez is able to properly confront him. Jamie becomes worried about Eddie when their training sergeant makes a move on her and begins making passes at her despite being turned down. After the two have some drinks, he expresses his concern, but Janko doesn't want his help because it might look bad for her reputation. Jamie later confronts the training sergeant at a bar (where it's revealed that he has a history of harassing female cops) and advocates that he transfer to Staten Island.
125	14	"The Road to Hell"	Thomas R. Moore	Siobhan Byrne O'Connor	February 12, 2016	614	10.92
While driving home from a party, Nicky and a group of friends are pulled over and arrested when the police find drugs in her car. Erin decides to let prosecution handle it since Nicky knows who is responsible, but doesn't want to be a snitch, and her college suspends her. The matter is settled when she convinces the guilty party to turn themselves in -- a tactic she learned about through advice from Sid Gormley. Danny investigates the death of deceiving pimp Pablo, which all his prostitutes claim to have killed him. Questioning an angry man named Haviere, they learn that his sister Martinez was one of Pablo's prostitutes and may have done it herself. Danny finds her just as she is about to commit suicide, but manages to talk her down; he also arrests the other prostitutes so Martinez's self-defense statement will be backed by Erin. Frank learns that Mason Reyes, a troubled young man, has been stealing money from the local branch of the Catholic Church and recommends that he be punished. Instead, local pastor Father Quinn believes in forgiveness and lets him off the hook. The P.C. learns Quinn has a history of allowing Mason to slide off crimes, and becomes increasingly worried. The scenario culminates when Reyes arrives at the church with a gun and threatens lives, and a forced struggle between the priest and man for the gun results in both of them getting shot. Both survive, but the delinquent now will be going to jail for his misguided crimes.
126	15	"Fresh Start"	David M. Barrett	Brian Burns	February 19, 2016	615	10.74
Erin is pulled from a date to learn that a police officer was shot by none other than Adrian Cook, a felon who was given a second chance by her as part of the Mayor's "Fresh Start" program. She feels incredibly guilty and faces scrutiny by both the media and the cop's widow, who physically attacks her in her office. However, ballistics indicate the gun Cook discarded wasn't the one used to kill the officer. After finding video proof of him committing another robbery nearby, Erin and Anthony are able to apprehend the real shooter by looking at a carjacking report. Frank and Mayor Poole are at odds because the latter will not formally ask Frank if he wants to stay on as commissioner. Their initial meeting turns into an out-of-line argument about the Fresh Start program, but they later settle on an agreement of the P.C.'s future. Elsewhere, Danny is assigned a missing cop, Ken Nelson, suspected of going AWOL. Jamie reveals that he has been rumored to be on drugs after his son died and his wife divorced him. The detectives locate him in a drug house, only to be conflicted over what to do with him: Danny wants to take him in for drug abuse, while Baez (remembering her brother's history with drugs) wants to get him treatment. She also feels that Danny bends the rules enough times for himself, and should do it once for her. Eventually he agrees, and the two take Nelson to rehabilitation.
127	16	"Help Me Help You"	Alex Chapple	Ian Biederman	February 26, 2016	616	10.33
Linda introduces Danny and Baez to Lorie, a coworker at St. Vicks Hospital whose ex-husband Ronnie has been visiting her irregularly, and is mad about her engagement to fiancée Paul and Paul's relationship with their son. She's worried that things will dangerously escalate, her fears being confirmed when he attempts to harass them outside their home. The two exes have a chat that apparently fixes things, but Danny thinks the whole affair is a fuss over nothing (especially when Lorie panics over her son going to a friend's house without telling anyone). However, when Paul actually goes missing, Danny is forced to stop Ronnie before he does something horrible. Additionally, Danny and Linda's conflict reaches a boiling point when they get in a shouting match at home, but they reconcile soon after. Frank finds himself being opposed by city councilwoman Regina Thomas (Whoopi Goldberg), who fervently dislikes the NYPD's "broken windows" policy and is making a bill to destroy it. With the policy essential to other acts of good police work, he finds he has no choice but to act. At the meeting over the bill, Thomas outlines how many problems the policy causes, but Frank admits that even if one side wins, they both lose, and instead opts for a compromise. Meanwhile, Erin is concerned over judge Zack Wilson, a former mentor who has been making incredibly biased and harsh rulings after the death of his wife Ellen. After he throws out evidence in a case proving a repeat crook didn't commit a crime, she promptly files a complaint to the judicial review board, but is suspended by her boss for going against his order not to intervene. Wilson eventually realizes he was out of line, and mends things with Erin while planning to take an indefinite leave of absence.
128	17	"Friends in Need"	P.J. Pesce	Kevin Riley & Kevin Wade	March 11, 2016	617	9.83
Erin learns that Anthony's cousin Joey has been coercing cops into investments that inevitably turn out bad. Because she wants to investigate him, Anthony asks to be part of the investigation, but she is worried that getting him involved will cloud his personal judgment. The two get a break when they meet Erica Raymes, the widow of Joey's late business partner. Initially she defends Joey, but later reveals the truth. She reveals Joey's scamming of their business made them lose a large amount of money and her husband later took his own life in a car crash, and now Joey has forced her to keep quiet in exchange for monetary assistance. With him in the wind following this revelation, Anthony uses Joey's own mother to lure him in for a well-deserved arrest. Jamie is partnered with Marcus Beal (Michael Drayer), a rookie whose father was friends with Danny, and became a cop following his father's death just like his surrogate mentor. However, he finds it incredibly hard to mentor Marcus because of his overconfidence, cocky nature, and refusal to listen to protocol. When the two catch a robber fleeing, he ignores orders to stay put and catches the crook, but accidentally injures a little girl in the process. When he and the other cops intercept a bank robbery, Jamie and Eddie take down the gunmen, but Marcus' intervention puts everybody at risk and gets a cop shot. Realizing what a menace he was, Marcus decides to resign from the NYPD, and Jamie supports his decision. Frank is met by British intelligence officials who wish for advice on better security policies, but one in particular -- Sloane Thompson (Alex Kingston) -- pushes more and more for knowledge on secret NYPD tactics. This frustrates the conversation, and after an apology from Sloane, the two have a proper dinner.
129	18	"Town Without Pity"	David M. Barrett	Peter Blauner	April 1, 2016	618	10.40
Nick Constantine (Michael Nouri), an ex-con whom Frank arrested years ago, served 20 years in jail and since has turned his life around. He aids Frank in helping to curb a young ex-criminal's dark future, but several hours later, a mobster is shot at the diner he owns, and the evidence points towards Constantine as the killer. Arrested by Danny, he says that he did not kill the man, but Frank gets the feeling that he is hiding something. When his son Stavros comes in and admits to the crime, they use this as leverage to get Nick to confess to the whole thing himself. Erin attempts to prosecute Jeremy Durning, a doctor who went on the run after being accused of killing his wife Beth. Her efforts are hindered by attorney Kathy Elliot, who hides his location in order to exclusively reveal his story on her podcast. Learning that Durning intimidated a witness, Erin and Anthony follow the egotistic lawyer to a remote location and manage to nab the doctor. Elliot coughs up a piece of evidence making it seem like Beth is alive, but this is later disproved and she is forced to cooperate for the sake of her career. Jamie and Eddie come across a dead man, Harry Clark, in a foul-smelling apartment with loads of cash and newspaper clippings of a bank robbery years ago scattered around. The two begin to believe that Harry was one of the robbers in the heist, their hypothesis being confirmed when they meet Sandi Harper (the wife of a late bank guard who was in on the heist). Harry had been sending her money from the robbery in order to pay her back and also keep her grandson in school, but without the funding she faces the risk of being unable to do this anymore. Jamie is conflicted over whether to give the money back to the public or to the needy Sandi, but after a talk with Henry - who recalls that, while policing the South Bronx during the 1977 blackout, he chose not to arrest a woman taking groceries and children's necessities from a store which had grossly overcharged its desperate customers - decides to let her and her grandson take it for themselves.
130	19	"Blast from the Past"	Eric Laneuville	Bryan Goluboff	April 8, 2016	619	10.35
To catch a robbery crew that shot a famed Brooklyn boxer, Danny and Baez are forced to work with Jimmy Mosley, a detective whom Maria was in a relationship with (but ended because he was seeing his wife simultaneously). With him now being divorced, the two start seeing each other over the course of the investigation, but Danny isn't so convinced things are peachy keen. The detectives realize that the robbers use a woman to distract their victims, and track her to their hideout. In the midst of taking down the robbers, however, Mosley is shot. Later, the two visit him in the hospital only to uncover he is in a relationship with another cop, and Danny comforts the once again heartbroken Baez. Meanwhile, Frank is conflicted about promoting Thomas Sculley, an officer who accidentally shot a Muslim teen 14 years earlier out of fear after 9/11, to sergeant. He feels guilty enough, and has tried repenting by teaching others not to do what he did. But the P.C. frets that promoting him to sergeant will lead to public backlash, and ultimately is forced to outsource him to another city. Elsewhere, Jamie attempts to help two Mexican girls recover a family heirloom, a prized ring, that was stolen during their trip. Attempting to track the ring through a low-level criminal and a jewelry dealer, they learn the ring was actually sold by one of the girls to score a quick buck, much to her friend's anger. He helps bring the guilty party to justice, and the young lady asks him to be her escort to said wedding.
131	20	"Down the Rabbit Hole"	David M. Barrett	Siobhan Byrne O'Connor	April 15, 2016	620	10.41
Thomas Wilder's latest score of dead women brings Danny to Nassau County, where he teams up with FBI behavioral specialist Adam Parker. Parker thinks he is only encouraging the killer and should instead capitalize on Wilder's obsession with him. When Danny publicly mocks him for killing his mother, Wilder retaliates by kidnapping Nicky in revenge. TARU traces Nicky's cell phone to a remote area, where he and Erin manage to find her. Danny follows Wilder to an open field, where the murderer taunts him by keeping his hands out of sight and saying that no matter if he shoots him in self-defense or murder, he will always be in Danny's head. When he suddenly pulls his hands out from behind his back making finger guns, Danny quickly shoots him. Frank finds it irritating having to mediate with the FBI agent in charge of the Wilder investigation, who cares only about getting and not going through protocol. Several Irish delegates come to town to award Frank, but one of the delegates, Police Chief Fairley, seeks Erin's help in uncovering the truth about his father's suspicious death. She instead learns the Fairley's father is in fact alive, was a former gangster, and is incarcerated with a life sentence at Sing Sing. Breaking the news, she arranges a meeting between Fairley and his dad. Meanwhile, after stopping a slasher, Jamie meets a rookie cop who happens to be Nicky's new boyfriend, and proceeds to spill the beans to the rest of the family.
132	21	"The Extra Mile"	John Behring	Brian Burns	April 29, 2016	621	10.13
In an attempt to convict a murderer from the Warrior Kings, Erin tries to get Willis, a scared witness, to testify. Worried over his safety, he instead opts to flee from testifying, forcing Erin to send out a material witness order for his appearance. Once he is caught she proceeds with the case, but as Willis' fear intensifies and he is placed in a cell next to the very murderer he was testifying against, Anthony finds he has no choice but to resign over how Willis is being treated. However, Erin reveals the whole affair was a way for her to get video proof of the suspect threatening Willis, and with the murderer sentenced and Willis having not testified, he is able to return to his old life. She also promises to never keep Anthony in the dark again if he stays, and he agrees. Frank is pressured by Sid and Garrett to go the policeman's dinner party, but he refuses. They continue to pester him, and even try using Gormley's own wife as an excuse. Ultimately, he manages to get them to back off by threatening to cancel the event, and only changes his mind when Sid appeals to the consequences of the decision. Danny happens upon a wine store robbery, with the clerk dead and a bystander named Peter Kaplan shot in the leg. Recovering in the hospital, Kaplan points towards a generic black convict, who Danny and Baez narrow down to nearby ex-con Morgan Rutherford. Since Rutherford points out the prejudice in their assumption and has an alibi, Danny looks back at Kaplan. After he is unable to seize his bag and a drug dog fails to locate the suspected gun, Baez discovers the truth in his finances. It turns out that Kaplan's wife is an addictive gambler who lost a lot of money in Atlantic City, and to compensate the couple chose to rob the wine store for cash (with him being shot in the leg due to his anatomy expertise). With the use of this, they arrest his wife and then Kaplan as he is having lunch.
133	22	"Blowback"	David M. Barrett	Ian Biederman	May 6, 2016	622	10.10
Officer Eric Russell becomes the spotlight of mass controversy when, while he, Jamie and Eddie are attempting to apprehend a group of thieves, he shoots a teen offender named Diego Perez, who refused to surrender and advanced on him, hands up, with a knife. Although Russell's self-defense statement is backed by eyewitness testimony and his body camera, mass public sentiment against the NYPD spawns from his grand jury acquittal. Making matters worse, Mayor Poole criticizes the police with plans for a personal investigation, and the body camera footage is somehow leaked to the public. Immediately afterward, Russell's partner Officer Mark Hayes is shot in what looks like payback. Danny and Baez, going through little evidence because no witnesses want to talk to them, come to believe the perpetrator is Miguel Santana, a criminal with a lengthy history; however, the detectives have little solid evidence that proves he shot Hayes. Luckily, when they learn that a nearby pedestrian named Gabby Castillo saw Santana shoot Hayes, they coerce her to tell the truth. Erin is appalled when Frank asks her to determine if the leak came from the mayor's office, and refuses. She does, however, identify the whistle blower as her assistant in the D.A.'s office (who felt that Russell's acquittal was wrong, despite the proof to the contrary), and has her promptly removed from her position. Frank later visits Poole to apologize for thinking he was behind the leak, only to learn that the Mayor plans on resigning because of personal guilt over what happened to Hayes. Frank instead manages to turn him away from this just before the mayor goes to television to publicly apologize to the city.

== Ratings ==
Viewership and ratings per episode of Blue Bloods season 6
No.	Title	Air date	Rating/share (18–49)	Viewers (millions)	DVR (18–49)	DVR viewers (millions)	Total (18–49)	Total viewers (millions)
1	"Worst Case Scenario"	September 25, 2015	1.3/5	10.08	—N/a	4.26	—N/a	14.34
2	"Absolute Power"	October 2, 2015	1.3/5	11.41	0.9	3.88	2.2	15.30
3	"All The News That's Fit to Click"	October 9, 2015	1.3/5	10.74	—N/a	3.57	—N/a	14.31
4	"With Friends Like These"	October 16, 2015	1.1/4	10.61	—N/a	3.93	—N/a	14.30
5	"Backstabbers"	October 23, 2015	1.2/4	10.42	—N/a	3.91	—N/a	14.33
6	"Rush to Judgment"	October 30, 2015	1.1/4	9.70	0.7	3.94	1.8	13.63
7	"The Bullitt Mustang"	November 6, 2015	1.3/5	10.90	—N/a	4.10	—N/a	15.00
8	"Unsung Heroes"	November 13, 2015	1.2/4	10.33	—N/a	4.08	—N/a	14.41
9	"Hold Outs"	November 20, 2015	1.1/4	11.01	—N/a	3.87	—N/a	14.88
10	"Flags Of Our Fathers"	December 11, 2015	1.1/4	9.95	0.7	4.21	1.8	14.16
11	"Back in the Day"	January 8, 2016	1.4/5	10.85	0.8	4.24	2.2	15.05
12	"Cursed"	January 15, 2016	1.3/5	10.62	0.8	4.19	2.1	14.81
13	"Stomping Grounds"	January 22, 2016	1.5/5	11.56	0.8	4.14	2.3	15.69
14	"The Road to Hell"	February 12, 2016	1.4/5	10.92	0.8	4.03	2.2	14.96
15	"Fresh Start"	February 19, 2016	1.3/5	10.74	0.7	3.93	2.0	14.67
16	"Help Me Help You"	February 26, 2016	1.2/4	10.33	—N/a	4.13	—N/a	14.45
17	"Friends In Need"	March 11, 2016	1.2/4	9.83	0.8	3.97	2.0	13.89
19	"Blast From The Past"	April 8, 2016	1.2/5	10.35	0.8	4.20	2.0	14.55
20	"Down the Rabbit Hole"	April 15, 2016	1.3/5	10.41	0.7	4.03	2.0	14.44
21	"The Extra Mile"	April 29, 2016	1.2/4	10.13	0.7	3.97	1.9	14.09
22	"Blowback"	May 6, 2016	1.1/4	10.10	0.8	3.89	1.9	14.00
