= List of Blue Bloods characters =

This is an overview of the regular, recurring, and other characters of the CBS TV crime drama franchise Blue Bloods with the original series (2010–24) and its spin-off Boston Blue (starting in 2025).

== Reagan family ==
=== Family tree ===
Charles	Unnamed Mother
Henry	Betty
Peter	Frank	Mary
Linda	Danny	Jack	Erin	Joe	Paula	Jamie	Eddie
Jack	Sean	Nicky	Joe H.

Grey indicates that the character is deceased or died during the series

=== Frank Reagan ===
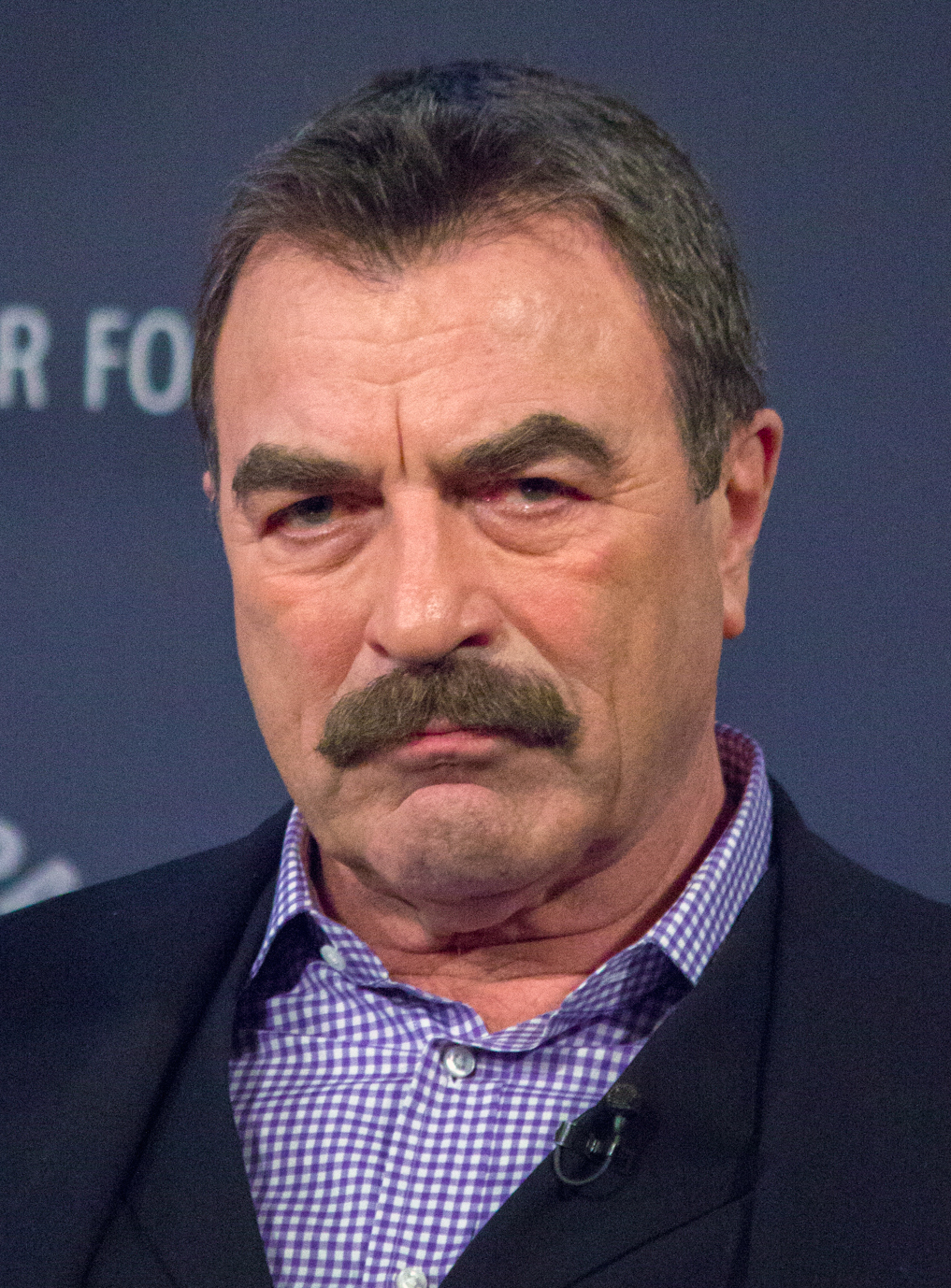
Frank Reagan is played by actor Tom Selleck.

Commissioner Francis Xavier Reagan, portrayed by former Magnum, P.I. star Tom Selleck, is the patriarch of the Reagan family.

Frank is the younger son of Henry (Len Cariou) and Betty Reagan, born in Bay Ridge, Brooklyn, New York in the early 1950s. His older brother Peter Christopher Reagan died of leukemia at the age of 18 months, over a year before Frank was born. Frank married Mary Margaret Reagan (née Conor) in the early 1970s, and they had four children together: Joe, Danny, Erin and Jamie. Frank is also a loving grandfather to Erin's daughter Nicky Reagan-Boyle (Sami Gayle) and Danny's two children, Jack (Tony Terraciano) and Sean Reagan (Andrew Terraciano). In Season 10's "Family Secrets" Frank learns that he also has one more grandson, Joseph Hill, the son of Paula Hill, whom Joe Reagan had met at the academy. Paula said the two had had a brief affair and that she never told Joe about her pregnancy or his son. Paula visits Frank and reveals the news in an effort to get her son, a young detective in the firearms unit, assigned to a less dangerous precinct.

After serving in the United States Marine Corps during the Vietnam War during which time he held the rank of Lieutenant and was awarded the Navy & Marine Corps Achievement Medal, Frank became the third generation of Reagans to become a police officer. He began his career as a patrolman and was later promoted to Detective 3rd Grade. He thereafter served in various positions across the city, including Chief of the Brooklyn South Division and the Chief of Department of the NYPD, culminating in his appointment as Police Commissioner.

On September 11, 2001, Frank was working in the North Tower when the South Tower collapsed. He spent days at Ground Zero and took refuge at St. Paul's Chapel, where he and other officers slept in the pews. Frank was appointed the Police Commissioner by Mayor Frank Russo (Bruce Altman). In 2011, after the election of Carter Poole (David Ramsey), Frank offers to tender his resignation, but Poole decides to keep Frank on as PC. In the first season, Frank is well regarded and respected by his officers and his city, to the point where the mayor felt threatened by his popularity; however, by season 6, public opinion regarding the police – and him personally – has changed so drastically that he gets booed off-stage while speaking at Columbia University. However, in season 7, new mayor Margaret Dutton affirms that his polls are better than any of the New York City mayors.

=== Danny Reagan ===
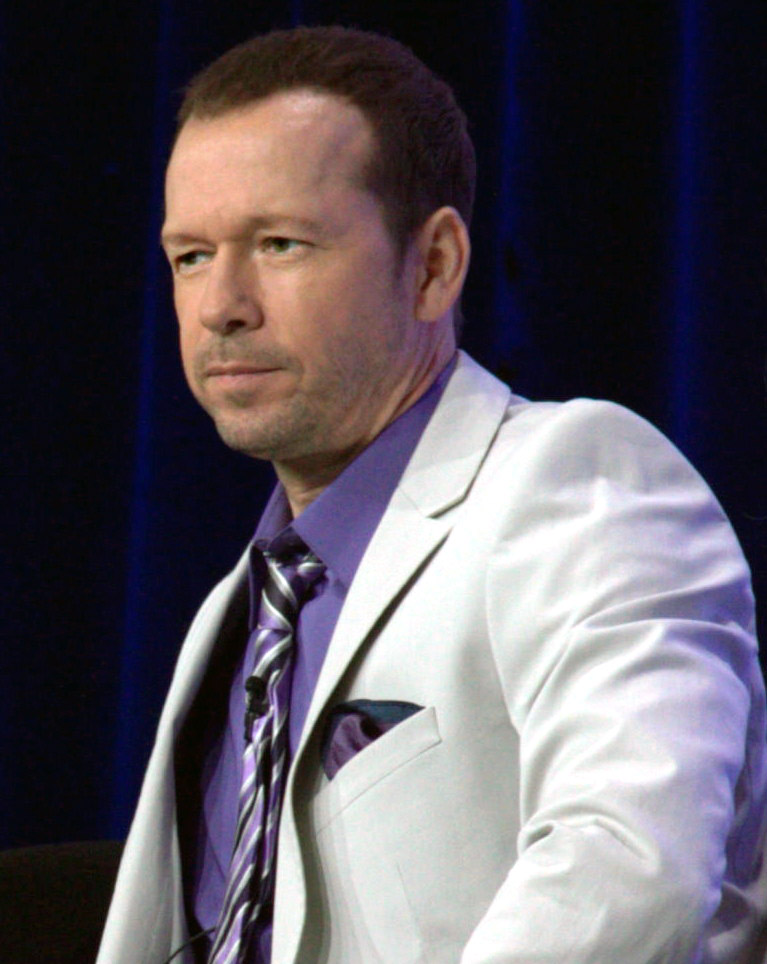
Donnie Wahlberg plays Danny Reagan

Detective First Grade Daniel Fitzgerald Reagan is the eldest surviving son of Commissioner Frank Reagan. He is portrayed by New Kids on the Block singer Donnie Wahlberg.

On the job for 15 years (as of season 1), Danny took a leave of absence from the New York City Police Department to serve two tours in the Iraq War as a Marine. He had enlisted and served in the Marines shortly after high school and prior to joining the NYPD and either stayed in the Marine Corps Reserve and was activated or volunteered to reenlist at the start of the war. Danny saw combat in Fallujah and was the only member of his platoon to come home alive (resulting in some post-traumatic stress). During his time in the Marines, Danny was decorated for heroism.

Danny has a traditional police outlook; his hotheadedness and harsh methods of detective work sometimes get him in trouble, which his father worries about. When asked if his son "crosses the line" and violates procedure from time to time, Frank answered, "I think he walks on the line". Danny is hard on other policemen and detectives when he feels they are unprofessional or not doing their duty to its utmost. He is currently assigned to the Detective Squad of the 54th Precinct and partnered with Detective Maria Baez. In "Most Wanted", the audience learns that he leads the Manhattan South Detective Borough in both collars and complaints. In "Love Stories", Baez and Danny are awarded the NYPD Medal for Valor for their actions in "Partners".

As a detective with the NYPD, Danny carries a Kahr K9 in 9×19mm as his duty weapon and drives a Dodge Charger on duty, which replaced his previous Chevrolet Impala 9C1. He also owns a Glock 19 in 9×19mm and previously used a Smith & Wesson 5906 in 9×19mm. Danny drove a Jeep XJ Cherokee as his personal and family vehicle from Season 1 to Season 5, while Linda drove a rather troublesome 2001 Kia Sedona/Carnival; this vehicle was replaced when Henry lost his driver's license and gave Linda his car. In Season 6, Danny's Cherokee was replaced by a fourth-generation Ford Explorer.

=== Erin Reagan ===
Assistant District Attorney Erin Reagan is Frank Reagan's only daughter. She is portrayed by Bridget Moynahan. A New York County Assistant District Attorney and single mother, Erin is the second child and only daughter of Frank Reagan and his late wife Mary. She grew up in Bay Ridge, Brooklyn, with three brothers, Danny, Joe, and Jamie. She may have been somewhat wild when growing up. In season 5, the audience learns that she graduated top of her class from Columbia University. Erin later attended Fordham University School of Law. In season 6, Erin celebrated her 40th birthday.

Erin is divorced from John "Jack" Boyle (Peter Hermann), a criminal defense attorney whom she met when they were 19. Daughter Nicky is the couple's only child. In "Old Wounds", Erin finally changes her surname from Erin Reagan-Boyle back to Erin Reagan. Since her divorce, Erin has had a few romantic interests. She and her boss, District Attorney Charles Rosselini (Bobby Cannavale), flirted with each other and even shared a kiss after a date, but nothing ever came of it mainly due to Erin's reluctance about dating her boss. In 2011, she met Jacob Krystal (Fred Weller) at an art gallery; she later learned that he was an art thief who returned once-stolen works to their rightful owners, and he left town. In 2013, after being shot in a courtroom hostage situation, Erin began dating her ex-husband Jack, but eventually broke up with him when she realized Jack only wanted to date and that he did not want a serious commitment. In 2014, Erin met defense attorney Robert McCoy on a speed-date, and the two became romantically involved until he was appointed interim District Attorney, at which point she said that she could not be romantically involved with her boss.

Erin is almost raped and killed in "Re-Do", though Frank saves her life by shooting her attacker dead. In "To Protect and Serve", Erin is taken hostage and shot in the arm at the courthouse. She is saved by Danny when he shoots her assailant.

In "Working Girls", Erin is offered the position of Deputy Mayor of Operations by Mayor Poole, but she turns him down. In "Ends and Means", Erin is promoted from Senior Counsel to Deputy Bureau Chief of the Trial Bureau. In the season four finale, she filed a complaint against her boss, Bureau Chief Amanda Harris, upon learning she had abused her power. In season six, Erin was considered for a judgeship. Erin is on the short list to become District Attorney in the season 11 episode "In the Name of the Father", after her boss, DA Samar Chatwell, is arrested on corruption charges. While Erin is on the short list to be named Acting DA by the governor, the governor ultimately chooses the then-Acting DA for Fulton County, Georgia (Atlanta) for the job.

Like the rest of her family, Erin is licensed to carry a firearm. Her weapon of choice is the Glock 19 in 9×19mm, and according to Frank, she is a better shot than Danny and Jamie. In season 8, the audience learns that Erin had wanted to join the police force like her the rest of her family but chose law and became a prosecutor instead.

=== Jamie Reagan ===
Sergeant Jameson Reagan is the youngest son of Frank Reagan. He is portrayed by Will Estes. First introduced as newly graduated cadet and former Harvard Law School graduate, Jamie is the youngest child of Frank Reagan and his Mary. Jamie grew up in Bay Ridge, Brooklyn with two older brothers, Danny and Joe, and an older sister, Erin. His shield number as a patrol officer was 60528 and as a sergeant is 71181.

=== Henry Reagan ===
Henry "Pop" Reagan is a former New York City Police Commissioner and the father of current Commissioner Frank Reagan. He is portrayed by Len Cariou. He is described in one source as "grizzled family patriarch Henry Reagan, a retired NYPD police commissioner who saw military action in World War II and Korea".

The retired New York City Police Commissioner and father of Frank, being the only one who calls him by his full name Francis. In the season 13 episode, "Homefront", broadcast in 2022, Frank states that Henry is 88 years old, which would place his year of birth around 1934. Henry's childhood was hard due to his father, Charles, an Irish immigrant, World War I veteran and former police officer, being an alcoholic and unable to hold a job. Henry was a Marine in World War II (though this is inconsistent with his later-stated age) and Korea and joined the NYPD in 1952. He got married in 1955. Like his grandson Danny, Henry is socially conservative and hates the political correctness of modern law and order. His wife of 46 years Betty died December 2, 2001. It is later revealed that Henry and Betty had another son, Peter Christopher, who died of leukemia at the age of 18 months, over a year before Frank was born.

Henry once rode with one of the first female patrol officers, Colleen McGuire (Anita Gillette). Henry admitted that they both had romantic feelings for each other, but they never acted on them since he was married. He had his boss reassign Colleen to a different partner to avoid putting his marriage at further risk but remained good friends with her. In "Stomping Grounds", Henry mentions that during his days as a Detective with the Vice Squad he transferred out of the unit when he started to see every woman on the street as a prostitute. In "Town Without Pity", Henry mentions that during the New York City blackout of 1977 he was stationed in the South Bronx. Actor Len Cariou, who portrays Henry, is separated in age from Tom Selleck by only six years and wears make-up and a dental prosthetic to appear older.

=== Linda Reagan ===
Nurse Linda Rose Reagan (née O'Shea) was Danny Reagan's wife. She was portrayed by Daytime Emmy–nominated actress Amy Carlson.

The wife of Danny from 1996 to 2017 and mother of their two sons, she loves her husband and the Reagan family, but at times, Danny's obsessive attitude toward collaring criminals makes her wonder whether he views his job as a higher priority than his family. In seasons one and two, Linda is a stay-at-home mother, but she returns to her nursing job at St. Victor's Medical Center in season three.

Linda has an older sister Wendy (Laurie Williams) and a niece, Sofie, who is a fashion model. She also has a brother Jimmy O'Shea (Kevin Dillon), who has been in and out of trouble with the law.

In "New Rules", Linda is shot at the hospital by a teenage gangster who had been ordered to kill a witness, but she eventually makes a full recovery. In "Under the Gun," Linda is mugged while working a community health van in the projects and uses her father-in-law's influence to bypass the New York City pistol permitting process to obtain an unrestricted concealed carry permit and buys a .38 Special Smith & Wesson Model 36 revolver. Ultimately Linda decides that she does not want to be armed after all and gives the pistol to Danny.

On May 28, 2017 (between seasons 7 and 8), Linda died in a medivac helicopter crash while tending to a patient being air lifted to the hospital. It was later implied in the season 9 premiere episode that the Mexican cartel hitman known as the Panther had been responsible for the aforementioned helicopter crash.

=== Nicky Reagan-Boyle ===
Nicole Reagan is Erin Reagan's daughter, and Frank Reagan's only granddaughter. She is portrayed by Marlene Lawston in the pilot episode and by Sami Gayle for the rest of the series.

Erin's daughter, born October 14, 1996, aspires to become an officer like the rest of her family. As of "Old Wounds", she is 15 years old. In season five, she is a high school senior preparing for college; in season six, she is attending Columbia University, her mother's alma mater, and graduates at the end of season 9. She is very curious and likes to ask her Uncle Danny and great-grandfather about police matters, often challenging their old-school conservatism. During the early seasons she had short hair, but in later seasons she grew it out. She wanted to join the family business as the first female Reagan to be a cop. In season 8, Nicky takes the police exam, over her mother's objections. In season 10, Nicky is offered a job in San Francisco, and later accepts. She appears in only one episode of season 11. She makes a guest appearance in the series finale episode "End of Tour".

=== Eddie Janko-Reagan ===
Jamie's partner and eventual wife, Officer Edit Marie "Eddie" Janko Reagan (first name pronounced "eh-DEET") is of mixed Hungarian and Serbian descent. Feisty and strongly opinionated, she is very passionate when it comes to her job. She is portrayed by Vanessa Ray.

Eddie's mother, Lena Janko (Christine Ebersole), immigrated from Serbia and Eddie herself is fluent in the Serbian language, which comes in handy when Danny recruits her to bust a sex trafficking ring. Her Hungarian-born father, Armin Janko (Michael Cullen), was a financial advisor before his company was revealed to be involved in a Ponzi scheme, ruining a lot of good people. As a result, he is serving a prison sentence. He gets a lighter sentence after busting a prison guard drug ring. Later, when he is released from prison, he briefly lives with Eddie and Jamie until Eddie's mother allows him to live with her.

In "The Bullitt Mustang", Eddie is one of several police officers charged with official misconduct by the acting New York County District Attorney for fixing her 90-year-old neighbor's parking tickets; the charges are subsequently dropped after Frank and Erin work out a deal.

In "Back in the Day", Eddie reveals her aspirations of making detective, having signed up Jamie and herself for a surveillance assignment for one of the precinct's detectives. While awaiting their target, Eddie chose to remain at her post when Jamie chose to respond to an officer-down call, which proved to be false. This led to a brief conflict between them, with Jamie threatening to get a new partner if she ever goes against an emergency call again.

There has been significant romantic tension between Eddie and Jamie since the middle of season four, the two even sharing a kiss. Despite their attraction, Jamie had chosen not to act on his feelings after learning that Renzulli would reassign them to new partners per NYPD protocol. Nevertheless, there continued to be romantic tension lingering between the two, which had become much more apparent in "Personal Business" when they both acknowledged to each other how they feel, leading to another kiss. Despite this, they agreed not to further act on their feelings since they don't wish to jeopardize their partnership.

However, after a life-threatening situation in the season 8 finale, Jamie and Eddie fully accepted their feelings and got engaged. When they announced their engagement to the Reagan family, Frank offered Eddie her choice of a new precinct assignment. However, Jamie pointed out that there is no actual regulation prohibiting married NYPD officers from being partnered on the job. Therefore, they have decided to remain partners as well. In Season 9 Episode 1 "Playing With Fire", however, after Frank contemplates issuing an official written rule because of his concerns for such an arrangement, Eddie tells Jamie that all she wants is for them to be a couple. Jamie later announces to Frank that he had scored at the top of the Sergeants' Exam (Frank had not yet looked at the scores and was under the impression that he had declined to take it) and has decided to accept the promotion. This, therefore, ends his patrol partnership with Eddie and resolves their conflict. Frank then gives his blessing for the marriage, saying he couldn't be happier for Jamie and Eddie.

Jamie's promotion to Sergeant and transfer to the 29th Precinct results in the precinct commander transferring out several patrol officers whom Jamie catches in what appears to be either an internal brawl or a Fight Club-like activity in the precinct locker room. Jamie recommends the transfer of six officers from the 12th, including Eddie, to the 29th to replace them. Eddie initially declines her transfer, telling Jamie she needs the space for her own career to grow. Despite this, she quickly changes her mind after visiting Jamie at the 29th while in civilian clothes and overhearing several patrol officers disparaging him in his absence, as well as hearing from some of the other transferees how rough their new assignment at the 29th is. After her transfer to the 29th, she was initially partnered with Officer Maya Thomas (Yasha Jackson) until Thomas was dismissed after getting caught stealing cash from crime scenes. Eddie subsequently partnered with Officer Rachel Witten (Lauren Patten), whom Frank had dismissed for racial profiling and then reinstated after a few months.

Eddie's mother Lena makes her first appearance in "By Hook or by Crook". Despite her husband's conviction and imprisonment, she has tried to maintain her past wealthy lifestyle. Upon meeting Jamie and learning of Eddie's engagement to him, she openly expresses doubt about his ability to give her the lifestyle she had been raised with. However, she soon warms up to him when Jamie refuses to be intimidated by her and is happy with the relationship.

The Season 9 finale, "Something Blue", ends at the start of the wedding Mass with Archbishop Kearns (Stacy Keach) officiating; as Armin remains incarcerated, Frank walks Eddie down the aisle at her request. In the Season 10 premiere, after she and Jamie referred to herself as "Eddie Janko-Reagan" a few times, they decided she would remain "Officer Janko" on the job and "Mrs. Reagan" at home. Upon the couple's return to duty after the wedding, their precinct commander, Captain Espinoza (Luis Antonio Ramos), switched Eddie and Officer Rachel Witten (Lauren Patten) to the night shift under Sergeant McNichols (Stephanie Kurtzuba) to remove Eddie from Jamie's chain of command. In later episodes, however, Eddie is still seen to be under Jamie's authority, for example assigning her to work with her new partner, Luis Badillo (Ian Quinlan), who had difficulty after the death of an earlier partner on the job, in the hope that she can help him the same way she helped Jamie after the death of his previous partner.

At the beginning of the series finale, Badillo is killed in action as part of a gang attack while responding to a call with Eddie. At the end of the series finale, Eddie reveals to the family that she and Jamie are expecting their first child.

In the spinoff Boston Blue, it is revealed that she gave birth to a boy named Joey Francis Reagan. As a uniformed patrol officer, Eddie drives a patrol car on duty and carries a Glock 19 in 9×19mm as her duty weapon. Her shield number is 68921. As of Season 9 she is wearing the NYPD Excellent Police Duty award. In "Absolute Power" & "Identity", Eddie's father Armin was portrayed by William Sadler.

=== Other Reagans ===
==== Appearing ====
- Jack Reagan, Danny and Linda's older son, born circa Fall 2000. He is portrayed by Tony Terraciano. In season 9 Episode 5 "Thicker than Water", Jack begins attending (the fictional) Hadleigh College, somewhere outside the immediate New York City metropolitan area.
- Sean Reagan, Danny and Linda's younger son, born circa 2003. He is portrayed by Andrew Terraciano, Tony's younger brother. He starts attending college in Season 11. Through a school project, he discovered a male first cousin born from his late uncle Joe. In the spinoff Boston Blue, he is portrayed by Mika Amonsen and has become a patrol officer in the Boston police force.
- Joseph "Joe" Hill, Joe Reagan's son with Paula Hill, a classmate at the Police Academy who dropped out after learning she was pregnant, without ever letting Joe know about the baby. Joseph is portrayed by Will Hochman. The Reagan family did not learn of his existence until 2020 when Sean, in a school project on family ancestry, took a DNA test that revealed a hit on a male first cousin. Hill is a 2016 graduate of the academy who quickly rose to detective by 2020, at 24 the youngest in the Firearms Investigation Unit. His shield number is 9173. Frank invites both Joe Hill and his mother to meet the whole family at the next Sunday dinner, but after Frank turns down her request to have him transferred to a safer assignment, she declines the invitation for both. Sean takes the initiative to invite Joseph to Sunday Dinner at the end of "Family Secrets", the Season 10 finale. Early in Season 11, Joe Hill's connection to the Reagan family is made public. He tells the family that he's taking some time away from the job because he's being treated differently by his colleagues. In reality, Joe has accepted a Federal undercover assignment for the ATF, something that only Frank and Jamie know about. This assignment becomes known to the rest of the family in the final two episodes of Season 11. Following the assignment's completion, he returns to his family and comes to accept them, as well as his heritage.

==== Mentioned but not portrayed on-screen ====
- Detective 1st Grade Joseph Conor Reagan, son of Frank and Mary, younger brother of Danny, Erin, and older brother of Jamie (season 8 episode 7 Frank incorrectly calls Joe the oldest). Joe was a member of the NYPD Warrants Squad partnered with Detective Sonny Malevsky (Michael T. Weiss). He was a graduate of John Jay College of Criminal Justice. He was killed on May 15, 2009, by Sonny when Joe learned that he was the leader of a corrupt gang of police officers called the Blue Templar. Joe's shield, number 46808, was retired after his death in the line of duty. In "Cursed", the Reagans decided to reinstate the number when an officer made a request to wear it in honor of her late father who had the same number in Boston. In "Family Secrets" it is revealed that he had a son, with a classmate at the Police Academy, Paula Hill, who didn't let him know. Paula named their son Joseph Hill, after his father; his son eventually joined the force too. In "In the Name of the Father", Frank reveals to Joe Hill that his father considered joining the NYPD under the name "Joseph Conor", his middle name "from his mother's side", to avoid the scrutiny associated with the Reagan name within the department.
- Mary Margaret Reagan (née Conor), Frank's late wife of 40 years and the mother of his four children, Danny, Erin, Joe, and Jamie. She died on September 14, 2005, of cancer. In "Fathers and Sons", it is mentioned that her grandfather helped build the Brooklyn Bridge in the 1870s and '80s.
- Betty Reagan (née Riley), Henry's wife of 46 years and the mother of Peter and Frank. She died on December 2, 2001. In "By Hook or by Crook", it is mentioned that she was born in Ireland, the oldest of 12 children where there was never enough food, and met Henry after moving to New York to make more money. The Sunday family dinners are her legacy of having overcome the struggle of childhood poverty.
- Peter Christopher Reagan, Henry and Betty's oldest son and Frank's older brother. He died of leukemia when he was only a few months old.

== Recurring characters ==
=== Recurring ===
Actor	Character	Seasons													
Actor	Character	1	2	3	4	5	6	7	8	9	10	11	12	13	14
Tony Terraciano	Jack Reagan	Recurring	Recurring	Recurring	Recurring	Recurring	Recurring	Recurring	Recurring	Guest	Guest	Guest	Guest	Guest	Guest
Andrew Terraciano	Sean Reagan	Recurring	Recurring	Recurring	Recurring	Recurring	Recurring	Recurring	Recurring	Recurring	Recurring	Recurring	Recurring	Recurring	Recurring
Robert Clohessy	Lieutenant Sidney "Sid" Gormley	Recurring	Recurring	Recurring	Recurring	Recurring	Recurring	Recurring	Recurring	Recurring	Recurring	Recurring	Recurring	Recurring	Recurring
Gregory Jbara	Deputy Commissioner Garrett Moore	Guest	Recurring	Recurring	Recurring	Recurring	Recurring	Recurring	Recurring	Recurring	Recurring	Recurring	Recurring	Recurring	Recurring
Abigail Hawk	Detective Abigail Baker	Recurring	Recurring	Recurring	Recurring	Recurring	Recurring	Recurring	Recurring	Recurring	Recurring	Recurring	Recurring	Recurring	Recurring
Nicholas Turturro	Sergeant Anthony Renzulli	Recurring	Recurring	Recurring	Guest	Guest	Guest								
Bruce Altman	Mayor Robert Levitt	Recurring		Guest											
Dylan Moore	Sydney Davenport	Recurring													
David Ramsey	Mayor Carter Poole		Recurring	Recurring	Guest	Guest	Guest	Guest							
John Rue	Ed Hines		Guest	Recurring											
John Ventimiglia	Dino Arbogast		Recurring	Guest	Recurring										
Victor Slezak	Bureau Chief Bryce Helfond			Recurring	Guest			Guest		Guest					
Sebastian Sozzi	Officer Vincent "Vinny" Cruz			Recurring											
Peter Hermann	Jack Boyle			Guest	Guest			Guest	Guest	Guest	Guest	Guest		Recurring	Guest
Megan Ketch	Detective Kate Lansing			Recurring											
Amy Morton	Trial Bureau Chief ADA Amanda Harris			Guest	Recurring										
Bebe Neuwirth	Kelly Peterson				Recurring				Guest	Guest					
Holt McCallany	District Attorney Robert McCoy				Guest	Recurring									
James Lesure	DA Investigator Alex McBride					Recurring	Guest								
LaTanya Richardson	Lieutenant Dee Ann Carver					Recurring									
Steve Schirripa	Detective Anthony Abetemarco						Recurring	Recurring	Recurring	Recurring	Recurring	Recurring	Recurring	Recurring	Recurring
Pallavi Sastry	Cameron						Guest	Guest	Recurring	Guest					
Mark Linn-Baker	Carlton Miller							Guest	Recurring						
Tamara Tunie	Monica Graham							Recurring	Guest						
Lorraine Bracco	Mayor Margaret Dutton								Recurring						
Sam Simone	McKenna								Recurring	Guest					
Lauren Patten	Officer Rachel Witten								Guest	Recurring	Guest	Recurring	Guest	Guest	Guest
Aasif Mandvi	District Attorney Samar Charwell									Recurring		Guest			
Justin Walker White	ADA Martin Richardson									Recurring					
Yasha Jackson	Maya Thomas									Recurring					
Fortuna Gebresellasie	Annie									Guest	Recurring	Guest	Guest	Guest	Guest
Stephanie Kurtzuba	Captain Paula McNichols										Guest		Guest	Recurring	Recurring
Eric B.	Mike Gee										Guest	Recurring	Guest	Guest	
Dylan Walsh	Mayor Peter Chase										Recurring	Guest	Guest	Guest	Recurring
Will Hochman	Detective Joseph Hill										Guest	Recurring	Recurring	Recurring	Recurring
Roslyn Ruff	DA Kimberly Crawford											Recurring	Recurring	Guest	Guest
Ian Quinlan	Officer Luis Badillo												Recurring	Recurring	Recurring
James Hiroyuki Liao	Lt. Fleming													Recurring	Guest

=== Associates of Frank ===
==== Abigail Baker ====
Detective 2nd Grade Abigail Baker is a member of the Police Commissioner's (Detective) Squad who serves as Frank's primary aide. She was credited in Season 1 as "Det. Melissa Baker" but was referred to as Abigail throughout the season, and the name was changed in Season 2. Baker is portrayed by Abigail Hawk.

In "Manhattan Queens", Baker was harassed by Suffolk County Police Department Deputy Chief Sal DeLuca, who had a romantic interest in her. In the same episode, it is revealed that she is from Ocean Bay Park and her parents still live there. She speaks fluent Japanese. Frank mentions she is happily married in season 6 when questioned by his former partner Lenny. She subsequently becomes pregnant and gives birth during season 7. Having been with Frank for nine years as of season 8's "Heavy Is the Head", Baker longs for more active detective work despite Frank's assurances that he needs her and often leans on her detective instincts. She receives an offer to work for newly promoted Captain Bullman, who used to be her sergeant, but Frank refuses to let her resign. Frank reluctantly tells Abigail later that he found out Bullman mainly wanted to hire her to have someone in his ranks who could pull favors at 1PP.

Abigail's husband is Officer Brian Baker of the 65th Precinct (played by Jarid Faubel). They have at least two children. In "By Hook or by Crook", Brian is shot and critically wounded by a drug dealer who was released on bail after a murder conviction in Mexico was missed by a background check. Brian recovers, but in "True Blue", he shows signs of PTSD, which strains their marriage, and he is suspended and investigated by Internal Affairs after being caught on camera roughing up a suspect he was arresting.

==== Garrett Moore ====
Before becoming Frank's Deputy Commissioner of Public Information and de facto chief of staff, Garrett was a reporter at the New York Post. He has been married and divorced three times and has a stepson whom he has tried to keep out of trouble. Garrett and Frank have a rather complex relationship; for example, Frank often expresses dismay when Garrett comes into his office unannounced but also seemingly values his perspective. Furthermore, many episodes depict the two debating an issue regarding what information should or should not be released to the public. In "Nightmares", a woman in Atlantic City, New Jersey, accused him of rape, but the allegations were proven to be false when it was revealed that the woman in question was a prostitute who slept with rich married men and then blackmailed them. He is portrayed by Gregory Jbara.

==== Dino Arbogast ====
Formerly the Organized Crime Control Bureau Chief, Dino Arbogast was promoted to Chief of Department (the highest-ranking uniformed police officer) by Frank after the retirement of the previous Chief, Ed Hines. Dino maintains this role for season 4 until the finale, when he is forced to resign after being caught on video committing lewd acts with an escort hired by a recently deceased brothel madam, lying about the situation, and benching Danny in an attempt to keep his actions from being discovered. He is last seen in his backyard setting his uniform on fire. He is portrayed by John Ventimiglia.

==== Sidney Gormley ====
The Supervisor of the 54th Precinct's Detective Squad, Sergeant Sidney Gormley was Danny's boss for over four years. He was frequently exasperated by his subordinate. He lives in New Hyde Park with his wife, Sheila (Cady Huffman), has a son Brendan, a currently unnamed daughter, and, according to the certificate in his office, is a graduate of New York University. In "Flags of Our Fathers", Gormley mentions that he is a veteran, and that he lost a grandfather and two uncles in the service.

Early in season 5, Gormley is reassigned by Frank to One Police Plaza and appointed as Dino's replacement as chief of department. However, due to Gormley only being a Sergeant at the time, and therefore not being high enough in rank to be eligible for chief of department (who must be at least a captain or higher), he is given the job title "Special Assistant to the Commissioner", which gives him the authorities of the chief of department though not the pay grade or privileges. In this capacity, Gormley acts as Frank's liaison to the rank and file. He is later on promoted to lieutenant. He is portrayed by Robert Clohessy.

==== Robert Levitt ====
The Mayor of New York City who appointed Frank Reagan to the position of New York City Police Commissioner. He lost the 2011 election to Carter Poole (David Ramsey), who succeeded him as mayor. While he is credited as the character "Frank Russo" in Season 1, his name is never actually mentioned. He makes a return appearance in Season 3 when his daughter is arrested by Jamie and Vinny for smoking pot. Here, his character is introduced as "Former Mayor Robert Levitt". He is portrayed by Bruce Altman.

==== Carter Poole ====
Elected to the position of Mayor of New York City in 2011, Carter Poole and Frank butt heads on occasion, but the two have a mutual respect for each other that Poole says went back to his childhood when Frank was a beat cop in his neighborhood and used to look out for the children. In "Parenthood", it is mentioned that he attended Yale University and that he has an illegitimate daughter who does not know about him, aside from the fact that he is the mayor. In "This Way Out", he's shot in an assassination attempt during a town hall meeting by a mentally-challenged teenager who was tricked by a member of the Los Lordes gang operating out of the Bitterman Housing Projects. The shooting leaves the mayor paralyzed from the waist down, confining him to a wheelchair, but does not prevent him from discharging his duties as mayor. In 2015, he is reelected for another term as mayor. In 2017, he resigns as mayor because he is burned out and feels he is not the man to lead the city any longer. He is portrayed by David Ramsey.

==== Margaret Dutton ====
The New York City Public Advocate under Mayor Carter Poole, Margaret Dutton ascended to the position of interim Mayor of New York City in 2017 after the Mayor's resignation. She is portrayed by Lorraine Bracco. As mayor, she is aided by Carlton Miller, who is portrayed by Mark Linn-Baker.

==== Peter Chase ====
The Mayor of New York City as of Season 10. Introduced as the Mayor-elect in "Friends in High Places". His first encounter with a member of the Reagan family, after winning the election in a landslide, is with Erin when he offers his endorsement for her to run for election as District Attorney; Erin eventually learns that she is only one of four Assistant DAs to whom Chase has made that offer. Frank's first encounter with Chase is when Chase informs him that he intends to keep him on as Commissioner and that he would like to reinstate Frank's Stop and Frisk program among other more hardline law enforcement policies to protect the NYC tourist industry. He does add one condition: that Frank replaces Garrett Moore as DCPI with a more hardline deputy commissioner from a list of candidates provided by Chase. Simultaneously, Garrett receives an unsolicited job offer for the head of institutional advancement at Duke University; he and Frank do some checking and discover that Chase's wife is on the board of directors at Duke. Frank and Garrett stand firm on Garrett staying, with a counteroffer to hire one of Chase's nominees as an assistant. Chase accepts, but tells them that once he is sworn in, "what I say goes." He is portrayed by Dylan Walsh.

==== Kelly Peterson ====
The Inspector General of the NYPD, portrayed by Bebe Neuwirth. Kelly is a former member of the Essex County Prosecutor's Office in New Jersey. In the season 4 finale, Peterson tells Commissioner Reagan about her intent to resign, after finding that she does not have enough "professional animosity" toward the NYPD due to becoming too close to Frank. In season 8, Peterson returns as the Corporation Counsel of New York City.

==== Regina Thomas ====
The Speaker of the New York City Council, portrayed by Whoopi Goldberg. She is an often adversary, sometimes ally of Frank in his conflicts with the Office of the Mayor and other city offices and agencies and with the Council itself.

==== Martin Mendez ====
The Governor of New York, known for his thin skin, which Frank describes as "thinner skin than a grape", and tendency to "overreach". He is portrayed by David Zayas.

==== Archbishop Kevin Kearns ====
The Archbishop of New York, Kevin Kearns occasionally comes to Frank for help with delicate matters involving the city archdiocese or one of its members. He also officiated Jamie's marriage to Eddie in season 9. He is portrayed by Stacy Keach.

==== Stan Rourke ====
Fire Commissioner Stan Rourke, Frank's counterpart in the Fire Department of the City of New York (FDNY), portrayed by Dan Lauria. The two have a testy and sometimes openly hostile relationship stemming from the nearly centuries-old rivalry between the two departments. In "With Friends Like These" (Season 6 Episode 4), a brawl between police and firefighters at a crime scene escalates into open unwillingness of both departments to cooperate with each other. In "Friends in High Places" (Season 10 Episode 8), Rourke and several of his senior officers are arrested by the NYPD after a retirement party for one of the officers gets out of hand.

==== Senior NYPD officers ====
- First Deputy Commissioner Vincenzo, NYPD: Frank's second-in-command; he was considered for the position of New York City Police Commissioner, but the Mayor ultimately appointed Frank to the position. He is portrayed by John Bedford Lloyd.
- Chief of Department & former Chief of Detectives Ed Hines, NYPD (Ret. 2013): The highest-ranking uniformed police officer; he is portrayed by John Rue.
- Bureau Chief Bryce Helfond, NYPD: The NYPD Chief of Intelligence; he is portrayed by Victor Slezak
- Assistant Chief Donald Kent: The Chief of the NYPD Gang Division and a longtime friend of Frank; the day he was promoted to Assistant Chief, he and Maggie, his wife of 30 years, were killed in a drive-by the Warrior Kings gang. He was portrayed by Dennis Haysbert.
- Deputy Chief Trevor Jackson: The longtime commander of the New York City Police Department Emergency Service Unit who was forced into mandatory retirement at the age of 63. He is portrayed by Isaiah Washington.

=== Associates of Danny ===
==== Jackie Curatola ====
Detective 1st Grade Jackie Curatola was Danny's previous partner; she is divorced and is regularly the recipient of passes or ogling from her uniformed colleagues and perps alike, much to her annoyance. In 2012, Jackie took early retirement from the NYPD after starting to show signs of burning out. As a detective with the NYPD, Jackie carried a Glock 19 in 9×19mm as her duty weapon. As of 2023, Jackie is a police chief in a small town. She is portrayed by Jennifer Esposito.

==== Kate Lansing ====
Assigned to replace Detective Curatola in 2012, Detective Kate Lansing worked with Danny for almost three months. She transferred back to Internal Affairs after the arrest of Captain Derek Elwood (Nestor Serrano), who framed Danny for possession of narcotics in order to prevent him from discovering his gambling problem. She is portrayed by Megan Ketch.

==== Maria Baez ====
Danny's partner since 2013 (and someone he's known for 20 years), Detective 1st Grade Maria Baez previously spent three years with the NYPD's Joint Bank Robbery Task Force until it was disbanded in 2011. In "Bad Blood", it is revealed that she has an older brother, Javier (Kirk Acevedo), who is a recovering drug addict, and her mother, Carmen Baez (Saundra Santiago), and her sister, Ana Baez (Liza Colón-Zayas), are introduced in "Stomping Grounds". Before transferring to the 54th Precinct, Maria fell hard for Detective Jimmy Mosely (Johnathon Schaech), but their relationship fizzled out when he refused to leave his wife for her.

In "Partners", Javier revealed that he is an informant for the DEA against a drug cartel; he dies saving Maria's life in a raid on that cartel. In "Love Stories", she and Danny are awarded the NYPD Medal for Valor for their actions in "Partners". During season 6, Danny claims that Baez has difficulty establishing or maintaining romantic relationships. In the season 12 finale "Silver Linings", Baez adopts a newborn baby girl, whose biological mother Elena Marquez was assassinated with a bomb on the orders of Arturo Muñoz, whom she was testifying against. She is portrayed by Marisa Ramirez.

In the pilot of spin-off Boston Blue, it is revealed that she and Danny have now been in a long-term committed romantic relationship for about a year, with Danny telling his new partner in Boston that he had at first been hesitant at first to get involved with Baez after the death of his wife "even though there were obviously feelings there," but had pursued the relationship following the advice of his grandfather Henry in the series finale.

==== Dee Ann Carver ====
The new Commander of the 54th Precinct's Detective Squad, Lieutenant Dee Ann Carver is Danny's strict, by-the-book boss who took over after Sgt. Gormley was transferred to 1PP. She is the adoptive mother of a baby girl whose father committed suicide in front of her and Danny, despite their best efforts to talk him down. She is portrayed by LaTanya Richardson Jackson.

==== Mike Gee ====
Mike Gee is a 20+ year veteran on the police force who initially retired, but went back to work after his son was diagnosed with an illness. Introduced as a fellow detective at the 54th, he was promoted to lieutenant and commanding officer of the 54th Precinct Detective Squad by the season 11 episode "Triumph Over Trauma". Portrayed by Eric B.

==== Waylon Gates ====
Gates is a Texas Ranger who has traveled to New York to work with Danny, first to arrest a Texas fugitive who is involved with a New York drug gang (Season 10 Episode 14 "Fog of War"), then to lead a task force to intercept a drug shipment that has slipped through the US-Mexico border (Season 12 Episode 10 "Old Friends"). Danny and Gates frequently trade barbs but have a generally amicable relationship with mutual respect, particularly since both are former Marines, with Gates being a graduate of Marine Sniper School. Portrayed by Lyle Lovett.

==== Maggie Gibson ====
Maggie is a medium who occasionally helps Danny and Baez with their cases. Maggie openly encourages Danny to move on following Linda's death, making Baez suspicious of her motives. Portrayed by Callie Thorne.

=== Associates of Erin ===
==== Jack Boyle ====
Erin's ex-husband and Nicky's father, Jack Boyle is a formidable defense attorney. Due to his actions after the divorce (including moving away and not keeping in contact with his daughter), Jack is not very well liked by the adults in the Reagan family (although his nephews, Jack and Sean, are both excited to see him when he returns to New York). When Danny was framed for narcotics possession, Henry hired Jack as his attorney.

Jack and Erin briefly got back together after surviving a courtroom hostage crisis, but Erin ended it when it became clear that Jack was only interested in casual dating and didn't want to commit to a marriage.

Jack did return in 2017 to represent a man that Erin was trying to convict. This time Jack came out on top. Erin also learned of Jack's relationship with a woman who is a few years older than Nicky, which did not last long. In later seasons, it is revealed that Jack and Erin were continuing to see each other in a casual relationship. Jack is portrayed by Peter Hermann.

==== Anthony Abetemarco ====
A retired detective for the DA's Investigations Unit who assists Erin with her cases. He and Danny don't personally get along, but are willing to work together when necessary. In "Friends in Need" it is revealed that his cousin is Joey Ruscoli / Razzano (Anthony DeSando), and his aunt is Sophia Ruscoli (Catherine Wolf). In "Good Cop Bad Cop" it is revealed that his mother is Lucille Abetemarco (Suzanne Shepherd). In "The Brave" it is revealed that his ex-wife is Vivian Abetemarco and his daughter is Sophia Abetemarco (Isabel Harper Leight). In "Disrupted" the role of Vivian Abetemarco is from thus on played by Kate Miller. In "Past Tense" it is revealed that his long-lost former mobster half-brother is Leo Stutz (Erick Betancourt). He is portrayed by Steve Schirripa.

===== Notes =====
- In "The Brave" the role of his ex-wife Vivian Abetemarco is originally portrayed by Diana Bologna.

==== Charles Rosselini ====
Erin's boss in the first season, Charles Rosselini is the New York County District Attorney with aspirations of higher office. He is portrayed by Bobby Cannavale.

==== Amanda Harris ====
The Bureau Chief of the Manhattan District Attorney's Trial Bureau, Amanda Harris promoted Erin to Deputy Bureau Chief. She almost fires Erin after she calls her out on violating Brady Rules by not providing the defense with video footage that may have exonerated a previous rape suspect; Harris ends up keeping Erin, saying that she needs someone like her to keep her in check. Regardless of this, Harris is eventually arrested after Erin finds out that she has a long-standing deal with a recently deceased high-profile madam who has her people seduce high-profile New Yorkers of major influence – like high-level cops, politicians, pro athletes, and various celebrities – and get them on tape in order to guarantee their assistance whenever she needs it. (Whether this assistance is solely for cases or possibly for darker, personal reasons is left open to speculation.) She is portrayed by Amy Morton.

==== Robert McCoy ====
A defense attorney Erin met on a speed-date. He was an Assistant District Attorney in Brooklyn for twelve years before leaving to join private practice in 2008. After Bureau Chief Amanda Harris was fired, McCoy was appointed the interim New York County District Attorney. This caused Erin to break off their relationship, saying she can't sleep with her boss. As the interim DA, McCoy came into conflict with Commissioner Reagan when he announced that the DA's office did not plan on prosecuting petty marijuana possession charges. He is portrayed by Holt McCallany.

==== Samar Charwell ====
District Attorney Samar "Sam" Charwell is Erin's new boss after she is promoted to Bureau Chief in season 9. At the beginning of season 11 he's fired and prosecuted for corruption. He is played by Aasif Mandvi.

==== Alex McBride ====
A member of the DA's Investigations Unit who assists Erin with her cases. In 1995, McBride's mother was murdered in an unsolved robbery. When Erin finds the case in a cold-case pile, she runs DNA found at the scene, which reveals what McBride already suspected but was afraid to confirm: that his father had been responsible. He is portrayed by James Lesure.

==== Annie ====
Annie is Erin's assistant after she is promoted to Bureau Chief. She is played by Fortuna Gebresellasie.

==== Kimberly Crawford ====
Crawford is appointed DA instead of Erin when both are up for the position following Charwell's dismissal. She and Erin establish an antagonistic relationship. Portrayed by Roslyn Ruff.

=== Associates of Jamie ===
==== Vinny Cruz ====
Officer Vincent "Vinny" Cruz, shield number 59910, is Jamie's partner in season 3. He's a child of the Bitterman housing projects in Brooklyn. In "The Bitter End", he is killed when he and Jamie are lured by a purse snatcher into the Bitterman projects, and Vinny is shot by a sniper on a rooftop. He is posthumously promoted to Detective 1st Grade. He was portrayed by Sebastian Sozzi.

==== Eddie Janko ====
See entry in "Reagan family" section above.

==== Anthony Renzulli ====
Jamie's first partner and Training Officer, Sergeant Tony Renzulli knows the beat of his precinct very well and often offers Jamie good advice when he needs it. He believes Jamie will make a great cop, and often pokes fun at him for abandoning a lucrative law career. He was also the Training Officer for Joe. In season 3, he moves to an apparent desk job managing the patrolmen of the 12th Precinct. He is married, and has a side job painting to make extra money; he is also a gambler, but quit after Frank bailed him out of a $3,000 debt (with it made clear that this is a one-time offer). He is portrayed by Nicholas Turturro.

==== Robert Espinoza ====
Captain Robert Espinoza is the Commander of the 29th Precinct and Jamie's immediate superior starting in Season 9 Episode 2 "Meet the New Boss", who requested his assignment as new blood to help clean out corruption in the ranks of the patrol officers. He is played by Luis Antonio Ramos.

=== Others ===
==== Darnell Potter ====
An obnoxious community social-activist preacher, who feels it is his duty to protect people of color (particularly those in his neighborhood) from the brutality and racial profiling of the NYPD. In "Excessive Force", when a criminal Danny was pursuing purposely jumped out a window and falsely claimed that Danny pushed him. Potter, seeking to further his own agenda, relocated a young witness and his entire illegal family, and demanded to Commissioner Reagan to have his son take an early retirement. Potter is nearly arrested by Commissioner Reagan for witness tampering, but Frank lets him off with a warning in order for him to save face with his congregation. In Season 7's "Unbearable Loss", Potter suffers a personal tragedy when his teenage son, Michael, is murdered by one of the youths he once sheltered; Frank consoles him, revealing that his son Joe was killed by a corrupt cop. This, along with Danny's successful capture of the killer, softens some of Potter's bitterness towards the Reagans. Darnell Potter is portrayed by Ato Essandoh.
