= Blue Bloods season 5 =

Season of television series

Blue Bloods
- Season 5
- Region 1 DVD cover art
- No. of episodes: 22

Release
- Original network: CBS
- Original release: September 26, 2014 – May 1, 2015

Season chronology
- ← Previous; Season 4 Next → Season 6

The fifth season of Blue Bloods, a police procedural drama series created by Robin Green and Mitchell Burgess, premiered on CBS September 26, 2014, and concluded on May 1, 2015. Leonard Goldberg serves as executive producer. CBS had renewed the series for a fifth season on March 13, 2014, with a 22-episode order. The series aired its 100th episode ("Baggage") during the fifth season.

On May 11, 2015, CBS renewed Blue Bloods for a sixth season.

== Cast ==
Donnie Wahlberg (Danny Reagan), Bridget Moynahan (Erin Reagan), Will Estes (Jamie Reagan) and Len Cariou (Henry Reagan) are first credited. Amy Carlson (Linda Reagan) and Sami Gayle (Nicky Reagan-Boyle) are credited next, marking the first season they have been included in the opening credits. Tom Selleck (Frank Reagan) receives an "and" billing at the close of the main title sequence.

Marisa Ramirez continued into season 5 as Danny's partner Detective Maria Baez, and she receives an "also starring" billing. Vanessa Ray, who was listed as a "special guest star" in season 4 as Jamie's partner Eddie Janko, receives "also starring" status for season 5. Appearing regularly and receiving "special guest star" billing are Gregory Jbara as Deputy Commissioner of Public Information Garrett Moore, Robert Clohessy as Lt. Sidney Gormley, and Abigail Hawk as Detective Baker, Frank's primary aide.

=== Main ===
- Tom Selleck as New York City Police Commissioner Francis "Frank" Reagan
- Donnie Wahlberg as Detective 1st Grade Daniel "Danny" Reagan
- Bridget Moynahan as ADA Erin Reagan
- Will Estes as Officer Jamison "Jamie" Reagan
- Len Cariou as New York City Police Commissioner Henry Reagan (Retired)
- Amy Carlson as Linda Reagan
- Sami Gayle as Nicole "Nicky" Reagan-Boyle
- Marisa Ramirez as Detective 1st Grade Maria Baez
- Vanessa Ray as Officer Edit "Eddie" Janko

=== Recurring ===
- Abigail Hawk as Detective 1st Grade Abigail Baker
- Gregory Jbara as Deputy Commissioner of Public Information Garrett Moore
- Robert Clohessy as Sergeant/ Lieutenant Sidney "Sid" Gormley
- Nicholas Turturro as Sergeant Anthony Renzulli
- Bebe Neuwirth as Kelly Peterson
- Ato Essandoh as Reverend Darnell Potter
- Tony Terraciano as Jack Reagan
- Andrew Terraciano as Sean Reagan

== Broadcast ==
The season airs simultaneously on CTV in Canada. In Africa, it began airing on Dstv on October 23, 2014. In the United Kingdom and Ireland, it began on Sky Atlantic on November 5, 2014.

== Episodes ==
No. overall	No. in season	Title	Directed by	Written by	Original release date	Prod. code	U.S. viewers (millions)
90	1	"Partners"	David M. Barrett	Siobhan Byrne-O'Connor	September 26, 2014	501	10.88
While Danny and Baez are part of a convoy escorting an undercover moving van transporting $30 million worth of confiscated narcotics, they are ambushed by gunmen, injuring Baez, and killing the driver of the truck. As she and Danny try to uncover a DEA mole, Maria is upset to later find out that her brother Javi is involved with the drug cartel. But Javi reveals he has been a DEA informant for the past three months. As the partners infiltrate a building housing the drugs, Maria sees that Javi is working both sides. When a cartel member fires at Maria, however, Javi steps in front and takes the fatal bullet. Elsewhere, Jamie must make a decision between acting on his newly realized feelings for Eddie or keeping her as a partner, after Renzulli reminds him how a romantic relationship between partners is strictly forbidden. Frank is put in a tough spot after a highly commended lieutenant and former partner of Gormley gives the order for a crazed man in the middle of Times Square to be tazed, causing the man to fall into the path of an oncoming van and get killed. While Mayor Poole advises Frank to be deliberately ambiguous at a press conference, Gormley verbally attacks Frank for not defending his friend and former partner.
91	2	"Forgive and Forget"	Eric Laneuville	Willie Reale	October 3, 2014	503	10.85
Officer Kara Walsh, the woman who confessed to seeing her partner, Officer Randy Cutter, use an unauthorized chokehold that killed a man in custody (see episode 4x20 "Custody Battle"), is back on the job and is being shunned by fellow officers. This includes Eddie, who calls Walsh a "rat" and becomes angered when Jamie offers to be Kara's temporary partner. When Jamie and Kara get in a shootout while responding to an armed robbery at a local pharmacy, nearby officers ignore the call for backup. Eddie and her temporary partner eventually get from the other side of the precinct service area, arriving in time to see Kara take a bullet. Jamie then makes it clear to the rest of the precinct that if they keep disrespecting Kara, then they will have to answer to him. Danny attends the funeral for a girl who was shot by a gang member eight years earlier in a case that was assigned to him. The shooter, Damon, was a juvenile at the time and served only a short sentence. When the autopsy shows the bullet was the ultimate cause of the girl's delayed death, her father Marcus (played by Eric Laneuville, who also directed this episode) urges Danny to reopen the case as a murder. Erin gets the go-ahead from her office, but upon meeting with Damon, she sees how he has turned his life around and is running a center for at-risk youths. Danny gets ticked off when Erin is reluctant to prosecute. Elsewhere, Frank gets news of old friend detective Christopher Scanlon being involved in the accidental shooting of his own partner, Jimmy. Garrett says the partner's blood alcohol level was twice the legal limit, but there is no breathalyzer data for Chris. Frank suspects a cover-up, after finding out Chris is four months from retirement with a full pension.
92	3	"Burning Bridges"	John Behring	Ian Biederman	October 10, 2014	502	11.09
A detective at Danny's precinct is unwillingly outed as gay after attempting to stop a hate crime at a gay bar he was patronizing, causing his partner to refuse to work with him. This forces Sgt. Gormley to temporarily split up Danny and Maria, assigning each to one of the squabbling partners. In a related matter, Henry and a nun from St. Dominic's, Frank's childhood school, convince Frank to use his friendship with the local archbishop to try and save the school from being closed due to budget cuts. When a recent assault is classified as a hate crime due to the victim being gay, a reporter's question backs Frank into a corner, causing Frank to admit that he thinks the Catholic church is "behind the times" in its stance on homosexuality. Meanwhile, a young detective that Jamie was a rookie with and who stole a collar from him does it again. Jamie finds a way to get back at the detective, with help from Erin.
93	4	"Excessive Force"	Alex Zakrzewski	Brian Burns	October 17, 2014	504	10.70
After chasing a robbery suspect into an apartment building, Danny watches as the young man hurls himself out a third floor window, breaking his leg on the ground, before screaming that Danny pushed him out the window. A crowd gathers in support of the man and begin cursing at Danny, who looks confusedly out the broken glass. Reverend Potter, who has chastised the NYPD's methods before, begins a crusade to get Danny fired and builds up scores of supporters. Danny finds out that a young boy named Ernesto, who lives in the building, witnessed the suspect jumping out the window, but when he goes to talk to the boy, he learns the family has moved for fear of being deported. Frank meets with Potter, who tells him that he'll make everything go away if he fires Danny. But further investigation leads Frank and Danny to learn that Potter is now housing Ernesto's family, and that Ernesto has changed his story. They are able to get a warrant for witness tampering from Erin, and after assurances that they will not deport his family, Ernesto tells the truth to the press. Frank confronts Potter with the charges, but ultimately just warns him and lets him save face with his flock. Elsewhere, Eddie suggests that Jamie turn on the charm to get information from an attractive E.R. doctor, but she then appears to get jealous when Jamie makes a date with the woman. After stern rejections, Eddie finally admits she was a little jealous. Jamie says they have something special going as partners and friends and hopes encounters don't "get weird" between them, after which they agree to keep matters neutral. Also, Gormley thinks he is being transferred after standing up for Danny and his precinct in a heated CompStat meeting. Instead, Frank offers Gormley the position of Special Assistant to the Commissioner, effectively replacing Dino Arbogast as Chief of Department.
94	5	"Loose Lips"	Alex Chapple	Daniel Truly	October 24, 2014	505	11.42
While out jogging, Jamie encounters a young woman with a black eye, sitting on a bench and weeping. She is afraid to say anything, so Jamie hands her his card and plans to get her into police custody. However, before he can, she suddenly vanishes. The woman later ends up in the hospital hours later, severely beaten, with Danny and Maria paying her a visit. She dies before she can tell them the name of her killer, but not before she says that he will certainly be out to kill Jamie for simply talking to her. Suspicion falls on the boyfriend, a club bouncer named Little G, but he seems genuinely upset when Danny and Maria tell him the news of the girl's death. He mentions an ex-boyfriend named Price, who continued to stalk and harass the girl after she broke up with him. Jamie refuses to accept a desk assignment for protection, and his car is fire-bombed that night, with he and Eddie narrowly escaping. Danny and Maria arrest Price at his auto shop, where he pushes Maria. With three charges now against Price, Erin tries to get him arraigned, but the judge declares all evidence circumstantial and lets Price walk. After Price gives "the eye" to Jamie in the precinct, Eddie goes after him. The next day, while talking to Jamie on the phone, Eddie is kidnapped by Price, forcing Danny, Maria and Jamie to quickly try to save her. Elsewhere, social media affects both Nicky and Henry. Nicky loses a chance at admission to Rutgers due to some disparaging Tweets she made about a rude teacher in her school (though after meeting said teacher in person, Erin turns to her daughter and admits, "You're not kidding!"), while Henry causes a stink when he's secretly caught on cameraphone making a comment to a friend about how the cops would knock around some low-lifes in his day to get information, regarding how he would handle Jamie's situation. This puts Frank in a difficult position when the clip gets posted to the Internet and he and Henry end up trading words at Sunday dinner.
95	6	"Most Wanted"	Ralph Hemecker	Bryan Goluboff	October 31, 2014	506	11.39
During a road rage incident, an internationally-wanted crime boss named Zoran Brasha beats a truck driver with a tire iron. The case is of particular interest to Frank and Danny, given that Brasha has been arrested for other violent crimes in New York and has always been able to escape conviction by intimidating victims, killing off witnesses or getting others on his crime team to take the rap for him. As Erin prepares to prosecute Brasha, she meets his lawyer, a woman who was her college classmate. When Brasha threatens his latest victim's family and is able to get bail, Erin confronts her friend, convinced she is aware of the witness tampering. Danny and Maria have to take another angle to produce evidence against Brasha, but are racing against the clock as he prepares to leave the country. Meanwhile, Erin has been considering leaving the DA's office and getting into private practice, especially after adding up what Nicky's college will cost. For her part, Nicky chooses to stay in New York to attend Columbia and live with a friend who also got in, which will at least reduce her living expenses. Elsewhere, Frank asks Jamie to participate in an NYPD-FDNY charity boxing match, fighting in Danny's old weight class, after a fellow officer who was in line to box injures his ankle. Danny meets his new by-the-book boss, Lt. Dee Ann Carver (LaTanya Richardson), and she says she's not particularly fond of what she's heard about his methods in working cases.
96	7	"Shoot the Messenger"	David M. Barrett	Siobhan Byrne-O'Connor	November 7, 2014	507	11.51
Lt. Carver wants to ride along with each of her detectives, and Danny is first in line. While investigating a drive-by shooting at a playground, they find a young mother has been gunned down but her baby is unharmed. A young man tries to flee, though in an interview with Danny later, he identifies himself as Rudy, the father of the now motherless baby. He says that the mother became a target when her ex-boyfriend got out of prison, knowing that the baby was too young to be his, and Rudy fears he is next. Danny gets Rudy to I.D. the drug-dealing former boyfriend, but Carver becomes irate over his techniques. Elsewhere, Jamie and Eddie find a young woman who has apparently hanged herself. But further investigation shows she was the victim of sexual harassment by her boss at her tavern job, and after she quit, the boss raped and killed her, staging it to look like suicide by hanging. Meanwhile, in an interview on CBS This Morning featuring Frank and newly-appointed D.A. Robert McCoy (Holt McCallany), McCoy states he doesn't plan to prosecute petty marijuana possession charges, and he asks what Frank thinks about that. Frank feels like he was ambushed, and when Erin is ambivalent upon being questioned about it by Frank, her dad correctly surmises that Erin and McCoy are or have been romantically involved.
97	8	"Power of the Press"	Tawnia McKiernan	Ian Biederman	November 21, 2014	508	11.62
As part of a deal made with the NYPD, a drug dealer named Javier Rojas, facing conviction for being an accessory to murder, testifies against drug kingpin Rolando Vega. Though Rojas has been promised witness protection, the feds find a technicality and says the deal is not legally binding, thus putting Rojas back on the street and in danger. Lt. Carver tells Danny and Maria that they have no choice but to obey the Feds' decision, but the two detectives secretly protect Rojas anyway. After avoiding a reporter who wants an exclusive on the Vega conviction, Danny realizes he can use the press to put pressure on the Feds. Elsewhere, Erin meets with Hannah, the daughter of one of her old schoolmates. Hannah says she was raped three months ago at a freshman orientation party by a star soccer player, but did not report it because the dean of students said the school could act on the incident quicker than the cops. The perpetrator walked free, and Erin cannot find any evidence to bring him to trial, but she does find a way to punish the dean and her office for deliberately ignoring evidence in a cover-up attempt. Frank deals with the case of an officer accused of knocking a suspect to the ground, causing a head injury. The officer was wearing a body camera as part of a pilot program, but the camera either malfunctioned or was shut off just prior to the incident. To exonerate the officer, Frank has to convince an unwilling mother in the neighborhood to share a cell phone video that captured what really happened.
98	9	"Under the Gun"	David M. Barrett	Willie Reale & Kevin Wade	December 12, 2014	509	11.09
Danny and Maria investigate the drive-by shootings of three prominent Jewish community leaders. Donald "Don" Stein, a representative of the Jewish community and old friend of Frank's, pressures that the murders to be investigated as hate crimes, but Frank says that the evidence has yet to be found for a hate crime finding. Eventually, Don says they have hired 500 private security officers to guard synagogues, and takes out a newspaper ad stating so. Linda volunteers at a mobile free clinic at a housing project and is mugged. Danny angers her by demanding that she quit her time there. Linda decides to carry a gun and attempts to secretly purchase one but is seen by Jamie when he walks into the gun store. Elsewhere, Erin finds that a gun that was used as a murder weapon disappeared from a locked evidence room and was swapped for another, threatening her case against a gang member. When all signs point to someone within the prosecutor's office being the culprit, Erin learns that her young intern has a brother who used to be in the gang.
99	10	"Sins of the Father"	David M. Barrett	Daniel Truly	January 2, 2015	511	11.61
Donald DeCarlo, a man accused of murdering a police officer in 1976 (while Henry was on the job) but has been in hiding since then, attends the NYPD ceremony for his son's promotion to detective, along with Sgt. Gormley's promotion to Lieutenant. Henry and Frank watch Lt. Gormley interview DeCarlo. He had changed his name years ago and his son was unaware of his involvement. DeCarlo tells Gormley he was on the scene, but says someone behind him pulled the trigger. Henry is certain he saw DeCarlo with the gun. Henry is interviewed and his recollection of events is sketchy. Erin tells Frank she does not think Henry's testimony will stand up to cross-examination, so Frank reluctantly asks DeCarlo's son to try to get a confession out of his father. Danny and Maria investigate the death of a man they suspect was killed over debts to a loan shark. A woman turns up dead soon after and they are found to have worked for a local porn video operation; the investigation turns toward the parents of a young woman from Montana who committed suicide after being fired from the same production company. Elsewhere, Jamie and Eddie are on the scene of a young girl who was struck by a passing van. They see a mob gathering to attack the driver who had returned to the scene. Though the girl has only minor cuts and bruises, the driver's blood-alcohol level is found to be 0.12 (over the legal limit of 0.08), meaning he will be charged. The detective on the case gets a confession from the man. Eddie has interviewed a witness who says there were two people in the van and the person driving was not the person that returned to the scene. Eddie irks the detective, who wants to close the case, while she also gets angry with Jamie when he hints that she may not have conducted the witness interview properly.
100	11	"Baggage"	John Behring	Brian Burns	January 9, 2015	510	12.86
Danny and Linda go to their bank to refinance their home mortgage, but they are rejected. While figuring out why, the bank is robbed by a group of Army veterans. While investigating, Danny hears a waitress who sounds like one of the robbers. He later visits the woman's husband, finding he has no legs and is also suffering from traumatic brain injury resulting from combat. He tells the detectives he has had numerous delays in approval for treatment from the Veteran's Administration, but that his wife was able to come up with $100,000 in a "fundraiser". Danny and Maria realize the bank robbery was the "fundraiser", but they do not let on the soldier. Danny also finds out the woman was cheating on her husband; he gets photographic proof and he uses it as leverage to get her to confess. Each of the robbers ultimately receive five years in prison, while Danny and Frank are able to pull some strings with the VA to get the soldier treated immediately. Meanwhile, the work of a guerilla street artist named Spanky (in the vein of Banksy) is causing public scares in the form of pop-ups that emerge from unattended bags. This creates a rift between Garrett and Gormley on how to treat these actions while maintaining the image of the NYPD. Garrett becomes annoyed when he thinks Frank is favoring Gormley. Ultimately, Spanky is arrested while trying to fly to the UK. Garrett realizes that Gormley was right to treat Spanky's actions as terrorism, and apologizes by asking him to be a speaker at an upcoming lecture series.
101	12	"Home Sweet Home"	Robert Harmon	Bryan Goluboff	January 16, 2015	512	12.61
Jamie and Eddie encounter on the street a homeless 12-year-old boy, who flees from them. When they catch him, he reveals his name is T.J. His mother in Baltimore got in trouble with drugs and sent him to be with his aunt in New York. His aunt is a homeless addict and has been missing for three days. T.J. is certain that his aunt was killed by her boyfriend. Danny and Maria follow up, and find that the boyfriend has an alibi. T.J. is moved to a temporary Children's Services home, where Jamie and Eddie see him reading to the younger children there and acting like a big brother. Danny and Maria find the aunt very much alive, living in a cheap motel room and doing drugs. She complains about her sister always sending T.J. to live with her, oblivious to the fact that she left T.J. to fend for himself on the streets. Jamie and Eddie follow up and decide to tell T.J. the truth. While he is disappointed, T.J. is also happy that a family with younger children wants to adopt him. Elsewhere, Erin refuses to give a plea to a lawyer who is defending a Rikers warden accused of providing drugs to prisoners. DA McCoy takes the case from Erin, claiming her rocky history with the defense attorney is clouding her judgment, and Erin becomes furious after McCoy accepts the plea. She investigates further and finds that several of the warden's colleagues have been involved in a drug ring, while another warden who refused to play along killed himself due to the pressure. She also finds that McCoy's family history with the head of that Rikers cell block played into his decision. Meanwhile, Frank is laid up with an ankle injury, and has to hold a staff meeting at home. Henry becomes upset when Frank appears to shun his advice in front of the group.
102	13	"Love Stories"	Alex Zakrzewski	Siobhan Byrne-O'Connor	January 30, 2015	513	11.87
Danny and Maria investigate when a homeowner shoots an intruder in what appears to be a robbery attempt. Things get complicated when the detectives learn the intruder was a hitman with mob ties, while the homeowner and his wife both had affairs on each other. Elsewhere, Danny finds out Jack has his first crush, and he gives his son advice on how to ask her out. Erin challenges a young attorney who successfully scores a retrial for his mother, whom Erin put away on an accessory to murder charge 12 years ago. While Erin does find that the detective on the case made many mistakes, her department's investigation ultimately finds that the mother was guilty and has been lying to her son for years. Meanwhile, Gormley has submitted Danny and Maria for medals of valor for their actions in "Partners", but Frank is reluctant to decorate his son for fear of backlash against himself and Danny. Henry reveals that he regrets not giving Frank the same medal for a 1988 collar, deciding not to for the same reasons Frank is contemplating.
103	14	"The Poor Door"	Alex Chapple	Willie Reale	February 6, 2015	514	11.32
Danny and Maria investigate the death of Bobby Torres, a resident of the "poor" section of an otherwise upscale apartment building. Maria notes that, to get permits approved faster, developers sometimes offer to allocate 20 percent of a building to low-income housing. It is revealed that Bobby, a young school teacher, was dating the daughter of a wealthy Russian immigrant, Ivan, who rents the building's penthouse. While Ivan has an alibi for the night of Bobby's murder, video surveillance shows him nodding to an unknown man in the lobby that same day. The daughter is shocked when she views the video and recognizes the man as someone who once worked for her father. Jamie and Eddie arrive on the scene of an armed robbery, and get involved in a shootout that injures both a fellow officer and a perp named Wally. Though Wally was unarmed, he is arrested for the robbery attempt and cuffed to his hospital bed. Eddie and Jamie play a game of "bad cop/worse cop", but cannot get Wally to reveal where the shooter might be hiding. After a doctor confirms that Wally will likely die from sepsis caused by the bullet wound, however, he finally confides in Jamie, who in turn offers to help locate Wally's estranged mother before he dies. Elsewhere, Detective Weams, a former colleague of Gormley's, has been photographed by the Daily News driving a $300,000 Ferrari. It appears that Weams has been using his knowledge of what drug houses will be hit to purchase the properties soon after and flip them. What Gormley views as "savvy", Frank views as "shady". It isn't until Gormley visits a family in a shelter that was displaced by one of Weams's schemes that he changes his mind about his former partner.
104	15	"Power Players"	David M. Barrett	Ian Biederman	February 13, 2015	515	11.46
When Erin loses a star witness in a case that will convict mob boss Victor Dano, she and McBride try to get Vincent Rela (Dan Hedaya), a man currently in witness protection, to risk his life and come back to the city and testify. Jamie and Eddie follow up on a tip from a civilian volunteer named Andy about a man selling drugs near a school. While the officers try to apprehend the perp, Andy approaches the man and is shot in the foot. The perp then turns the gun toward Eddie, who shoots and kills him. After the usual hearing, everyone agrees it was a clean shoot, but Jamie can see his partner is having a tough time dealing with her first kill; after criticizing Andy in front of several other cops, Eddie finally breaks down crying in Jamie's arms after asking him to stay at her place for the night. Meanwhile, Mayor Poole asks Frank to "look into" an arrest that involves the husband of a favorite employee. Gormley and Garrett think Frank should invoke "quid pro quo" and use the request to get Poole to quit dragging his feet on increasing the police pension funding.
105	16	"In the Box"	Holly Dale	Brian Burns	February 20, 2015	516	11.60
A man named Anthony Drake is brought to the 54th precinct so that Maria can serve and explain a restraining order placed by the man's wife. Realizing the order will allow the wife to keep him away from their daughter, Anthony takes Maria hostage in the room, demanding that his wife bring his daughter to the station so he can talk to her. When Maria creates a distraction, Danny intervenes and winds up being held in the line of fire himself. Garrett's stepson Sam is arrested trying to buy oxycodone during a sting operation, and Garrett asks Frank to release the young man into his custody so he can get him into rehab. Frank later learns that Garrett has used the pull of 1PP twice before to get his stepson special treatment. Elsewhere, Jamie and Eddie try to raise funds for the funeral of an old man shot by gang members, after learning his wife of 50 years cannot afford a burial. In doing so, they stumble upon a young man who knows what happened but is afraid to say anything.
106	17	"Occupational Hazard"	David M. Barrett	Daniel Truly	March 6, 2015	517	11.03
Erin becomes unnerved when she sees that her apartment may have been burglarized, and her suspicions are confirmed when an unidentified assailant violently attacks a co-worker. When a patch from a local biker gang is left behind at the scene of the attack, Erin tells Danny and Maria about putting away the gang's leader several months ago, and they investigate. Their investigation of that gang turns up nothing, but they later find evidence that a rival biker group had a run-in with the suspected gang, and is trying to frame them. Jamie and Eddie find a pipe bomb in an elderly woman's apartment, but their investigation is derailed by a zealous detective. Complicating things, the elderly woman shows signs of Alzheimer's disease and thinks Eddie is her estranged niece, making any testimony from her unreliable. Elsewhere, Frank and Nicky are eating breakfast and get approached by a young man soliciting donations for a Local Heroes Fund. Frank is quickly suspicious because the fund is using the NYPD logo and he has never heard of them. Frank investigates the fund's director, a woman who appears to be sincere despite never submitting paperwork to become a licensed charity. At Frank's insistence, further investigation by Det. Baker and Lt. Gormley reveals that the woman is using an assumed name and is wanted for running similar fraudulent fundraising operations in three other cities.
107	18	"Bad Company"	Tawnia McKiernan	Bryan Goluboff	March 13, 2015	518	11.07
Danny and Maria learn of a sex slave kidnapping ring, which is luring in young Eastern European women with Web sites for phony hostels. Working with Federal authorities, the detectives determine that Eddie would be the perfect cop to go undercover and allow herself to be kidnapped, but Jamie worries that she isn't yet ready for such a dangerous assignment. As the two discuss Jamie's first undercover assignment in the Sanfino crime family, Jamie reluctantly agrees when Eddie says she wants to prove herself the way he did. Meanwhile, Frank is approached by Sarah Grant, a young woman now in her 20's whom Frank saved as a child early in his career and has kept in touch with him over the years. After asking if Frank will come to her wedding, Sarah comes to Frank after she receives a letter from the inmate who murdered her family when she was seven. The inmate, Donald Berry, wants to meet with Sarah, saying he's found God in prison, but Frank advises against it. Sarah agrees with Frank at first, but then decides she wants to confront Berry once and for all before she gets married. Meanwhile, Henry introduces his new female companion Sylvia (portrayed by Tovah Feldshuh) to Erin, who becomes suspicious after a brief conversation between the three of them. After meeting the woman for lunch and doing some background checks, it appears that Erin's suspicions have merit: she is a serial con artist with an active warrant for her arrest in at least one other state.
108	19	"Through the Looking Glass"	Eric Laneuville	Siobhan Byrne O'Connor	April 3, 2015	519	10.70
A homeless man in the Brownsville section of Brooklyn is set on fire while he sleeps on a park bench, and dies. A zealous reporter named Anne Farrell (played by Leslie Hope) covers the story, and also makes derogatory Tweets about how poorly the NYPD patrols neighborhoods like Brownsville. Frank asks to meet with Anne, but the meeting does not go well and she continues to take issue with the NYPD, and Frank in particular. Farrell then scores an interview with the murder suspect, who says while his face and voice are altered that he set the man on fire as part of a gang initiation, and that she can be certain it will happen again. Farrell claims First Amendment protection, but Erin is able to get a judge to compel Farrell to give up the information in order to prevent a future violent crime from being committed. Farrell refuses to testify and goes to jail, where Frank visits her. He says he has nothing to do with her being in jail, then tries to convince her that her information will save lives. Meanwhile, Danny and Maria are ordered by Lt. Carver to take Charelle, a 16-year-old juvenile offender, along with them as part of the Rescue Ride program. Charelle hates cops, has an attitude and a huge chip on her shoulder, making the ride along unpleasant for all. Their first call is to investigate a drug-related homicide. Danny orders Charelle to stay behind with a uniformed officer but she ignores him, sneaks away and walks in on the grisly crime scene. Danny is very upset when he sees her and she runs away. He goes after Charelle and finds her puking in a garbage can. He tries to show empathy but she blows him off. Charelle later complicates a raid on an apartment building by showing up on her own after seeing the info posted on a board in the squad room. This action prompts Danny and Baez to take her into custody after the incident. Carver asks Danny if he thinks that's the right thing to do. Danny affirms by relaying a story about skipping school and his father letting him get sent to juvenile detention for it, admitting he never skipped school again. Elsewhere, Erin has opened up a 20-year-old cold case that turns out to be the murder of McBride's mother. She tells McBride she really wants to help him solve it, but he says he has investigated every angle. Erin is certain that more modern DNA testing methods could be the key. She is right, but the DNA evidence implicates McBride's father, who left the home when McBride was very young. McBride then tells Erin that's why he stopped investigating the case...because he was afraid that his father might have done it, and he didn't want to be thought of as a murderer's son.
109	20	"Payback"	Alex Chapple	Lauren Gautier & Kevin Wade	April 10, 2015	520	10.31
Danny and Maria investigate the murder of a chef known for winning a reality show, but who was struggling to get his new restaurant opened. They visit the owner of the restaurant property, Lech Choinski, a powerful and well-connected real estate developer, and his assistant, Milena. Choinski confirms the deceased chef was behind a half-million dollars on his payments, and points the detectives toward a young man whom Choinski labels as a "troubled" former employee. The young man, who turns out to be a 16-year-old, confesses to robbery and to killing the chef in self defense, but his story doesn't match the facts of the case and the detectives know he's taking a fall for the real killer. Danny and Maria track down another former employee who went to jail rather than turning on Choinski and get him to wear a wire and visit his former boss. Just as the man is about to be made, Milena brags about killing the chef, saying Choinski's male employees were afraid to do it. Jamie and Eddie find a young woman in the street, stripped to her underwear and nearly blacked out, surrounded by numerous other young people with cell phones. When she comes to, the young woman, Christina, says she was involved in an online game that crosses over into the real world. She says the only person who might have drugged her was a former boyfriend and gamer who got jealous when she changed sides. They interview the young man, who says he was jealous but denies taking it any farther. It becomes a he said/she said case, until Erin convinces Jamie that they can get around the regulations at the young man's college and see if he's had any trouble. With Erin's help, Jamie learns the guy was disciplined twice for stalking former girlfriends, and now he and Eddie must race to keep Christina safe. Elsewhere, a traffic stop for suspicion of DUI involving a female driver becomes complicated when State Senator Ted McCreary is revealed to be a passenger in the car and gives the officer a card with Frank's name and number on it. McCreary is an old friend of Frank's who helped him ascend to the position of Commissioner. Over a meal, McCreary tells Frank the driver was his chief-of-staff, Jess Weinstein. Frank tells the married Senator that the arresting officer proclaimed "off the record" that the two were having a lovers' quarrel in the car. McCreary pleads for a way to bury the arrest and save his reputation, but Frank is more worried about giving the arresting officer the impression that the P.C. can be bought.
110	21	"New Rules"	John Behring	Ian Biederman	April 24, 2015	521	10.00
Shortly after Frank awards longtime friend Deputy Chief Donald Kent (Dennis Haysbert), commander of the NYPD gang division, with his second star, Kent and his wife are shot and killed in a likely gang hit. Frank personally assigns Danny to the case, but impresses upon his son that everything must be done by the book in honor of Chief Kent. Danny believes he can get information from Hector, who witnessed the hit and is in the hospital with a stray bullet wound, but Hector fears the gangs and doesn't want to cause any trouble. Danny also finds evidence that Warrior Kings gang leader Mario Hunt was in the area where the hit took place and he brings him in, but Erin frustrates Danny by saying there is no direct evidence to hold Hunt. Meanwhile, Jamie encounters Curtis, a young man who works as an orderly at Linda's hospital, hanging around an area known for Warrior Kings activity. Curtis assures Jamie he is just passing through, but Curtis' mother, a nurse, confides in Linda that she is afraid that Curtis is being recruited into the gang. Danny finally gets information from Hector that Hunt ordered the hit, but as he had to let Hunt go, he is now in hiding. Danny and Maria meet with Hunt's old boss, Clinton Wallace, who is serving a life sentence in Rikers. While the boss won't give up where Hunt may be hiding, he does hint to Danny and Maria that their witness may be in trouble. As Danny and Maria race back to the hospital, it appears they will be too late. Curtis wheels a cart into Hector's room and pulls a gun from it. Linda is treating Hector, and she instinctively steps in front to protect her patient. As the screen goes black, several gunshots ring out.
111	22	"The Art of War"	David M. Barrett	Brian Burns	May 1, 2015	522	11.28
It is revealed that Hector was shot by Curtis. The officer supposed to be guarding Hector's room has not returned from his break. Curtis gets away as Linda and a team of doctors and nurses try to save Hector's life but they are unsuccessful. The staff then notices that an exhausted Linda has blood covering her right side, having also been hit by a bullet. Linda falls to the floor, and Danny arrives in time to see her being wheeled off to surgery. As this is now personal, Danny rails on Frank and Erin for letting Hunt go. Frank pulls Danny aside and shares a story with him about Chief Kent. He says Kent was successful in cleaning up gang activity not just because he made arrests, but because he also obtained solid evidence to assure convictions. He implores Danny that there is a way to convict Hunt using proper methods. Danny interviews Curtis, and finds the gang threatened to harm Curtis' mother, Faith, before the shooting. Curtis won't testify against Hunt, for fear of Faith being harmed. Frank visits Faith in the hospital chapel, and convinces her to do the right thing. As Curtis is interviewed again, Faith is brought in, beaten and scarred. Angered, Curtis finally gives up Hunt, but now the team must find him. (Danny then reveals that Faith's wounds were just makeup.) Frank looks through Kent's belongings, and finds the Indian book Arthasasthra, which has the theme "the enemy of my enemy is my friend." Danny and Maria arrest numerous members of a rival gang for curfew breaking, and accuse their leader Victor Perez of putting the hit on Kent. Perez of course denies the charges, but eventually gives up a person who would know where Mario Hunt is hiding: Hunt's girl, Regina. With the use of intelligence received from wiretapping Regina's phone (legally), the detectives coax Hunt out of hiding and make an arrest. Frank then visits Warrior King's ringleader Clinton Wallace at the Rikers Island Detention Facility and arrests Wallace for conspiracy to murder the Kent couple and Hector, as well as the attempted murder of Linda. Wallace laughs at the charges as he is already serving life, but Frank then drops a bomb...Chief Kent took an oath with the Federal Marshals, meaning Wallace conspired to kill a Federal agent. And while New York does not have a death penalty, the Feds do. Then Frank mentions that Wallace will be transferred to the federal correctional complex in Terre Haute, Indiana to await trial for the murder of Chief Donald Kent as a federal officer, and Frank will see Wallace at the execution chamber in Terre Haute. Later, the Reagans meet for their Sunday dinner, with Danny and Linda absent as she is still recovering from her wound in the hospital. The couple is then brought to the table via speakerphone, and the entire family says grace together.

== Ratings ==
No.	Episode	Air date	18-49 rating	Viewers (millions)	Weekly rank	Live+7 18-49	Live+7 viewers (millions)
1	"Partners"	September 26, 2014	1.2	10.88	#19	2.1	14.66
2	"Forgive and Forget"	October 3, 2014	1.2	10.85	#15	2.0	14.32
3	"Burning Bridges"	October 10, 2014	1.3	11.09	#13	N/A	14.24
4	"Excessive Force"	October 17, 2014	1.2	10.70	#18	2.0	14.58
5	"Loose Lips"	October 24, 2014	1.3	11.42	#15	2.1	15.25
6	"Most Wanted"	October 31, 2014	1.1	11.39	#11	2.0	15.54
7	"Shoot the Messenger"	November 7, 2014	1.3	11.51	#9	N/A	15.36
8	"Power of the Press"	November 21, 2014	1.3	11.62	#8	2.1	15.38
9	"Under the Gun"	December 12, 2014	1.2	11.09	#7	2.0	14.94
10	"Sins of the Father"	January 2, 2015	1.4	11.61	#4	2.1	15.07
11	"Baggage"	January 9, 2015	1.4	12.86	#7	2.1	16.43
12	"Home Sweet Home"	January 16, 2015	1.4	12.61	#4	2.2	16.57
13	"Love Stories"	January 30, 2015	1.3	11.87	#6	2.1	15.92
14	"The Poor Door"	February 6, 2015	1.3	11.32	#7	N/A	15.12
15	"Power Players"	February 13, 2015	1.3	11.46	#6	N/A	15.40
16	"In the Box"	February 20, 2015	1.5	11.60	#11	N/A	15.14
17	"Occupational Hazard"	March 6, 2015	1.4	11.03	#6	2.1	15.08
18	"Bad Company"	March 13, 2015	1.4	11.07	#9	2.3	15.13
19	"Through the Looking Glass"	April 3, 2015	1.3	10.70	#5	2.1	14.66
20	"Payback"	April 10, 2015	1.2	10.31	#11	1.9	14.10
21	"New Rules"	April 24, 2015	1.0	10.00	#12	1.9	14.36
22	"The Art of War"	May 1, 2015	1.3	11.28	#5		15.06
