= List of Dharma & Greg episodes =

Dharma & Greg is an American television sitcom that aired from September 24, 1997, to April 30, 2002.

It stars Jenna Elfman and Thomas Gibson as Dharma and Greg Montgomery, a couple who got married on their first date despite being complete opposites. The series is co-produced by Chuck Lorre Productions, More-Medavoy Productions and 4 to 6 Foot Productions in association with 20th Century Fox Television for ABC. The show's theme song was written and performed by composer Dennis C. Brown. During the course of the series, 119 episodes of Dharma & Greg aired over five seasons.

== Series overview ==
Season	Episodes	Originally released	
Season	Episodes	First released	Last released
1	23	September 24, 1997	May 20, 1998
2	24	September 23, 1998	May 26, 1999
3	24	September 21, 1999	May 16, 2000
4	24	October 10, 2000	May 22, 2001
5	24	September 25, 2001	April 30, 2002

== Episodes ==
=== Season 1 (1997–98) ===
No. overall	No. in season	Title	Directed by	Written by	Original release date	Prod. code	Viewers (millions)
1	1	"Pilot"	James Burrows	Dottie Dartland & Chuck Lorre	September 24, 1997	AE79	16.09
When Greg sees Dharma on the subway, they can't stop looking at each other. She recognizes his picture in the newspaper and finds him in his office, drags him to a Giants baseball game, then for pie in Reno, where they get married all within the same day. Back at home, the dream soon turns into a nightmare for Greg when he meets Dharma's hippie parents. They can't tell her dad Larry that they committed the 'fascist state's unnatural' act of marriage. Dharma's adventure begins when she meets Greg's socialite snob parents. The happy couple finds themselves in a tug of war between decency and staying true to yourself with ruthless honesty.
2	2	"And the In-Laws Meet"	Will Mackenzie	Dottie Dartland & Chuck Lorre	October 1, 1997	AE01	14.04
When Dharma and Greg throw a party to celebrate their union, a disapproving Kitty boycotts the event, and Dharma sets out to befriend her mother-in-law. But when the Montgomerys and the Finkelsteins finally get together to plan the details, the hostilities really begin.
3	3	"Shower the People You Love With Love"	Will Mackenzie	Bill Prady	October 8, 1997	AE02	14.87
Dharma tries to sprinkle a little TLC in Greg's life by installing a new, deluxe "Spring Mist 3000" shower, while Greg finds himself on a testosterone-ridden golfing afternoon with Edward and Larry. Meanwhile, Kitty, misunderstanding the word "shower," readies for a social event with hors d'oeuvres and formal invitations.
4	4	"And Then There's the Wedding"	Will Mackenzie	Regina Stewart	October 15, 1997	AE03	15.50
There's love amid the ruins when Dharma and Greg hold a "do-over" wedding to appease their families, particularly the hostile Kitty, who turns the young couple's plans for a simple party into a big country-club affair, including a formal renewal of the wedding vows. Meanwhile, Pete and Jane have a surprising encounter of their own in the cloakroom.
5	5	"The Ex-Files"	Tom Moore	Eric Zicklin	October 22, 1997	AE04	14.12
When Greg's former co-worker and ex-girlfriend Barbara is transferred back to his firm from Washington, Dharma seeks to assuage her own natural jealousy by finding a new Mr. Right for Barbara — a quest which takes on a desperate edge when Barbara confesses she is still in love with Greg.
6	6	"Yoga and Boo, Boo"	Gail Mancuso	Regina Stewart & Eric Zicklin	October 29, 1997	AE07	15.01
When Greg's competitive nature becomes destructive, Dharma exposes him to yoga, hoping to lower his stress level. After two classes, however, they both realize Greg's life is out of control when he gets into a macho "I can do this" contest with Pete and pulls a groin muscle. Meanwhile, Larry goes to Edward with a scheme to mass-market videos of Dharma's yoga instruction.
7	7	"Indian Summer"	Philip Charles MacKenzie	Story by : Dottie Dartland; Teleplay by : Don Foster & Charles Harper Yates	November 5, 1997	AE06	14.87
While sunning on the roof, Dharma & Jane meet an elderly Native American who wants to die on the premises, claiming that it was his ancestors' sacred burial ground. Naturally Dharma invites him to stay with her, and naturally Greg is deeply suspicious of his motives and tails them — even to the extent of getting Pete to impersonate him at a dinner with Attorney General Janet Reno.
8	8	"Mr. Montgomery Goes to Washington"	Philip Charles MacKenzie	Story by : Chuck Lorre; Teleplay by : Bill Prady & Regina Stewart	November 12, 1997	AE05	14.42
After Greg wins a major court case, he is urged to run for Congress. It is an idea that moves Dharma to consult Greg's mother for grooming advice, as a potential political wife. After worrying about Dharma fitting in with the political crowd, Greg embarrasses himself during his first public appearance by emerging from the washroom with his fly undone. But when Dharma tries to boost his confidence with a little back-seat lovin', it becomes front-page news. Greg is thrown into a black depression until he realizes that his popularity has soared; then his opponent makes a decisive sexual confession of his own that ends Greg's campaign.
9	9	"He Ain't Heavy, He's My Father"	Gail Mancuso	Bill Prady & Sid Youngers	November 19, 1997	AE09	14.88
When Greg needs an upgraded security clearance to work on a top-secret case, Dharma and the families are subjected to a background check, which reveals some very interesting information about Larry and Edward. Dharma discovers to her horror that her proud anti-establishment rebel father is not in fact wanted by the FBI as he's always bragged, and embroils Greg and Pete in a scheme to plant a phony file for Larry to steal. Meanwhile, Greg is shaken to discover that Edward never in fact divorced his first wife; and Kitty's reaction to the news is not what anyone would expect.
10	10	"The First Thanksgiving"	Gail Mancuso	Chuck Lorre & Dottie Dartland	November 26, 1997	AE08	13.51
After Dharma, Larry and Abby give a farm-full of turkeys their freedom, Dharma volunteers to make Thanksgiving dinner for the whole family in Kitty's spacious kitchen, with Jane's help (while Kitty plays it safe with a restaurant reservation). But Greg is not offering up thanks when he's the last to know that Dharma might have more than just a bird in the oven.
11	11	"Instant Dharma"	Gail Mancuso	Story by : Chuck Lorre; Teleplay by : Sid Youngers	December 10, 1997	AE10	16.69
Dharma's parents arrive for their weekly yoga class only to find Dharma in tears because all her other students have deserted her for the popular self-defense class across the hall. Greg's efforts to cheer her up only get them evicted from Kitty's operatic fund raising evening. Clearing out her locker, Dharma curiously wanders into the self-defense class that turns out to be run by a wacky woman named Spyder, who is promoting herself with alarmist flyers about a massive increase in crime in the neighborhood. When Dharma protests that this is a lie, Spyder intimidates her physically, then invades a depressed Dharma's nightmare about breaking her non-violent principles and retaliating. When Dharma does attempt to remonstrate with Spyder, both she and Greg get their butts kicked.
12	12	"Haus Arrest"	Gail Mancuso	Dottie Dartland & Regina Stewart	December 17, 1997	AE11	15.55
Dharma's free spirit and maternal instincts are challenged when Greg's rebellious teenage cousin Jennifer visits for the holidays and soon abuses her newfound friendship with her aunt. When Dharma discovers that Jennifer has invited a boyfriend over unannounced, she lowers the disciplinary boom — and Jennifer runs away. As punishment, Dharma and Jane take her along on a wacky shopping trip pretending to be monolingual German tourists. They are upset to discover that she has used them as a cover for actual shoplifting.
13	13	"Do You Want Fries With That?"	Ellen Gittelsohn	Chuck Lorre & Charles Harper Yates	January 7, 1998	AE12	17.51
Greg's latest legal victory leaves him depressed in the middle of the office celebration, so Dharma suggests that maybe Greg should quit and "follow his bliss." It turns out that Greg's suppressed passion is for cooking, so he informs his disturbed parents that he is starting a new career as a short-order cook in a hamburger joint. This prompts Edward to confession his own secret talent: hairdressing.
14	14	"Old Yeller"	Gail Mancuso	Story by : Don Foster; Teleplay by : Bill Prady & Eric Zicklin	January 21, 1998	AE13	15.30
Transportation becomes an issue for the young couple when Greg insists Dharma can use his car any time she wants but makes compulsive demands on her treatment of the vehicle. (Dharma: "Honey, I love you, but bite me!") So Dharma goes to a city auction with Jane and Larry and becomes the proud owner of a 1968 yellow school bus. Meanwhile, Abby invites the Montgomerys over for a meat dinner, and reveals that she was once romantically involved with Salazar, the featured artist at Kitty's charity exhibition. An amused Edward challenges the Finkelsteins to attend the function, which is threatened by a freak rainstorm and flood -- it's 'Old Yeller' to the rescue!
15	15	"The Second Coming of Leonard"	Gail Mancuso	Dottie Dartland & Eric Zicklin	February 4, 1998	AE16	14.18
When Dharma's charismatic old boyfriend, Leonard, suddenly re-enters her life after a year in India, Greg finds himself extremely uncomfortable around him, especially when it becomes clear that absolutely everyone else, from Greg's parents to even Marlene, absolutely adores Leonard. Weakened by battling a bad cold, Greg is thrown for a loop when Leonard reveals that he has been celibate since he left Dharma and Dharma decides that she and Greg should give abstinence a try as well. Finally, Dharma informs everyone that they should respect Greg's wishes and not see Leonard any more; then everyone simultaneously spots Greg on television enjoying Leonard's company and his bench-side basketball tickets.
16	16	"Dharma and Greg's First Romantic Valentine's Day Weekend"	Gil Junger	Story by : Chuck Lorre; Teleplay by : Bill Prady & Regina Stewart	February 11, 1998	AE14	12.40
A romantic Valentine's Day weekend turns out to be anything but for Dharma and Greg. It all begins when Greg downloads a travel brochure promising a cozy getaway at the Red Rose Inn in upstate snow country. Unfortunately, things don't go quite as planned. En route, they get ticketed for speeding when Greg tries to make up time lost burying a dead animal that Dharma spotted by the roadside. Worse still, when they arrive at the inn they discover it's just an ordinary little house with no snow and only a backyard trailer to accommodate guests. Meanwhile, Kitty misinterprets Larry's talk about an animal-shelter swap meet to mean wife swapping, and she and Edward find themselves strangely disturbed by the idea.
17	17	"The Official Dharma & Greg Episode of the 1998 Winter Olympics"	James Burrows	Story by : Dottie Dartland; Teleplay by : Chuck Lorre & Bill Prady	February 25, 1998	AE15	13.19
While Dharma, Abby and Jane try to help a depressed Kitty struggle through her 50th birthday, Greg, Larry and Edward head off to the slopes to stage their own Winter Olympics. To head off Kitty's stated intention of immediate plastic surgery, the daffy trio persuades her to join them, big wigs and scanty dresses donned, on a mission to flirt at a navy bar. Kitty is an immediate hit - until one of the young men tells her she reminds him of his mother! Meanwhile, tobogganing down a mountainside in a canoe, at night, backwards, turns out to be the father and son bonding experience Greg and Edward never found time for.
18	18	"Daughter of the Bride of Finkelstein"	Gail Mancuso	Chuck Lorre & Fred Greenlee	March 4, 1998	AE17	13.80
A plumbing emergency in their apartment forces Dharma and Greg to move in temporarily with his parents, and a situation fraught with tension is made worse when the Finkelsteins decide to contemplate marriage after twenty eight years of unwed bliss.
19	19	"Dharma's Tangled Web"	Ken Levine	Bill Prady & Regina Stewart	March 11, 1998	AE18	16.52
Dropping in on Kitty, Dharma instantly senses what has happened: Kitty and Edward are separating. An appalled Kitty makes Dharma promise not to tell Greg, but this well-meaning deception snowballs as Dharma's sense of guilt develops into a series of escalating fibs that draws in an uncomprehending Jane Seymour.
20	20	"The Cat's Out of the Bag"	Gail Mancuso	Dottie Dartland & Fred Greenlee	April 1, 1998	1ABD19	14.00
The pretense that everything is fine with Greg's parents finally proves too much for Dharma, who snaps during dinner at a Chinese restaurant and has the bad news served to Greg in a fortune cookie. Trying to help the Montgomerys' non-existent sex life, Dharma takes Kitty to her local neighborhood erotica store, where they naturally run into Abby and Larry. Greg and Pete take Edward for a drink to commiserate, and Edward demonstrates his ace in pick-up lines. He ends up robbed and tied to a bed by the woman and her accomplice, Vincent (Penn Jillette). Meanwhile, Jane has gone off to a Star Trek convention, leaving her pet Mr. Boots with Dharma and Greg. But Greg freaks out when he discovers that Mr. Boots is not exactly a cat. Guest stars: Penn & Teller
21	21	"Spring Forward, Fall Down"	Gail Mancuso	Chuck Lorre & Bill Prady	April 29, 1998	1ABD20	12.94
Spring fever hits klutzy Dharma, moving her to dance naked on the roof in full view of a newscast helicopter, carpet the apartment with live grass and enter a ballroom dancing contest at the Montgomerys' posh country club. Reluctant Greg insists they should accept that they have no chance of winning and merely enjoy themselves, but Dharma confesses to her parents that for once in her life, she'd like to be competitive at all costs. Trouble is, the brunt of her aspirations is borne not by her competition but by Greg.
22	22	"Much Ado During Nothing"	Ken Levine	Eric Zicklin & Chuck Lorre	May 13, 1998	1ABD22	11.41
When Jane breezes in to claim custody of Dharma's stuffed duck, Dharma explains to Greg that it's a trophy held by whoever has had sex in the unlikeliest place. Having actually fallen asleep during sex the night before, the couple decide to spice up their love life and search the city for a public place to have sex, since the rest of San Francisco will be too busy watching the finale of Seinfeld to notice. But Jane 'seduces' Pete by painting his toenails and shaving his legs, and talks about their plans and sets out to sabotage their trophy win. After a few ironic twists, it is not Dharma and Greg who get arrested for having sex on the steps of City Hall, but Kitty and Edward.
23	23	"Invasion of the Buddy Snatcher"	Gail Mancuso	Susannah Hardaway & Charles Harper Yates	May 20, 1998	1ABD21	10.98
When Greg hosts a poker game, Dharma takes advantage of the occasion to meet his buddies. Petty jealousies surface as she begins befriending the men and privately advising them on personal matters - including bankruptcy, impotence, and a serious crush one of the men has on Greg - and they in turn begin to feel uncomfortable around Greg because he won't share his feelings with them. Upset that Dharma has taken over his friends, Greg tries to bluff her by maintaining that he has plans of his own to hang out with Jane. When Dharma thinks this an "awesome" idea, he finds himself involved in a bizarre role-playing game with Jane's very bizarre friends. Meanwhile, Kitty and Edward are unhappily afloat in "duck soup," as their swimming pool is invaded by waterfowl. Enter Abby, who has a Berkeley degree in ornithological intelligence.

=== Season 2 (1998–99) ===
No. overall	No. in season	Title	Directed by	Written by	Original release date	Prod. code	Viewers (millions)
24	1	"Ringing Up Baby"	Gail Mancuso	Dottie Dartland & Chuck Lorre	September 23, 1998	2ABD01	14.72
When Donna, who works at the supermarket where Dharma and Greg shop, reveals that she has been dumped by her boyfriend just as she is about to have his child, Dharma brings her home for the night. Donna suggests that the couple adopt her baby. Greg is initially against the idea, but eventually agrees to it.
25	2	"It Takes a Village"	Gail Mancuso	Bill Prady & Regina Stewart	September 30, 1998	2ABD02	15.03
Abby and Larry assemble a makeshift "village", which includes an African spiritual adviser, a troubadour, a storyteller who has taken a vow of silence, a lesbian lactation expert and Jane, to help Dharma and Greg with the baby. Greg comes to realize that this entails the village living with them during the baby's formative years. Meanwhile, Kitty takes to her bed at the thought of becoming a grandmother overnight. Dharma promises to help Kitty fulfill her matriarchal ambitions by having "a whole buttload of kids", but is taken aback by Kitty's first decision: to name the baby after Edward's wealthy uncle Fergus.
26	3	"Turn Turn Turn"	Gail Mancuso	Story by : Dottie Dartland & Chuck Lorre; Teleplay by : Bill Prady & Regina Stewart	October 7, 1998	2ABD03	14.57
Dharma wants to determine if her parents can be trusted to babysit by first having them stay in her apartment for the evening without the baby, which she and Greg take to the movies. The theater patrons are initially concerned that the baby will cry, but it is actually Dharma who sobs while watching the sad film. Abby approaches Kitty to see if they can agree on a compromise between the Montgomery's traditional christening ceremony and the Finkelstein's more unusual one. This results in a multi-cultural ceremony in Dharma and Greg's apartment which includes a minister, a rabbi, and a shaman. Even Kitty, with the help of Larry's special cookies, gets into the swing of things. The evening takes a sad turn when a telegram arrives stating that Donna has changed her mind and wants to keep her baby.
27	4	"The Paper Hat Anniversary"	Amanda Bearse	Story by : Chuck Lorre; Teleplay by : Bill Prady & Eric Zicklin	October 14, 1998	2ABD04	15.89
Dharma and Greg stage an argument to escape their respective parents' planned activities so they can get away for the weekend and celebrate their first anniversary. During the drive, however, Greg inadvertently refers to Dharma as "flighty" and she retaliates by calling him a "stick in the mud". To show that he is actually spontaneous, Greg drives recklessly through a field and damages their car. The couple walk several miles to a diner, only to find it is closed due to a death in the owners' family. Greg breaks a pane of glass in the door so they can use the phone, but a local policeman discovers them, which prompts Dharma to tell the officer that they are related to the owners and are there to run the diner in their absence. Dharma takes on the role of a waitress named Tina, and Greg becomes Ike, the short-order cook. All goes well, and the couple make enough money to repay the diner's owners for the broken glass.
28	5	"Unarmed and Dangerous"	Gail Mancuso	Story by : Charles Harper Yates; Teleplay by : Noah Gregoropoulos & Julie Ann Larson	October 21, 1998	2ABD06	14.13
Dharma and Greg receive a call that Pete has been in a car accident. When they arrive at the hospital, they find a partially immobilized Pete, who has dislocated both shoulders. Pete explains that he leaped from the car to avoid a confrontation with his date. Greg is initially opposed to Dharma's suggestion that they nurse Pete back to health at their apartment, but eventually agrees. After an eye-opening visit to Pete's apartment to feed his cat, Dharma commits to helping him heal both physically and spiritually. Meanwhile, Kitty becomes involved in Abby's "Save the Ducks" efforts and convinces her that the only way to raise a large amount of money is to throw an elaborate fund-raising dinner, where a celebrity will be honored. Instead of "Alan Alda or one of the Baldwin boys", as Abby imagines, the only celebrity available is comedian Andrew Dice Clay. As Clay delivers his acceptance speech, the event - which is held at the birds' spawning location - is inundated with ducks, causing everyone to flee.
29	6	"A Closet Full of Hell"	Gil Junger	Story by : Chuck Lorre; Teleplay by : Dottie Dartland & Fred Greenlee	October 28, 1998	2ABD05	15.37
Dharma and Greg discover a hidden doorway in their closet, which takes them to an attic filled with dolls. Greg packs up the dolls so they can be donated to charity, but the next day the dolls are found back in their original positions. This - and the discovery of dolls that resemble the couple - convinces Dharma that they have discovered a portal to hell. Abby attempts to rid the space of the evil spirits, but to no avail. While back in the attic, the couple is frightened by an elderly woman who appears suddenly through a trapdoor. The woman explains that she is their neighbor, the dolls are hers, and the space is actually her attic. In a subplot, Larry makes a table for Kitty and Edward.
30	7	"Valet Girl"	Gail Mancuso	Story by : Chuck Lorre; Teleplay by : Fred Greenlee & Bill Prady	November 4, 1998	2ABD07	15.25
Kitty's maid, Celia, announces she is getting married and invites Dharma and Greg to the wedding. Kitty is hurt that she has not been asked, and Dharma wrangles an invitation out of Celia. When the couple arrive at the church, Celia informs them the valet parker has cancelled. Dharma tells her that she and Greg will act as the valets. One of the wedding guests, Celia's niece Ynez, arrives and recognizes Greg. Greg tells Pete that Ynez - while staying with his parents years earlier - was the first woman he slept with. When Ynez's husband hears of this, Greg must embarrassingly admit to him that he and Ynez did not actually sleep together. Rather, Greg experienced premature ejaculation, which amuses Ynez's husband. Meanwhile, Kitty discovers she knows nothing of Celia's background and tells her she will attempt to be friendlier with her in the future. She and Dharma then drive off in a guest's Ferrari, which Dharma has taken for joy rides rather than parked.
31	8	"Like, Dharma's Totally Got a Date"	J.D. Lobue	Story by : Dottie Dartland; Teleplay by : Regina Stewart & Eric Zicklin	November 11, 1998	2ABD08	15.55
Dharma accepts the invitation of a nerdy delivery boy, Donald, to be his date at a high school dance. While shopping for a dress, Dharma and Jane encounter two of Donald's classmates and talk him up to them. At the dance, Donald's classmates are impressed with his ability to get a date with a woman like Dharma, and he ends up leaving Dharma to be with his peers. Meanwhile, Kitty falls on the floor and injures her backside when Larry inadvertently frightens her while playing his guitar. She sues him for the humiliation of having to sit on a blow-up donut cushion, which made a flatulent sound in front of San Francisco's mayor. A hearing is held at the young couple's apartment, which Pete arbitrates. Kitty is unable to successfully prove that the sound did, in fact, emanate from the pillow and not from her.
32	9	"Brought to You in DharmaVision"	Chuck Lorre	Story by : Chuck Lorre; Teleplay by : Bill Prady & Regina Stewart	November 18, 1998	2ABD09	13.32
Dharma feels she has lost touch with her roots and experiences an identity crisis when she is visited by the spirit of George, an elderly Native American gentleman she knew in life. He cryptically tells her to go to the woods, where she must "save the young one". Dharma retreats to the Redwoods with Jane. At their campsite, Dharma is frightened when she finds a bear cub in her tent. However, she quickly ingratiates herself with him and feels he is the "young one" referred to by George. Meanwhile, Greg enlists Larry to go with him to the woods to find Dharma. While there, they are chased by the cub's mother and eventually come upon Dharma and Jane. The foursome retreat to Larry's van, but he is unable to start it, saying someone must go out and give it a push. Dharma taunts the mother bear, who gives the van the necessary shove.
33	10	"Yes, We Have No Bananas (or Anything Else for That Matter)"	Ellen Gittelsohn	Story by : Regina Stewart; Teleplay by : Charles Harper Yates & Eric Zicklin	November 25, 1998	2ABD10	12.66
Greg is elated when his boss, Mr. Clayborn, gives him a superior rating, but is dismayed to discover that incompetent Pete received the same designation. Despite Greg's attempts to get Clayborn to discriminate between two disparate scenarios (Tahiti vs. Buffalo as a honeymoon destination, freshly baked bread vs. moldy supermarket bread), Clayborn puts Pete in charge when he goes on medical leave. Meanwhile, Dharma rents an empty store without knowing what she wants to sell there. Greg insists she must decide, but she convinces him she is happy to just provide a place where strangers can gather and interact. In a subplot, the couple's parents test run a boat being sold by Larry's friend. While out to sea, a rogue seal lion hops aboard and holds the foursome hostage.
34	11	"The House That Dharma Built"	Gail Mancuso	Chuck Lorre & Bill Prady	December 9, 1998	2ABD11	15.11
Dharma fights to save her childhood home when David Saunders, a greedy developer with whom Greg went to school, pressures her parents to sell it. In an attempt to persuade him to change his mind, she invites Saunders and his discontented wife, Patty, to dinner, only to discover that he is, in fact, as unscrupulous and loathsome as Greg described him. After fighting off Saunders' sexual advances on a trampoline at her parents' home, Dharma solicits Kitty's help in devising a plan to discredit him. She and Jane go to Saunders' home at night to look through his garbage for incriminating evidence. They are soon joined by Greg and Pete. When IRS agents appear suddenly, a drunken Patty emerges from the house, and offers to provide the agents with her husband's shady financial documents, thus saving Larry and Abby's house.
35	12	"Are You Ready for Some Football?"	Gail Mancuso	Story by : Bill Prady; Teleplay by : Fred Greenlee & Eric Zicklin	December 16, 1998	2ABD12	11.50
When Greg convinces Dharma to accompany him and Pete to a football game - despite her lifelong aversion to competitive sports - he is unprepared for her sudden and total conversion into a rabid fan. However, when Dharma sneaks out to a game in the middle of dinner with her parents, Greg realizes she needs help, and arranges an intervention involving San Francisco 49ers' quarterback Steve Young.
36	13	"Death and Violins"	Dottie Dartland	Dottie Dartland & Chuck Lorre	January 6, 1999	2ABD13	17.94
The Montgomerys visit Edward's dying mother, Beatrice. Dharma and Beatrice are the only ones willing to acknowledge the elderly woman's imminent death. While there, Dharma spots a violin - which turns out to be a priceless Stradivarius - and asks Beatrice if she may have it. Beatrice agrees, and Dharma starts practicing, eschewing formal lessons, much to Greg's dismay. Kitty reveals to Dharma that Beatrice has always been hostile to her and refused to give Kitty a family heirloom ring. When the Montgomerys go to visit Beatrice to mend fences, they discover she has died. At the funeral, Dharma removes the ring from Beatrice's hand and gives it to Kitty, saying it was Beatrice's final wish that she have it. As a tribute to Beatrice, Dharma plays an unharmonious version of "Three Blind Mice", the only song she knows. After the funeral - much to Greg's delight - Dharma agrees to lend the violin to her instructor, only to then inform him she now plans to take up the trombone.
37	14	"Dharma and Greg on a Hot Tin Roof"	Gail Mancuso	Dottie Dartland & Regina Stewart	January 20, 1999	2ABD14	14.72
Role playing at a golf shop, the couple put on fake Southern accents and wind up endearing themselves to a genuine Southerner -- who turns out to be the federal judge before whom Greg must argue a cast the next day. After an evening's panic, he decides to tough it out and wins the case hands down (while mystifying Pete). But he discovers he has succeeded only too well: Judge Harper becomes the couple's best friend and constant companion, and Greg despairs at having to keep up the pretence forever -- especially when the judge comes to meet the entire extended family.
38	15	"Dharma and the Horse She Rode In On"	Bob Berlinger	Story by : Regina Stewart; Teleplay by : Julie Ann Larson & Charles Harper Yates	February 3, 1999	2ABD15	16.60
It's Dharma's birthday, but the surprise she gets isn't what Greg was planning. First his parents take them on a mock foxhunt, and the uncontrollably wild stallion at the stables becomes meek as a lamb as soon as he meets Dharma. Groom Joaquin swears it's because the horse has fallen madly in love with Dharma, and sure enough Steve starts showing up unexpectedly at the apartment. Meanwhile, Greg's old flame Barbara is assigned to work with him on a case with an overnight deadline.
39	16	"See Dharma Run"	Bob Berlinger	Story by : Chuck Lorre; Teleplay by : Regina Stewart & Sid Youngers	February 10, 1999	2ABD16	15.28
After a dehumanizing experience with bureaucratic red tape, Dharma is inspired to run for office, and thanks to a pair of wacky opponents and a hefty campaign contribution from Edward, she may have a real shot. Meanwhile, Pete and Jane find a shocking way to fight the alone-on-Valentine's-Day blues.
40	17	"Run, Dharma, Run"	Gail Mancuso	Story by : Dottie Dartland; Teleplay by : Don Foster & Eric Zicklin	February 17, 1999	2ABD17	14.63
As Election Day approaches, Dharma and Greg's relationship hits stormy seas due to clashes over her campaign strategy. Meanwhile, an aggressive opponent may really rain on Dharma's parade.
41	18	"See Dharma Run Amok"	Will Mackenzie	Story by : Dottie Dartland & Chuck Lorre; Teleplay by : Don Foster & Regina Stewart	February 24, 1999	2ABD18	12.12
Election day is here, and Dharma has finally mastered the art of politics. But it's her own body that teaches her that lying can lead to flu, rashes, eye sties, oozing sores and even a bout of the gout.
42	19	"Everybody Must Get Stones"	Will Mackenzie	Bill Prady & Sid Youngers	March 3, 1999	2ABD19	15.87
Dharma and Greg - along with their parents and Pete and Jane - participate in a couples retreat. When they repeatedly fail tests designed to demonstrate the strength of their relationship (which Pete and Jane consistently win), they resort to dishonest measures. While in a time-out, they realize that even though they wed knowing virtually nothing about each other, their relationship is solid. Meanwhile, Kitty and Edward rekindle their romance when they get lost in the woods overnight.
43	20	"Dharma Drags Edward Out of Retirement"	Gail Mancuso	Story by : Chuck Lorre & Bill Prady; Teleplay by : Don Foster & Regina Stewart	March 31, 1999	2ABD20	15.88
When Greg rather reluctantly gives Dharma half of his on-line investment account, she becomes obsessed with profit (even borrowing from her parents), but unwisely follows a tip from a friend of Larry's and sinks everything into a San Francisco company that promptly sinks even further. When she appeals to a recently retired Edward for help, he quickly rejuvenates the business, which happens to merchandize women's fashions for men: edrag.com; but Kitty objects that Edward's golden years were reserved for her.
44	21	"It Never Happened One Night"	Gail Mancuso	Story by : Dottie Dartland & Chuck Lorre; Teleplay by : Julie Ann Larson & Bill Prady	May 5, 1999	2ABD21	11.88
Dharma pushes her mother-in-law's fortitude to the absolute limit when she presents Kitty with an award at a country-club luncheon -- and later wrecks her car. The episode ends with a food fight between Kitty and Dharma. Meanwhile, Greg becomes Pete and Jane's lawyer.
45	22	"Bed, Bath and Beyond"	Gail Mancuso	Story by : Julie Ann Larson & Eric Zicklin; Teleplay by : Fred Greenlee	May 12, 1999	2ABD23	11.38
Greg is forced to go with the flow when Larry makes a few improvements in the loft and lets in more than just a spring shower; and Dick Clark pays a visit during Edward's surreal flashback sequence.
46	23	"A Girl Can Dream, Can't She?"	Amanda Bearse	Story by : Dottie Dartland; Teleplay by : Don Foster & Sid Youngers	May 19, 1999	2ABD22	12.42
Greg discovers he should pay more attention to his wife's intuition when Dharma has a nightmare and begs him not to go away on a business trip.
47	24	"The Dating Game"	Gail Mancuso	Chuck Lorre & Bill Prady	May 26, 1999	2ABD24	13.18
When Dharma and Greg decide to go on a first date to get reacquainted the old-fashioned way, their courtship doesn't go as well as planned: a furious Dharma moves back in with her parents and refuses to speak to a penitent Greg.

=== Season 3 (1999–2000) ===
No. overall	No. in season	Title	Directed by	Written by	Original release date	Prod. code	Viewers (millions)
48	1	"One Flew Over the Lawyer's Desk"	Amanda Bearse	Story by : Chuck Lorre; Teleplay by : Don Foster & Bill Prady	September 21, 1999	3ABD01	16.54
Questioning his place in the universe, Greg begins a journey of self-discovery by exploring his reasons for becoming a lawyer.
49	2	"Welcome to the Hotel Calamari"	Amanda Bearse	Story by : Chuck Lorre & Bill Prady; Teleplay by : Don Foster & Sid Youngers	September 28, 1999	3ABD02	13.31
Trying to find himself, Greg goes on a "journey of self-discovery," which ends in a seedy motel.
50	3	"Dharma's Inferno"	Amanda Bearse	Story by : Michelle Nader & Jonathan Schmock; Teleplay by : Julie Ann Larson & Rachel Sweet	October 5, 1999	3ABD03	16.34
When the financial realities of Greg's unemployment sink in, Dharma takes on a slew of new jobs and makes a deal with the devil to make ends meet: she accepts covert checks from Kitty in exchange for expanded mother/daughter-in-law time spent together. Only when Edward takes Greg to a high-power suits party while Kitty takes her to the opera to see "Faust" does Dharma come to her senses and rush back just in time to prevent Greg from accepting a corporate job.
51	4	"Play Lady Play"	Robert Berlinger	Story by : Chuck Lorre; Teleplay by : Eddie Gorodetsky & Fred Greenlee	October 12, 1999	3ABD04	15.17
Dharma agrees to play drums for a friend's teenage garage band. Meanwhile, she helps Greg through his crisis by purposely invoking arguments with him. Guest Stars: Jane Lynch and Bob Dylan
52	5	"I Did It For You, Kitty"	Robert Berlinger	Story by : Julie Ann Larson & Chuck Lorre; Teleplay by : Jonathan Schmock & Regina Stewart	October 19, 1999	3ABD05	14.95
Faced with Kitty's midlife crisis, Dharma decides to help her fulfill her lifelong dream — winning a beauty pageant.
53	6	"The Very Grateful Dead"	Amanda Bearse	Story by : Bill Prady & Regina Stewart; Teleplay by : Jenna Bruce & Michelle Nader	October 26, 1999	3ABD06	14.60
Dharma becomes convinced that the ghost of a recently deceased neighbor wants to conduct some unfinished business — and the spirit soon moves Greg in a rather carnal way.
54	7	"Fairway to Heaven"	Ken Levine	Story by : Bill Prady & Regina Stewart; Teleplay by : Rachel Sweet & Sid Youngers	November 2, 1999	3ABD07	13.45
Greg decides his life's fulfillment lies on the professional golf course, but Dharma isn't so sure if she should let him play through, given that Greg's journey of self-discovery may mean relocating to Scotland.
55	8	"Tie-Dying The Knot"	Chuck Lorre	Story by : Michelle Nader & Jonathan Schmock; Teleplay by : Don Foster & Eddie Gorodetsky	November 9, 1999	3ABD08	15.35
Abby and Larry decide to make it official after thirty years of unwedded bliss, provided they can get Kenny Loggins to sing at the ceremony. Meanwhile, Greg comes full circle on his search for tranquility when a part-time resident of the local park comes to him with a legal problem.
56	9	"Law and Disorder"	Amanda Bearse	Story by : Regina Stewart; Teleplay by : Jenna Bruce & Chuck Lorre	November 16, 1999	3ABD09	17.50
Constant interference makes Greg wish that his new law practice were a little more private, especially when Dharma keeps solving his client's problems without recourse to the law; Dharma reaches out to her landlady on behalf of the other tenants; Larry pursues an increasingly vindictive feud against his neighbor — who turns out to be his uncle.
57	10	"Thanksgiving Until It Hurts"	Amanda Bearse	Story by : Bill Prady; Teleplay by : Michelle Nader & Sid Youngers	November 23, 1999	3ABD10	18.15
In an attempt to make Thanksgiving more enjoyable than last year's debacle (which we see in flashbacks), Dharma and Greg devise a plan to entirely avoid their families. When it becomes clear how much this has hurt everyone, the pair wind up more stuffed than any turkey after eating four Thanksgiving dinners: their own, one cooked (barely) by Kitty, another with Abby and Larry, and a fourth with Celia's family — who have a fight that tops last year's.
58	11	"Lawyers, Beer and Money"	Asaad Kelada	Story by : Jenna Bruce & Rachel Sweet; Teleplay by : Eddie Gorodetsky & Jonathan Schmock	November 30, 1999	3ABD11	13.42
While his fledgling independent law practice struggles, Greg feels emasculated when Dharma hits the jackpot in a TV commercial whose producers caught her in a late-night promo for Greg's business. Note: This is the only episode of the series to show a blooper reel during the closing credits.
59	12	"Looking for the Goodbars"	J.D. Lobue	Story by : Regina Stewart; Teleplay by : Fred Greenlee & Chuck Lorre	December 14, 1999	3ABD12	12.84
Worried that they've run out of friends, Dharma and Greg "interview" a series of potential couples to see who meets their strict requirements.
60	13	"Drop Dead Gorgeous"	Amanda Bearse	Story by : Chuck Lorre; Teleplay by : Bill Prady & Rachel Sweet	January 11, 2000	3ABD13	19.41
Finding that Greg is overwhelmed with paper work (and that her own efforts to help only lead to desktop carnal encounters), Dharma determines to hire him a first-rate legal secretary. She tries to get pointers from Greg's former secretary Marlene, but discovers that Marlene's only real skill is in dodging work. After submitting applicants to a battery of tests, both skill-related and New Age, Dharma finds the perfect secretary: the intelligent, caring, spiritually centered Kim — who also happens to be a former fashion model. Despite Jane's skepticism, Dharma insists she trusts Greg completely and goes out of her way to throw Kim & Greg together, going so far as to have her accompany Greg to a dance with Kitty and Edward while she goes to a Smothers Brothers vineyard jamboree with Abby and Larry. When the car brakes Kim supposedly had serviced fail, Dharma's trust looks like a fatal mistake...
61	14	"Good Cop, Bad Daughter"	Randy Cordray	Story by : Chuck Lorre; Teleplay by : Regina Stewart & Don Foster	January 25, 2000	3ABD14	20.56
Dharma's friendship with two police officers gets her anti-establishment father Larry hot under the collar, and the family feud threatens to ruin Abby's surprise birthday party.
62	15	"The Trouble with Troubadour"	Asaad Kelada	Story by : Chuck Lorre; Teleplay by : Eddie Gorodetsky & Jonathan Schmock	February 8, 2000	3ABD16	17.49
Dharma lends a helping hand to singer-songwriters Lyle Lovett and k.d. lang when their fame and fortune leave them unfulfilled. Meanwhile, a sarcastic hotel clerk spoils plans for the couple's romantic Valentine's Day getaway.
63	16	"Weekend At Larry's"	J.D. Lobue	Story by : Julie Ann Larson; Teleplay by : Bill Prady & Michelle Nader	February 15, 2000	3ABD15	15.28
While spending the weekend at Dharma's parents' house, Greg fears they're in grave danger when an old family friend shows up unexpectedly — Nunzio and Stinky dig up his skeleton in Larry's garden. Meanwhile, Larry and Abby run into Edward and Kitty on a flight to Washington and discover that Edward is testifying before Congress on an environmental issue that Larry and Abby are protesting.
64	17	"The Spy Who Said He Loved Me"	Amanda Bearse	Story by : Sid Youngers & Rachel Sweet; Teleplay by : Bill Prady & Regina Stewart	February 22, 2000	3ABD17	18.79
Dharma runs into an old boyfriend, Scott, whose endless, high-flown tales of jet-setting sound more and more like flights of fancy. He turns out to be working for the government as a spy. Meanwhile, Greg's hernia becomes a popular topic for discussion and forces several trips to the doctor.
65	18	"A Night to Remember"	Asaad Kelada	Story by : Rachel Sweet; Teleplay by : Don Foster & Sid Youngers	February 29, 2000	3ABD18	17.10
Much to Greg's horror, Dharma tries to help Donald make a memorable evening of his first sexual experience. Meanwhile, Greg searches for memories from his childhood but decides he would rather remain in the present; and Larry develops temporary powers of recollection.
66	19	"The Best Laid Plans"	Will Mackenzie	Story by : Chuck Lorre & Bill Prady; Teleplay by : Regina Stewart & Julie Ann Larson	March 14, 2000	3ABD19	16.94
For the first time in her life, Dharma gets depressed about her sex life when she discovers that Greg can't make a move in the bedroom without checking his day planner first. Meanwhile, a depressed Greg confides in Pete, who convinces him the only logical explanation for the downturn in his sex life is that Dharma is seeing someone else.
67	20	"Talkin' 'Bout My Regeneration"	Will Mackenzie	Story by : Don Foster & Sid Youngers; Teleplay by : Eddie Gorodetsky & Julie Ann Larson	April 4, 2000	3ABD20	16.16
Dharma's ritual of unburdening her sins every seven years reveals things that would be better off remaining a burden. Meanwhile, Larry convinces the Montgomerys' maid, Celia, to go on strike, leading everyone to discover how much control Celia has over Kitty's personality.
68	21	"Big Daddy"	Asaad Kelada	Story by : Don Foster & Eddie Gorodetsky; Teleplay by : Chuck Lorre & Bill Prady	April 11, 2000	3ABD21	18.22
Greg's old girlfriend Stephanie asks for his help in getting her son into Greg's old prep school; and once Dharma sets eyes on the boy, she becomes convinced that he is Greg's child. Larry is building the Gazebo he accidentally burned down.
69	22	"Your Place Or Mine"	J.D. Lobue	Story by : Bill Prady; Teleplay by : Sid Youngers & Jonathan Schmock	May 2, 2000	3ABD22	20.00
After replacing her furniture with Greg's stored bachelor stuff, Dharma is a changed woman. But not necessarily for the better — she becomes strangely possessed with material ambition. Meanwhile, Edward finally rebels against the fact that even his private den is entirely decorated by Kitty.
70	23	"Hell to the Chief"	Steven V. Silver	Regina Stewart & Rachel Sweet	May 9, 2000	3ABD23	14.84
When Abby objects to being president by acclamation yet again of the educational co-op, she impulsively nominates Dharma to run against her, and both women are nonplussed when Dharma is instantly elected. While Abby tries to be supportive, Dharma sets about making changes, which backfire, convincing her that Abby is sabotaging her. Meanwhile, k.d. lang asks Greg for a small legal favor, which quickly goes to Greg's head.
71	24	"Be My Baby"	Asaad Kelada	Story by : Michelle Nader & Julie Ann Larson; Teleplay by : Chuck Lorre & Bill Prady & Regina Stewart	May 16, 2000	3ABD24	17.43
Dharma's vision of a baby sets her and Greg to officially start trying; Pete asks for Greg's help after getting fired; Abby celebrates the onset of menopause.

=== Season 4 (2000–01) ===
No. overall	No. in season	Title	Directed by	Written by	Original release date	Prod. code	Viewers (millions)
72	1	"Mother and Daughter Reunion"	Asaad Kelada	Story by : Chuck Lorre & Bill Prady; Teleplay by : Susan Beavers & Rachel Sweet	October 10, 2000	4ABD02	18.46
In the fourth-season opener, Abby's plans for the new baby rattle Dharma, because Abby's admission that she and Larry made mistakes raising Dharma – like letting Timothy Leary be her babysitter – threatens Dharma's memories of her childhood as idyllic. When Abby's pregnancy is threatened by complications, Dharma feels obscurely responsible, until a visit from the spirit of her dead friend George sets her straight. Meanwhile, Greg's advice helps Pete and Jane make a move to repair their crumbling marriage: they happily announce they are getting divorced.
73	2	"Love, Honor, and Ole!"	Robert Berlinger	Story by : Chuck Lorre & Jenna Bruce; Teleplay by : Bill Prady & Don Foster	October 24, 2000	4ABD01	10.28
Dharma tries to reconnect with her old life by planning a wild road trip to Mexico with her friends. When Greg decides to go along for the ride, Dharma's friends are less than pleased. Meanwhile, Larry lands a job as a night security guard with Edward's company in order to get medical insurance for the baby.
74	3	"Playing the Field"	Gail Mancuso	Story by : Don Foster & Julie Ann Larson; Teleplay by : Sid Youngers & Jenna Bruce	October 31, 2000	4ABD03	10.90
Greg fouls out as part of his wife's New Age softball team, while Dharma learns that Edward's sporting a new lady around town, and it turns out to be an elderly lady at a senior citizens center.
75	4	"Hell No, Greg Can't Go"	J.D. Lobue	Story by : Bob Dolan Smith; Teleplay by : Susan Beavers & Eddie Gorodetsky	November 14, 2000	4ABD05	13.76
A small war breaks out as Dharma stages a protest to halt Greg's plans to enlist in the Army. But once he does, the legal eagle's stuffy style has the troops ready to boot him out of boot camp.
76	5	"Midwife Crisis"	Gail Mancuso	Story by : Chuck Lorre; Teleplay by : Sid Youngers & Rachel Sweet	November 21, 2000	4ABD04	12.23
Abby's labor is a real pain for Dharma when she must share midwife duty with a celebrated author well-versed in childbirth. Meanwhile, Larry's also acting like a brat, after Kitty and Edward present the expectant parents with a new van.
77	6	"Sleepless in San Francisco"	Robert Berlinger	Story by : Susan Beavers & Bob Dolan Smith; Teleplay by : Don Foster & Dava Savel	November 28, 2000	4ABD06	13.23
Abby turns a blind eye when Dharma goes the extra mile to help care for the new baby in the Finklestein family.
78	7	"Mad Secretaries and Englishmen"	Robby Benson	Story by : Bill Prady & Eddie Gorodetsky; Teleplay by : Julie Ann Larson & David Regal	December 5, 2000	4ABD07	11.92
Dharma & Greg's love life suffers because neither of them can keep from helping other people with their love problems, including Greg's crazy, lovesick secretary Marlene. Their romantic getaway gets postponed so Dharma can set Marlene up with Jane's flaky ex.
79	8	"Charma Loves Greb"	Gail Mancuso	Story by : Bill Prady; Teleplay by : Don Foster & Dava Savel	December 12, 2000	4ABD08	12.20
Dharma realizes she should have left well enough alone when Greg's surprise party nearly brings the Finklesteins and Montgomerys to blows.
80	9	"Boxing Dharma"	Robert Berlinger	Story by : Bill Prady; Teleplay by : Rachel Sweet & Julie Ann Larson	December 19, 2000	4ABD12	15.12
Dharma regretfully taps into her hidden anger and a penchant for boxing when a woman challenges her to a barroom brawl. Meanwhile, Larry takes his familial relationship with the boss for granted.
81	10	"Dutch Treat"	Asaad Kelada	Story by : Rachel Sweet; Teleplay by : Bill Prady & Jenna Bruce	January 9, 2001	4ABD13	12.47
When Dharma and Greg disagree about playing role model to their young college friend Donald, they decide to experiment with independence for the first time since their marriage began. When things finally get really tense, only an obscure dream and a visit from Abraham Lincoln can close the divide.
82	11	"The Box"	Asaad Kelada	Story by : Susan Beavers; Teleplay by : Chuck Lorre & Dava Savel	January 16, 2001	4ABD09	11.56
Dharma begins to come unglued when she can't figure out what Greg has locked away in his box of mementos; and Larry makes a big deal out of finding a little something for Abby.
83	12	"Let's Get Fiscal"	J.D. Lobue	Story by : Sid Youngers & Julie Ann Larson; Teleplay by : Chuck Lorre & Bill Prady	January 30, 2001	4ABD10	10.77
Dharma regretfully seeks Edward's business advice when the co-op's slush fund comes up empty, and Greg works with a very successful attorney whom Dharma used to date.
84	13	"Educating Dharma (Part I)"	Chuck Lorre	Story by : Susan Beavers; Teleplay by : Don Foster & Sid Youngers	February 6, 2001	4ABD15	12.40
When Dharma decides to go to college, she meets a professor (Kevin Sorbo) who stirs some feelings that could disrupt her marriage. Meanwhile Greg and Pete try to get an academy student straight.
85	14	"Educating Dharma (Part II)"	J.D. Lobue	Story by : Susan Beavers; Teleplay by : Don Foster & Jenna Bruce	February 13, 2001	4ABD16	12.80
Dharma must come to terms with her own guilt about Charlie, and resolve which direction the relationship will take.
86	15	"Dharma Does Dallas"	Robert Berlinger	Story by : Chuck Lorre; Teleplay by : Bill Prady & Eddie Gorodetsky	February 20, 2001	4ABD17	11.09
Dharma gets to know Greg's dysfunctional cousins and in-laws just in time to keep Edward from making a huge mistake in choosing his successor.
87	16	"Judy and Greg"	Jonathan Schmock	Story by : Sid Youngers; Teleplay by : Chuck Lorre & Eddie Gorodetsky	March 13, 2001	4ABD11	12.27
Fleeing from Kitty's talk on popular restoration of Victoria architecture, Dharma drags Greg into a neighboring high-school reunion for the class of '81, assuming the identities of no-shows Todd and Judy. She is not pleased to discover that everyone present loathes "Judy" for the terrible things she did to them in high school, and decides the universe wants her to make amends by visiting each of Judy's former victims and apologizing. When this doesn't work out, she tracks down the actual Judy for a confrontation. Meanwhile, Larry offers Edward tips on how to revitalize the sexual side of his marriage, and encourages Abby to do the same for Kitty—but their advice ("let the other make the first move") leads to stalemate.
88	17	"Do the Hustle"	Gail Mancuso	Story by : Jenna Bruce; Teleplay by : Chuck Lorre & Sid Youngers	March 27, 2001	4ABD14	13.81
Dharma finds a way to bond with Kitty – and score some cash – after unleashing her mother-in-law's secret skills as a pool player. Greg, meanwhile, races around town to find a replacement rat after killing his wife's beloved house pest.
89	18	"For Pete's Sake"	Asaad Kelada	Story by : Bill Prady; Teleplay by : Susan Beavers & Julie Ann Larson	April 3, 2001	4ABD18	13.01
In an effort to boost Pete's confidence, Dharma makes the naïve mistake of convincing Greg to leave the practice in Pete's very incapable hands while Greg is away on his two-week army reserve duty. Meanwhile Dharma creates a pass-through but it is not easy as she thinks it is.
90	19	"Kitty Dearest"	Joel Murray	Story by : Chuck Lorre; Teleplay by : Bill Prady & Jenna Bruce	April 10, 2001	4ABD19	12.39
Greg loses his cool with Kitty after another one of her annoying charity events, creating a cold front between the stubborn mother and son. While Dharma tries to bring back the love, Kitty goes out and gets herself a better little boy.
91	20	"The Story of K"	Thomas Gibson	Story by : Chuck Lorre; Teleplay by : Bill Prady and Susan Beavers	April 24, 2001	4ABD21	13.11
Kitty's swing at writing erotica leaves Edward exhausted, while her editor (Dharma) finds that the work suffers when the couple plays too much. Meanwhile, Greg avoids the issue entirely by submersing himself into building a model ship.
92	21	"Pride and Prejudice"	J.D. Lobue	Story by : Tor Alexander Valenza; Teleplay by : Rachel Sweet & Eddie Gorodetsky	May 1, 2001	4ABD20	11.10
Dharma's paranoia reaches new heights when she discovers her own prejudice against little people. Greg reunites with an old college friend. Larry and Abby try to play bridge with Edward and Kitty.
93	22	"How This Happened"	Jonathan Schmock	Story by : Bill Prady & Rachel Sweet; Teleplay by : Don Foster & Sid Youngers	May 8, 2001	4ABD24	11.35
While converting an abandoned piece of land owned by Edward's company into a community garden, Dharma discovers a cash deposit bag lost decades ago. The bag traces back to a man who was falsely accused of stealing it (Edward Asner) and subsequently fired, setting Dharma on a mission to right a wrong.
94	23	"The End of the Innocence (Part I)"	Ted Lange	Story by : Chuck Lorre & Susan Beavers; Teleplay by : Bill Prady & Rachel Sweet	May 15, 2001	4ABD22	12.12
Dharma drags Greg to a kooky couples counselor after he finds a lost love letter from her old college tutor. But when she refuses to avoid her other man, Greg takes a stand that could cause a parting of ways for the mismatched pair.
95	24	"The End of the Innocence (Part II)"	Joel Murray	Story by : Chuck Lorre & Bill Prady; Teleplay by : Don Foster & Sid Youngers	May 22, 2001	4ABD23	13.52
After catching Dharma with her old college tutor---and failed suitor---Charlie, an enraged Greg moves out. Then the misunderstanding turns into a crisis as they both get caught up in the planning of their mutual friends' impending wedding, compelling Greg to seriously reevaluate his own crazy marriage. But when he finally sees the light, it may be too late.

=== Season 5 (2001–02) ===
No. overall	No. in season	Title	Directed by	Written by	Original release date	Prod. code	Viewers (millions)
96	1	"Intensive Caring"	Robert Berlinger	Story by : Bill Prady; Teleplay by : Don Foster & David Babcock	September 25, 2001	5ABD01	12.08
The fifth season begins in the aftermath of last May's car crash, with both sets of parents arriving at the hospital and Dharma just out of surgery and groggy from anesthesia. The car accident has left Dharma with a fractured hip and temporarily using a wheelchair. Greg, who fared better with just a few minor cuts, mostly feels guilt, and tries to maintain a "structured" approach to Dharma's recovery which, unfortunately for her, doesn't allow for skipping physical therapy appointments in favor of wheelchair-tongue-depressor relay races down the hospital halls. For her part, Abby believes that crystals and chants around her daughter's bed might help. Larry calls it a "healing ceremony."
97	2	"With a Little Help From My Friend"	J.D. Lobue	Story by : Bill Prady; Teleplay by : Rachel Sweet & Susan Beavers	September 25, 2001	5ABD02	12.08
Dharma decides that her accident must be a manifestation of the universe shuffling her cosmic deck of cards so that she can help people — from the hospital, physical therapy, insurance company, etc. — whom she otherwise wouldn't have met. Yet while Dharma loves giving help to others, she's not nearly as fond of accepting it for herself, even when she's in a wheelchair. Meanwhile, Greg deals with an insurance problem — the company has paid them twice by mistake, but won't listen to his attempts to explain. This episode marks the final appearance of former series regular Jane (Shae D'lyn).
98	3	"Papa Was Almost a Rolling Stone"	Joel Murray	Story by : Eddie Gorodetsky; Teleplay by : Don Foster & Sid Youngers	October 2, 2001	5ABD03	8.41
Dharma learns that her dad, Larry, used to sing and play guitar in a band but gave it all up when she was born. Feeling guilty, she tries to convince him to perform again. Meanwhile, Larry and Abby set up some old pirate radio broadcasting equipment in Dharma's living room to give her something to do while she's recuperating. Initially, Greg scoffs at "Radio Dharma," but one on-air debate with a caller later and he's hooked. Meanwhile, Edward's old running suit hits a sour note with Kitty when it is discovered "lost" in a box of Greg's old possessions, and Edward refuses to stop wearing it.
99	4	"Sexual Healing"	Asaad Kelada	Story by : Jamie Gorenberg; Teleplay by : Bill Prady & Don Foster	October 9, 2001	5ABD04	8.54
At the same time that Dharma's doctor gives her permission to resume sexual relations, Greg sees their totaled car for the first time since the accident and learns that the insurance adjuster ruled it a case of reckless driving. Now completely guilt-ridden and overly cautious, Greg's unable to enjoy Dharma's romantic advances. Meanwhile, Edward wants Larry to return the rundown desk chair of his that Kitty attempted to throw out. While at first annoyed by Larry's insistence that they play games for the ownership of the chair, Edward grows to enjoy Larry's company.
100	5	"Without Reservations"	Jonathan Schmock	Story by : Michelle Nader; Teleplay by : Del Shores & Jenna Bruce	October 16, 2001	5ABD05	9.23
Greg doesn't put out a welcome mat when Dharma turns their place into a temporary bed-and-breakfast. Meanwhile Kitty is having a hippo habit crisis.
101	6	"Try to Remember This Kind of September"	Robert Berlinger	Story by : Bill Prady; Teleplay by : David Babcock & Maxine Lapiduss	October 23, 2001	5ABD06	9.48
Dharma finds herself inadvertently trying to compete with a visiting childhood friend. Dharma and September grew up together in a commune, and September has remained loyal to her nonconformist ways, such as preparing a salad with greens that "were growing in the cracks in the sidewalk" and singing songs taught her by Nelson Mandela. Feeling guilty over how much her own life has changed, Dharma decides to get back to basics. First, she simplifies her wardrobe; then she wonders what else she and Greg can do without — like maybe electricity, or at least Greg's beloved television (just before the Super Bowl). But what worries her most is a suspicion that September may have designs on Larry. And she's right — but they're not what she fears.
102	7	"Used Karma"	J.D. Lobue	Story by : David Babcock; Teleplay by : Sid Youngers & Rachel Sweet	October 30, 2001	5ABD07	8.05
When Greg starts to dress and act strangely after driving the used car Dharma recently bought, she worries he's been possessed by the spirit of the car's previous owner, a petty criminal and gambler who met an untimely death. Meanwhile, Edward has Larry set up a security camera at his house to help catch the person (Kitty) who eggs his house every Halloween, but the "trick" is still on him.
103	8	"Home is Where the Art Is"	Ted Lange	Story by : Don Foster; Teleplay by : Sid Youngers & Ed Yeager	November 13, 2001	5ABD08	8.02
An old performance artist friend of Dharma's who convinces her to co-star with him in his latest work: To live "on display" in an art gallery 24 hours a day for a week. Needless to say, Greg's not thrilled with her decision, and father-in-law Larry's moving in with him does not help matters.
104	9	"Wish We Weren't Here"	J.D. Lobue	Story by : Maxine Lapiduss; Teleplay by : Bill Prady & Jenna Bruce	November 20, 2001	5ABD09	8.52
Dharma and Greg plan to spend Thanksgiving in the Bahamas, but bad weather strands them in Indiana. While they are stuck, Dharma helps plan a couple's wedding. Meanwhile, Abby hosts a surprise Thanksgiving at Dharma and Greg's house. Guest Stars: Pat Benatar and Neil Giraldo
105	10	"Dream A Little Dream of Her"	Asaad Kelada	Story by : David Babcock & Rachel Sweet; Teleplay by : Susan Beavers & Del Shores	November 27, 2001	5ABD10	9.57
Dharma tries to learn the identity of Greg's fantasy girl; Greg's truthfulness upsets things at his parents' place. Meanwhile Dharma is trying to plan a surprise trip for Greg, but plans are changed when Kitty and Edward are going.
106	11	"A Fish Tale"	Thomas Gibson	Story by : Ed Yeager; Teleplay by : Rachel Sweet & Jamie Gorenberg	December 4, 2001	5ABD11	8.50
Animal-rights activist Abby bans Greg from the Finkelstein home when she learns he and Edward are going fishing. Meanwhile Larry's mom comes to visit for Harry's birthday and will hell break loose?
107	12	"Previously on Dharma & Greg"	Robert Berlinger	Story by : Bill Brady & Maxine Lapiduss; Teleplay by : David Babcock & Susan Beavers	December 11, 2001	5ABD12	8.11
Is Greg proposing to another woman and Dharma bringing another man home to meet the folks? This landmark flashback episode takes place six months prior to the series pilot and shows Dharma and Greg's lives before they met and married on their first date. Share in Kitty's chagrin as Greg breaks up with his debutante fiancée, and join Larry as he watches Dharma leave a great guy who refuses to get a job.
108	13	"Protecting the Ego-System"	J.D. Lobue	Story by : Bill Prady & David Babcock; Teleplay by : Sid Youngers & Ed Yeager	January 8, 2002	5ABD13	7.71
Kitty brings Dharma to the ground-breaking ceremony of her arch-nemesis Teensy Manhart's new outdoor amphitheater. But Dharma takes a flying leap into the path of the spade in protest when she realizes the theater's intended site is a precious wetland. Abby, Larry and Ed Begley, Jr., a well-known environmental activist, join in her protest.
109	14	"Near-Death of a Salesman"	Joel Murray	Story by : Don Foster & Susan Beavers; Teleplay by : Eddie Gorodetsky & Jenna Bruce	March 5, 2002	5ABD14	7.01
A heart attack scare during Larry's business pitch for his chili causes Edward to reminisce about a simpler time in his life, when he wasn't a high-pressured "captain of industry" merely acquiring and merging other companies. Trying to persuade him to adopt an easier life, Dharma is taken aback when Edward seizes command of a mall sports shoe outlet owned by his company and happily settles in as a crackerjack shoe salesman — until Kitty finds out. Meanwhile, picking up papers that need Edward's signature, Greg gets a taste of what life would be like as his father's business successor; and realizes (as Kitty angrily tells Dharma) that the real reason Edward hasn't retired is because he is waiting for Greg to take his place. Dharma sympathizes with Greg about abandoning the practice he has built up over the past year — but since this seems to consist of crabby Marlene mismanaging the office and Pete "teaching" three gorgeous young women a "course" in sexual harassment, perhaps the transition won't be so hard after all.
110	15	"It's a Bird, It's a Plane, It's ... My Wife"	Robert Berlinger	Story by : Bill Prady & Eddie Gorodetsky; Teleplay by : Susan Beavers & Jamie Gorenberg	March 12, 2002	5ABD15	7.73
Dharma is the inspiration for her nerdy neighbor/admirer's new comic book heroine, the Blonde Tornado, a sexy, crime-fighting superwoman. While Dharma enjoys her newfound stardom, Greg's life whirls out of control after a newspaper photo of a burglary hails her as a real life hero and him as her cowardly sidekick.
111	16	"I Think, Therefore I Am in Trouble"	Chuck Lorre	Story by : Chuck Lorre; Teleplay by : Maxine Lapiduss & Jamie Gorenberg	March 19, 2002	5ABD16	7.95
Supermodel Claudia Schiffer guest stars as Gretchen, a drop-dead gorgeous new lawyer in Greg's office about whom he's having sexual fantasies. Guilt-ridden over his inappropriate thoughts — especially since it's his "four-and-a-half-year anniversary" with Dharma — Greg tries desperately to get Gretchen off his mind, to no avail. Meanwhile Dharma has problems with her replacement yoga teacher who is popular with her students.
112	17	"She's with the Band"	Jonathan Schmock	Story by : Sid Youngers & Ed Yeager; Teleplay by : Del Shores & Eddie Gorodetsky	March 26, 2002	5ABD17	6.83
After suddenly joining a rock band that includes the rebellious teenage daughter of one of Greg's clients, Dharma invites the musicians to live with her and Greg.
113	18	"Mission: Implausible"	Asaad Kelada	Story by : Jamie Gorenberg; Teleplay by : Sid Youngers & David Babcock	April 2, 2002	5ABD18	7.17
A visit from Rick, a younger alumnus from Greg's law school, launches an unsuspecting Greg into the middle of a crazy college game with very specific rules developed by "seriously drunk" law students. Despite Greg's reluctance to engage in a college prank at this stage in his life, Dharma leaves him no choice when she rallies the gang to help him win back his championship title in a relatively amusing parody of Mission: Impossible. Meanwhile, security guard Larry is disturbed when his supervisor Walter points out that he gets special treatment because his daughter is married to the boss's son. When Larry demands Edward rescind all special treatment, Walter obligingly fires Larry.
114	19	"This Diamond Ring"	J.D. Lobue	Story by : Jamie Gorenberg; Teleplay by : Bill Prady & Don Foster	April 2, 2002	5ABD19	8.16
When Dharma discovers that her drivers license has expired, Greg demands that she be a little more responsible — which is when Dharma discovers she has lost the priceless family heirloom diamond ring Kitty gave her. She discovers it on the roof, coated with tar; and when she takes it to a jeweler for cleaning, she learns it is, in fact, just a really good fake, leading to a confrontation with Kitty. Meanwhile, Pete turns to Dharma for help in getting Gretchen to go out with him. Her simple, sound advice works... Soon Gretchen is head-over-heels for Pete — and he can't stand it. Also, we see Marlene as a judgmental book clerk, and learn that Greg has finally fired her.
115	20	"The Tooth Is Out There"	Asaad Kelada	Story by : Jenna Bruce; Teleplay by : Don Foster & Eddie Gorodetsky	April 9, 2002	5ABD20	6.18
Dharma encourages Larry to ask his brother Herb for a loan to buy Larry's favorite conspiracy bookshop; when strange things start to go wrong, Dharma suspects that Herb is plotting to undermine Larry's success. Her efforts to uncover the plot mean she must undergo multiple dental procedures at Herb's office, but seem to be justified when the store mysteriously burns down just before the grand re-opening. Meanwhile, Kitty tries to revitalize her love life by making Edward jealous — claiming that her car attendant keeps leaving red roses on the seat for her.
116	21	"The Parent Trap"	J.D. Lobue	Story by : Maxine Lapiduss; Teleplay by : Susan Beavers & Del Shores	April 16, 2002	5ABD21	6.50
While Kitty prepares to renew her marriage vows, Dharma entertains Marlene's parents who are just like her. Greg is trying to get along with Marlene.
117	22	"Tuesday's Child"	Joel Murray	Story by : David Babcock; Teleplay by : Sid Youngers & Jenna Bruce	April 23, 2002	5ABD22	6.46
A little girl forms an attachment to Dharma and Greg; Kitty is ordered to perform community service.
118	23	"The Mamas and the Papas"	Asaad Kelada	Story by : David Babcock; Teleplay by : Maxine Lapiduss & Ed Yeager	April 30, 2002	5ABD23	6.66
119	24	"The Mamas and the Papas"	J.D. Lobue	Story by : Bill Prady; Teleplay by : Don Foster & Del Shores	April 30, 2002	5ABD24	6.66
In the series finale, Dharma and Greg find themselves once again trying to make peace between their polar opposite parents when an argument breaks out over whether the couple will vacation with the Finkelsteins or the Montgomerys. Dharma tries to appease both sides by arranging for everyone to spend the weekend at the Montgomerys' mountain chalet, but when the usual bickering and insults kick into high gear, it finally sends Dharma and Greg over the edge. Meanwhile, back at the office, Pete is left in charge of a routine SEC inspection, but when the agent turns out to be beautiful and female, he invents wild stories about inside trading. Dharma and Greg get stuck in a snowstorm after leaving the chalet and begin to wonder how their diverse upbringings will affect them as parents.
