= Zicklin (surname) =

Zicklin is a surname. Notable people with the surname include:

- Dottie Zicklin (born 1964), American television writer and producer
- Eric Zicklin (born 1967), American television producer and writer
- Larry Zicklin (born 1970), American economics writer
