= Tattoo You (disambiguation) =

Tattoo You is a 1981 album by the Rolling Stones.

Tattoo You may also refer to:

- "Tattoo You" (Birds of a Feather), a 2014 television episode
- "Tattoo You" (Orange Is the New Black), a 2017 television episode
- "Tattoo You" (Younger), a 2016 television episode
