= Are You There, Chelsea? =

American television sitcom

- Also known as: Are You There, Vodka? It's Me, Chelsea; Chelsea Straight Up
- Genre: Sitcom
- Created by: Dottie Zicklin; Julie Ann Larson
- Based on: Are You There, Vodka? It's Me, Chelsea by Chelsea Handler
- Directed by: Gail Mancuso
- Starring: Laura Prepon; Jake McDorman; Lauren Lapkus; Lenny Clarke; Ali Wong; Mark Povinelli
- Composer: Matter Music
- Country of origin: United States
- Original language: English
- No. of seasons: 1
- No. of episodes: 12

Production
- Executive producers: Chelsea Handler; Dottie Zicklin; Gail Mancuso; Julie Ann Larson; Mike Clements; Tom Brunelle; Tom Werner
- Camera setup: Multi-camera
- Running time: 22 minutes
- Production companies: 4 to 6 Foot Productions; Borderline Amazing Productions; Werner Entertainment; Bonanza Productions; Warner Bros. Television

Original release
- Network: NBC
- Release: January 11 – March 28, 2012

Are You There, Chelsea? (formerly known as Are You There, Vodka? It's Me, Chelsea) is an American television sitcom created by Dottie Zicklin and Julie Ann Larson for NBC. It is based on Chelsea Handler's 2008 best-selling book Are You There, Vodka? It's Me, Chelsea and aired from January 11 to March 28, 2012. The title is a take on Judy Blume's Are You There God? It's Me, Margaret.

On May 11, 2012, NBC cancelled the series after one season.

== Synopsis ==
The sitcom is based on a book written by Chelsea Handler, a book containing comical stories from Handler's early twenties.

== Cast and characters ==
=== Main cast ===
- Laura Prepon as Chelsea Newman
- Jake McDorman as Rick Miller
- Lauren Lapkus as Dee Dee
- Lenny Clarke as Melvin Newman
- Ali Wong as Olivia
- Mark Povinelli as Todd

=== Recurring cast ===
- Chelsea Handler as Sloane Bradley
- Natasha Leggero as Nikki Natoli
- Michaela Rose Haas as Young Chelsea

== Development and production ==
The pilot first appeared on NBC's development slate in November 2010. On January 26, 2011, NBC placed a pilot order. Dottie Zicklin and Julie Ann Larson wrote the pilot with Gail Mancuso set to direct. Chelsea Handler serves as executive producer, along with Tom Werner, Mike Clements and Tom Brunelle.

Casting announcements began in January 2011. First to be cast was Laura Prepon, who plays the lead Chelsea Newman (originally named Chelsea Hanson in the early stages of production). Next to join the series was Angel Laketa Moore, who was cast as Shoniqua, the assistant manager of the sports bar where Chelsea works. Natalie Morales and Lauren Lapkus followed, with Morales playing Ivory, Chelsea's long-time Cuban-American friend, and Lapkus playing Dee Dee, the bubbly woman whom Chelsea and Ivory live with. Jo Koy later joined the series as Mark, a bartender where Chelsea works. Mark Povinelli then joined the show as Todd, a bar back at the sports bar where Chelsea works. Lenny Clarke was the last actor to be cast in the series, he plays Melvin, Chelsea's father, who is a big man with a big personality.

NBC ordered the pilot to series on May 13, 2011, as a midseason entry in the 2011–12 United States network television schedule. The half-hour series was produced by Warner Bros. Television.

On July 3, 2011, it was announced that Morales, Moore, and Koy were dropped from the series due to creative reasons. On August 9, 2011, Jake McDorman was revealed to have upgraded to a series regular replacing Jo Koy's character as the bartender. In the original pilot he played Jonathan, one of Chelsea's love interests. Another change was the show's setting from Los Angeles to New Jersey.

On August 25, 2011, Ali Wong joined the cast as Olivia, Chelsea's best friend since grade school and a fellow cocktail waitress where Chelsea works.

On November 14, 2011, NBC announced Are You There, Chelsea? would premiere on Wednesday, January 11, 2012, at 8:30/7:30c, following Whitney.

== Episodes ==
Every episode of the series was directed by Gail Mancuso.

| No. | Title | Written by | Original release date | Prod. code | U.S. viewers (millions) |
|---|---|---|---|---|---|
| 1 | "Pilot" | Dottie Zicklin & Julie Ann Larson | January 11, 2012 | 2J6551 | 6.18 |
After receiving a D.U.I., Chelsea Newman decides it's time to change her life starting with moving into an apartment closer to her workplace. Chelsea and her best friend Olivia move into the same apartment building as their co-worker Rick. Meanwhile, Chelsea's sister Sloane is due to give birth and is unsure if Chelsea will be there for her.
| 2 | "Sloane's Ex" | Robin Schiff & Brian Gallivan | January 18, 2012 | 2J6555 | 4.21 |
Sloane's old high school boyfriend Matt, shows up at the bar and against Sloane's advice, Chelsea agrees to go on a date with him. Rick tracks down his ex-girlfriend Nikki, only to realize she is now engaged.
| 3 | "Believe" | Regina Stewart | January 25, 2012 | 2J6554 | 3.80 |
Sloane hosts an event with her church group at the sports bar and one of the band members catches Chelsea's eye. But after spending time with him, she realizes he is more of a match for Dee Dee and attempts to set them up. Nikki takes a job at the bar, which Rick enjoys, but her personality rubs everyone else the wrong way.
| 4 | "Strays" | Jeremy Hall | February 1, 2012 | 2J6556 | 4.04 |
Dee Dee, Olivia, and Chelsea attempt to help Nikki look good for her fiance, who is having cold feet. However, things go awry, and Chelsea realizes Nikki may be sticking around for a bit longer. Chelsea tries to find a good home for a stray dog.
| 5 | "The Gynecologist" | Clay Graham | February 8, 2012 | 2J6560 | 3.63 |
Chelsea brings Dee Dee and Nikki along with her on a deep sea fishing trip she was invited to go on. On the trip, Dee Dee hits it off with one of the captains while Chelsea and Nikki attempt to pair off with two of the doctors until they realize that the two guys are more than just colleagues.
| 6 | "How to Succeed in Business Without Really Crying" | Clay Graham & Robin Schiff | February 15, 2012 | 2J6553 | 3.42 |
Chelsea starts dating an overly sensitive marketing executive to help get Olivia a chance at a job at his firm, ultimately deciding to dump him, but can't seem to find a way to do it without hurting Olivia's chances.
| 7 | "Dee Dee's Pillow" | Regina Stewart | February 22, 2012 | 2J6559 | 3.38 |
Chelsea tries to help Dee Dee meet her crush, Mario Lopez, but winds up embarrassing Dee Dee instead. When Dee Dee takes it in stride, Chelsea wonders if Dee Dee will ever show her anger. Chelsea's dad, Melvin, decides it's time for him to start dating again, and he enlists Rick and Todd to be his wingmen.
| 8 | "Those Damn Yankees" | Eric Zicklin | February 29, 2012 | 2J6558 | 3.45 |
Chelsea has to deal with her father hating her minor League baseball playing boyfriend (Wilmer Valderrama) when he gets traded to the Yankees. Rick helps out Nikki's grandma (Estelle Harris)
| 9 | "Fired" | Clay Graham & Robin Schiff | March 7, 2012 | 2J6562 | 3.62 |
When Rick convinces Jerry (Ryan Stiles) to finally make him manager of the sports bar, Chelsea and her co-workers are happy for him, but things quickly dissolve. Nikki tries to get Dee Dee to join in her cleanse to get rid of bad negativity.
| 10 | "The Foodie" | Julie Ann Larson & Dottie Zicklin | March 14, 2012 | 2J6552 | 2.88 |
Chelsea begins dating a handsome chef (Gilles Marini) who courts her with food.
| 11 | "Boots" | Julie Ann Larson & Dottie Zicklin | March 21, 2012 | 2J6557 | 3.47 |
Chelsea finds a pair of boots she wants but can't afford. Rick is determined to win a mixologist contest, but needs a recipe from Chelsea.
| 12 | "Surprise" | Julie Ann Larson & Dottie Zicklin | March 28, 2012 | 2J6561 | 3.08 |
Chelsea's plans to throw a surprise birthday party to Sloane take an interesting turn when Sloane's husband (Mark Valley) phones Chelsea to tell her that he's on his way back home. Rick has some mixed feelings about a dream he had of Chelsea.

== International broadcasts ==
- The series is seen in Canada by Global Television Network, where it is broadcast as a simsub against the NBC telecast in most areas.
- In Australia, the series premiered on the Nine Network on October 11, 2012.
- The series will air in New Zealand on TV2 under the title Chelsea Straight Up.
- The series premiered in El Salvador, Costa Rica, Dominican Republic, Brazil, Chile, Guatemala, Honduras, Mexico, Nicaragua, Peru, Argentina, Uruguay, Ecuador, Colombia, and Venezuela on February 8, 2012, on Warner Channel.
- The series is seen in Germany on ProSieben. The series premiered on March 19, 2013.
- The series is seen in South Africa on MNET Series channel on the DSTV bouquet.
- The series is seen in Poland on Comedy Central Poland.
- The series is seen in Turkey on Dizimax Entertainment.
- The series is seen in Italy on Mya and Italia 2.
- The series is seen in India on Star World India.
- The series is seen in Croatia on Doma TV.

== Reception ==
On Rotten Tomatoes, the series has an aggregate score of 18% based on 5 positive and 23 negative critic reviews. The website's consensus reads: "Based on Chelsea Handler's bestselling autobiography, Are you there, Chelsea? tries hard, but never matches the book's caustic wit."
