= List of Younger episodes =

Younger is an American comedy-drama television series that premiered on March 31, 2015, on TV Land. Based on the Pamela Redmond Satran novel of the same name, the series was created by Darren Star, and stars Sutton Foster in the lead role of Liza Miller, a 40-year-old recently divorced mother who, after finding it difficult to get a job at her age, attempts to pass herself off as a 26-year-old in order to get any job in her pre-mom career to support herself and her college age daughter. Hilary Duff, Debi Mazar, Miriam Shor, Nico Tortorella, Molly Bernard, Peter Hermann, and Charles Michael Davis also star in supporting roles. On April 21, 2015, Younger was renewed for a second season of 12 episodes, which premiered in January 2016. On January 6, 2016, Younger was renewed for a third season of 12 episodes, which aired on September 28, 2016. Younger was renewed for a sixth season on June 4, 2018. On July 24, 2019, TV Land renewed the series for a seventh and final season which premiered on April 15, 2021 on Paramount+ and Hulu with the first 4 episodes available immediately and the rest debuting on a weekly basis.

During the course of the series, 84 episodes of Younger were released, between March 31, 2015, and June 10, 2021.

== Series overview ==
Season	Episodes	Originally released		
Season	Episodes	First released	Last released	Network
1	12	March 31, 2015	June 9, 2015	TV Land
2	12	January 13, 2016	March 23, 2016	TV Land
3	12	September 28, 2016	December 14, 2016	TV Land
4	12	June 28, 2017	September 13, 2017	TV Land
5	12	June 5, 2018	August 28, 2018	TV Land
6	12	June 12, 2019	September 4, 2019	TV Land
7	12	April 15, 2021	June 10, 2021	Paramount+ / Hulu

== Episodes ==
=== Season 1 (2015) ===
No. overall	No. in season	Title	Directed by	Written by	Original release date	U.S. viewers (millions)
1	1	"Pilot"	Darren Star	Darren Star	March 31, 2015	0.50
Finding it difficult to find a job as a 40-year-old divorced mother, Liza Miller decides to reinvent her life with the help of her best friend Maggie after an attractive man in his 20s mistakes her for a 26-year-old at a bar.
2	2	"Liza Sows Her Oates"	Darren Star	Darren Star	March 31, 2015	0.46
Liza pitches an idea to Diana on how to market an older writer to a younger audience. Having doubts over the age difference with Josh, Liza decides to go on a date with someone more "age appropriate". Kelsey attempts to read a new book from Anton Björnberg, an unknown Swedish author.
3	3	"IRL"	Darren Star	Dottie Dartland Zicklin & Eric Zicklin	April 7, 2015	0.51
Liza worries over having sex with Josh for the first time. Kelsey desperately attempts to sign Anton to Empirical Press, while Diana decides to try online dating.
4	4	"The Exes"	Tamra Davis	Rick Singer	April 14, 2015	0.34
After a running into Josh with one of his exes, Liza decides she needs to figure out where the two of them stand. After going out to celebrate the signing of Anton, Kelsey accidentally drinks too much and sends a message to Anton informing him of her attraction to him.
5	5	"Girl Code"	Tamra Davis	Alison Brown	April 21, 2015	0.55
Liza, Kelsey and Lauren spend the night out at Maggie's art gallery, but ditch her before finding out she has been dropped by the gallery. Diana's excited by the arrival of Empirical's handsome and potentially soon-to-be-divorced publisher.
6	6	"Shedonism"	Arlene Sanford	Darren Star Dottie Dartland Zicklin & Eric Zicklin	April 28, 2015	0.65
In an attempt to prove herself to Diana, Liza organizes a book launch party for Diana's demanding and party-loving author friend. Maggie runs into her finally single old crush, only to discover that she's now pregnant, while Kelsey and Anton take their relationship to the next level.
7	7	"Broke and Pantyless"	Peter Lauer	Darren Star	May 5, 2015	0.58
In a desperate attempt to come up with some quick cash for her daughter's tuition payment, Liza begins selling her underwear online, trying not to arouse suspicion from Josh. Kelsey sets boundaries in her relationship with Anton.
8	8	"Sk8"	Peter Lauer	Dottie Dartland Zicklin	May 12, 2015	0.62
Diana tasks Liza with babysitting Charles' children in order to get closer to him at an awards ceremony, unknowingly causing Liza and Charles to grow closer. After Anton's wife accuses Liza of having an affair with him, Kelsey decides it is time to come clean.
9	9	"I'm with Stupid"	Steven Tsuchida	Alison Brown	May 19, 2015	0.50
Liza attempts to incite interest within the book club community over an unpublished author she discovered in the reject pile. Meanwhile, after insulting Josh's intelligence, Liza gets the cold shoulder.
10	10	"The Boy With the Dragon Tattoo"	Steven Tsuchida	Rick Singer	May 26, 2015	0.59
A bed bug scare causes Liza and Maggie to find a place to stay for a few days, forcing Liza into some uncomfortable and illuminating sleeping arrangements. She discovers that the unpublished author she was so excited about plagiarized her novel.
11	11	"Hot Mitzvah"	Tricia Brock	Dottie Dartland Zicklin	June 2, 2015	0.66
Lauren decides to throw a 'Hot Mizvah' which is laced with drugs, and Liza's truth come out. Kelsey grapples with coming clean about her affair to Thad.
12	12	"The Old Ma'am and the C"	Tricia Brock	Darren Star	June 9, 2015	0.65
While reeling from her break-up with Josh, Liza is put in an uncomfortable position when an old colleague of hers threatens to reveal her secret if she doesn't help her steal the profit and loss numbers for Ellen DeGeneres' new book. Meanwhile, Kelsey and Lauren attempt to get to the bottom of Liza and Josh's break-up.

=== Season 2 (2016) ===
No. overall	No. in season	Title	Directed by	Written by	Original release date	U.S. viewers (millions)
13	1	"Tattoo You"	Steven Tsuchida	Darren Star	January 13, 2016	0.54
Liza's daughter Caitlin returns from India and, on a night out with the girls, gets a tattoo – from Josh. After some failed communication attempts, Liza goes to complain to Josh in person and they get back together. Caitlin sees them kissing. Diana chips a tooth at an important dinner.
14	2	"The Mao Function"	Steven Tsuchida	Dottie Dartland Zicklin & Eric Zicklin	January 13, 2016	0.43
Things are not going well in bed for Josh and Liza. Kelsey does not feel appreciated at work and considers accepting an offer from a competitor, but Liza puts in a good word for her with Charles, leading to a promotion for both of them. Caitlin accepts a job working for her father, and moves in with him.
15	3	"Like a Boss"	Peter Lauer	Alison Brown	January 20, 2016	0.57
Liza and Josh decide not to meet with her work friends to protect her cover. Diana asks Liza to help her cheat her fitbit competition. Liza and Kelsey launch their new imprint, but Kelsey is freaked out when the press release is received badly, so Liza helps her.
16	4	"The Jade Crusade"	Peter Lauer	Jessie Cantrell	January 27, 2016	0.57
Kelsey and Liza go all-out to land Jade Winslow (Justine Lupe), a fashion blogger who is bidding out her upcoming tell-all book. Though Jade appears to be way too much to handle, she is perfect for their imprint branding. Things get complicated when Kelsey and Liza learn that Jade once dated Josh and it didn't end well.
17	5	"Jersey, Sure"	Tamra Davis	Terri Minsky	February 3, 2016	0.62
Liza runs into Michelle and Tom, her old neighbors from Jersey, at one of Josh's band performances. During an uncomfortable double date at Michelle and Tom's house, Michelle plants seeds of doubt in Liza, telling her the romance with Josh cannot possibly last. Meanwhile, Jade is already behind her book deadlines and seems not to care, so Kelsey threatens her agent with breach of contract. Jade then starts blowing all of her advance money publicly, posting her escapades on social media, and later tells Kelsey she has no intention of writing anything.
18	6	"Un-Jaded"	Tamra Davis	Rick Singer	February 10, 2016	0.57
With Empirical about to discover that Jade has no intentions of writing a book, threatening to end the imprint brand prematurely, Kelsey and Liza, with help from Lauren, plot to sell the rights to Jade's "non-book" to Kelsey's former co-intern who now works at Achilles Press. Diana seeks to land a deal with Male Feminist author Hugh Shirley (David Wain). Later, Liza asks Maggie if Lauren's officially moved into the apartment.
19	7	"Into the Woods & Out of the Woods"	Todd Biermann	Eliot Glazer	February 17, 2016	0.62
Liza attends a "Bluegrass and Beer" festival in upstate New York at which Josh's band is playing and soon realizes she's not the outdoorsy type. Her time with Josh is also constantly interrupted by phone calls and texts from Charles, who is preparing to be interviewed for the New York Times' "By the Book" section. Elsewhere, Diana seduces Hugh and manages to injure his penis during sex.
20	8	"Beyond Therapy"	Todd Biermann	Grant Sloss	February 24, 2016	0.71
Liza's secret is becoming a problem when Cheryl meets up with her and Kelsey. Kelsey is angry at Thad when he starts flirting with another girl the day before her birthday. In addition, Josh is interviewed for a New York Times article and doesn't mention Liza, which she is okay with but Kelsey and Lauren are not. The fallout causes Josh to break up with Liza. Thad proposes to Kelsey and she accepts.
21	9	"The Good Shepherd"	Andrew Fleming	Darren Star	March 2, 2016	0.64
Liza buys a wool garment at a farmer's market from a handsome sheep herder named Sebastian (Matthew Morrison) and is impressed by his philosophical writings when she reads one of his pamphlets. She gets Sebastian to share a book full of handwritten essays on his bucolic lifestyle and convinces Diana to publish them, but a later meeting with Sebastian scares Liza away.
22	10	"Bad Romance"	Andrew Fleming	Alison Brown	March 9, 2016	0.62
Trying to get over Josh, Liza sleeps with her ex, David, after they get drunk during a dinner with Caitlin. Liza also attends a young professionals mixer, where she meets a girl who works in Thad's office and learns he may be cheating on Kelsey with his assistant. Elsewhere, Lauren is going overboard planning Kelsey's wedding, causing Kelsey to have to "fire" her friend.
23	11	"Secrets & Liza"	Peter Lauer	Dottie Dartland Zicklin & Eric Zicklin	March 16, 2016	0.65
Empirical pulls out all the stops to please its top-selling author, Edward L.L. Moore, including a street costume party to announce the release of his latest fantasy novel. As the team auditions actresses to portray the Princess for the party, Moore sees Liza in the office and insists that she play the part. Liza continues to pressure Thad to tell Kelsey the truth about his affair while Thad tries to get Liza to stay silent but she refuses. A tragic accident occurs.
24	12	"No Weddings & a Funeral"	Peter Lauer	Darren Star	March 23, 2016	0.68
In the aftermath of Thad's death, both Kelsey and Thad's identical twin brother, Chad, want to know why Liza was with him when the accident occurred. Liza tells Kelsey about Thad's cheating, but not that Thad had discovered her secret. An angry Kelsey tells Liza that, if she had minded her own business, Thad wouldn't have been there. This causes Liza to resign from Empirical and take a job at the Paramus (NJ) Mall. Charles goes to see her at the mall and convinces her to return. Charles then kisses her. Walking home from work the next day, Liza finds Josh on her doorstep, proclaiming that he wants her back. They kiss and reunite.

=== Season 3 (2016) ===
No. overall	No. in season	Title	Directed by	Written by	Original release date	U.S. viewers (millions)
25	1	"A Kiss is Just a Kiss"	Steven Tsuchida	Darren Star	September 28, 2016	0.50
Liza drops her daughter Caitlin off at college and meets her roommate and the roommate's parents. Charles invites Liza to dinner who flees when she sees the parents of Caitlin's roommate talking to Charles. Liza then has to help Kelsey who is dealing with a very drunk Diana. Liza later learns that Chad gave Thad's laptop to Kelsey so that she can try to crack Thad's password.
26	2	"The Marshmallow Experiment"	Steven Tsuchida	Dottie Dartland Zicklin & Eric Zicklin	October 5, 2016	0.54
Liza's secret is almost exposed. Her therapist has written a book which mentions an unnamed 40-year-old woman posing as 26. Meanwhile, Liza and Kelsey meet with Bryce Reiger, a 20-something tech billionaire who is interested in investing in Empirical. Bryce invites them to his loft party but drama ensues and Thad's true feelings for Kelsey are revealed. Josh makes it clear that he is 100 percent back in his relationship with Liza, but she is hesitant.
27	3	"Last Days of Books"	Tricia Brock	Alison Brown	October 12, 2016	0.53
Liza's separate worlds almost collide again when she convinces Bryce to make a significant contribution to keep her favorite bookstore in Paramus, NJ (her home town) from closing, and Charles insists that she come along. As the helicopter approaches the spot for the check presentation Liza states that a secret may be revealed about her but Bryce then abruptly decide to back out and as the helicopter returns to Manhattan, she manages to conceal the truth again. Meanwhile, Kelsey goes out with Lauren who is attracted to a man at the bar and sleeps with him.
28	4	"A Night at the Opera"	Tricia Brock	Grant Sloss	October 19, 2016	0.45
Liza and Josh go to a charity event at the opera and see Charles with Radha, a new woman he has met. Diana argues vehemently with a construction crew that is making noise in her building at all hours. She confronts one of the men who then seduces her. Meanwhile, Bryce proposes a book deal with two YouTube sensations known as the "Stoopid Girls". Liza meets one of the girls and discovers she is very intelligent and well-read. She suggests that the girl write a book as herself but Bryce refuses. Bryce then mentions he wants to fire the older employees.
29	5	"P Is for Pancake"	Peter Lauer	Jessie Cantrell	October 26, 2016	0.57
Kelsey meets a great man named Lucas while Maggie meets a woman named Malkie at a community garden and accepts an invite to a gathering at a woman's boutique. Meanwhile, Bryce suggests that Empirical publish digital rewrites of classic novels such as The Great Gatsby with alternate endings which angers Charles, Diana, and Liza. Eventually Charles hints that Bryce is not right for Empirical. Later Liza and Josh attend a party thrown by medical and he asks Liza if she would consider having another child.
30	6	"Me, Myself, and O"	Peter Lauer	Lyle Friedman & Ashley Skidmore	November 2, 2016	0.55
In order to generate needed revenue, Charles tries to convince Edward L.L. Moore to write another novel in the popular Crown of Kings series, but Moore staunchly refuses. At the same time, Empirical chooses to pass on a novel called Me, Myself and O, submitted by unknown author Aubrey Alexis, until Liza realizes from the prose that the book was written by Moore under a pen name. Malkie invites Maggie to a nude bathing experience and Maggie convinces Liza to tag along but, when they arrive, they find it is more of a religious ritual than they thought. Meanwhile, Josh's attempts to have sex with Liza in a public place keep getting shut down.
31	7	"Ladies Who Lust"	Todd Biermann	Lila Feinberg	November 9, 2016	0.55
The mystery of Aubrey Alexis' identity boosts sales of Me, Myself and O. Gwyneth Paltrow offers to read passages of the book at the Ladies Who Lust gathering but backs out leaving Liza to do it. As Liza begins Moore tries to reveal that he is Aubrey Alexis but Kelsey intervenes. Meanwhile, Maggie's relationship with Malkie breaks down after she starts to realize that their relationship includes Malkie's omnipresent Jewish lesbian friends. Elsewhere, Josh is surprised to learn that Liza has only slept with three men in her life while he has been with many women..
32	8	"What's Up, Dock?"	Todd Biermann	Alison Brown	November 16, 2016	0.62
Liza accidentally puts her fake birth date on her divorce papers. Diana meets a man outside her office building who encourages her to ride rental bikes with him. She agrees but later learns he is gay and married whereupon she leaves the bike and asks Liza to retrieve it. Liza does so but is hit by a car and ends up in the hospital. Charles hears about the accident and wants to see her but his date Radha tells him if he goes they are finished. He goes anyway but Liza is in a morphine-induced stupor. Liza wakes briefly and groggily expresses her feelings for Charles but her ex-husband David thinks she's talking to him. Meanwhile, Kelsey is disappointed when she starts to get romantic with Colin and he asks her to read his novel.
33	9	"Summer Friday"	Peter Lauer	Darren Star	November 30, 2016	0.66
Liza reads Colin's novel and thinks they should pursue it. Liza and Kelsey get EW to do a story on Empirical with Colin as the featured author but this backfires. Meanwhile, Josh is disappointed with his and Liza's sex life but she let him give her a tattoo while on advice from her therapist, Diana talks to a man named Richard which causes conflict later.
34	10	"Pigeons, Parrots & Storks"	Peter Lauer	Dottie Dartland Zicklin & Eric Zicklin	December 7, 2016	0.65
Kelsey helps Colin promote his book. Josh tells Liza that he loves her and isn't happy when a pregnancy test turns out to be negative. Liza says she does not want another baby while Josh admits to her that he's been thinking about being a parent. Meanwhile, Richard moves in with Diana and Colin blows off a party to work on his editor's notes for re-writes of his novel.
35	11	"A Book Fair to Remember"	Andrew Fleming	Alison Brown	December 14, 2016	0.60
Liza is shocked by Josh's confession and thinks of ending things with him. She and Kelsey have to attend the book fair in the Hamptons to promote Millennial. Drama ensues after their colleague, Emily, from Entertainment Weekly tries to blackmail Liza's about her real age. She promises to keep Liza's secret if Millennial publishes her book. Meanwhile, Josh and Maggie go for coffee and he admits he doesn't want to lose her. After the book fair, Charles and Liza go to a concert, dance and share a kiss. Josh sees them and walks away. Liza then discovers that he had planned on proposing to her.
36	12	"Get Real"	Dottie Dartland Zicklin	Darren Star & Dottie Dartland Zicklin & Eric Zicklin	December 14, 2016	0.55
Kelsey and Liza come back from the Hamptons book fair where Liza suspects that Josh might have seen her kiss Charles. Meanwhile Colin is offered a contract with Netflix to adapt his book and tells Kelsey he doesn't want to move in together. Antonia Stewart, a self-help guru, is supposed to publish a new book with Empirical but only if Kelsey and Liza attend her seminar. Liza admits to Antonia that she really does love Josh, but when she goes to see him he says he can't take any more of her lying and cheating. She goes home and tells Kelsey the truth about herself.

=== Season 4 (2017) ===
No. overall	No. in season	Title	Directed by	Written by	Original release date	U.S. viewers (millions)
37	1	"Post Truth"	Steven Tsuchida	Darren Star	June 28, 2017	0.80
Kelsey says she needs time to think after Liza's confession. At work, Kelsey insists that Liza keep up the ruse for the sake of their imprint and they find a way to deal with Emily's blackmail. Meanwhile, Kelsey looks for a new place to stay. After striking out on several options, she moves in with Josh.
38	2	"Gettin' Hygge with It"	Steven Tsuchida	Dottie Dartland Zicklin	July 5, 2017	0.66
Kelsey continues to snub Liza while she and Josh bond over their mutual betrayal by her. Colin comes back into Kelsey's life after his publisher messes up his book release, but at a party thrown by Diana, Colin directly solicits Charles with his book idea. Meanwhile, Maggie meets a cute barista who is a big fan of her art.
39	3	"Forged in Fire"	Todd Biermann	Alison Brown	July 12, 2017	0.71
Charles announces that Millennial has been invited to a VIP publishing retreat called Bonfire and then expresses his desire to give Liza a promotion. Liza and Diana have lunch and encounter Richard's ex-wife. Kelsey and Liza argue, and Liza leaves the event. The next day on the way back to New York, Caitlin calls to tell Liza she is in the emergency room. Kelsey finally realizes why Liza had to lie about her age, and the two reconcile. Meanwhile, Maggie meets with Josh and he is introduced to Montana, Maggie's barista friend.
40	4	"In the Pink"	Todd Biermann	Grant Sloss	July 19, 2017	0.67
Charles announces Liza's promotion to associate editor for Millennial. Belinda Lacroix, one of Empirical's most successful romance novelists, suddenly dies, and the staff attends her funeral where a number of other authors and publishers are present. Kelsey is approached by Zane, an editor, who asks her out on a date. Liza and Josh sleep around. Meanwhile, Lauren breaks up with Max because their relationship is dull, and Maggie's assistant decides to resign because she has arranged a show of her own.
41	5	"The Gift of the Maggie"	Brennan Shroff	Ashley Skidmore & Lyle Friedman	July 26, 2017	0.67
Montana asks Josh to help move some canvases to her parents' home. In the studio are paintings by other artists that Montana has painted over with her "mark" (an outline of the state of Montana), including the painting Maggie gave to Montana as a gift. Montana plans to sell all the works at her show and claims that she is no different than rap artists sampling other people's music. Maggie goes to Montana's show and makes her anger known. Meanwhile at Empirical, Liza and Charles try to find an author who will complete the remaining books in Belinda Lacroix's contract, and Kelsey successfully brings Lachlan Flynn on board.
42	6	"A Close Shave"	Brennan Shroff	Don Roos	August 2, 2017	0.74
Liza is blackmailed into publishing Emily's poodle book which surprisingly becomes a big seller for Millennial. Charles now has more money to offer author Edward L.L. Moore but Kelsey's friend Zane manages to steal him anyway. Diana loses romantic interest in Charles and believes she is falling in love with Richard. Liza's daughter Caitlin exposes her secret in front of Jay, the editor from Bonfire, but he vows to keep her secret. Meanwhile, Maggie meets a beautiful woman named Donna in a bar but can't get past one physical feature.
43	7	"Fever Pitch"	Peter Lauer	Joe Murphy	August 9, 2017	0.70
Liza meets an author named Pauline and finds her work promising. After the Edward L.L. Moore crisis, Kelsey heads upstate with Lauren and Josh to relax. Liza and Charles have a conversation about her dinner with Jay, and Liza tells Charles about the promising author she met, only to learn that Pauline is Charles' ex-wife. Josh and Kelsey share a kiss.
44	8	"The Gelato and the Pube"	Peter Lauer	Dottie Dartland Zicklin & Eric Zicklin	August 16, 2017	0.70
Despite the details contained in Pauline's book, Charles thinks Millennial should publish it and asks Liza to be the editor. Liza learns that Pauline is clearly still in love with Charles and hopes to get back together. Charles then has a meeting with Pauline to discuss details in the book while Liza babysits their girls. Josh and Kelsey go to a bar and joke about finding someone better for the other but Liza shows up and sets Josh up with an Irish bartender named Clare. Meanwhile, Diana has to deal with Richard's son living in their apartment.
45	9	"The Incident at Pound Ridge"	Dottie Dartland Zicklin	Dottie Dartland Zicklin & Alison Brown	August 23, 2017	0.76
Josh takes Clare on a date and Kelsey arrives at his apartment and offers him $10,000 to develop an adult coloring book. Liza meets with Pauline who can't concentrate because she's convinced that Charles is seeing someone. Liza's worlds collide at the annual Empirical picnic at Charles' home. Josh arrives with Clare and later punches Charles during a sack race while Charles deduces that Josh saw him and Liza in The Hamptons. Pauline asks Liza to help her find out whom Charles is seeing. Charles asks Liza to stay the night after the picnic is done but Liza declines. Meanwhile, Kelsey tells Liza she should stay away from Charles and meets author Lachlan Flynn's wife who is not happy about Kelsey's professional relationship with him.
46	10	"A Novel Marriage"	Andrew Fleming	Alison Brown	August 30, 2017	0.83
Liza learns that Charles has considered removing her as editor of Pauline's book. Lauren invites Kelsey, Liza, and Pauline to an exclusive women-only club. While at the club, Pauline runs into an old friend named Louise who invites her and Liza to a highbrow party where Liza is almost outed at the party by her daughter's friend's parents. Meanwhile, Diana gives Richard one week to get his son out of their apartment and Josh learns that Clare's work visa expires in a week.
47	11	"It's Love, Actually"	Andrew Fleming	Grant Sloss	September 6, 2017	0.76
Diana and Charles propose that Pauline's book Marriage Vacation be released under the Empirical brand, rather than Millennial, which upsets Kelsey. Zane offers Kelsey a new job founding an independent publishing company but Kelsey eventually rejects his offer. Zane is then hired as a senior editor at Empirical. Meanwhile, Liza deals with Pauline and Charles growing closer, Josh holds a goodbye party for Clare, and Diana learns that Richard has been keeping secrets from her.
48	12	"Irish Goodbye"	Todd Biermann	Darren Star & Don Roos & Joe Murphy	September 13, 2017	0.83
Josh travels to Ireland to marry Clare so she can get a Green card and asks Liza to go with him. Clare asks Liza to support their relationship and insists that Liza owes it to him, while Liza tells Josh she is uncomfortable lying to Homeland Security. Clare's friend exposes the real reason for the marriage, but Liza intervenes. Josh shows up drunk in Liza's room, telling her that he wants to be with her. She lets him spend the night with her. The next morning Josh tells Liza he needs to marry Clare or he'll keep coming back to her when he should be moving on. Meanwhile, at Empirical, Zane wants to promote Pauline's book on TV with joint appearances by Charles and Pauline but Charles says no. Zane then cons Charles into appearing on air.

=== Season 5 (2018) ===
No. overall	No. in season	Title	Directed by	Written by	Original release date	U.S. viewers (millions)
49	1	"#LizaToo"	Steven Tsuchida	Darren Star	June 5, 2018	0.60
50	2	"A Titanic Problem"	Steven Tsuchida	Dottie Dartland Zicklin & Eric Zicklin	June 12, 2018	0.70
51	3	"The End of the Tour"	Peter Lauer	Alison Brown	June 19, 2018	0.64
52	4	"The Talented Mr. Ridley"	Peter Lauer	Grant Sloss	June 26, 2018	0.74
53	5	"Big Little Liza"	Miriam Shor	Ashley Skidmore	July 10, 2018	0.55
54	6	"Sex, Liza and Rock & Roll"	Steven Tsuchida	Joe Murphy	July 17, 2018	0.57
55	7	"A Christmas Miracle"	Peter Lauer	Grant Sloss	July 24, 2018	0.64
56	8	"The Bubble"	Peter Lauer	Dottie Dartland Zicklin & Eric Zicklin	July 31, 2018	0.65
57	9	"Honk if You're Horny"	Todd Biermann	Alison Brown	August 7, 2018	0.79
58	10	"Girls on the Side"	Todd Biermann	Joe Murphy	August 14, 2018	0.74
59	11	"Fraudlein"	Andrew Fleming	Don Roos	August 21, 2018	0.70
60	12	"Lizability"	Andrew Fleming	Darren Star & Grant Sloss	August 28, 2018	0.73

=== Season 6 (2019) ===
No. overall	No. in season	Title	Directed by	Written by	Original release date	U.S. viewers (millions)
61	1	"Big Day"	Steven Tsuchida	Teleplay by : Dottie & Eric Zicklin; Story by : Alison Greenberg & Dottie & Eric Zicklin	June 12, 2019	0.64
62	2	"Flush With Love"	Steven Tsuchida	Don Roos	June 19, 2019	0.58
63	3	"The Unusual Suspect"	Brennan Shroff	Grant Sloss	June 26, 2019	0.53
64	4	"An Inside Glob"	Miriam Shor	Alison Brown	July 10, 2019	0.65
65	5	"Stiff Competition"	Peter Lauer	Joe Murphy	July 17, 2019	0.63
66	6	"Merger, She Wrote"	Peter Lauer	Ashley Skidmore	July 24, 2019	0.50
67	7	"Friends with Benefits"	Todd Biermann	Darren Star	July 31, 2019	0.45
68	8	"The Debu-taunt"	Todd Biermann	Sarah Choi	August 7, 2019	0.61
69	9	"Millennial's Next Top Model"	Jennifer Arnold	Grant Sloss	August 14, 2019	0.55
70	10	"It's All About the Money, Honey"	Jennifer Arnold	Alison Brown	August 21, 2019	0.64
71	11	"Holding Out For A SHero"	Peter Lauer	Joe Murphy	August 28, 2019	0.55
72	12	"Forever"	Peter Lauer	Don Roos	September 4, 2019	0.63

=== Season 7 (2021) ===
No. overall	No. in season	Title	Directed by	Written by	Original release date
73	1	"A Decent Proposal"	Andrew Fleming	Darren Star	April 15, 2021
74	2	"It’s the End of the World, Worm Girl"	Andrew Fleming	Don Roos	April 15, 2021
75	3	"FKA Millennial"	Andrew Fleming	Dottie Dartland Zicklin & Eric Zicklin	April 15, 2021
76	4	"Risky Business"	Andrew Fleming	Alison Brown	April 15, 2021
77	5	"The Last Unicorn"	Jennifer Arnold	Grant Sloss	April 22, 2021
78	6	"The F Word"	Jennifer Arnold	Sarah Choi	April 29, 2021
79	7	"The Son Also Rises"	Jennifer Arnold	Joe Murphy	May 6, 2021
80	8	"The Baroness"	Jennifer Arnold	Don Roos	May 13, 2021
81	9	"Fallout"	Peter Lauer	Alison Brown	May 20, 2021
82	10	"Inku-baited"	Peter Lauer	Grant Sloss	May 27, 2021
83	11	"Make No Mustique"	Peter Lauer	Dottie Dartland Zicklin & Eric Zicklin	June 3, 2021
84	12	"Older"	Peter Lauer	Darren Star	June 10, 2021

== Ratings ==
=== Season 1 ===
Viewership and ratings per episode of List of Younger episodes
No.	Title	Air date	Rating (18–49)	Viewers (millions)
1	"Pilot"	March 31, 2015	0.2	0.50
2	"Liza Sows Her Oates"	March 31, 2015	0.2	0.46
3	"IRL"	April 7, 2015	0.2	0.51
4	"The Exes"	April 14, 2015	0.1	0.34
5	"Girl Code"	April 21, 2015	0.1	0.55
6	"Shedonism"	April 28, 2015	0.2	0.65
7	"Broke and Pantyless"	May 5, 2015	0.2	0.58
8	"Sk8"	May 12, 2015	0.2	0.62
9	"I'm with Stupid"	May 19, 2015	0.2	0.50
10	"The Boy With the Dragon Tattoo"	May 26, 2015	0.2	0.59
11	"Hot Mitzvah"	June 2, 2015	0.2	0.66
12	"The Old Ma'am and the C"	June 9, 2015	0.2	0.65

=== Season 2 ===
Viewership and ratings per episode of List of Younger episodes
No.	Title	Air date	Rating (18–49)	Viewers (millions)
1	"Tattoo You"	January 13, 2016	0.2	0.54
2	"The Mao Function"	January 13, 2016	0.1	0.43
3	"Like a Boss"	January 20, 2016	0.2	0.57
4	"The Jade Crusade"	January 27, 2016	0.2	0.57
5	"Jersey, Sure"	February 3, 2016	0.2	0.62
6	"Un-Jaded"	February 10, 2016	0.2	0.57
7	"Into the Woods & Out of the Woods"	February 17, 2016	0.2	0.62
8	"Beyond Therapy"	February 24, 2016	0.2	0.71
9	"The Good Shepherd"	March 2, 2016	0.2	0.64
10	"Bad Romance"	March 9, 2016	0.2	0.62
11	"Secrets & Liza"	March 16, 2016	0.2	0.65
12	"No Weddings & a Funeral"	March 23, 2016	0.2	0.68

=== Season 3 ===
Viewership and ratings per episode of List of Younger episodes
No.	Title	Air date	Rating (18–49)	Viewers (millions)
1	"A Kiss is Just a Kiss"	September 28, 2016	0.2	0.50
2	"The Marshmallow Experiment"	October 5, 2016	0.2	0.54
3	"Last Days of Books"	October 12, 2016	0.1	0.53
4	"A Night at the Opera"	October 19, 2016	0.1	0.45
5	"P is for Pancake"	October 26, 2016	0.2	0.57
6	"Me, Myself, and O"	November 2, 2016	0.2	0.55
7	"Ladies Who Lust"	November 9, 2016	0.2	0.55
8	"What's Up, Dock?"	November 16, 2016	0.2	0.62
9	"Summer Friday"	November 30, 2016	0.2	0.66
10	"Pigeons, Parrots & Storks"	December 7, 2016	0.2	0.65
11	"A Book Fair to Remember"	December 14, 2016	0.2	0.60
12	"Get Real"	December 14, 2016	0.2	0.55

=== Season 4 ===
Viewership and ratings per episode of List of Younger episodes
No.	Title	Air date	Rating (18–49)	Viewers (millions)
1	"Post Truth"	June 28, 2017	0.3	0.80
2	"Gettin' Hygge with It"	July 5, 2017	0.2	0.66
3	"Forged in Fire"	July 12, 2017	0.2	0.71
4	"In the Pink"	July 19, 2017	0.2	0.67
5	"The Gift of the Maggie"	July 26, 2017	0.2	0.67
6	"A Close Shave"	August 2, 2017	0.2	0.74
7	"Fever Pitch"	August 9, 2017	0.2	0.70
8	"The Gelato and the Pube"	August 16, 2017	0.2	0.70
9	"The Incident at Pound Ridge"	August 23, 2017	0.2	0.76
10	"A Novel Marriage"	August 30, 2017	0.3	0.83
11	"It's Love, Actually"	September 6, 2017	0.2	0.76
12	"Irish Goodbye"	September 13, 2017	0.3	0.83

=== Summary ===
Younger : U.S. viewers per episode (thousands)

Season	Episode number											
Season	1	2	3	4	5	6	7	8	9	10	11	12
1	500	460	510	340	550	650	580	620	500	590	660	650
2	540	430	570	570	620	570	620	710	640	620	650	680
3	500	540	530	450	570	550	550	620	660	650	600	550
4	800	660	710	670	670	740	700	700	760	830	760	830
5	600	700	640	740	550	570	640	650	790	740	700	730
6	640	580	530	650	630	500	450	610	550	640	550	630

Audience measurement performed by Nielsen Media Research
