= Lizability =

- Younger episode
- Episode no.: Season 5 Episode 12
- Directed by: Andrew Fleming
- Written by: Darren Star; Grant Sloss
- Cinematography by: John A. Thomas
- Editing by: Alex Minnick
- Original air date: August 28, 2018
- Running time: 31 minutes

Guest appearances
- Laura Benanti as Quinn Tyler; Phoebe Dynevor as Clare; Martha Plimpton as Cheryl Sussman; Chris Tardio as Enzo De Luca

Episode chronology
← Previous "Fraudlein"	Next → "Big Day"
- Younger (season 5)

"Lizability" is the twelfth and final episode of the fifth season and the sixtieth episode overall of the American comedy-drama television series Younger. Directed by Andrew Fleming and written by Darren Star and Grant Sloss, it premiered in the United States on TV Land on August 28, 2018. The episode revolves around new staff changes occurring at Empirical Press after Quinn Tyler, an author, decides to make an investment in the company and ends up learning Liza's secret and her affair with Charles. Upon its airing, the installment was watched by 0.734 million Americans and received a 0.18 percent share, according to Nielsen Media Research.

== Plot ==
Diana and Enzo have an argument after she laughs at his new job opportunity: being part of a task force to take down a fatberg. During the operation, Enzo and other workers go missing and Diana rushes to the local hoping for him to be saved. He is then removed from the sewers, covered in dirt, and Diana embraces him, regardless of the dirt. Josh starts considering the possibility of being Malkie and Maggie's sperm donator. In an ayahuasca-like ceremony organized by Lauren, he sleeps and dreams about being a parent alongside Liza, thus leading him to turn down the request. Clare later shows up at his door, pregnant with his child.

Through Cheryl, Liza is introduced to Chicky, an imprint created exclusively for her to manage, with a focus on the young female audience, but not excluding men. Although impressed by having her own office and the high salary, Liza asks to return later with the signed contract. Jake Devereux is hosting a party in Washington, D.C., one that Kelsey wasn't aware, and Charles tells her that Jake specifically affirmed that she could not be there. He then reveals that Jake once asked to move his book from Millennial to Empirical and thus remove Kelsey's name from it, but Zane refused to, leading her to think that she has misjudged Zane. She talks to him about it and he confesses that he was in love with her back then and that their competition is over. She later discovers that Zane has quit his job, but she quickly learns that he has gotten another job already, to which he replies by smiling.

Quinn tells Charles that she is concocting a plan to invest in Empirical and help the company's financial situation, inspired by her own experience and her love for the publishing business. Her strategy is to turn Millennial the flagship brand of the publishing house, instead of Empirical. Once learning about it, Kelsey reaffirms that Liza can't leave, to which she responds that her secret could potentially damage even more the company. She remains decided to leave, have her own career without secrets and date Charles whereas Kelsey runs Millennial by herself. After learning the truth about Liza's age, Quinn gets further willing to invest, noticing that Liza is the embodiment of her Claw book.

Liza ultimately refuses Cheryl's offer, leaving the woman infuriated. Afterwards, Quinn meets with Charles and reveals the existence of an article about his affair with Liza, as his 27-years-old assistant. She then affirms that the source is Cheryl, who hasn't revealed Liza's secret, but the affair, which Quinn did not know about. With that liability, Quinn decides to drop her offer since Charles is the company's public face, but he quickly thinks of a new plan. The two reunite the company's staff to announce that Kelsey is the new publisher, replacing Charles, while he becomes chairman of the board, a title that removes him from the daily toil. Stunned by the recent changes, Liza follows Charles into Bryant Park, where they chat about him being more available now to build a proper relationship with her as he watches her career thrive. He affirms he's happy, they kiss, hold hands and start walking. Gradually, their smiling faces turn into discomfort.

== Production ==
"Lizability" was directed by Andrew Fleming and written by Darren Star and Grant Sloss. The entire ensemble cast appear in the episode alongside Laura Benanti, Phoebe Dynevor, Martha Plimpton, and Chris Tardio, who played Quinn Tyler, Clare, Cheryl Sussman, and Enzo De Luca, respectively. The score is composed by Chris Alan Lee. The episode features the songs "Kill of the Night" by Gin Wigmore, "Travel With Me" by Misun, and "Fallingwater" by Maggie Rogers.

== Reception ==
=== Ratings ===
"Lizability" premiered on TV Land on August 28, 2018, in the United States, where the episode received a 0.18 percent share among adults between the ages of 18 and 49, meaning that it was seen by 0.18 percent of all households. It was watched by 0.734 million Americans.

=== Critical response ===
In a positive review of the fifth season, Vulture's Jen Chaney praised the series' approach on ageism and middle age, commenting, "Younger obviously has no qualms about stretching the bounds of believability to suit its narrative, but the season’s ending is one of those times when the show actually opts to be realistic. It feels absolutely right for Younger to go on hiatus on this downbeat note. After five seasons, this show about the ramifications of one woman’s lie is willing to reveal what it looks like when grown adults lie to themselves." Giving the episode a 5/5 stars rating, Samantha Coley from Tell-Tale TV praised Josh and Maggie's friendship and glorified the presence of women in the main plot, affirming, "Younger has done a great job of keeping strong, intelligent women at its core, and having them take control of the company is a great move."

In a mixed review, Irvin K of website Hypable, criticized the season's focus on romance, leaving other important story lines aside, such as Maggie and Liza's long-time friendship and the company's economy issues. He wrote, "Romance was always a part of Liza’s journey – Team Charles or Team Josh? But that was, at best, one overarching plot of many, interspersed with scenes of Liza commiserating with Maggie about kids these days, or supporting Kelsey through the quagmire of the publishing industry, or navigating the weirder and weirder demands of being Diana’s assistant." Upon the season finale's airing, Nico Tortorella was mentioned in TVLine's "Performers of the Week" article, with the writers commenting, "Tortorella’s innate ability to pivot from optimistic to devastated, as effortlessly as one would flip a light switch, is truly a gift."
