= Dharma & Greg =

American television sitcom (1997–2002)

- Genre: Sitcom
- Created by: Dottie Dartland; Chuck Lorre
- Starring: Jenna Elfman; Thomas Gibson; Joel Murray; Mimi Kennedy; Alan Rachins; Mitchell Ryan; Susan Sullivan; Shae D'lyn; Susan Chuang; Helen Greenberg
- Opening theme: "Dharma & Greg" by Dennis C. Brown
- Ending theme: "Dharma & Greg" (some episodes)
- Composer: Dennis C. Brown
- Country of origin: United States
- Original language: English
- No. of seasons: 5
- No. of episodes: 119 (list of episodes)

Production
- Executive producers: Chuck Lorre; Brian Medavoy; Erwin More (all; entire run); Dottie Dartland (1997–1999); Regina Stewart (1999–2000); Bill Prady (1999–2002)
- Producer: Jenna Elfman
- Camera setup: Multi-camera
- Running time: approx. 22 minutes
- Production companies: Chuck Lorre Productions; More-Medavoy Productions; 4 to 6 Foot Productions (seasons 1–2 only) (1997–1999); 20th Century Fox Television

Original release
- Network: ABC
- Release: September 24, 1997 – April 30, 2002

Dharma & Greg is an American television sitcom that originally aired on ABC for five seasons from September 24, 1997, to April 30, 2002, with a total of 119 episodes.

The show starred Jenna Elfman and Thomas Gibson as Dharma and Greg Montgomery, a couple who married on their first date despite being polar opposites. The series was co-produced by Chuck Lorre Productions, More-Medavoy Productions and 4 to 6 Foot Productions (seasons 1–2 only) in association with 20th Century Fox Television and syndicated by 20th Television. The show's theme song was written and performed by composer Dennis C. Brown.

Created by executive producers Dottie Dartland and Chuck Lorre, the comedy took much of its inspiration from culture-clash fish out of water situations. The show earned eight Golden Globe nominations, six Emmy Award nominations, and six Satellite Award nominations. Elfman earned a Golden Globe in 1999 for Best Actress.

== Show summary ==
Free-spirited yoga instructor/dog trainer Dharma Finkelstein and straight-laced lawyer Greg Montgomery marry on their first date despite being complete opposites. Their conflicting views lead to comical situations. Greg is an Ivy League graduate who was raised by wealthy, conservative White Anglo-Saxon Protestant parents. After graduation from Harvard and Stanford, he went to work with the US Attorney's Office as a federal prosecutor in San Francisco. He then meets Dharma, a woman who was raised by hippie Jewish parents. They fall in love immediately and elope. Despite being totally different, their parents eventually learn to tolerate each other.

== Cast ==
=== Main ===
- Jenna Elfman as Dharma Freedom Montgomery
- Thomas Gibson as Gregory Clifford "Greg" Montgomery
- Susan Sullivan as Katherine "Kitty" Montgomery
- Mitchell Ryan as Edward Montgomery
- Mimi Kennedy as Abigail Kathleen "Abby" O'Neil
- Alan Rachins as Myron Lawrence "Larry" Finkelstein
- Shae D'lyn as Jane Deaux (seasons 1–4; guest season 5)
- Joel Murray as Peter James "Pete" Cavanaugh
- Helen Greenberg as Marcie (season 5; guest seasons 3–4)
- Susan Chuang as Susan Wong (season 5; guest seasons 3–4)

=== Recurring ===
- Lillian Hurst as Celia
- Yeardley Smith as Marlene
- Floyd Westerman as George Littlefox
- Kathryn Joosten as Claire
- J. D. Walsh as Donald
- Kevin Sorbo as Charlie

== Episodes ==
Season	Episodes	Originally released	
Season	Episodes	First released	Last released
1	23	September 24, 1997	May 20, 1998
2	24	September 23, 1998	May 26, 1999
3	24	September 21, 1999	May 16, 2000
4	24	October 10, 2000	May 22, 2001
5	24	September 25, 2001	April 30, 2002

== Awards and nominations ==
In 1998, the Online Film & Television Association Awards nominated Elfman for Best Actress in a Comedy Series and the series itself as Best New Comedy Series.

Jenna Elfman was nominated three times for Best Television Actress – Musical/Comedy Series at the Golden Globes and won in 1999. Thomas Gibson and Susan Sullivan were both nominated for Golden Globes, but neither ever won the award. The show itself was nominated for Best Best Musical/Comedy Series in 1998 and 1999.

== Broadcast ==
Dharma & Greg aired in the United States on ABC from September 24, 1997 until April 30, 2002 and in Australia on the Seven Network between March 1, 1998 and February 4, 2004. In Australia, Dharma & Greg aired on Fox8 from 1998 to 2004 on Foxtel.

== Ratings and cancellation ==
The series was a top-25 fixture in the US during its first three seasons, first airing Wednesday at 8:30 p.m., then at 8:00. It was moved to Tuesdays at 9 p.m. during its third season where it experienced a dramatic ratings lift thanks to a lead-in of the then red-hot Who Wants to Be a Millionaire. As ratings for that series waned in 2000/2001, Dharma & Greg suffered a similar fate, compounded by NBC moving Frasier into the same time slot. As Millionaire fell even further and was moved off the night in the fall of 2001, ABC tried to rebuild a Tuesday night comedy block consisting of Dharma & Greg, What About Joan?, Bob Patterson, and Spin City. Bob Patterson and What About Joan? were quickly cancelled in May 2002 while Dharma & Greg and Spin City shared the 8 p.m. hour for the rest of the season.

The final episode aired on April 30, 2002, to 6.8 million viewers, compared to the 20 million the series had peaked at two years previously. Along with Ally McBeal and Dawson's Creek, Dharma & Greg was one of the last three surviving shows to debut during the 1997–98 season (Dawson's Creek would remain for one more season in 2002–03).

Ratings for Dharma & Greg
Season	Season Premiere	Season Finale	TV Season	Ranking	Viewers (in millions)
1st	September 24, 1997	May 20, 1998	1997–1998	#25	13.9
2nd	September 23, 1998	May 26, 1999	1998–1999	#25	13.5
3rd	September 21, 1999	May 16, 2000	1999–2000	#19	10.4
4th	October 10, 2000	May 22, 2001	2000–2001	#38	12.3
5th	September 25, 2001	April 30, 2002	2001–2002	#82	8.1

== Home media ==
Season 2 was released in Australia as a Region 4 PAL on January 22, 2008, with a picture of Dharma and Greg dancing on the cover. It is available in Japan as a Region 2 NTSC format with a picture of them sitting down for the cover art. In the spring of 2008, the second season was released in Europe (Netherlands) as a Region 2 PAL as well. All countries have different covers, and all are using the "dance shot".

On November 11, 2014, 20th Century Fox released season 2 in Region 1 via Amazon.com's CreateSpace program. This is a Manufacture-on-Demand (MOD) release, available exclusively through Amazon.com.

Overview
Season	Release date			
Season	Region 1	Region 2 (UK)	Region 2 (Germany)	Region 4
Season 1	June 13, 2006	May 7, 2007	October 1, 2007	January 10, 2007
Season 2	November 11, 2014	TBA	February 11, 2008	January 23, 2008

== Vanity cards ==
The vanity card for Chuck Lorre Productions at the end of each episode included a message written by producer and show co-creator Chuck Lorre, expressing his personal views on a variety of subjects. Because the card only appeared on the screen for a brief moment, it was usually readable only by those who recorded the program and paused it (although the complete collection of cards has now been posted on Lorre's website).

Messages were also included on the vanity cards for later Chuck Lorre Productions shows, such as Two and a Half Men, The Big Bang Theory, and Mike & Molly.

== Crossovers ==
Elfman and Gibson had a cameo appearance in the ninth season premiere of Two and a Half Men, "Nice to Meet You, Walden Schmidt". Their characters are not named either in the dialogue or the credits (possibly for legal reasons due to Men's being produced by a different studio), but they appear to be based on Dharma and Greg. While the couple remain married, Greg seems overly tired of his responsibilities and marriage, even going so far as to sarcastically hint at divorce to Evelyn Harper (along with a self-inflicted gunshot gesture) when leaving. Joel Murray also makes a cameo appearance in the episode, although not as Pete but as a character named "Doug". Elfman had also previously appeared on that show in its first season as the free-spirited Frankie in the two-part episodes "Round One to the Hot Crazy Chick" and "That Was Saliva, Alan."
