= Eric Zicklin =

American television producer and writer (born 1967)

- Born: 1967 (age 58–59); New Jersey, U.S.
- Occupations: Television producer, television writer
- Years active: 1994–present
- Spouse: Dottie Zicklin

Eric Zicklin is an American television producer and writer.

He is best known for his work on all 7 seasons of the Darren Star romcom Younger as well as the sitcoms Frasier and Dharma & Greg. His other television credits include Stark Raving Mad, Center of the Universe, Twenty Good Years, Yes, Dear and Hot in Cleveland.

In 1995, in one of his first television jobs as a writer he won a Primetime Emmy Award for the Michael Moore series TV Nation, as a part of the writing team. In 2001, he was nominated for another Emmy for his work on Frasier.

He is married to fellow television producer/writer Dottie Dartland Zicklin.
