= Dottie Zicklin =

American television writer and producer (born 1964)

Dottie Dartland Zicklin (born in Florida in 1964) is an American television writer and producer.

Zicklin graduated from the Massachusetts Institute of Technology in 1986. She is the co-creator of the sitcoms Caroline in the City, Dharma & Greg, and Are You There, Chelsea?, and has written and produced other series, including Grace Under Fire and Cybill. Her production company is called 4 to 6 Foot Productions, a reference to surfing, one of her passions.

== Awards ==
She was twice nominated for WGA Awards from the Writers Guild of America.

- 1999 - Nominated, WGA Award (TV) for Episodic Comedy, for Dharma & Greg episode "Pilot." Shared with Chuck Lorre.
- 1991 - Nominated, WGA Award (TV) for Episodic Drama, for China Beach episode "Warriors." Shared with Martin M. Goldstein and Neal Baer.

== Personal ==
Zicklin is married to fellow television producer/writer Eric Zicklin.
